= Christijan Albers =

Dutch racing driver (born 1979)

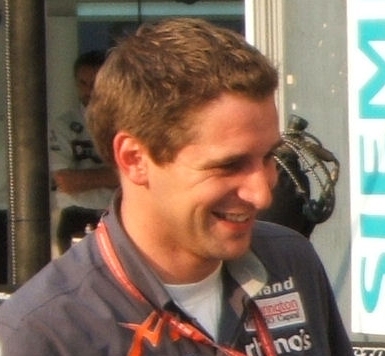
- Albers at the 2006 United States Grand Prix
- Born: 16 April 1979 (age 47); Eindhoven, North Brabant, Netherlands

Formula One World Championship career
- Nationality: (Netherlands) Dutch
- Active years: 2005–2007
- Team(s): Minardi, Midland, Spyker
- Entries: 46
- Championships: 0
- Wins: 0
- Podiums: 0
- Career points: 4
- Pole positions: 0
- Fastest laps: 0
- First entry: 2005 Australian Grand Prix
- Last entry: 2007 British Grand Prix

Christijan Albers

Le Mans Series career
- Debut season: 2009
- Current team: ByKolles
- Starts: 5
- Wins: 0
- Poles: 0
- Fastest laps: 0

Previous series
- 2008 2005–07 2001–04, 2008 2001–02, 2004 2000 1999 1998–99 1998–99 1997: American Le Mans Series; Formula One; DTM; Formula One testing International Formula 3000; Belcar; British F3; German F3; Formula Ford 1800 Benelux

Championship titles
- 1999 1997: German F3; Formula Ford 1800 Benelux

24 Hours of Le Mans career
- Years: 2009–2010
- Teams: ByKolles
- Best finish: 9th (2009)
- Class wins: 0

Christijan Albers (Christijan Albers) (born 16 April 1979) is a Dutch former professional racing driver. After success in the DTM he drove in Formula One from 2005 until the 2007 British Grand Prix, shortly after which he was dropped by the Spyker F1 team. In 2008, he returned to the DTM series as a driver for the Audi Futurecom TME team. Albers acted as Team Principal and CEO of the Caterham F1 Team from July to September 2014 after it was acquired by new team owners. His estimated net-worth is $80 million.

== Personal ==
Albers was born in Eindhoven, the son of former rallycross ace and Porsche 911 Carrera campaigner André Albers, who won the 1979 Dutch International Rallycross Championship (GT Division). They are not related to their compatriot Marcel Albers, who was killed in a British Formula Three accident at Thruxton in 1992.

Albers is married to Liselore Kooijman. Their wedding took place on 11 November 2006 in Amsterdam. He resides in Monaco.

== Early career ==
Albers began kart racing at a young age, winning the Dutch National championship in 1997. That same year, he was crowned Formula Ford 1800 champion in both Netherlands and Belgium. He also participated in the Renault Megane Marlboro Masters series. In 1998, he moved up to the German Formula Three series, winning the championship in 1999 with six wins and ten poles.

In 2000, Albers raced in the International Formula 3000 championship as team-mate to Mark Webber. He failed to score a point, but team boss Paul Stoddart later signed him again. He also raced in European Formula Racing.

== DTM ==
Beginning in 2001, Albers raced in the Deutsche Tourenwagen Masters for Mercedes-Benz, and graduated from a privately run team to the works AMG outfit in 2003 after the departure from the series of Uwe Alzen. He was instantly a front-runner, finishing runner-up in 2003 with a season-high four wins, and challenging DTM veteran and multiple champion Bernd Schneider for the title all the way up to the final race. In 2004, he again challenged for the championship lead for most of the season but eventually finished third.

== Formula One ==
=== Minardi (2005) ===
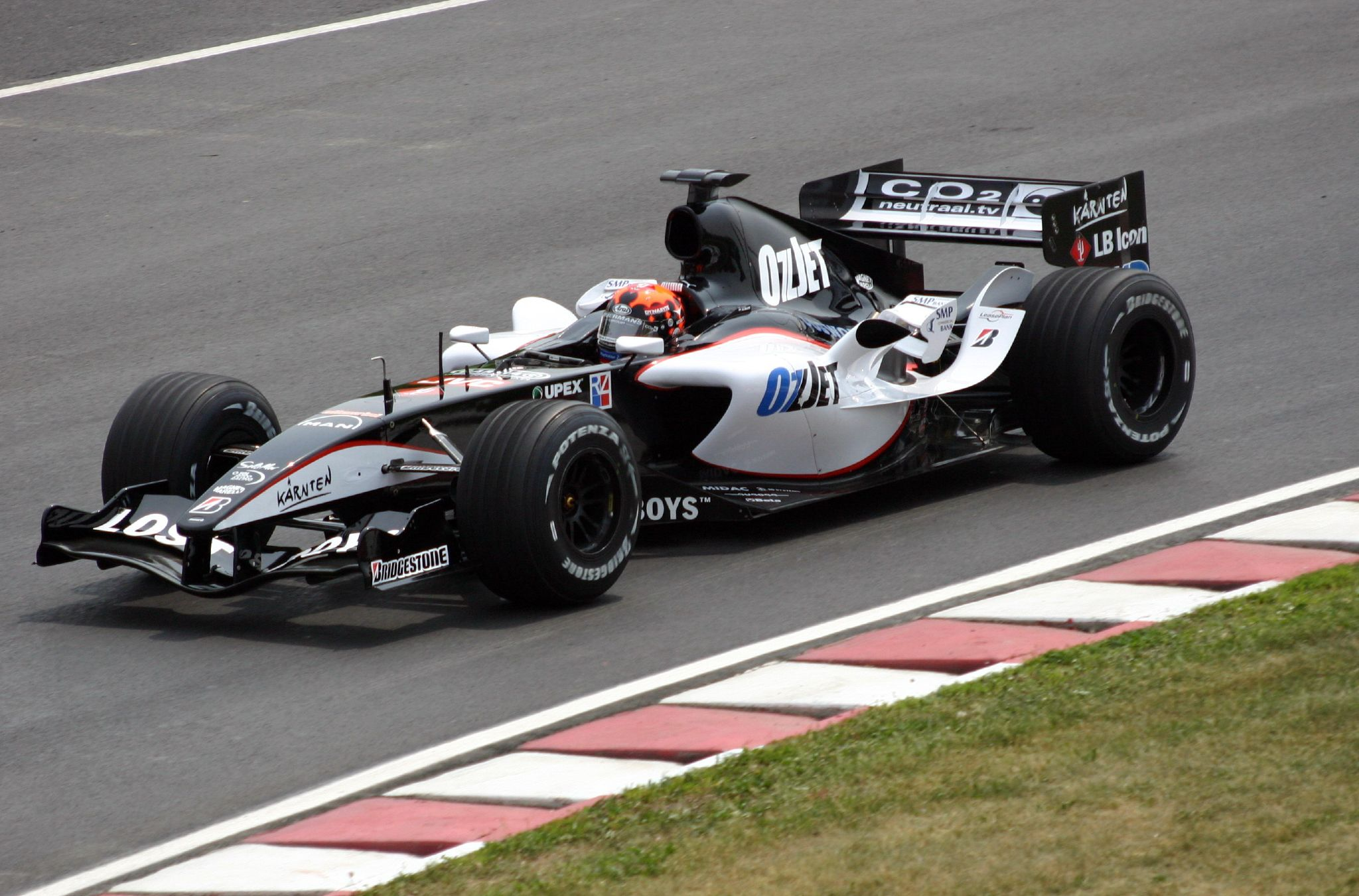
Albers driving for Minardi at the 2005 Canadian Grand Prix.

While racing in the DTM, Albers continued to be a test and reserve driver for Minardi's Formula One interests, and also drove the team's two-seater Formula One cars. In November 2004, he set the fastest time at a Misano di Gera d'Adda Minardi test session. He was chosen by the team to drive in the Formula One World Championship in 2005. At the 2005 United States Grand Prix, he gained his first championship points with a fifth-place finish, a race where only six drivers started.

=== Midland/Spyker F1 (2006–2007) ===
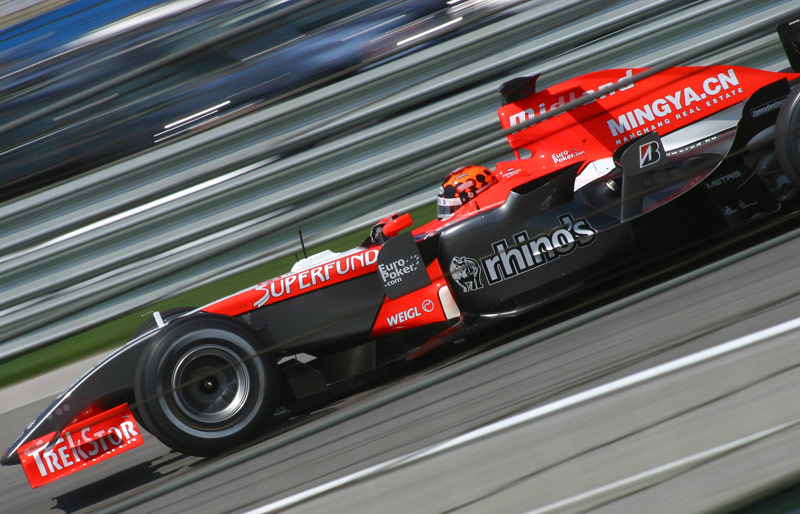
Albers driving the Midland M16 during the 2006 United States Grand Prix.

On 31 October 2005, Albers was confirmed as Midland's first official Formula One driver. Midland, the renamed Jordan team, made their debut in the 2006 Formula One season.

Albers started the 2006 season well, out-pacing Midland teammate Tiago Monteiro. However, during the first few races, Midland found themselves battling with the Super Aguri team, particularly Takuma Sato. At the 2006 San Marino Grand Prix, Albers found himself being crashed into by Yuji Ide and sent into a series of spectacular rolls. Incredibly he was unharmed. Ide was reprimanded by the race stewards. Ide also had his Super Licence revoked for severe dangerous driving.

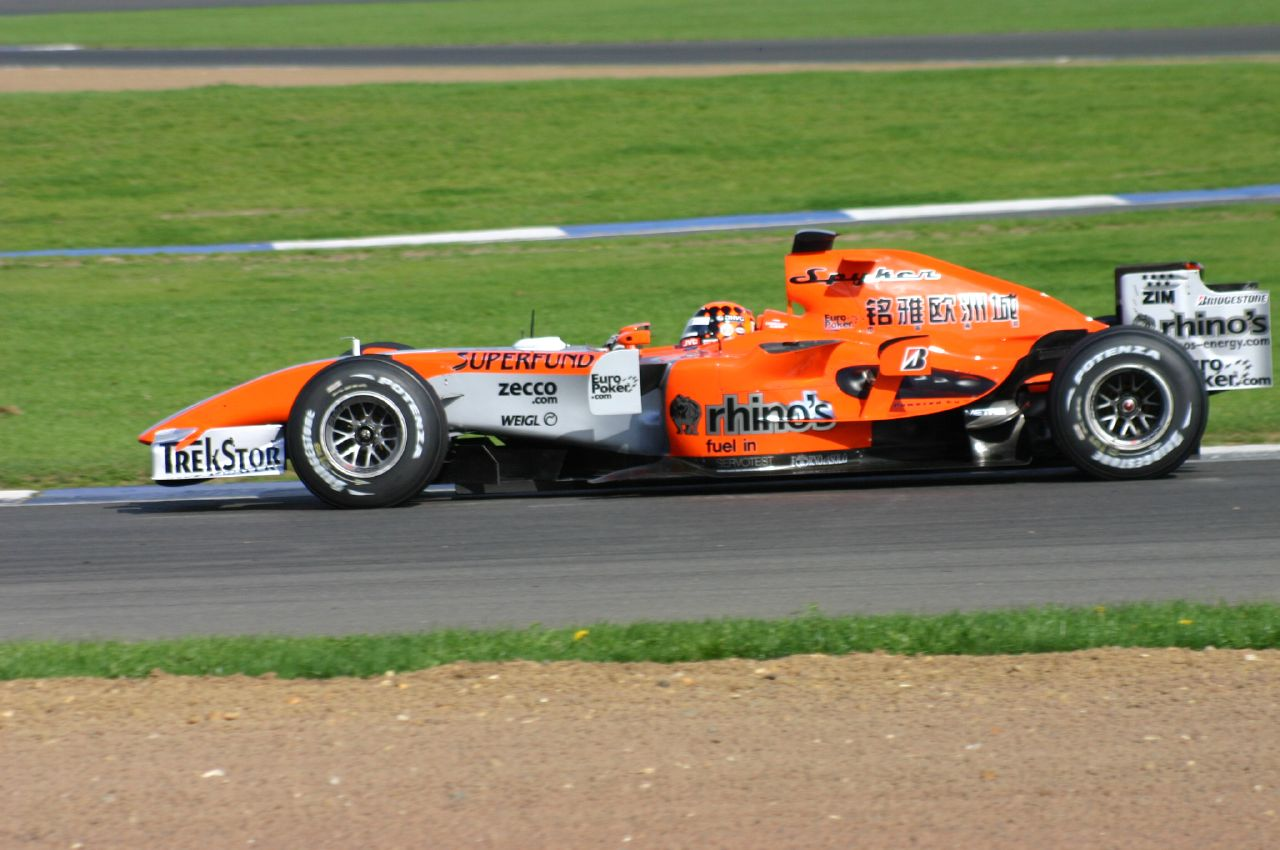
Albers driving at Silverstone after Spyker's purchase of the team.

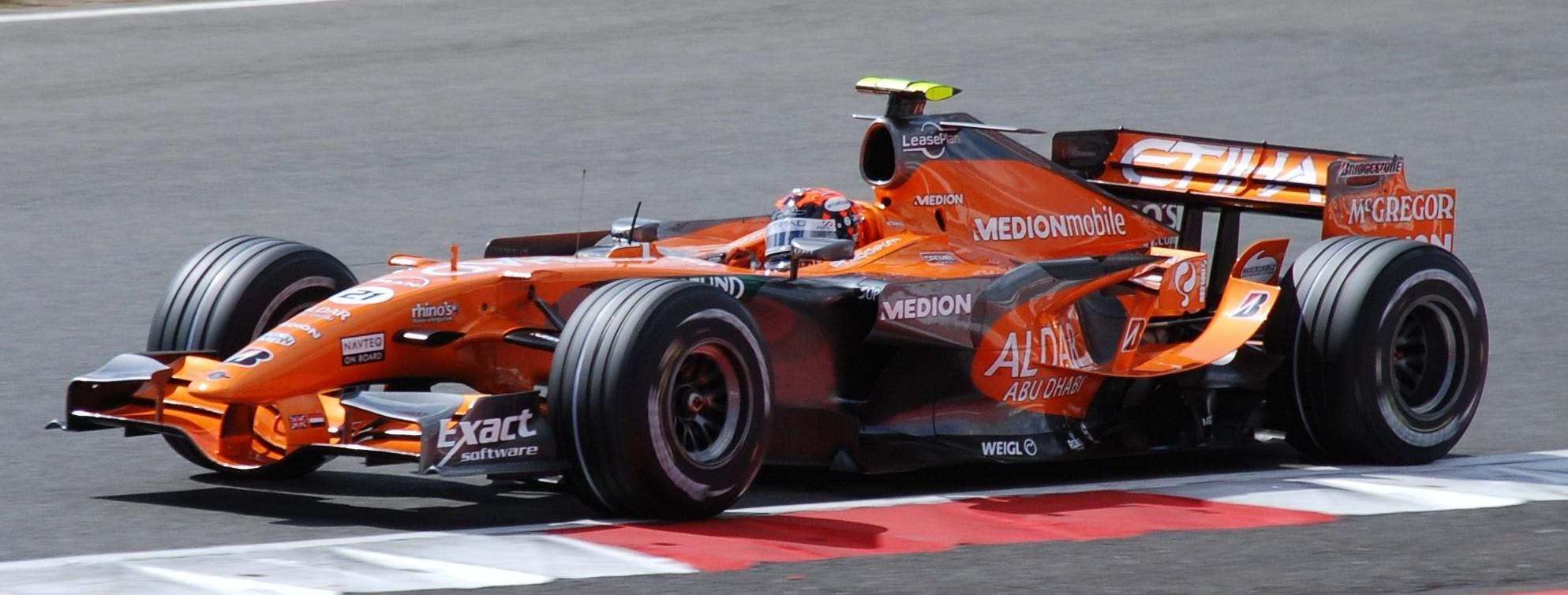
Albers driving for Spyker F1 at the 2007 British Grand Prix.

After initial confusion over Albers's plans for 2007 after the takeover of MF1 by Spyker Cars, it was eventually confirmed that he would be driving for the Spyker F1 team in 2007.

It was later found out that Albers signed a contract with Midland F1 to remain with the team prior to the sale to Spyker. Albers's personal sponsors had major influences in Spyker buying the Midland F1 team.

In early 2007, Albers was outperformed by rookie team-mate Adrian Sutil. At Magny-Cours he ignored the lollipop telling him not to leave the pits during a pitstop, driving off with part of the fuel rig still attached. Albers expressed relief that nobody was hurt, but he received a €5,000 penalty for dangerous driving. Spyker technical director Mike Gascoyne commented that he was mystified by the mistake.

On 10 July 2007, Albers was released from his Spyker contract, due to a lack of sponsorship money, which would have compromised the team's development programme. Team owner Michiel Mol described it as "one of the toughest decisions of my career". His replacement for the 2007 European Grand Prix was former Spyker test driver Markus Winkelhock. Sakon Yamamoto then raced for Spyker for the rest of the year.

Albers returned with the Spyker team for the Rotterdam street racing event in the Netherlands, on the 18 / 19 August.

=== Team principal at Caterham F1 (2014) ===
On 2 July 2014, Tony Fernandes sold the Caterham F1 Team to a consortium of Swiss-Middle Eastern investors. Subsequently, team principal Cyril Abiteboul stepped down and Albers was given his position in the team by the consortium. He ran the team on a day-to-day basis until Caterham collapsed following the 2014 Abu Dhabi Grand Prix.

== Return to DTM ==
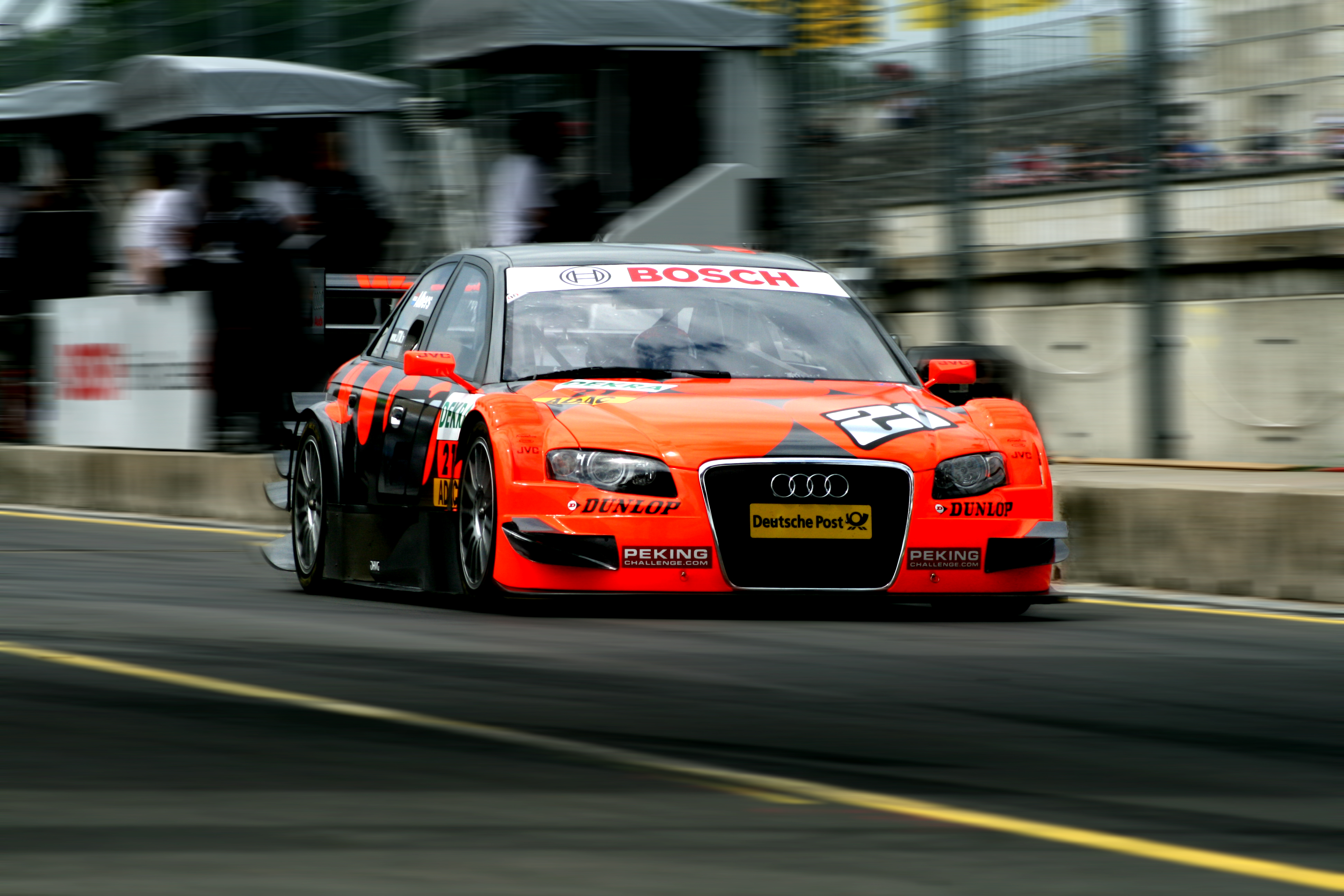
Albers driving an Audi at Norisring in 2008.

Albers returned to the DTM-series in December 2007 as the Dutchman was invited by the Audi-team of Futurecom TME for a week of testing in Jerez de la Frontera. He tested for this team again on the Mugello Circuit in early March.

Albers was confirmed as a race driver for the Futurecom TME race team for 2008. He raced alongside Katherine Legge in a 2006 Specification Audi A4 DTM.

Albers is the Netherlands's most successful driver in the DTM series, finishing as runner-up in the 2003 championship.

== Sportscar racing ==
It was announced on 9 October 2008 that Albers would be racing with Audi Sport North America in the American Le Mans Series. He piloted the No. 1 R10 TDI, partnered with Emanuele Pirro at Laguna Seca, the ALMS final round. This was another step by Audi to bring youth to their Le Mans programs, following Marcel Fässler's two races in the R10. He finished this race in second place behind the #2 car from the same team.

Albers moved into the Le Mans Series for the 2009 season, moving to the customer Audi team, run by Colin Kolles.

== Helmet design ==
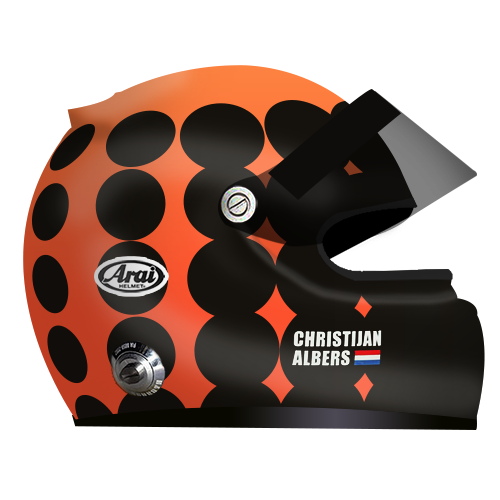
Albers' helmet design

Albers' helmet design consists of an orange helmet with multiple black dots over it. He later changed it to the same design, but with inverted colors.

== TV analyst ==
Albers joined Dutch sports broadcaster Viaplay in 2022 as part of a team of Formula One analysts.

== Racing record ==
=== Career summary ===
Season	Series	Team	Races	Poles	Wins	Points	Position
1997	Formula Ford 1800 Benelux	?	?	?	?	?	**1st**
1998	German Formula Three	Van Amersfoort Racing	20	1	2	120	5th
1998	Macau Grand Prix	Van Amersfoort Racing	1	0	0	N/A	NC
1998	Masters of Formula Three	Van Amersfoort Racing	1	0	0	N/A	NC
1998	British Formula 3	Opel Team BSR	1	0	0	0	NC
1999	German Formula Three	Opel Team BSR	18	6	6	229	**1st**
1999	British Formula 3	Opel Team BSR	1	0	0	0	NC
1999	Macau Grand Prix	Opel Team BSR	1	0	0	N/A	NC
1999	Masters of Formula Three	Opel Team BSR	1	0	0	N/A	4th
1999	Korea Super Prix	Opel Team BSR	1	0	0	N/A	NC
2000	International Formula 3000	European Arrows	9	0	0	0	27th
2001	Deutsche Tourenwagen Masters	Persson Motorsport	20	0	0	19	14th
2002	Deutsche Tourenwagen Masters	Team Rosberg	20	0	0	5	12th
2003	Deutsche Tourenwagen Masters	HWA AMG	10	4	4	64	**2nd**
2004	Deutsche Tourenwagen Masters	HWA AMG	11	1	1	50	**3rd**
2004	Formula One	Minardi F1 Team	Test driver				
2005	Formula One	Minardi F1 Team	19	0	0	4	19th
2006	Formula One	MF1 Racing; Spyker MF1 Racing	18	0	0	0	22nd
2007	Formula One	Etihad Aldar Spyker F1 Team	9	0	0	0	25th
2008	Deutsche Tourenwagen Masters	Futurecom TME	11	0	0	0	17th
2008	American Le Mans Series	Audi Sport North America	1	0	0	21	19th
2009	Le Mans Series	Kolles	5	0	0	6	14th
2009	Le Mans 24 Hours - LMP1	Kolles	1	0	0	N/A	9th
2010	Le Mans 24 Hours - LMP2	Kolles	1	0	0	N/A	NC
2012	FIA World Endurance Championship	Lotus	1	0	0	0.5	87th

=== Complete German Formula Three results ===
(key) (Races in bold indicate pole position) (Races in italics indicate fastest lap)

Year	Entrant	Engine	1	2	3	4	5	6	7	8	9	10	11	12	13	14	15	16	17	18	19	20	DC	Pts
1998	Van Amersfoort Racing	Opel	HOC; 1; 3	HOC; 2 Ret	NÜR; 1; 6	NÜR; 2; 10	SAC; 1; 13	SAC; 2; 10	NOR; 1; 1	**NOR**; **2**; 1	LAH; 1; 16	LAH; 2; 18	WUN; 1; 9	WUN; 2; 5	ZWE; 1; 8	ZWE; 2; 6	SAL; 1; 7	SAL; 2; 4	OSC; 1; 2	OSC; 2; 3	NÜR; 1; 3	NÜR; 2; 11	5th	120
1999	Opel Team BSR	Opel	SAC; 1 Ret	SAC; 2; 7	ZWE; 1; 7	ZWE; 2; 3	OSC; 1; 1	OSC; 2; 3	NOR; 1; 1	NOR; 2; 2	**NÜR**; **1**; 1	**NÜR**; **2**; 1	**SAL**; **1**; 1	SAL; 2; 7	**OSC**; **1**; 3	OSC; 2 EX	**HOC**; **1**; 1	**HOC**; **2**; 5	NÜR; 1; 2	NÜR; 2; 2			1st	229

=== Complete International Formula 3000 results ===
(key) (Races in bold indicate pole position) (Races in italics indicate fastest lap)

Year	Entrant	1	2	3	4	5	6	7	8	9	10	DC	Points
2000	European Arrows F3000	IMO; Ret	SIL; Ret	CAT; 12	NÜR; Ret	MON; Ret	MAG; 7	A1R; Ret	HOC; DNQ	HUN; Ret	SPA; 8	25th	0

=== Complete DTM results ===
(key)

Year	Team	Car	1	2	3	4	5	6	7	8	9	10	11	12	13	14	15	16	17	18	19	20	Pos.	Pts
2001	Persson Motorsport	AMG-Mercedes CLK-DTM	HOC; QR; 13	HOC; CR; 13	NÜR; QR; 13	NÜR; CR; 12	OSC; QR; 11	OSC; CR; 11	SAC; QR; 16	SAC; CR; 2	NOR; QR; 13	NOR; CR; 16	LAU; QR; 12	LAU; CR; 16	NÜR; QR; 8	NÜR; CR; 9	A1R; QR; 11	A1R; CR; Ret	ZAN; QR; 8	ZAN; CR; Ret	HOC; QR; 14	HOC; CR; 9	14th	19
2002	Team Rosberg	AMG-Mercedes CLK-DTM	HOC; QR; Ret	HOC; CR; Ret	ZOL; QR; 13	ZOL; CR; 6	DON; QR; 11	DON; CR; 4	SAC; QR; 13	SAC; CR; 8	NOR; QR; 10	NOR; CR; 6	LAU; QR; 20	LAU; CR; 14	NÜR; QR; 18	NÜR; CR; 17	A1R; QR; 19	A1R; CR; 13	ZAN; QR; Ret	ZAN; CR; 12	HOC; QR; 11	HOC; CR; 9	12th	5
2003	HWA Team	AMG-Mercedes CLK 2003	HOC; 5	ADR; 1	NÜR; 1	LAU; 7	NOR; 1	DON; 5	NÜR; 2	A1R; 3	ZAN; 1	HOC; 12											**2nd**	**64**
2004	HWA Team	AMG-Mercedes C-Klasse 2004	HOC; 2	EST; 1	ADR; 2	**LAU**; 2	NOR; 2	SHA; 6	NÜR; 16†	OSC; 12	ZAN; 3	BRN; Ret	HOC; 7										**3rd**	**50**
2008	Futurecom TME	Audi A4 DTM 2006	HOC; Ret	OSC; 16	MUG; 13	LAU; 14	NOR; Ret	ZAN; Ret	NÜR; 11	BRH; 14	CAT; 10	BUG; 13	HOC; Ret										17th	0
Sources:

- † — Retired, but was classified as he completed 90% of the winner's race distance.

=== Complete Formula One results ===
(key) (Races in bold indicate pole position; races in italics indicate fastest lap)

Year	Entrant	Chassis	Engine	1	2	3	4	5	6	7	8	9	10	11	12	13	14	15	16	17	18	19	WDC	Pts
2005	Minardi F1 Team	Minardi PS04B	Cosworth CR-3L 3.0 V10	AUS; Ret	MAL; 13	BHR; 13																	19th	4
2005	Minardi F1 Team	Minardi PS05	Cosworth TJ2005 3.0 V10				SMR; Ret	ESP; Ret	MON; 14	EUR; 17	CAN; 11	USA; 5	FRA; Ret	GBR; 18	GER; 13	HUN; NC	TUR; Ret	ITA; 19	BEL; 12	BRA; 14	JPN; 16	CHN; 16^{†}	19th	4
2006	Midland F1 Racing	Midland M16	Toyota RVX-06 2.4 V8	BHR; Ret	MAL; 12	AUS; 11	SMR; Ret	EUR; 13	ESP; Ret	MON; 12	GBR; 15	CAN; Ret	USA; Ret	FRA; 15	GER; DSQ	HUN; 10	TUR; Ret	ITA; 17					22nd	0
2006	Spyker MF1 Racing	Spyker M16	Toyota RVX-06 2.4 V8																CHN; 15	JPN; Ret	BRA; 14		22nd	0
2007	Etihad Aldar Spyker F1 Team	Spyker F8-VII	Ferrari 056H 2.4 V8	AUS; Ret	MAL; Ret	BHR; 14	ESP; 14	MON; 19^{†}	CAN; Ret	USA; 15	FRA; Ret	GBR; 15	EUR	HUN	TUR	ITA	BEL	JPN	CHN	BRA			25th	0

^{†} Did not finish the race, but was classified as he had completed more than 90% of the race distance.

=== Complete American Le Mans Series results ===
Year	Entrant	Class	Chassis	Engine	1	2	3	4	5	6	7	8	9	10	11	Rank	Points	Ref
2008	Audi Sport North America	LMP1	Audi R10 TDI	Audi 5.5L Turbo V12 (Diesel)	SEB	STP	LNB	UTA	LIM	MID	AME	MOS	DET	PET	MON; 2	19th	21	

=== 24 Hours of Le Mans results ===
Year	Team	Co-Drivers	Car	Class	Laps	Pos.	Class Pos.
2009	(Germany) Kolles	(Denmark) Christian Bakkerud (Switzerland) Giorgio Mondini	Audi R10 TDI	LMP1	360	9th	9th
2010	(Germany) Kolles	(Denmark) Christian Bakkerud (United Kingdom) Oliver Jarvis	Audi R10 TDI	LMP1	331	DNF	DNF

=== Complete Le Mans Series results ===
Year	Entrant	Class	Chassis	Engine	1	2	3	4	5	Rank	Points
2009	Kolles	LMP1	Audi R10 TDI	Audi TDI 5.5 L Turbo V12 (Diesel)	CAT; Ret	SPA; 7	ALG; Ret	NÜR; Ret	SIL; 5	23rd	6

=== Complete FIA World Endurance Championship results ===
Year	Entrant	Class	Chassis	Engine	1	2	3	4	5	6	7	8	Rank	Points
2012	Lotus	LMP2	Lola B12/80	Lotus (Judd) 3.6 L V8	SEB	SPA	LMS	SIL; 19	SÃO	BHR	FUJ	SHA	87th	0.5

Sporting positions
Preceded by Sebastiaan Bleekemolen	Dutch Formula Ford; Champion; 1997	Succeeded by Jeroen Bleekemolen
Preceded by Bas Leinders	German Formula Three Champion; 1999	Succeeded by Giorgio Pantano
