= 2007 British Grand Prix =

Coordinates: 52°04′43″N 1°01′01″W

Race 9 of 17 in the 2007 Formula One World Championship
← Previous race	Next race →
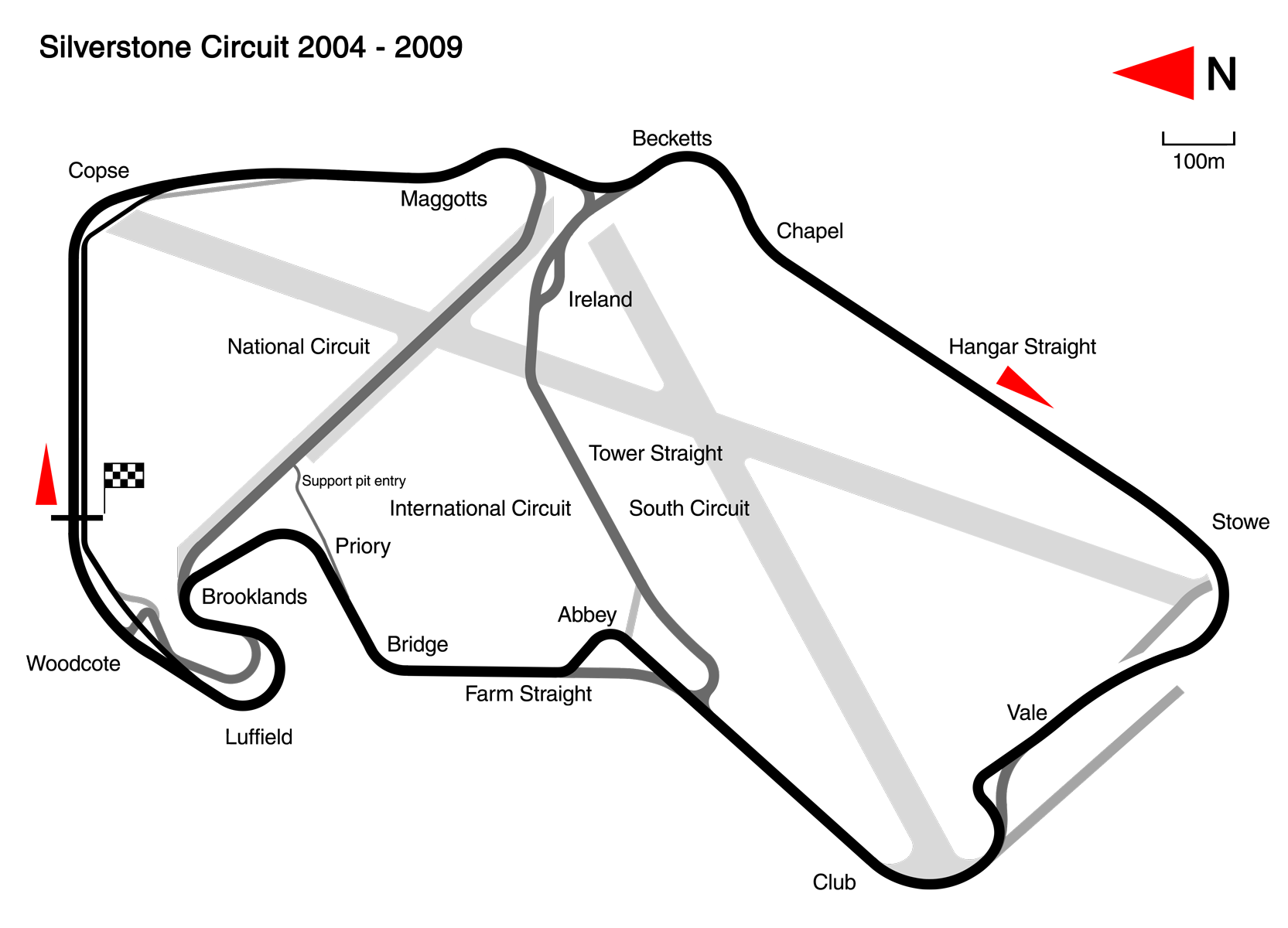
- Silverstone Circuit in 2007

Race details
- Date: 8 July 2007
- Official name: 2007 Formula 1 Santander British Grand Prix
- Location: Silverstone Circuit, Silverstone, Northamptonshire and Buckinghamshire, England
- Course: Permanent Road Facility
- Course length: 5.141 km (3.194 miles)
- Distance: 59 laps, 303.216 km (188.410 miles)
- Scheduled distance: 60 laps, 308.355 km (191.60 miles)
- Weather: Dry and sunny

Pole position
Driver	(United Kingdom) Lewis Hamilton	McLaren-Mercedes
- Time: 1:19.997

Fastest lap
Driver	(Finland) Kimi Räikkönen	Ferrari
- Time: 1:20.638 on lap 17

Podium
First	(Finland) Kimi Räikkönen	Ferrari
Second	(Spain) Fernando Alonso	McLaren-Mercedes
Third	(United Kingdom) Lewis Hamilton	McLaren-Mercedes

The 2007 British Grand Prix (formally the 2007 Formula 1 Santander British Grand Prix) was the ninth race of the 2007 FIA Formula One World Championship. It was held on 8 July 2007 at the Silverstone Circuit. The race was won by Kimi Räikkönen after overtaking pole position driver Lewis Hamilton during the first round of pit stops. Second place was taken by Fernando Alonso and Hamilton was third. With his ninth straight podium, Hamilton set the record for most consecutive podium finishes in a debut season.

Following British driver Lewis Hamilton's win at the 2007 Canadian Grand Prix, circuit director Richard Phillips reported that ticket sales had "gone through the roof". Phillips added, "we haven't seen this level of interest since Mansell-mania in the late 80s and early 90s".

== Report ==
=== Background ===
In the run up to the race Ferrari presented a legal case against English engineer Nigel Stepney and a McLaren employee, after a search warrant revealed evidence of theft of technical information from the Italian team. McLaren indicated that they would fully cooperate with the investigation, and after a thorough internal investigation the team concluded that "no Ferrari intellectual property has been passed to any other members of the team or incorporated into its cars." The FIA are launching their own investigation into the matter, but stress that their investigation will only involve matters of the Formula One rules and regulations.

In another element of the pre-race activities, the Red Bull cars of David Coulthard and Mark Webber sported a livery of fan-submitted images as part of a one-off event for the charity Wings for Life. More than 30,000 fans pledged money and uploaded images to the team's website, and each fan has selected a spot on either car to have their image placed. The goal was to raise €1 million. This would be repeated again at the 2012 British Grand Prix, but the number would be reduced to 25,000 fans.

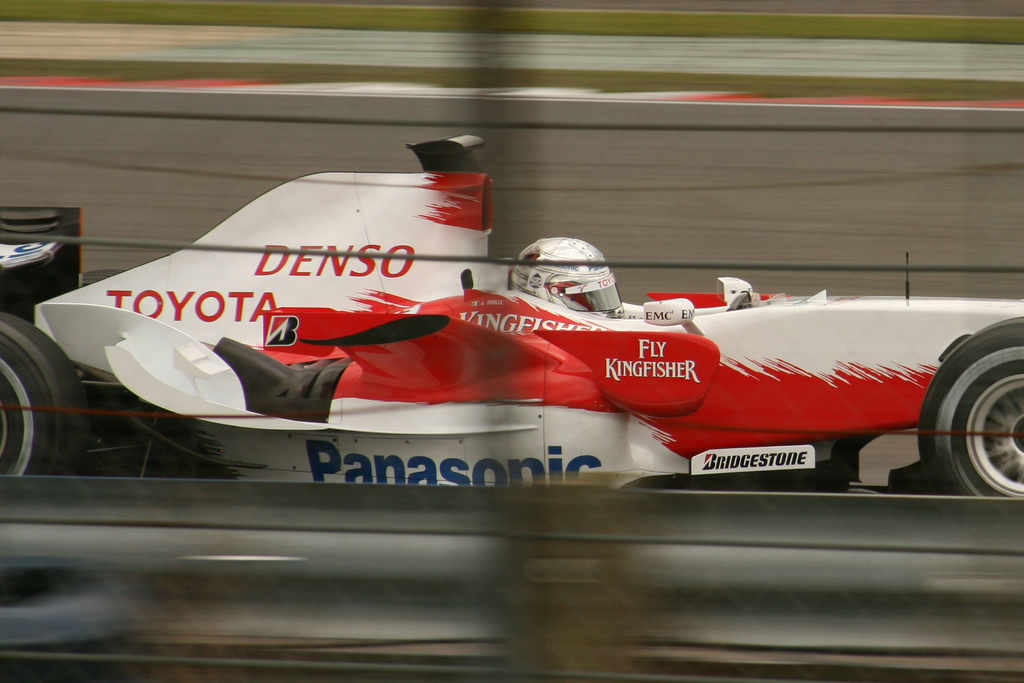
Jarno Trulli set the fastest time of the second test day in his Toyota TF107.

Preparations for the race began on 19 June, when the teams began testing at Silverstone. During the first day's testing Ralf Schumacher set the fastest time, focusing on his race setup for the Grand Prix. In contrast the two top constructors, McLaren and Ferrari, set about testing new parts and developments on their cars. This testing was undertaken by their respective test drivers, Pedro de la Rosa and Luca Badoer. Spyker brought a new chassis to the test and raced it for the first time, with Adrián Vallés and Giedo van der Garde taking the car around the track for 64 laps. Nick Heidfeld ended his test session early after complaining of back problems.

In day two of testing it was Jarno Trulli's turn to take the Toyota car around Silverstone, and managed to set the fastest time before the session was slowed down by showers. While Ferrari continued to test new parts to their car, this time with Kimi Räikkönen taking to the seat, McLaren stuck with Pedro de la Rosa and worked on the race set up and aerodynamics.

Day three saw Toyota drop down from taking the fastest times to take the fifth fastest time on a moderately damp track. Felipe Massa was the fastest man on the track after 87 laps of the British circuit testing various aerodynamic and mechanical adjustments to the car. Although delayed through an oil system problem Alonso finished off aerodynamics work and continued to set up the car for the coming British Grand Prix, finishing with a time slower than second placed Williams driver Nico Rosberg. The leading GP2 driver Timo Glock took to the circuit with BMW Sauber up against ex-rival Nelson Piquet Jr. who was driving with Renault. Piquet Jr. made the fourth fastest time, more than a second faster than Glock.

=== Practice ===
The first Friday practice was dominated as per many of the previous Grand Prix of the season, with Ferrari and McLaren taking the top 4 times. Lewis Hamilton took the top time at his home Grand Prix, and the two Ferraris split Alonso from his teammate. Both McLaren drivers spun their cars at different parts of the test, and they were not the only to do so. Other such drivers included Robert Kubica, David Coulthard, Adrian Sutil, Trulli and Massa; who all spun their vehicles on the greasy, but dry track. In the end Rosberg managed to set a faster time than the two competitive BMWs, and Trulli - who boasted a fastest time at Silverstone during testing in the last month - only just managed to set a faster time than Anthony Davidson in the Super Aguri. Davidson outpaced his British counterpart Jenson Button in the works Honda by half a second. Button, who suffered a minor back injury in a shunt in the United States Grand Prix, decided not to partake in the second Friday practice session in order to avoid aggravating the injury.

Toyota returned to previous testing form in the second session, putting their drivers in with the McLaren drivers, both of them outpacing Alonso. Schumacher even managed to run exactly the same time as Hamilton. Ferrari meanwhile got the two fastest times of the session, with Räikkönen a full half a second faster than his Brazilian team-mate. Williams were close up behind Alonso, as BMW were running lower in the field than usual. Although Kubica was not complaining, Nick Heidfeld said that "[the car] was difficult to drive, so we have to figure out why." Christian Klien got a drive during the practice to replace Button in the car and help set it up. Both of the works Hondas were beaten by both of the Super Aguri cars and Davidson improved on his time and position to tenth. Drivers from many different teams were running off the Copse corner, with eight drivers running off eleven times. The only incident of the afternoon was at the Copse, where Adrian Sutil ran his car onto the tarmac, then spun into the tyre barrier. He was unharmed and the damage to the car was insignificant.

On the Saturday practice before the qualifying, the top drivers broke the 1 minute 20 barrier, with Massa, Alonso and Räikkönen all setting fastest laps in the high 1 minute 19s. Räikkönen took the fastest time, faster than rival Alonso who had set a very similar time to Massa. Hamilton's final time on low fuel was disrupted by Alexander Wurz sending his Williams off the track, resulting in a yellow flag. Toyota and Williams were the closest to the top of the pack - as BMW continued their bad run. Nick Heidfeld improved from his bad run from the day before to take a joint eighth fastest time, but team-mate Kubica found himself only able to achieve a sixteenth fastest time. Davidson out paced his team-mate for the third time of the weekend, and he achieved a tenth fastest time - something he has never converted to a qualifying session.

=== Qualifying ===
The first qualifying session was disrupted near the end by Anthony Davidson, who spun his Super Aguri while attempting to warm the tyres, bringing out the yellow flags. This also meant that he could not complete a good hot lap and left him near the back of the grid. This also forced Sato and Button to slow down on their hot laps, and the three drivers could not improve on their previous times in the closing stages of the session. The six drivers eliminated in the first round were Albers, Sato, Sutil, Davidson, Button and Rosberg (for the first time this season, but due to an engine issue). The fastest time of the session was taking by Alonso.

The second session was quite uneventful, with Alonso taking the fastest time again. Near the end of the session the six fastest drivers decided not to set any more times. This was a gamble for the two BMW drivers, as by the end of the session Heidfeld had been pushed down to tenth position. The six drivers who were eliminated from the final session were Liuzzi, Speed, Barrichello, Wurz, Coulthard and Webber.

The two McLaren drivers were the first two drivers out on the track for the initial fuel burning phase, and initially, Alonso was the fastest on the track. After the first set of pit stops it looked like Alonso was going to take the pole. On the last set of laps, Alonso was on a faster time than he was before, but Räikkönen was on a faster. Both of them completed their laps and Räikkönen came out on top, despite an error coming out of the final corner. Hamilton who had been sitting in fourth did not look like he was very competitive during qualifying. In the last few seconds of the session he set the fastest lap and put himself on pole position, and he was the only one to break into the 1 minute 19 second margin.

=== Race ===
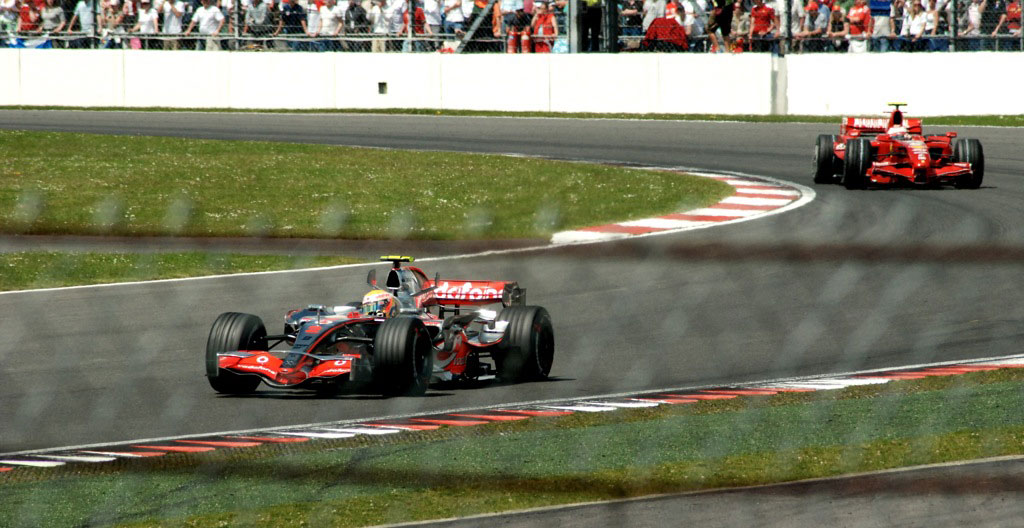
Hamilton leads the early stages of the Grand Prix, ahead of winner Kimi Räikkönen.

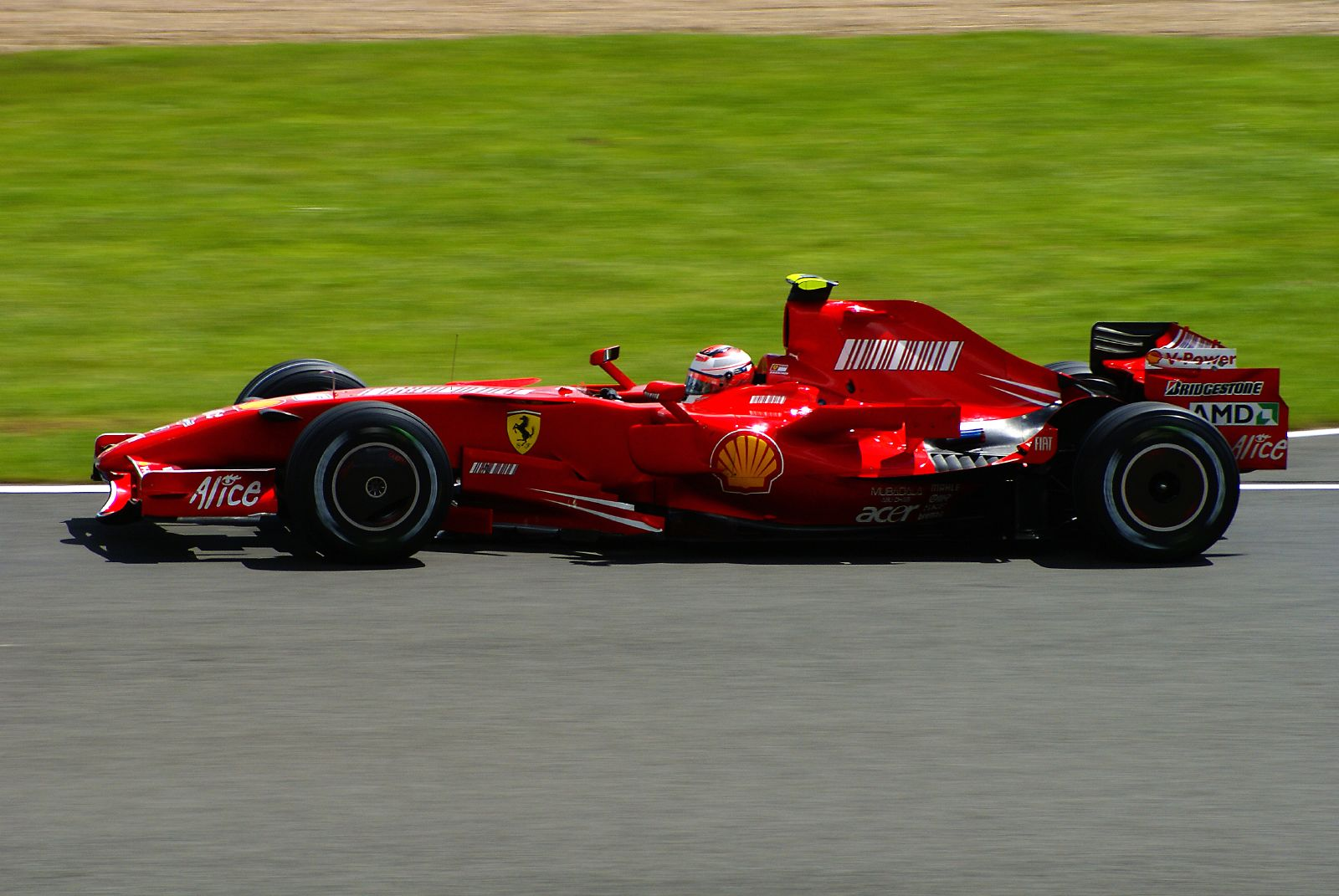
Räikkönen got past Hamilton at the first round of pit stops and Alonso during the second to take his third win of the season.

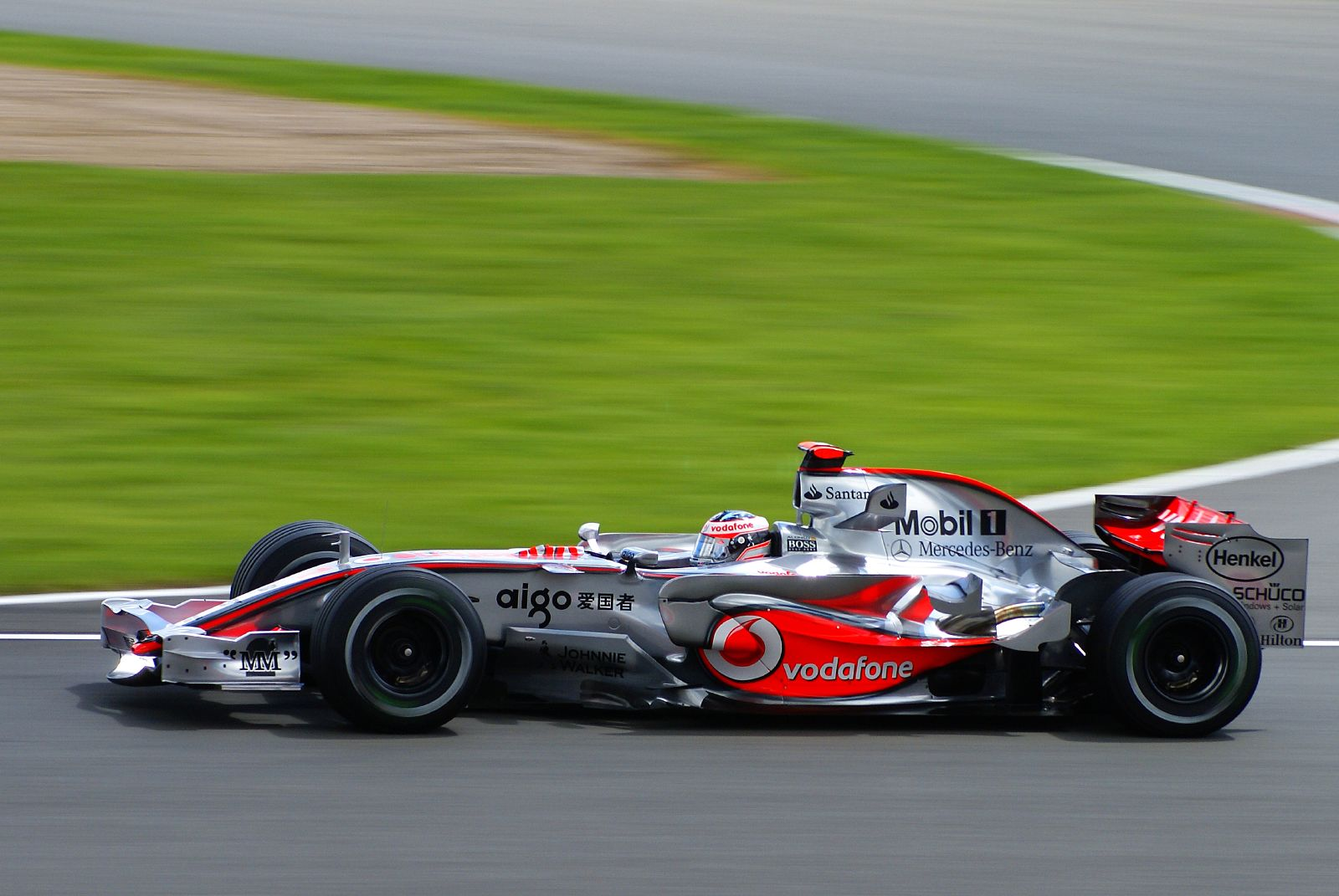
Alonso led the race during his middle stint, but had to settle for second place.

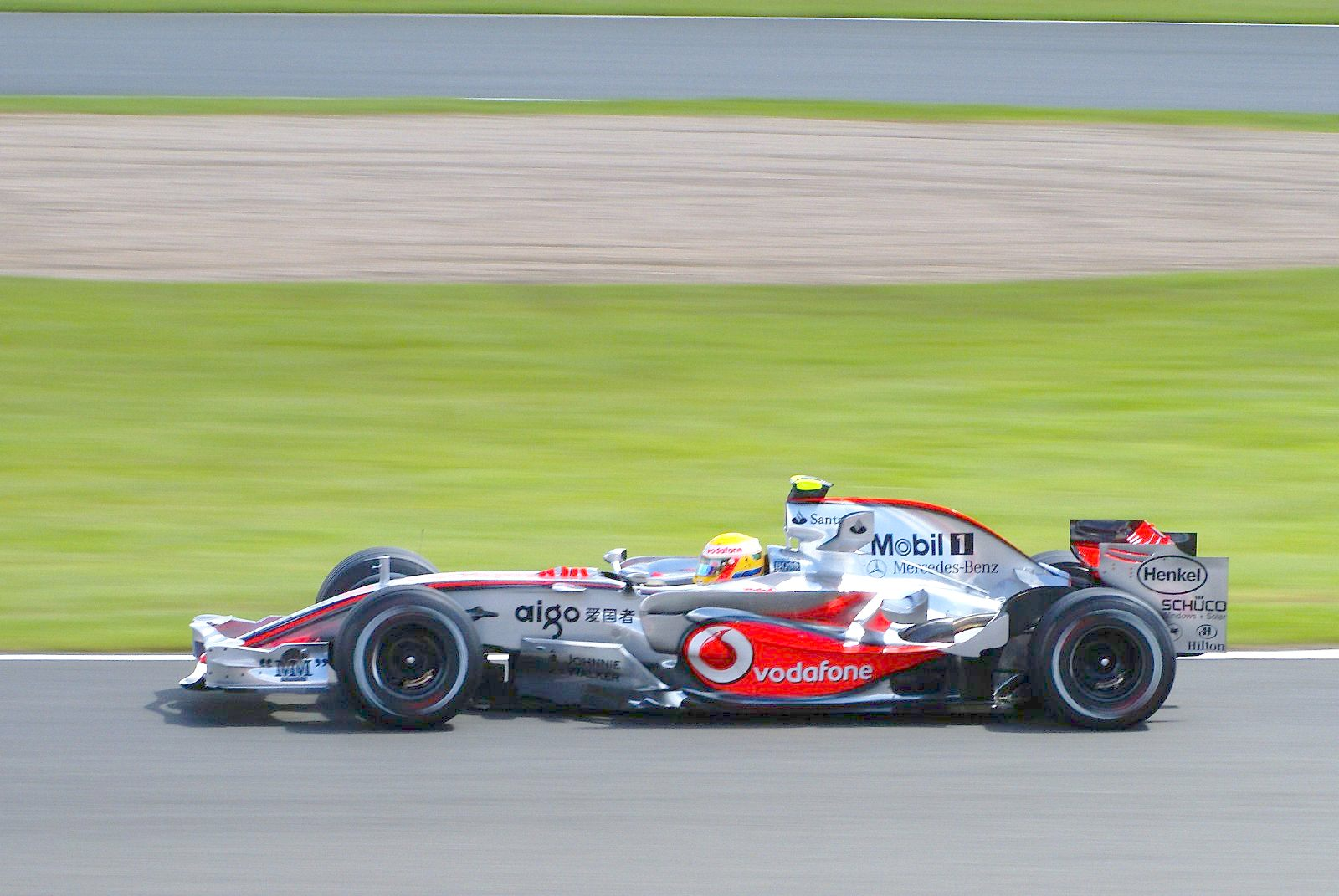
After starting from pole position, Hamilton led until his first stop. He lost ground to Räikkönen and Alonso from that moment onwards, and finished third.

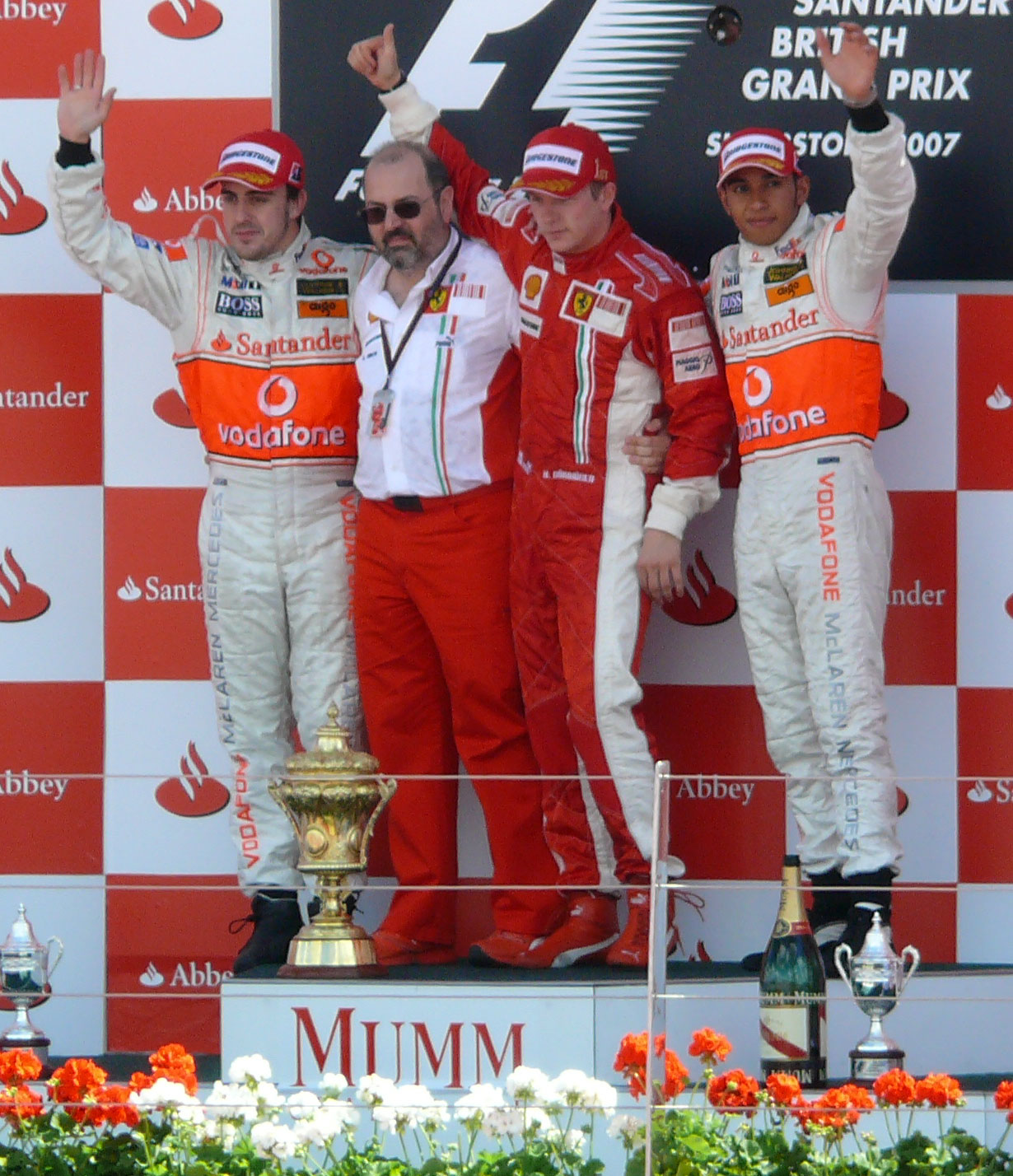
Podium: First Räikkönen, second Alonso, third Hamilton and Ferrari team representative Gilles Simon.

Felipe Massa stalled on the grid, leading to a second formation lap and causing the Brazilian to start from the pit lane, joining Takuma Sato, who also started from the pits. Hamilton led from the start with Räikkönen closely following and Alonso a few seconds behind them. Hamilton led the race until lap sixteen, when he made his stop and rejoined in fifth; his car briefly lurched forward with the fuel hose attached when Hamilton reacted to the 'lollipop' board being turned over. Räikkönen stopped three laps later and came out of the pit in front of Hamilton to take the race lead. Another three laps later Alonso took a good pit stop and came out in front of both of the previous race leaders.

As Alonso was short-fuelled in the first set of pit stops in order to jump into the race lead, it meant that he had to stop quite early compared to his rival. McLaren's plan was to use the superior pace of a lighter car to build up a large gap between him and Räikkönen before the second set of pit stops, but the traffic played into Räikkönen's hands and when Alonso had to pit Räikkönen resumed the race lead. He was able to make his final stop and rejoined without losing first position.

Behind the leaders, Massa was forcing his way through the pack to make up as many places as possible from the back, and finished in fifth behind a defensive Robert Kubica. Nick Heidfeld took sixth, while Heikki Kovalainen and Giancarlo Fisichella brought the two Renaults home in seventh and eighth. Rubens Barrichello and Jenson Button were taking advantage of being quite far back by investing in a one stop strategy and they finished ninth and tenth respectively. Nico Rosberg had a good race taking back quite a few places from the start - with points a possibility, but after a bad first pit stop he had to fight back to gain twelfth. His team-mate, Wurz, finished one place behind him in thirteenth after having tried to overtake Scott Speed and putting the American out of the race with broken suspension.

David Coulthard took a good eleventh position; his team-mate, Webber, retired due to a full hydraulics failure. Adrian Sutil retired after a large engine failure going towards the Stowe corner. Toyota suffered the worst problems as both of their cars went out of the race, Ralf Schumacher retiring with a wheel fixation problem, and his teammate, Trulli retiring with handling problems. Anthony Davidson, after a good weekend of practice and an unlucky qualifying session, had to retire his Super Aguri car when he felt vibrations from the underside of the car. Liuzzi retired his car with gearbox failure but was ultimately still classified in 16th place.

Räikkönen continued from the second stint of pit stops to take the win a couple of seconds ahead of Alonso. It was Räikkönen's second straight win after being victorious at the French Grand Prix the week before. Alonso, finishing second, told the Spanish press that he was adamant that he would catch up with Hamilton in the drivers championship saying that, "With normal races, sooner or later I will close the gap. I must always be one step higher than him on the podium." The British driver finished third to lose two points in the championship to the chasing Alonso, but also achieving his ninth podium out of nine race starts, equalling Jim Clark's record. Hamilton also set the record for the most consecutive points finishes from a debut race.

Following the race Ferrari chief Luca di Montezemolo complained that although Räikkönen had now won more races than any other driver in 2007, he was not leading the championship. Di Montezemolo said: "This is unsporting, it's wrong: F1 shouldn't be a sport for calculators, it should be for winners."

== Classification ==
=== Qualifying ===
Pos.	No.	Driver	Constructor	Q1	Q2	Q3	Grid
1	2	(United Kingdom) Lewis Hamilton	McLaren-Mercedes	1:19.885	1:19.400	1:19.997	1
2	6	(Finland) Kimi Räikkönen	Ferrari	1:19.753	1:19.252	1:20.099	2
3	1	(Spain) Fernando Alonso	McLaren-Mercedes	1:19.330	1:19.152	1:20.147	3
4	5	(Brazil) Felipe Massa	Ferrari	1:19.790	1:19.421	1:20.265	PL
5	10	(Poland) Robert Kubica	BMW Sauber	1:20.294	1:20.054	1:20.401	5
6	11	(Germany) Ralf Schumacher	Toyota	1:20.513	1:19.860	1:20.516	6
7	4	(Finland) Heikki Kovalainen	Renault	1:20.570	1:20.077	1:20.721	7
8	3	(Italy) Giancarlo Fisichella	Renault	1:20.842	1:20.042	1:20.775	8
9	9	(Germany) Nick Heidfeld	BMW Sauber	1:20.534	1:20.178	1:20.894	9
10	12	(Italy) Jarno Trulli	Toyota	1:21.150	1:20.133	1:21.240	10
11	15	(Australia) Mark Webber	Red Bull-Renault	1:20.583	1:20.235		11
12	14	(United Kingdom) David Coulthard	Red Bull-Renault	1:21.154	1:20.329		12
13	17	(Austria) Alexander Wurz	Williams-Toyota	1:20.830	1:20.350		13
14	8	(Brazil) Rubens Barrichello	Honda	1:21.169	1:20.364		14
15	19	(United States) Scott Speed	Toro Rosso-Ferrari	1:20.834	1:20.515		15
16	18	(Italy) Vitantonio Liuzzi	Toro Rosso-Ferrari	1:21.160	1:20.823		16
17	16	(Germany) Nico Rosberg	Williams-Toyota	1:21.219			17
18	7	(United Kingdom) Jenson Button	Honda	1:21.335			18
19	23	(United Kingdom) Anthony Davidson	Super Aguri-Honda	1:21.448			19
20	20	(Germany) Adrian Sutil	Spyker-Ferrari	1:22.019			20
21	22	(Japan) Takuma Sato	Super Aguri-Honda	1:22.045			PL
22	21	(Netherlands) Christijan Albers	Spyker-Ferrari	1:22.586			21

=== Race ===
Pos.	No.	Driver	Constructor	Laps	Time/Retired	Grid	Points
1	6	(Finland) Kimi Räikkönen	Ferrari	59	1:21:43.074	2	10
2	1	(Spain) Fernando Alonso	McLaren-Mercedes	59	+2.459	3	8
3	2	(United Kingdom) Lewis Hamilton	McLaren-Mercedes	59	+39.373	1	6
4	10	(Poland) Robert Kubica	BMW Sauber	59	+53.319	5	5
5	5	(Brazil) Felipe Massa	Ferrari	59	+54.063	PL^{1}	4
6	9	(Germany) Nick Heidfeld	BMW Sauber	59	+56.336	9	3
7	4	(Finland) Heikki Kovalainen	Renault	58	+1 lap	7	2
8	3	(Italy) Giancarlo Fisichella	Renault	58	+1 lap	8	1
9	8	(Brazil) Rubens Barrichello	Honda	58	+1 lap	14	
10	7	(United Kingdom) Jenson Button	Honda	58	+1 lap	18	
11	14	(United Kingdom) David Coulthard	Red Bull-Renault	58	+1 lap	12	
12	16	(Germany) Nico Rosberg	Williams-Toyota	58	+1 lap	17	
13	17	(Austria) Alexander Wurz	Williams-Toyota	58	+1 lap	13	
14	22	(Japan) Takuma Sato	Super Aguri-Honda	57	+2 laps	PL^{2}	
15	21	(Netherlands) Christijan Albers	Spyker-Ferrari	57	+2 laps	21	
16	18	(Italy) Vitantonio Liuzzi	Toro Rosso-Ferrari	53	Gearbox	16	
Ret	12	(Italy) Jarno Trulli	Toyota	43	Handling	10	
Ret	23	(United Kingdom) Anthony Davidson	Super Aguri-Honda	35	Mechanical	19	
Ret	19	(United States) Scott Speed	Toro Rosso-Ferrari	29	Collision	15	
Ret	11	(Germany) Ralf Schumacher	Toyota	22	Wheel	6	
Ret	20	(Germany) Adrian Sutil	Spyker-Ferrari	16	Engine	20	
Ret	15	(Australia) Mark Webber	Red Bull-Renault	8	Hydraulics	11	

Notes

- ^1 – Felipe Massa started from pitlane after he stalled on the grid prior to the first formation lap.
- ^2 – Takuma Sato started from pitlane.

== Championship standings after the race ==
Drivers' Championship standings

+/–	Pos.	Driver	Points
	1	(United Kingdom) Lewis Hamilton	70
	2	(Spain) Fernando Alonso	58
1	3	(Finland) Kimi Räikkönen	52
1	4	(Brazil) Felipe Massa	51
	5	(Germany) Nick Heidfeld	33

Constructors' Championship standings

+/–	Pos.	Constructor	Points
	1	(United Kingdom) McLaren-Mercedes	128
	2	(Italy) Ferrari	103
	3	(Germany) BMW Sauber	56
	4	(France) Renault	31
	5	(United Kingdom) Williams-Toyota	13

- Note: Only the top five positions are included for both sets of standings.

== See also ==
- 2007 Silverstone GP2 Series round

Previous race: 2007 French Grand Prix	FIA Formula One World Championship; 2007 season	Next race: 2007 European Grand Prix
Previous race: 2006 British Grand Prix	British Grand Prix	Next race: 2008 British Grand Prix
