= Colin Kolles =

Romanian-German F1 team manager

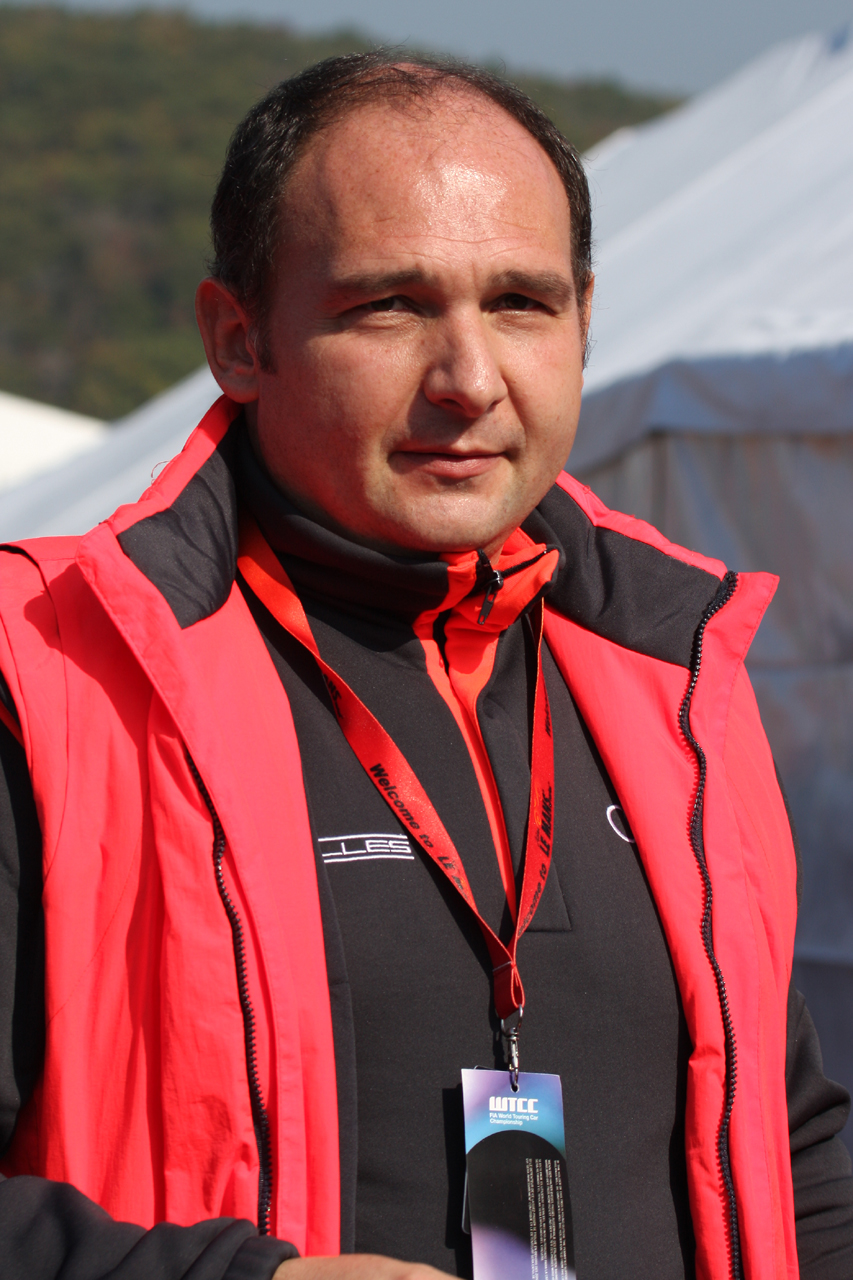
- Kolles in 2009
- Born: Călin Colesnic; 13 December 1967 (age 58); Timișoara, Romania

Colin Kolles (born Călin Colesnic; born 13 December 1967 in Timișoara) is a Romanian-German former team principal and managing director of the Hispania Racing F1 Team, previously holding a similar position at the team known under the names Jordan, Midland, Spyker and Force India from 2005 to 2008. He was an advisor to Caterham F1 and had a part in the unsuccessful Forza Rossa Racing project.

== Career ==
Kolles, who lives in Ingolstadt, is qualified as a dentist which was the family business. In 2000, he entered racing by establishing a team now known as Vanwall Racing Team with his father Romulus in the German Formula Three Championship, and later in the Formula Three Euroseries. He was appointed as Managing Director of the Jordan Grand Prix team by its new owner, Alex Shnaider, on 19 January 2005.

Despite receiving some criticism in 2005 for his "hard-headed" approach, Kolles kept his position as Managing Director of the team, presiding over the launch of the Midland M16 chassis before the 2006 season began. Following the team's takeover by Spyker and then Force India, he remained as managing director.

Despite running a Formula One team, Kolles has still been called upon to use his dentistry skills. Before the 2005 Turkish Grand Prix, he was forced to perform dental surgery on his driver Tiago Monteiro, who was suffering from toothache that was severe enough to potentially keep him out of the race. He also performed a similar procedure on Midland's other driver Christijan Albers at the 2006 French Grand Prix.

In November 2008, it was announced that Force India chairman Vijay Mallya was to take over the role of Team Principal for 2009, leaving Kolles without a major role in the team. He remained contracted to the team until 31 October 2009, when he resigned as a director.

Kolles returned to Kodewa in 2009 where he fielded a pair of ex-works Audi R10s for sportscar stalwart Michael Krumm, Charles Zwolsman Jr, ex-single seater drivers Andrew Meyrick and Christian Bakkerud, and sometime Formula One drivers Christijan Albers and Narain Karthikeyan in the Le Mans Series and 24 Hours of Le Mans. He oversaw Kodewa'e. He left the position in December 2011.

In July 2013, it emerged that Kolles had previously tried to blackmail Mercedes-Benz Motorsport boss Toto Wolff after he had allegedly recorded Wolff making negative remarks about the Mercedes F1 Team's management. The two settled the matter privately.
