= Spyker F1 =

Former Dutch Formula One racing team

Spyker
- Full name: Spyker F1 Team
- Base: Silverstone, Northamptonshire, United Kingdom
- Team principal(s): Colin Kolles
- Technical director: James Key
- Noted drivers: (Germany) Adrian Sutil (Netherlands) Christijan Albers (Germany) Markus Winkelhock (Japan) Sakon Yamamoto
- Previous name: Midland F1 Racing
- Next name: Force India F1 Team

Formula One World Championship career
- First entry: 2007 Australian Grand Prix
- Races entered: 17
- Engines: Ferrari
- Constructors' Championships: 0
- Drivers' Championships: 0
- Race victories: 0
- Points: 1
- Pole positions: 0
- Fastest laps: 0
- Final entry: 2007 Brazilian Grand Prix

The Spyker F1 Team, known as the Etihad Aldar Spyker F1 Team for sponsorship reasons, was a Formula One team that competed in the 2007 Formula One World Championship with a Dutch licence. It was created by Spyker Cars after their buyout of the short-lived Midland F1 (formerly Jordan Grand Prix) team. The change to the Spyker name was accompanied by a switch in racing livery from the red, grey and white previously used by Midland, to an orange and silver scheme—already seen on the Spyker Spyder GT2-R—orange being the national colour and the auto racing colour of the Netherlands. At the end of the 2007 season, the team was sold to Vijay Mallya and renamed Force India.

Spyker F1 Team was only the second Formula One constructor to represent the Netherlands after Boro Racing that competed in the 1976 and 1977 seasons.

== Background ==
Although created in 2006, the team's roots can be traced back to the year 1991, when it was founded as Jordan Grand Prix. The Silverstone-based squad and facilities were bought by the Midland group in 2005 and renamed Midland F1 in 2006, before being sold to Spyker Cars towards the end of the 2006 season.

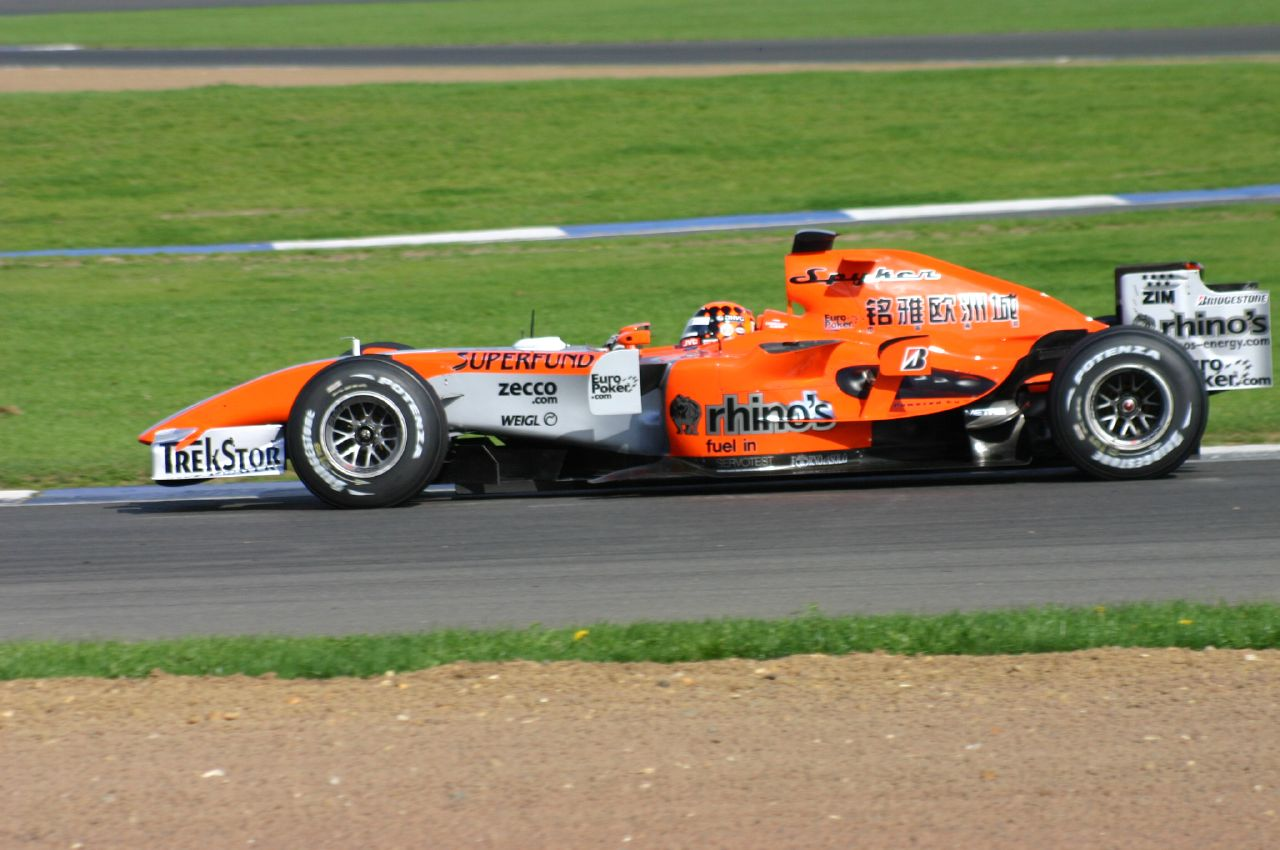
Midland M16 livery after the purchase by Spyker

Rumours had been floating about in the paddock throughout the mid-season about the possible sale of the team, less than two years after Alex Shnaider originally bought it from Eddie Jordan. Reports suggested a price tag of $128 million and that Shnaider was seriously considering the possibility of the sale. Formula One teams had become more valuable because no additional teams could enter after 2008, with the maximum of 12 places already filled.

On 9 September 2006, it was revealed that the team was sold to Spyker Cars, a Dutch manufacturer of hand-built cars. Spyker paid $106.6 million for the team. On 10 September, ITV commentators said that both Shnaider and former consultant Johnny Herbert were no longer involved in the team since the announcement of the sale.

Former Midland drivers Christijan Albers and Tiago Monteiro were retained for the remaining part of the 2006 season, while it was also confirmed at Spyker's debut race in China that Albers would be staying with the successor team for the 2007 season. As part of the purchase of Midland by Spyker, the cars had a revised livery for the final three races of 2006. The name of the team also changed to Spyker MF1 Racing, as FIA regulations preclude a change of a team's name during a season but do allow for a sponsor name to be added to the front.

== 2007 season ==
The previous team boss of Midland, Colin Kolles, remained as team principal into 2007. Michiel Mol became the new Director of F1 Racing and member of the Spyker board, and Mike Gascoyne became Chief Technology Officer from the end of the 2006 season. The team used customer 2006-spec Ferrari engines in 2007, replacing the Toyota units, which went to the Williams team. Although the team remained based in the UK, it chose to register under the Dutch motor racing authority and therefore run under the Dutch flag during 2007, reflecting its new ownership.

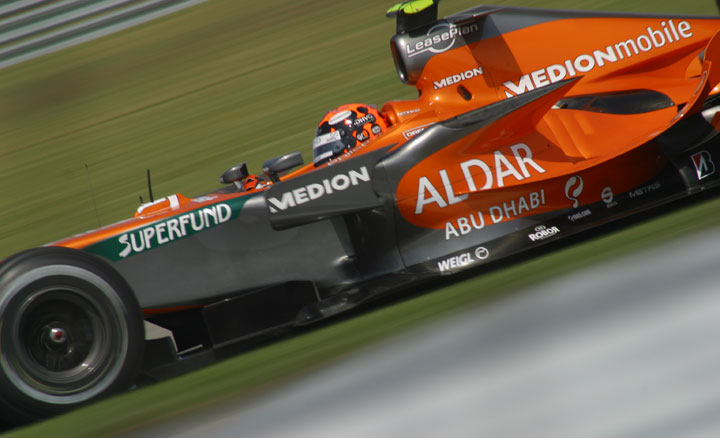
A Spyker in 2007 livery

For the second race driver, Spyker signed one of their 2006 third drivers, Adrian Sutil, to drive for the team in 2007. The official FIA entry list for 2007 was posted on various websites on 4 December 2006, and on the list the Spyker F1 Team was assigned car numbers 20 and 21, but only Christijan Albers' name was made official on the entry list, with the second seat, and car number 21 left TBA, since Sutil had not been confirmed at the time. However, the car numbers were swapped inside the team as Albers wanted to drive a car with an odd number, hence Albers (and later Winkelhock and Yamamoto) raced with number 21 and Sutil 20. Spyker signed four test and reserve drivers for the 2007 season: Adrián Vallés, Fairuz Fauzy, Giedo van der Garde and Markus Winkelhock.

In March, Spyker announced a sponsor deal with Etihad Airways and Aldar Properties, two companies from Abu Dhabi, United Arab Emirates. The official name of the entrant during the season was Etihad Aldar Spyker F1 Team.

On 10 July, Albers was released from his Spyker contract due to a lack of sponsorship money, which would have funded the team's development programme. Mol described it as "one of the toughest decisions of my career". Despite former Red Bull Racing driver Christian Klien testing for the team on 12 July 2007, Albers' replacement for the 2007 European Grand Prix was Winkelhock.

During the 2007 European Grand Prix, Winkelhock became the only driver to lead a Grand Prix in a Spyker, due to the team's tyre selection. However, Winkelhock did not keep his race drive as this went to Sakon Yamamoto.

In August, the new B-Spec Spyker model, which the team hoped to use at the 2007 Turkish Grand Prix, failed the rear crash test which is set by the FIA. All cars must pass these tests to be allowed to race. However, a few days later it was confirmed that the car had passed the crash test in time to compete in the Italian Grand Prix.

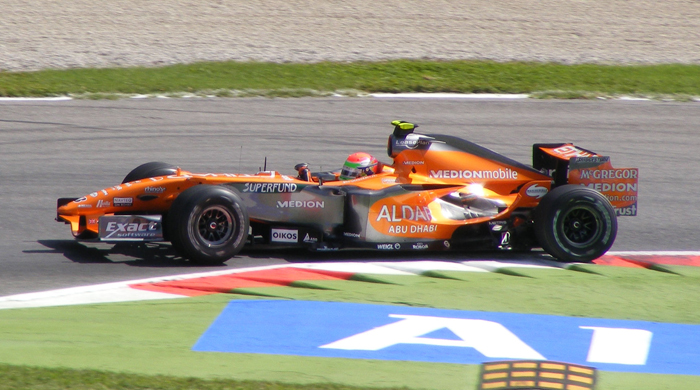
Spyker during the 2007 season

On 30 September at the 2007 Japanese Grand Prix, the team scored its first and only championship point. Sutil finished 9th on the track, but was promoted to 8th place and into the points scoring positions when stewards ruled post-race that Toro Rosso's Vitantonio Liuzzi had overtaken Sutil under a yellow flag on lap 55; Liuzzi was subsequently given a 25-second penalty that dropped his time below Sutil's.

On 14 August, Spyker Cars announced that it might need to sell all or part of the team due to a potential split of the team from its parent company. The team was sold to a consortium named "Orange India" led by Indian businessman Vijay Mallya and Dutch entrepreneur (and existing board member) Michiel Mol after approval by Spyker's shareholders. Mallya attended the Chinese Grand Prix as a team owner. The team was renamed Force India for the 2008 season.

== Complete Formula One results ==
(key) (results in bold indicate pole position)

| Year | Chassis | Engine | Tyres | Drivers | 1 | 2 | 3 | 4 | 5 | 6 | 7 | 8 | 9 | 10 | 11 | 12 | 13 | 14 | 15 | 16 | 17 | Points | WCC |
|---|---|---|---|---|---|---|---|---|---|---|---|---|---|---|---|---|---|---|---|---|---|---|---|
| 2007 | F8-VII; F8-VIIB | Ferrari 056 2.4 V8 | **B** | | AUS | MAL | BHR | ESP | MON | CAN | USA | FRA | GBR | EUR | HUN | TUR | ITA | BEL | JPN | CHN | BRA | 1 | 10th |
| 2007 | F8-VII; F8-VIIB | Ferrari 056 2.4 V8 | **B** | (Germany) Adrian Sutil | 17 | Ret | 15 | 13 | Ret | Ret | 14 | 17 | Ret | Ret | 17 | 21^{†} | 19 | 14 | 8 | Ret | Ret | 1 | 10th |
| 2007 | F8-VII; F8-VIIB | Ferrari 056 2.4 V8 | **B** | (Netherlands) Christijan Albers | Ret | Ret | 14 | 14 | 19^{†} | Ret | 15 | Ret | 15 | | | | | | | | | 1 | 10th |
| 2007 | F8-VII; F8-VIIB | Ferrari 056 2.4 V8 | **B** | (Germany) Markus Winkelhock | | | | | | | | | | Ret | | | | | | | | 1 | 10th |
| 2007 | F8-VII; F8-VIIB | Ferrari 056 2.4 V8 | **B** | (Japan) Sakon Yamamoto | | | | | | | | | | | Ret | 20 | 20 | 17 | 12 | 17 | Ret | 1 | 10th |

^{†} Driver did not finish the race but was classified as they had completed more than 90% of the race distance.
