= 2007 Australian Grand Prix =

Coordinates: 37°50′59″S 144°58′06″E

Race 1 of 17 in the 2007 Formula One World Championship
← Previous race	Next race →

Race details
- Date: 18 March 2007
- Official name: 2007 Formula 1 ING Australian Grand Prix
- Location: Melbourne Grand Prix Circuit, Melbourne, Australia
- Course: Temporary street circuit
- Course length: 5.303 km (3.295 miles)
- Distance: 58 laps, 307.574 km (191.118 miles)
- Weather: Clear with temperatures reaching up to 21 °C (70 °F)
- Attendance: 105,000

Pole position
Driver	(Finland) Kimi Räikkönen	Ferrari
- Time: 1:26.072

Fastest lap
Driver	(Finland) Kimi Räikkönen	Ferrari
- Time: 1:25.235 on lap 41

Podium
First	(Finland) Kimi Räikkönen	Ferrari
Second	(Spain) Fernando Alonso	McLaren-Mercedes
Third	(United Kingdom) Lewis Hamilton	McLaren-Mercedes

The 2007 Australian Grand Prix, officially the 2007 Formula 1 ING Australian Grand Prix, was a Formula One motor race held on 18 March 2007 at the Melbourne Grand Prix Circuit. It was the first race of the 2007 Formula One World Championship. The 58 lap race was won by Kimi Räikkönen for Ferrari after starting from pole position. Fernando Alonso finished second in his McLaren car, with teammate Lewis Hamilton third on his Grand Prix debut.

Räikkönen started the race alongside Alonso, but in the start Alonso was passed by BMW Sauber driver Nick Heidfeld and Hamilton, who started third and fourth. Räikkönen controlled the race from the front of the field, with Alonso regaining second place after overtaking Hamilton during the second round of pit stops.

The Grand Prix was also the first since the 2000 Malaysian Grand Prix where all Formula One entrants utilized Bridgestone tyres as Michelin quit the sport after the 2006 season.

== Background ==
=== Friday drivers ===
Constructor	Nat	Driver
BMW Sauber	(Germany)	Sebastian Vettel
Williams-Toyota	(Japan)	Kazuki Nakajima

== Practice ==
The morning session of Friday practice, run in wet weather, saw McLaren's Fernando Alonso take the fastest lap of the session, over a second faster than the next fastest time set by Ferrari's Felipe Massa. The rain dried up for the afternoon session which saw the two Ferraris of Massa and Kimi Räikkönen first and second respectively with the fastest non-Ferrari driver, Lewis Hamilton, just under a tenth of a second behind Räikkönen. The rest of the top six were from different teams with fourth place going to Giancarlo Fisichella of Renault. Nick Heidfeld in the BMW Sauber was fifth and Alexander Wurz's Williams completed the top six. "This was a positive start to the weekend" Massa commented, "but of course what counts is tomorrow's qualifying and most of all, Sunday's race."

The morning session of Saturday brought with it sunny skies, but also a light drizzle at the start of the session. This forced teams who went out early to use their wet tires, but what little water was on the track dried up quickly enough to have no effect on any racer on dry tires. Räikkönen was the consistent pace-setter and topped the chart with a 1:26.064. Fisichella pushed his Renault to second with a time of 1:26.454. Rookie Lewis Hamilton came third over his teammate, the double and defending World Champion Fernando Alonso who came in at seventh. The slowest team of 2006, Super Aguri, got into the top ten with fourth and tenth for Anthony Davidson and Takuma Sato, respectively. Felipe Massa and Nick Heidfeld completed the top six.

== Qualifying ==
Räikkönen followed up his pace-setting morning practice performance by topping the times in Part One of the Qualifying session. Mark Webber set the early benchmark with a 1:27.799, but Lewis Hamilton knocked one and one tenths off that, with a lap of 1:26.674 – his personal fastest lap of the meeting, before Räikkönen took control. Rubens Barrichello and David Coulthard found themselves knocked out of qualifying, along with the Toro Rossos and the Spykers.

Fernando Alonso took command of Part Two with a lap of 1:25.326 to put him at the top of the leaderboard, with teammate Hamilton closely behind in third. BMW's Nick Heidfeld split the McLarens with second. However, Felipe Massa was knocked out of qualifying after an error in turns nine and ten brought his Ferrari to a halt, meaning he started the race from 16th on the grid, which would later become 22nd on the grid due to an engine change. Super Aguri's Takuma Sato made it through to part three. But, along with Massa: Anthony Davidson; both the Williams cars of Rosberg and Wurz; Renault's rookie Heikki Kovalainen and Honda's Jenson Button all went out.

Alonso again set the benchmark in Part Three with a time of 1:27.050. But he was soon knocked off top spot by Räikkönen, who went a second quicker with a lap of 1:26.072. Räikkönen kept pole position, with Alonso second, but Nick Heidfeld was third after Lewis Hamilton had an untidy middle sector which saw him end up in fourth. Robert Kubica was fifth, with Giancarlo Fisichella sixth. Räikkönen became the first driver since Juan Manuel Fangio at the 1956 Argentine Grand Prix to secure pole position in his very first race for Ferrari.

Red Bull's Mark Webber was seventh with the Toyotas of Ralf Schumacher and Trulli eighth and ninth. Super Aguri's Sato rounded out the top ten.

=== Qualifying classification ===
Pos.	No.	Driver	Constructor	Q1	Q2	Q3	Grid
1	6	(Finland) Kimi Räikkönen	Ferrari	1:26.644	1:25.644	1:26.072	1
2	1	(Spain) Fernando Alonso	McLaren-Mercedes	1:26.697	1:25.326	1:26.493	2
3	9	(Germany) Nick Heidfeld	BMW Sauber	1:26.895	1:25.358	1:26.556	3
4	2	(United Kingdom) Lewis Hamilton	McLaren-Mercedes	1:26.674	1:25.577	1:26.755	4
5	10	(Poland) Robert Kubica	BMW Sauber	1:26.696	1:25.882	1:27.347	5
6	3	(Italy) Giancarlo Fisichella	Renault	1:27.270	1:25.944	1:27.634	6
7	15	(Australia) Mark Webber	Red Bull-Renault	1:26.978	1:26.623	1:27.934	7
8	12	(Italy) Jarno Trulli	Toyota	1:27.014	1:26.688	1:28.404	8
9	11	(Germany) Ralf Schumacher	Toyota	1:27.328	1:26.739	1:28.692	9
10	22	(Japan) Takuma Sato	Super Aguri-Honda	1:27.365	1:26.758	1:28.871	10
11	23	(United Kingdom) Anthony Davidson	Super Aguri-Honda	1:26.986	1:26.909		11
12	16	(Germany) Nico Rosberg	Williams-Toyota	1:27.596	1:26.914		12
13	4	(Finland) Heikki Kovalainen	Renault	1:27.529	1:26.964		13
14	7	(United Kingdom) Jenson Button	Honda	1:27.540	1:27.264		14
15	17	(Austria) Alexander Wurz	Williams-Toyota	1:27.479	1:27.393		15
16	5	(Brazil) Felipe Massa	Ferrari	1:26.712	No time^{1}		22^{2}
17	8	(Brazil) Rubens Barrichello	Honda	1:27.679			16
18	19	(United States) Scott Speed	Toro Rosso-Ferrari	1:28.305			17
19	14	(United Kingdom) David Coulthard	Red Bull-Renault	1:28.579			18
20	18	(Italy) Vitantonio Liuzzi	Toro Rosso-Ferrari	1:29.267			19
21	20	(Germany) Adrian Sutil	Spyker-Ferrari	1:29.339			20
22	21	(Netherlands) Christijan Albers	Spyker-Ferrari	1:31.932			21

Notes

- ^1 – Felipe Massa failed to set a time in Q2 due to a gearbox problem.
- ^2 – Felipe Massa was given a ten-place grid penalty for an engine change.

== Race ==
Race day saw a crowd of 105,000 people attend the opening round of the 2007 season, and the first race of the "post-Schumacher" era. The only changes before the race were that Felipe Massa started last after an engine-change, and Christijan Albers opted to start from the pitlane.

At the start, Räikkönen got clear off the line. Alonso was passed by Heidfeld on the left and was stuck behind Räikkönen to his front. Hamilton was also briefly stuck behind the leading three before taking the outside line coming into the first corner to take third place; Alonso dropped to fourth position. McLaren team principal Ron Dennis would later accuse BMW of "showboating". Anthony Davidson stalled on the grid and after getting underway hit Adrian Sutil, but managed to keep going. By lap three, Räikkönen was starting to pull away from Heidfeld and by lap five the Finn had a two and a half second lead on the German. Meanwhile, debutant Lewis Hamilton was still holding onto third place from teammate Alonso.

Christijan Albers in the Spyker became the first driver to retire in the new season, missing his braking point at the Sports Center corner and hitting the tire barrier. The first to make a pit stop was second place Heidfeld on lap fifteen; four laps later Kimi Räikkönen pitted and came out in fourth behind Hamilton, now leading on his Grand Prix debut; Alonso and Robert Kubica. Alonso was the first of the two McLarens to pit, suggesting that Hamilton was on a heavier fuel load than his Spanish teammate.

The Briton's McLaren pitted a lap later and rejoined behind Räikkönen, who had now reclaimed his lead, but ahead of Heidfeld, who had now dropped to fifth position, and Alonso, despite being held up by the lone Spyker of Adrian Sutil, who received a drive through penalty for the infringement. Honda's Jenson Button also received a drive through penalty for speeding in the pit lane. Toro Rosso's Scott Speed became the race's second retirement after two of his tires deflated and he crashed at the Clark chicane on lap 31.

Six laps later at the same chicane saw Nico Rosberg overtake Ralf Schumacher for seventh place and soon pulled away from the Toyota. On the same lap, Kubica became the third retirement of the race after problems with his gearbox, which was the part of the car the Polish driver had been most worried about during the pre-season. At the front, meanwhile, Räikkönen was increasing his lead over Hamilton, his lead now over 18 seconds.

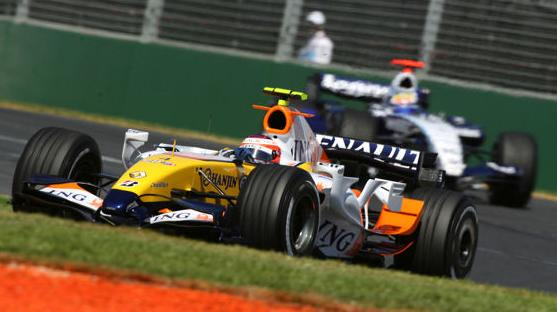
Heikki Kovalainen had a disappointing first race for Renault, shown here leading Nico Rosberg during the race

Heikki Kovalainen was having, in comparison with Hamilton, a disappointing first race: spinning at the Jones chicane on his 40th lap, which led to him losing a place to Felipe Massa, and running wide on several occasions during the early part of the race. Renault team chief Flavio Briatore described the Finn's debut as "rubbish". Teammate Giancarlo Fisichella was having an uneventful race, as he was not involved in any racing incidents.

Back at the front, Räikkönen made his final scheduled pit stop of the race and rejoined in third, behind the two McLarens of Hamilton, now leading the race for the second time, and Alonso. Unlike the first set of stops, it was Hamilton who would be the first of the two McLarens to pit, allowing Alonso to lead the race for the first time. Alonso pitted a lap later and this time rejoined ahead of his rookie teammate, while Räikkönen took his lead back.

On lap 49, David Coulthard's attempt to pass Alexander Wurz ended with Coulthard's car vaulting over the Williams, narrowly missing the Austrian driver's head. Both drivers escaped unharmed.

Despite a small water leak towards the end, it was Räikkönen who won the race, 7.2 seconds from Alonso and over eighteen seconds from Hamilton, who became the first driver to finish on the podium on their debut since Jacques Villeneuve at the 1996 Australian Grand Prix; it was also the first time a driver had won on their first race for Ferrari since Nigel Mansell at the 1989 Brazilian Grand Prix and also the first race in World Championship history where all three podium finishers were making their debut for their team, disregarding 1950 where all drivers made their World Championship debuts.

The value of Räikkönen’s victory was enhanced by the fact that his radio broke early in the race, leaving him unable to communicate with the pit crew; instead, he received information via the old-fashioned pit boards held up by his mechanics. As Räikkönen celebrated on the podium, Ferrari team principal Jean Todt handed him a mobile phone. On the other end of the line was, reportedly, Michael Schumacher but "the connection was pretty bad, and I couldn't hear a thing," Räikkönen said with a sly grin.

Post race there was some criticism of Bridgestone because the rules mandated that the softer tire compound should be "visibly distinguishable" while the car is on track. The tiny white dot on the outer side of the tires proved inadequate. For the next race at Sepang they would go on to paint the "second from outside" groove with white paint.

=== Race classification ===
Pos.	No.	Driver	Constructor	Laps	Time/Retired	Grid	Points
1	6	(Finland) Kimi Räikkönen	Ferrari	58	1:25:28.770	1	10
2	1	(Spain) Fernando Alonso	McLaren-Mercedes	58	+7.242	2	8
3	2	(United Kingdom) Lewis Hamilton	McLaren-Mercedes	58	+18.595	4	6
4	9	(Germany) Nick Heidfeld	BMW Sauber	58	+38.763	3	5
5	3	(Italy) Giancarlo Fisichella	Renault	58	+1:06.469	6	4
6	5	(Brazil) Felipe Massa	Ferrari	58	+1:06.805	22	3
7	16	(Germany) Nico Rosberg	Williams-Toyota	57	+1 Lap	12	2
8	11	(Germany) Ralf Schumacher	Toyota	57	+1 Lap	9	1
9	12	(Italy) Jarno Trulli	Toyota	57	+1 Lap	8	
10	4	(Finland) Heikki Kovalainen	Renault	57	+1 Lap	13	
11	8	(Brazil) Rubens Barrichello	Honda	57	+1 Lap	16	
12	22	(Japan) Takuma Sato	Super Aguri-Honda	57	+1 Lap	10	
13	15	(Australia) Mark Webber	Red Bull-Renault	57	+1 Lap	7	
14	18	(Italy) Vitantonio Liuzzi	Toro Rosso-Ferrari	57	+1 Lap	19	
15	7	(United Kingdom) Jenson Button	Honda	57	+1 Lap	14	
16	23	(United Kingdom) Anthony Davidson	Super Aguri-Honda	56	+2 Laps	11	
17	20	(Germany) Adrian Sutil	Spyker-Ferrari	56	+2 Laps	20	
Ret	17	(Austria) Alexander Wurz	Williams-Toyota	48	Collision	15	
Ret	14	(United Kingdom) David Coulthard	Red Bull-Renault	48	Collision	18	
Ret	10	(Poland) Robert Kubica	BMW Sauber	36	Gearbox	5	
Ret	19	(United States) Scott Speed	Toro Rosso-Ferrari	28	Puncture	17	
Ret	21	(Netherlands) Christijan Albers	Spyker-Ferrari	10	Accident	PL^{3}	

Notes

- ^3 – Christijan Albers started the race from the pitlane.

== Championship standings after the race ==
Drivers' Championship standings

Pos.	Driver	Points
1	(Finland) Kimi Räikkönen	10
2	(Spain) Fernando Alonso	8
3	(United Kingdom) Lewis Hamilton	6
4	(Germany) Nick Heidfeld	5
5	(Italy) Giancarlo Fisichella	4

Constructors' Championship standings

Pos.	Constructor	Points
1	(United Kingdom) McLaren-Mercedes	14
2	(Italy) Ferrari	13
3	(Germany) BMW Sauber	5
4	(France) Renault	4
5	(United Kingdom) Williams-Toyota	2

- Note: Only the top five positions are included for both sets of standings.

== See also ==
- 2007 Australian Grand Prix F3 Support Race

Previous race: 2006 Brazilian Grand Prix	FIA Formula One World Championship; 2007 season	Next race: 2007 Malaysian Grand Prix
Previous race: 2006 Australian Grand Prix	Australian Grand Prix	Next race: 2008 Australian Grand Prix
