= 2007 European Grand Prix =

10th round of the 2007 Formula One season

Race 10 of 17 in the 2007 Formula One World Championship
← Previous race	Next race →
- The Nürburgring (GP track)

Race details
- Date: 22 July 2007
- Official name: 2007 Formula 1 Grand Prix of Europe
- Location: Nürburgring, Nürburg, Germany
- Course: Permanent racing facility
- Course length: 5.148 km (3.199 miles)
- Distance: 60 laps, 308.863 km (191.919 miles)
- Weather: Heavy Rain on Lap 1. Drying track at restart. Light Rain before the finish.

Pole position
Driver	(Finland) Kimi Räikkönen	Ferrari
- Time: 1:31.450

Fastest lap
Driver	(Brazil) Felipe Massa	Ferrari
- Time: 1:32.853 on lap 34

Podium
First	(Spain) Fernando Alonso	McLaren-Mercedes
Second	(Brazil) Felipe Massa	Ferrari
Third	(Australia) Mark Webber	Red Bull-Renault

The 2007 European Grand Prix (formally the 2007 Formula 1 Grand Prix of Europe) was a Formula One motor race held at Nürburgring, Nürburg, Germany on 22 July 2007. It was the tenth race of the 2007 FIA Formula One World Championship. The 60-lap race was won by Fernando Alonso driving for the McLaren team after starting from second position. Felipe Massa finished second for Ferrari with Mark Webber third in a Red Bull Racing car.

As a consequence of the race, Alonso reduced the World Drivers' Championship lead of his teammate Lewis Hamilton down to two points; in the Constructors' Championship, McLaren extended their lead over Ferrari to twenty-seven points.

== Report ==
=== Background ===
On 29 August 2006 it was announced that the European Grand Prix had been removed from the F1 calendar for the 2007 season. Since then there has only been one GP hosted in Germany each year, alternating between Hockenheimring and Nürburgring. However, the name for this Grand Prix was in doubt. While originally thought to be the German Grand Prix from 2007, the title was later changed to "Großer Preis von Europa" (European Grand Prix), because the Hockenheimring held the naming rights for "German Grand Prix" and they could not reach an agreement to share the naming rights. It was the first time since 1960 that a Formula One World Championship race had not been held under the name "German Grand Prix".

Lewis Hamilton entered the race as Drivers' Championship leader (and due to his 12-point lead over team-mate Fernando Alonso he would keep his championship lead regardless of the race result).

Murray Walker provided radio commentary to listeners in the UK on BBC Radio 5 Live – the first time he had provided UK coverage of an F1 event since retiring in 2001.

Christijan Albers did not drive for Spyker F1 due to his failure to pay sponsorship money. His replacement was German driver Markus Winkelhock, son of former Formula One driver Manfred Winkelhock. This was the last race for Toro Rosso driver Scott Speed who was later replaced by BMW Sauber test driver Sebastian Vettel.

During the weeks leading up to the race it was announced that McLaren would appear in front of the FIA on 26 July regarding claims they had received information from Ferrari. Lewis Hamilton said he was confident it would go well.

As a tribute to the passengers of TAM Airlines Flight 3054, Felipe Massa had a black stripe on his helmet in memory of the victims. Rubens Barrichello also had stripes on his helmet, and Red Bull drivers David Coulthard and Mark Webber had small Brazilian flags on their helmets in reference to the accident.

=== Qualifying ===
Kimi Räikkönen overtook Felipe Massa during the final minute of qualifying and Fernando Alonso pushed him further down into third. The final session of qualifying was delayed for half an hour when Lewis Hamilton crashed into the barriers due to a wheel gun failure which caused the wheel to not be secured on the car. The wheel rubbed against the car, destroying the wheel and tyre, and sending the car into the wall. His time from the "fuel-burn" phase of Q3 was not good enough to elevate him higher than 10th position. Toyota had a strong qualifying with both drivers making it into the top 10, ending up 8th and 9th. Mark Webber qualified an excellent 6th just in front of Renault's Heikki Kovalainen and behind the two BMWs.

As for the rest of the field, Giancarlo Fisichella endured a miserable session qualifying with a poor 13th, which was incidentally the same place he had qualified for the previous year's race. Red Bull had mistakenly let David Coulthard out too late from the pits in Q1 which led him to be stuck back in 20th place, only ahead of the two Spykers of Adrian Sutil and debutant Markus Winkelhock who had not been expected to do much better.

=== Race ===
The race started dry, but rain was expected, and at the start of the warm-up lap, an imminent downpour was predicted. Markus Winkelhock for Spyker pitted for wet tyres, the only driver to do so, starting the race from the pit lane as a result. The Ferraris led into the first corner as a pair with Alonso trailing in third. Lewis Hamilton, meanwhile, coming back from his 10th-place qualifying, was up to sixth at the first corner, but after a collision between the two BMWs, Hamilton received a puncture, causing him to fall back into the rest of the pack.

During the first lap it started to rain, sooner and more heavily than most teams had expected. A number of drivers lost control, and many pitted at the end of the lap to change into intermediate-weather tyres. Leader Kimi Räikkönen attempted to pit, but lost grip and ran wide, having to do an extra lap on dry tyres and dropping to seventh place. Winkelhock thus found himself in the lead as a result of his early gamble, the first time that a Spyker had led a Grand Prix.

Some drivers had stayed out in the hope that the rain would stop, but it worsened, such that full wet tyres were required, rather than intermediates. Winkelhock had a huge advantage as the only driver on the right tyres, and led the race by 33 seconds ahead of Felipe Massa and Fernando Alonso, who had pitted at the end of lap one along with other drivers. By the start of lap three, the weather had become so bad that water was flowing round turn 1 and was nicknamed the 'turn 1 river'.

Jenson Button had moved up from a mid-grid position to 4th despite coming in on the 1st lap to change tyres. However, he spun off into the wall at the start of the 3rd lap, quickly followed by Lewis Hamilton who locked up. Adrian Sutil had a huge spin into the same place as Button and Hamilton and just missed both of them as he hit the wall. Nico Rosberg and Scott Speed also went off at turn 1. Anthony Davidson then locked up at the "river" but stopped his car just before the gravel and was able to reverse out. The safety car was brought out, just as Vitantonio Liuzzi spun off at high speed. The gravel trap slowed him and he gently tapped a recovery tractor. Hamilton had kept his engine running after his spin and was hoisted back on the circuit to continue a lap down. Not long after the safety car was deployed, race director Charlie Whiting decided the conditions were too dangerous to continue, and the race was red flagged. It was the first race to be stopped since the 2003 Brazilian Grand Prix, when a crash by Fernando Alonso halted the race, and the first race to be red-flagged and then restarted since the 2001 Belgian Grand Prix.

At about 2:20 p.m. local time the rain stopped and the drivers were pushed on to the starting grid, in the order that they were one lap before the red flag. Jenson Button, Adrian Sutil, Nico Rosberg, Scott Speed and Vitantonio Liuzzi did not take the restart as they all aquaplaned off the track at turn one on lap three, causing the red flag.

The race restarted under safety car conditions, with an agreement that after one and a half minutes, any lapped cars would be allowed to overtake all the cars in front (including the safety car) and unlap themselves. The only lapped car was that of Lewis Hamilton, who unlapped himself and then pitted to change to dry tyres, a gamble which did not pay off due to the track still being too wet. When the safety car returned to the pit, race leader Markus Winkelhock lost the lead very early on after another gamble, keeping wet weather tyres on while everybody else was on the more suitable intermediate tyre, in the hope that further rain would fall. It would not and eventually he was forced into retirement after a hydraulic failure on lap 15. Winkelhock had only driven the Spyker for a total of three days before the race, and had not previously experienced wet weather in a Formula One car. Takuma Sato and Ralf Schumacher also retired, Schumacher after a collision with Nick Heidfeld who continued. Pole position holder Kimi Räikkönen also retired due to mechanical problems while catching up to the leaders running third.

From then onwards, the track dried out, and the faster Ferrari of Massa led Fernando Alonso. Mark Webber was in third with Alexander Wurz chasing him hard. But on lap 52, more rain fell, and all drivers except for Lewis Hamilton pitted for intermediate tyres. Hamilton managed to get up to a points position of eighth, before eventually having to pit, dropping him back down to tenth. Fernando Alonso's McLaren performed well in the conditions, and he passed Massa on lap 56 around the outside at turn five, making contact as he did so. He proceeded to win the race, taking McLaren's first win at the Nürburgring since 1998, on the 80th anniversary of the first Grand Prix at the Nürburgring. Massa trailed him by 8.1 seconds. The final podium position was claimed by Mark Webber in the Red Bull, over a minute behind the leader. Alexander Wurz, David Coulthard, Nick Heidfeld, Robert Kubica and Heikki Kovalainen, who had gambled on putting intermediate tyres on early and fell from fifth position to eighth, completed the points positions. Red Bull earned ten points to move past Toyota in the Constructors' Championship into sixth. Hamilton finished the race in ninth place, the first time in his debut season that he had finished outside the points-scoring positions. Alonso and Massa had a heated argument in Italian before the podium ceremony, over their collision in the final part of the race.

== Classification ==
=== Qualifying ===
Pos.	No.	Driver	Constructor	Q1	Q2	Q3	Grid
1	6	(Finland) Kimi Räikkönen	Ferrari	1:31.522	1:31.237	1:31.450	1
2	1	(Spain) Fernando Alonso	McLaren-Mercedes	1:31.074	1:30.983	1:31.741	2
3	5	(Brazil) Felipe Massa	Ferrari	1:31.447	1:30.912	1:31.778	3
4	9	(Germany) Nick Heidfeld	BMW Sauber	1:31.889	1:31.652	1:31.840	4
5	10	(Poland) Robert Kubica	BMW Sauber	1:31.961	1:31.444	1:32.123	5
6	15	(Australia) Mark Webber	Red Bull-Renault	1:32.629	1:31.661	1:32.476	6
7	4	(Finland) Heikki Kovalainen	Renault	1:32.594	1:31.783	1:32.478	7
8	12	(Italy) Jarno Trulli	Toyota	1:32.381	1:31.859	1:32.501	8
9	11	(Germany) Ralf Schumacher	Toyota	1:32.446	1:31.843	1:32.570	9
10	2	(United Kingdom) Lewis Hamilton	McLaren-Mercedes	1:31.587	1:31.185	1:33.833	10
11	16	(Germany) Nico Rosberg	Williams-Toyota	1:32.117	1:31.978		11
12	17	(Austria) Alexander Wurz	Williams-Toyota	1:32.173	1:31.996		12
13	3	(Italy) Giancarlo Fisichella	Renault	1:32.378	1:32.010		13
14	8	(Brazil) Rubens Barrichello	Honda	1:32.674	1:32.221		14
15	23	(United Kingdom) Anthony Davidson	Super Aguri-Honda	1:32.793	1:32.451		15
16	22	(Japan) Takuma Sato	Super Aguri-Honda	1:32.678	1:32.838		16
17	7	(United Kingdom) Jenson Button	Honda	1:32.983			17
18	19	(United States) Scott Speed	Toro Rosso-Ferrari	1:33.038			18
19	18	(Italy) Vitantonio Liuzzi	Toro Rosso-Ferrari	1:33.148			19
20	14	(United Kingdom) David Coulthard	Red Bull-Renault	1:33.151			20
21	20	(Germany) Adrian Sutil	Spyker-Ferrari	1:34.500			21
22	21	(Germany) Markus Winkelhock	Spyker-Ferrari	1:35.940			22

=== Race ===
Pos.	No.	Driver	Constructor	Laps	Time/Retired	Grid	Points
1	1	(Spain) Fernando Alonso	McLaren-Mercedes	60	2:06:26.358	2	10
2	5	(Brazil) Felipe Massa	Ferrari	60	+8.155	3	8
3	15	(Australia) Mark Webber	Red Bull-Renault	60	+1:05.674	6	6
4	17	(Austria) Alexander Wurz	Williams-Toyota	60	+1:05.937	12	5
5	14	(United Kingdom) David Coulthard	Red Bull-Renault	60	+1:13.656	20	4
6	9	(Germany) Nick Heidfeld	BMW Sauber	60	+1:20.298	4	3
7	10	(Poland) Robert Kubica	BMW Sauber	60	+1:22.415	5	2
8	4	(Finland) Heikki Kovalainen	Renault	59	+1 lap	7	1
9	2	(United Kingdom) Lewis Hamilton	McLaren-Mercedes	59	+1 lap	10	
10	3	(Italy) Giancarlo Fisichella	Renault	59	+1 lap	13	
11	8	(Brazil) Rubens Barrichello	Honda	59	+1 lap	14	
12	23	(United Kingdom) Anthony Davidson	Super Aguri-Honda	59	+1 lap	15	
13	12	(Italy) Jarno Trulli	Toyota	59	+1 lap	8	
Ret	6	(Finland) Kimi Räikkönen	Ferrari	34	Hydraulics	1	
Ret	22	(Japan) Takuma Sato	Super Aguri-Honda	19	Hydraulics	16	
Ret	11	(Germany) Ralf Schumacher	Toyota	18	Collision	9	
Ret	21	(Germany) Markus Winkelhock	Spyker-Ferrari	13	Hydraulics	PL^{1}	
Ret	7	(United Kingdom) Jenson Button	Honda	2	Spun off	17	
Ret	20	(Germany) Adrian Sutil	Spyker-Ferrari	2	Spun off	21	
Ret	16	(Germany) Nico Rosberg	Williams-Toyota	2	Spun off	11	
Ret	19	(United States) Scott Speed	Toro Rosso-Ferrari	2	Spun off	18	
Ret	18	(Italy) Vitantonio Liuzzi	Toro Rosso-Ferrari	2	Spun off	19	

Notes

- ^1 – Markus Winkelhock started the race from the pitlane.

== Championship standings after the race ==
Drivers' Championship standings

+/–	Pos.	Driver	Points
	1	(United Kingdom) Lewis Hamilton	70
	2	(Spain) Fernando Alonso	68
1	3	(Brazil) Felipe Massa	59
1	4	(Finland) Kimi Räikkönen	52
	5	(Germany) Nick Heidfeld	36

Constructors' Championship standings

+/–	Pos.	Driver	Points
	1	(United Kingdom) McLaren-Mercedes	138
	2	(Italy) Ferrari	111
	3	(Germany) BMW Sauber	61
	4	(France) Renault	32
	5	(United Kingdom) Williams-Toyota	18

- Note: Only the top five positions are included for both sets of standings.

== See also ==
- 2007 Nürburgring GP2 Series round

Previous race: 2007 British Grand Prix	FIA Formula One World Championship; 2007 season	Next race: 2007 Hungarian Grand Prix
Previous race: 2006 European Grand Prix	European Grand Prix	Next race: 2008 European Grand Prix; Next race at the Nürburgring: 2009 German Grand Prix
