= 2020 Turkish Grand Prix =

2020 Formula One race at Istanbul Park

Race 14 of 17 (Note: The outbreak of the COVID-19 pandemic saw several Grands Prix cancelled or rescheduled. The revised calendar consisted of seventeen races.) in the 2020 Formula One World Championship
← Previous race	Next race →
- Layout of the Istanbul Park Circuit

Race details
- Date: 15 November 2020
- Official name: Formula 1 DHL Turkish Grand Prix 2020
- Location: Istanbul Park; Tuzla, Turkey
- Course: Permanent racing facility
- Course length: 5.338 km (3.316 miles)
- Distance: 58 laps, 309.396 km (192.249 miles)
- Weather: Overcast. Wet and drying track. Air: 11–14 °C (52–57 °F); Track: 14–17 °C (57–63 °F)
- Attendance: 0 (Note: The Grand Prix was held behind closed doors due to the COVID-19 pandemic in Turkey.)

Pole position
Driver	(Canada) Lance Stroll	Racing Point-BWT Mercedes
- Time: 1:47.765

Fastest lap
Driver	(United Kingdom) Lando Norris	McLaren-Renault
- Time: 1:36.806 on lap 58

Podium
First	(United Kingdom) Lewis Hamilton	Mercedes
Second	(Mexico) Sergio Pérez	Racing Point-BWT Mercedes
Third	(Germany) Sebastian Vettel	Ferrari

The 2020 Turkish Grand Prix (officially known as the Formula 1 DHL Turkish Grand Prix 2020) was a Formula One motor race held on 15 November 2020 at Istanbul Park in Tuzla, Istanbul. It was the fourteenth round of the 2020 Formula One World Championship, and the eighth Turkish Grand Prix. The event was added to the revised 2020 calendar after other races were cancelled because of the COVID-19 pandemic.

The 58-lap race had low-grip conditions due to a smooth new track surface and rainfall before the start. Racing Point driver Lance Stroll took the first pole position of his career and led most of the race, but finished ninth after his car was damaged. Lewis Hamilton won for the Mercedes team, having started in sixth place. Stroll's teammate Sergio Pérez finished second and Scuderia Ferrari driver Sebastian Vettel came third, with both Pérez and Vettel getting their first podium finishes of the season.

Going into the race only Hamilton and his teammate Valtteri Bottas remained in contention for the World Drivers' Championship, with Hamilton holding an 85-point lead. By winning the race, Hamilton claimed his seventh World Championship title, equalling the record set by Michael Schumacher. Hamilton's title also marked the seventh consecutive time that a Mercedes driver had won the World Championship.

== Background ==
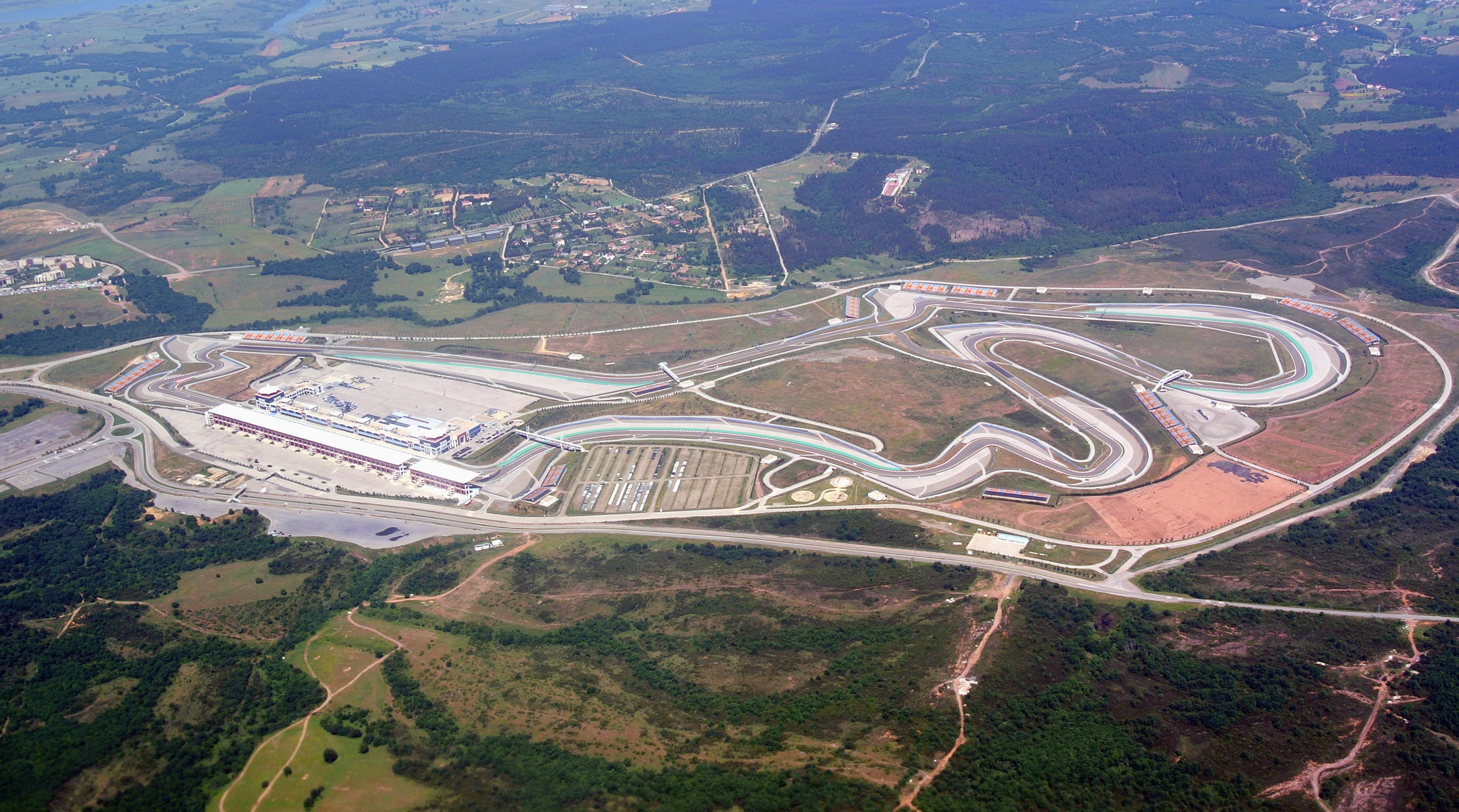
Istanbul Park, where the Grand Prix took place, viewed from the air.

The meeting, officially called the Formula 1 DHL Turkish Grand Prix 2020, took place over the weekend of 13–15 November at the Istanbul Park circuit, and was the fourteenth of the seventeen rounds of the 2020 Formula One World Championship. It was the eighth Turkish Grand Prix held since the inaugural running of the event during the 2005 season, and the first since the 2011 season. The race had not previously taken place in the autumn. No undercard races were held. The event was privately funded.

The 2020 season was heavily affected by the COVID-19 pandemic. Most of the originally planned Grands Prix were cancelled or postponed, prompting the sport's governing body, the FIA, to collaborate with stakeholders on drafting a new calendar. The Turkish Grand Prix was added to the schedule in late August. It was held on the same date that the cancelled Brazilian Grand Prix was previously due to take place on. Initially, it was planned that as many as 100,000 spectators could attend. (Note: At the 2009 Turkish Grand Prix there were 36,000 spectators in attendance.) However, due to a surge of COVID-19 cases in the country, organisers announced that it would take place behind closed doors.

The venue is located in Tuzla, Istanbul, at the outskirts of the city on the Asian side of the Bosporus Strait. It was the first Grand Prix of the year to take place outside of Europe. (Note: The 2020 New Zealand Grand Prix, held in February, was not a Formula One race.) The race took place two weeks after the previous round in Italy and a fortnight before the following round in Bahrain. While teams had driven their cargo to previous editions, the plan for the 2020 meeting was to fly it to Turkey.

A lap of the fourteen-turn circuit measures 5.338 kilometres (3.317 mi). The lap record was set in 2005 by Juan Pablo Montoya with a time of one minute and 24.770 seconds at an average of 226.693 kilometres per hour (140.860 mph). A second drag reduction system (DRS) zone was added on the straight between the final and first turns, with the goal of aiding overtaking. The detection point was established after turn thirteen. During the 2011 Turkish Grand Prix, only the DRS zone located between turns eleven and twelve was used.

The venue, which had not hosted a major racing event for several years, (Note: The World Rallycross Championship last raced on a heavily truncated layout in 2015, while the Superbike World Championship last raced on the full course in 2013.) was renovated in the lead up to the race. Barriers and kerbs were upgraded, and the track was resurfaced. Tilke Engineers & Architects oversaw the resurfacing. The organisers of the Grand Prix hoped that it would lead to future events being scheduled for the venue, although they would not want to hold them during Ramadan. (Note: In April 2021 it was announced that the event would replace that year's Canadian Grand Prix. It was cancelled in May 2021 because of travel restrictions related to the COVID-19 pandemic. In June 2021 it was announced that the event would replace the cancelled Singapore Grand Prix in October 2021.) While the event was popular with competitors and television audiences, low in-person attendance and the high cost of hosting the race were responsible for its absence from the previous eight seasons.

Ten teams (each representing a different constructor) each entered two drivers. The drivers and teams were the same as those on the season entry list, with no additional stand-in drivers for either the race or practice. Scuderia Ferrari team principal Mattia Binotto did not attend as he tested the feasibility of managing the team remotely. The Alfa Romeo team's participation marked the 500th Grand Prix entry by a team run by the Sauber Motorsport company. It was also Red Bull Racing's 300th Grand Prix entry as a constructor. Three drivers who had won previous editions were entered (Kimi Räikkönen, Lewis Hamilton, and Sebastian Vettel).

Social distancing measures were put in place and workers were obliged to always wear masks. The Williams team made personnel changes after several workers either tested positive for SARS-CoV-2 or showed possible symptoms of COVID-19, with 24 workers who usually remain at the factory substituting for their absent colleagues at the Grand Prix. Acting team principal Simon Roberts did not attend after testing positive for the coronavirus. Mario Isola, the head of Pirelli's Formula One tyre programme, tested positive for the coronavirus on the day of the race and went into self-isolation. Three other workers tested positive for the coronavirus over the course of the week the race took place.

=== Tyres ===
Sole Formula One tyre manufacturer Pirelli brought their three hardest dry-weather tyre compounds – the C1, C2, and C3. Two types of wet-weather tyre, known as "wets" and "intermediates", were also available. Following Friday's practice sessions, Isola said that Pirelli had not been aware of the resurfacing which had been done to the track two weeks prior, and that if they had known, they would have brought softer tyre compounds which would suit the smoother surface better. Pirelli had noted the increased forces that tyres were subject to as the cars became faster over the course of the season.

The lower than expected levels of friction between the tyres and the tarmac meant that drivers consistently struggled to maintain the tyre temperature needed for the tyres to operate efficiently, limiting the speeds that could be achieved. Tyres being at the correct temperature could allow a driver to complete a lap more than five seconds quicker than if the tyres were too hot or cold. The tarmac evolved slowly over the weekend because no supporting events were held where rubber could be laid down, which can improve adhesion.

=== Championship permutations ===
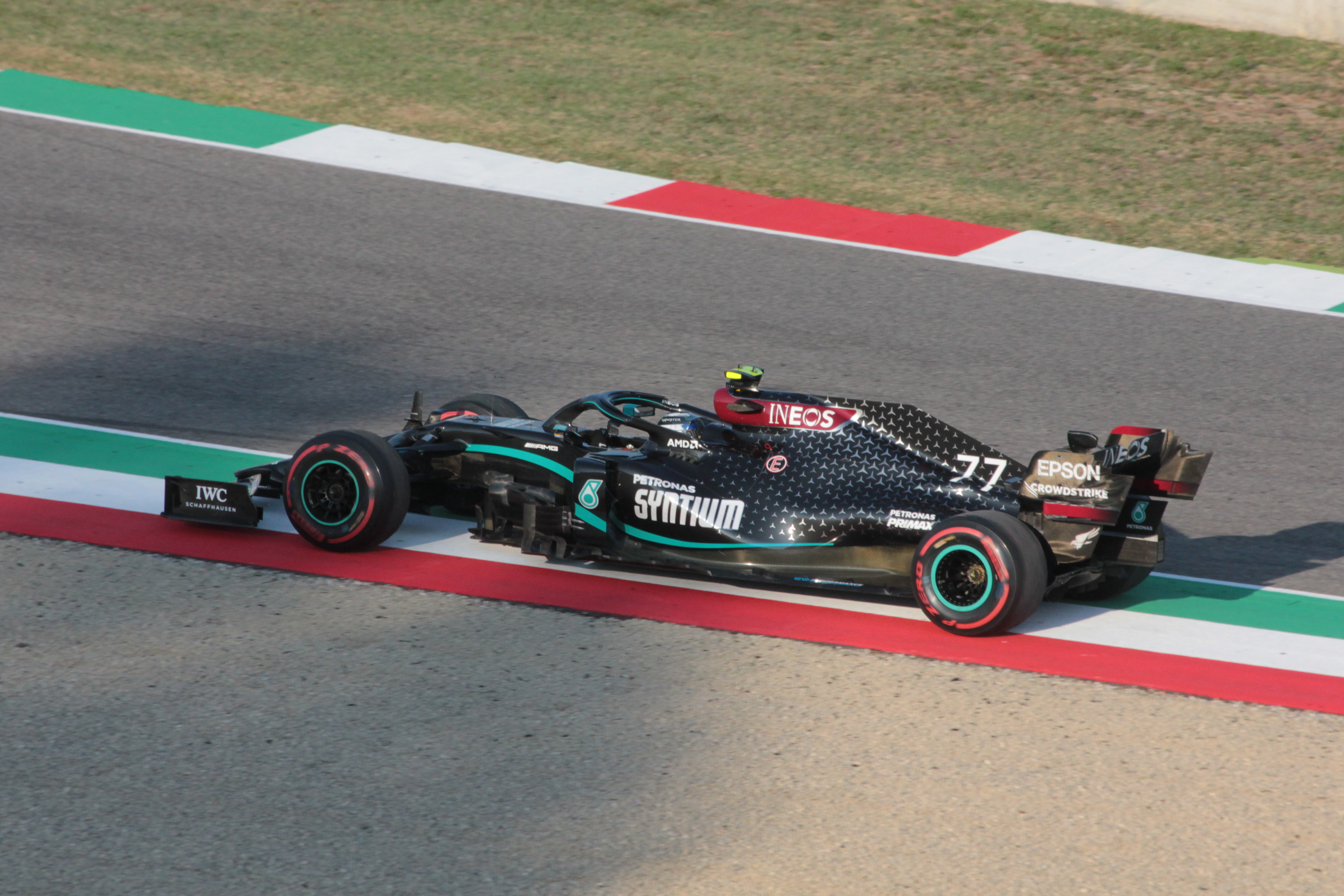
Mercedes were the only team whose drivers could still win the World Drivers' Championship, with their W11 car being the fastest for most of the season.

The Mercedes team had already secured both championships, as no other team's drivers could outscore Hamilton, who held an 85-point lead over his teammate Valtteri Bottas with a maximum of 104 points still available. Bottas needed to score eight points more than Hamilton in order to remain in contention to win the 2020 World Drivers' Championship. If Bottas finished in a position lower than sixth, then Hamilton would win the championship regardless of where he finished. If Hamilton finished in second place then Bottas would have needed to have won and set the fastest lap of the race in order to remain in contention. This was Hamilton's first opportunity to secure the 2020 title. Only one point separated the Renault team in third from fifth-placed Racing Point in the Constructors' Championship standings, with McLaren in fourth.

== Practice ==
The first of Friday's two ninety-minute practice sessions ended with Max Verstappen fastest ahead of Red Bull teammate Alex Albon, with Charles Leclerc third fastest for Ferrari. The session was briefly suspended after Leclerc hit a bollard during its opening minutes. Championship leader Hamilton was only fifteenth fastest while Bottas was ninth. Carlos Sainz Jr. stopped on track as his McLaren broke down.

Several drivers had spins during the first practice session, and all struggled for speed, with drivers stating there was a lack of grip following the track being resurfaced. Bitumen seeping from the fresh tarmac and the cold November weather were amongst the contributing factors. The event organisers washed the track before the session, and the circuit had not finished drying by the start of the session. Lap times in first practice were approximately ten seconds slower that those set at the circuit's previous Grand Prix meeting (Note: Max Verstappen's 1:35.077 was the fastest time in first practice compared to the 1:25.049 pole position time in 2011.) and fifteen to twenty seconds slower that the lap times that were expected in qualifying.

The second Friday practice session ended with Verstappen fastest ahead of Leclerc and Bottas. Verstappen's best time in the second session was nearly seven seconds faster than in the first. Championship contenders Bottas and Hamilton both improved their positions significantly in this session. Bottas compared the low-grip track conditions to his experiences of driving on ice in his native Finland. Rubber building up on the tarmac contributed to the higher grip levels.

The third and final one hour practice session was held in wet conditions on Saturday morning and ended with Verstappen fastest ahead of Leclerc and Albon, while championship leader Hamilton did not set a time. Several drivers criticised the track conditions during this session. Leclerc had a minor collision with Renault driver Esteban Ocon, while McLaren driver Lando Norris spun off the circuit.

== Qualifying ==
Qualifying started at 15:00 local time (UTC+03:00) on the Saturday. The air temperature at the start of qualifying was 11.9 °C (53.4 °F) and the track temperature was 13.6 °C (56.5 °F). The session was split into three subsessions. (Note: The subsessions lasted 18, 15, and 12 minutes respectively.) After each subsession the slowest five cars had their qualifying positions set and were prevented from taking part in the next subsession. Lap times were deleted if drivers left the track at the exit of the first, sixth, or fourteenth corners. The session was defined by a low-grip track surface and damp weather, with the first subsession being suspended for 45 minutes as a result.

=== Qualifying report ===
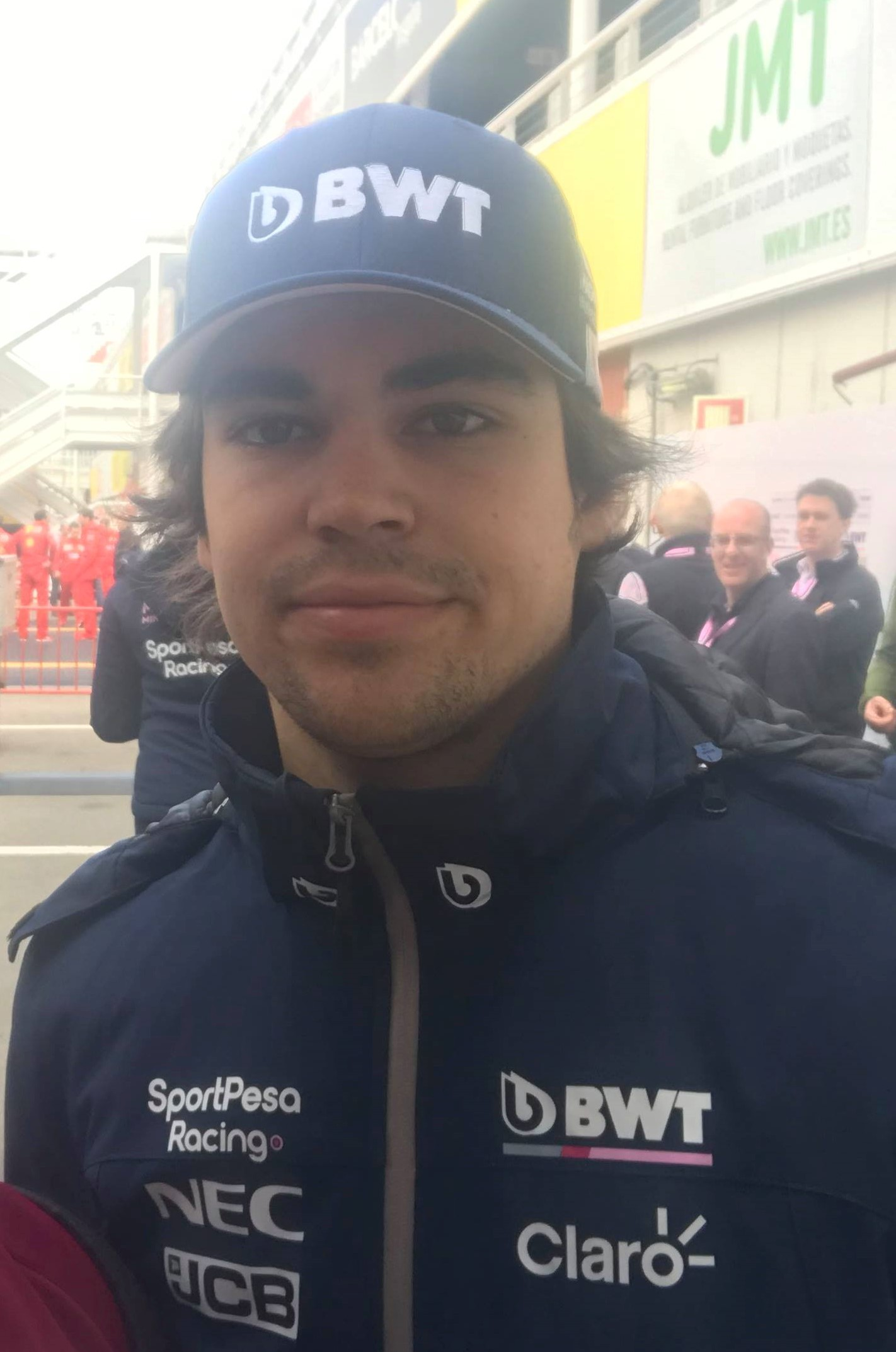
Lance Stroll (pictured at the 2019 pre-season test) took the first pole position of his Formula One career driving for Racing Point.

Racing Point driver Lance Stroll set the fastest time of the final subsession to score the maiden pole position of his career, completing a lap in one minute and 47.765 seconds at an average speed of 178.321 kilometres per hour (110.804 mph). It was the first pole position for a Canadian driver since Jacques Villeneuve's pole at the 1997 European Grand Prix. Stroll credited his experience of driving on ice in Canada as helping him. The team were able to set up their cars to work well in the slippery conditions, with Stroll's teammate Sergio Pérez qualifying in third place after spending most of the final subsession at the top of the time sheets. This was Racing Point's first pole position as a constructor, and it was also the first pole for any incarnation of the team since their predecessors Force India at the 2009 Belgian Grand Prix. Racing Point's pole was the first for a constructor other than Mercedes, Red Bull, or Ferrari since the 2014 Austrian Grand Prix.

Verstappen qualified second for Red Bull after struggling to manage his tyre temperatures. The Red Bull car had performed better on the full wet tyres in the second part of qualifying than on the intermediates in the final subsession, which was the first session of the meeting where Verstappen did not set the fastest lap time. He qualified 0.3 seconds behind Stroll, having lost 0.6 seconds to an error at the seventh turn. Albon in the other Red Bull equalled his best qualifying result with fourth position; he set his fastest time on the full wet tyres.

Constructors' champions Mercedes had a poor session, with Hamilton qualifying in sixth place and Bottas in ninth; this was the first pole position in 2020 not to go to a Mercedes driver. Both drivers felt that they were less able to utilise the grip of the tyres than some other teams. Hamilton came close to not making it out of the first subsession, with a fastest time in that segment over ten seconds slower than the time set by Verstappen. The Mercedes car took as many as seven laps to get its tyres up to temperature in the prevailing conditions, which the short qualifying subsessions rendered unfeasible.

Two other teams saw their drivers progress to the final part of qualifying. The Renaults of Ocon and Daniel Ricciardo appeared to be stronger on the full wet tyres than the intermediates. Ricciardo qualified in fifth after spending the whole session on the full wets, while Ocon qualified seventh after struggling on the intermediates. Ocon changed back to full wet tyres towards the end of the final segment, but only had enough time for a single lap and could not build up tyre temperature quickly enough. The Alfa Romeo team had their best qualifying of the season with Räikkönen eighth and Antonio Giovinazzi tenth. It was the first time both Alfa Romeo drivers qualified in the top ten that year.

McLaren had their worst qualifying of the year so far, with neither of their drivers qualifying in the top ten. Norris qualified eleventh and Sainz thirteenth as they were unable to get their car's tyres up to the needed temperature. Despite being second fastest in final practice, Leclerc could only qualify fourteenth, being knocked out in the second subsession with a lap time six seconds slower than pacesetter Verstappen. Vettel outqualified him in the other Ferrari, claiming twelfth position. Vettel had not outqualified Leclerc at any of the previous ten Grands Prix. AlphaTauri driver Pierre Gasly qualified fifteenth with a lap time over eight seconds slower than Verstappen's in the second part, and said that "we got lucky to get out of Q1".

The first part of qualifying was suspended a second time when the Haas of Romain Grosjean went off the circuit. This compromised his teammate Kevin Magnussen's qualifying result, as he could not set a fast enough time after the session resumed to make it through to the second part. Magnussen qualified sixteenth, having had to slow down after the AlphaTauri of Daniil Kvyat spun on the track ahead of him. Kvyat also failed to progress past the end of the first subsession, qualifying seventeenth. The Williams drivers could not maintain the necessary tyre temperature, with the resultant lack of grip leaving George Russell a long way off the pace, qualifying eighteenth. Nicholas Latifi lost control of his car, which then got beached in a gravel trap.

=== Post-qualifying ===
Stroll was investigated for failing to slow for yellow flags (which were warning that his teammate had spun on track ahead of him) in the third part of qualifying. However, he was cleared of any wrongdoing as he was deemed to have slowed sufficiently for the incident, with the drying track surface leading to Stroll's improved lap time. Norris and Russell were penalised and had to start the race from five places further back as a result. This was because they failed to slow down enough under yellow flag conditions during the first part of qualifying. Sainz was also given a similar three-place grid penalty for impeding Pérez in the first part of qualifying.

A review was launched after the second segment of qualifying was started whilst race marshals were still using a tractor crane to recover the car of Latifi, who had spun off in the previous subsession. This caused concern with some drivers citing the 2014 Japanese Grand Prix, during which Jules Bianchi had a fatal collision with a recovery vehicle.

=== Qualifying classification ===
Pos.	No.	Driver	Constructor	Qualifying times			Final grid
Pos.	No.	Driver	Constructor	Q1	Q2	Q3	Final grid
1	18	(Canada) Lance Stroll	Racing Point-BWT Mercedes	2:07.467	1:53.372	1:47.765	1
2	33	(Netherlands) Max Verstappen	Red Bull Racing-Honda	1:57.485	1:50.293	1:48.055	2
3	11	(Mexico) Sergio Pérez	Racing Point-BWT Mercedes	2:07.614	1:54.097	1:49.321	3
4	23	(Thailand) Alexander Albon	Red Bull Racing-Honda	1:59.431	1:52.282	1:50.448	4
5	3	(Australia) Daniel Ricciardo	Renault	2:05.598	1:54.278	1:51.595	5
6	44	(United Kingdom) Lewis Hamilton	Mercedes	2:07.559	1:52.709	1:52.560	6
7	31	(France) Esteban Ocon	Renault	2:06.115	1:53.657	1:52.622	7
8	7	(Finland) Kimi Räikkönen	Alfa Romeo Racing-Ferrari	2:01.249	1:53.793	1:52.745	8
9	77	(Finland) Valtteri Bottas	Mercedes	2:07.001	1:53.767	1:53.258	9
10	99	(Italy) Antonio Giovinazzi	Alfa Romeo Racing-Ferrari	2:07.341	1:53.431	1:57.226	10
11	4	(United Kingdom) Lando Norris	McLaren-Renault	2:07.167	1:54.945	N/A	14 (Note: Lando Norris received a five-place grid penalty for failing to respect yellow flags during qualifying.)
12	5	(Germany) Sebastian Vettel	Ferrari	2:03.356	1:55.169	N/A	11
13	55	(Spain) Carlos Sainz Jr.	McLaren-Renault	2:07.489	1:55.410	N/A	15 (Note: Carlos Sainz Jr. received a three-place grid penalty for impeding Sergio Pérez during qualifying.)
14	16	(Monaco) Charles Leclerc	Ferrari	2:04.464	1:56.696	N/A	12
15	10	(France) Pierre Gasly	AlphaTauri-Honda	2:05.579	1:58.556	N/A	19 (Note: Pierre Gasly was required to start from the back of the grid for breaching parc fermé regulations.)
16	20	(Denmark) Kevin Magnussen	Haas-Ferrari	2:08.007	N/A	N/A	13
17	26	(Russia) Daniil Kvyat	AlphaTauri-Honda	2:09.070	N/A	N/A	16
18	63	(United Kingdom) George Russell	Williams-Mercedes	2:10.017	N/A	N/A	PL (Note: George Russell was required to start from the back of the grid for exceeding his quota of power unit elements. He also received a five-place grid penalty for failing to respect yellow flags during qualifying. Russell started the race from the pit lane after he had to return to the pits to fix his damaged car. His place on the grid, 20th, was left vacant.)
19	8	(France) Romain Grosjean	Haas-Ferrari	2:12.909	N/A	N/A	17
20	6	(Canada) Nicholas Latifi	Williams-Mercedes	2:21.611	N/A	N/A	PL (Note: Nicholas Latifi started the race from the pit lane as he did not leave it before it was closed. His place on the grid, 18th, was left vacant.)
107% time: 2:05.708 (Note: As qualifying was held on a wet track, the 107% rule was not enforced.)

== Race ==
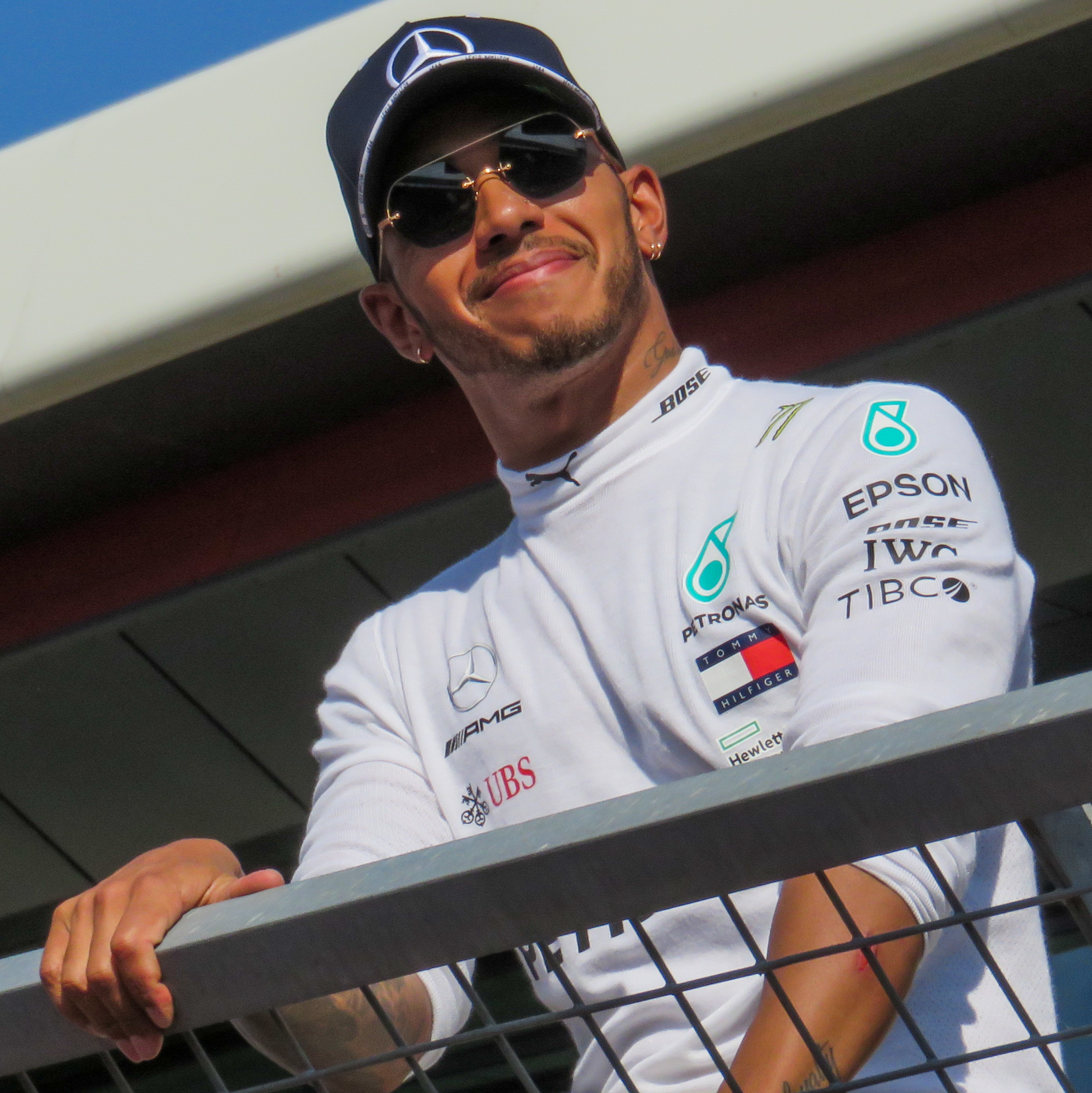
Lewis Hamilton (pictured in 2018) won the race and in doing so, the World Drivers' Championship.

The race was held on the Sunday with a distance of 58 laps (Note: The fewest laps to exceed 305 kilometres (190 mi).) and a scheduled start time of 13:10 local time (UTC+03:00). The air temperature shortly before the start was 12.2 °C (54.0 °F) and the track temperature was 15 °C (59 °F). Rainfall half an hour beforehand meant the track was very wet at the start of the race. Gasly was required to start from the rear because the AlphaTauri mechanics had performed work on his car while it was in parc fermé. The Red Bull team erroneously fitted Verstappen's car with an asymmetrical front wing, which compromised his race. Giovinazzi spun on a reconnaissance lap, breaking the front wing of his Alfa Romeo. Russell had a similar incident in his Williams, and started the race from the pit lane. His teammate Latifi also started from the pits, with Williams being the only team to start their drivers on intermediate wet tyres rather than full wet tyres.

=== Race report ===
==== Race start and opening lap ====
Stroll held onto the lead after starting from pole position, while his teammate Pérez moved up from third place into second. This was the first time Stroll had led a lap of a world championship Grand Prix. Both Red Bull drivers accelerated slowly from the standing start, and were overtaken by other drivers who started behind them, with Verstappen falling from second to eighth place at the start. Much of the grid chose to launch in second gear, but the drivers of the two Honda powered teams (Red Bull and AlphaTauri) all chose to start in first gear.

Ocon and Ricciardo made contact at the first turn, which caused Ocon to spin. Bottas also spun while avoiding a collision with Ocon. Ricciardo apologised to his teammate for the encounter, although Ocon did not think the contact was Ricciardo's fault. Hamilton squeezed past this incident to move into third place. Another incident involving Bottas and Ocon later on the first lap left Ocon with a punctured tyre, and Bottas with steering damage for the rest of the race.

Vettel gained a large number of places on the first lap, moving into fourth place after starting eleventh. Vettel overtook Hamilton to gain third place when the Mercedes driver slid off at the ninth turn. Hamilton rejoined the track in the same sixth position he had started in. Sainz moved up from fifteenth into ninth on the first lap while his McLaren teammate Norris was slow off the line. Starting from an even numbered grid position was seen as a disadvantage due to the lower grip levels on that side of the track.

==== Early stages ====
Leclerc, who was in fourteenth place at the time, made a pit stop to switch from full wet tyres to intermediates on lap six, with the frontrunning drivers doing the same over the following laps. The Ferrari driver's speed on the new tyres convinced other teams to change the tyres on their cars. Hamilton and Vettel made their pit stops on lap eight, while Stroll pitted on lap nine and Pérez on lap ten. A slow pit stop for Pérez allowed Stroll to extend his advantage to ten seconds. Verstappen, who had been unable to pass Vettel, waited until lap eleven to switch from the full wets to the intermediates. This allowed Verstappen to emerge from the pit lane ahead of the Ferrari driver. Albon led a Grand Prix for the first time before he took a pit stop for intermediate tyres on lap twelve.

There was one virtual safety car period during the race. This occurred after Giovinazzi retired with gearbox issues on the twelfth lap. Other drivers were required to slow down while his Alfa Romeo was recovered. Albon had lost a position to Hamilton during the first pit stop cycle, but was able to overtake him once drivers were allowed to return to racing speed as his Red Bull's tyres came up to temperature quicker than those of Hamilton's Mercedes. Albon moved up another position on the sixteenth lap when he overtook Vettel.

The Red Bull and Racing Point cars were the fastest on the track in the earlier stages of the race, with Verstappen and Albon catching up to Pérez and Stroll ahead of them. Verstappen spun at high speed on lap eighteen while trying to pass Pérez. This damaged the Red Bull's tyres, meaning that he had to pit again. This allowed Albon, Vettel, and Hamilton to pass Verstappen. Albon then began to catch Pérez, only to fall back as his tyres wore out.

==== Middle stages ====
Some teams hoped that it would be possible to switch onto dry weather tyres, but as the race progressed this was ruled out. At the end of the 30th lap Ferrari brought Leclerc into the pits to change onto a second set of intermediate tyres. Leclerc's pace on the new tyres encouraged others to also stop. Sainz moved up into sixth place after Ricciardo spun on the 32nd lap. Ricciardo pitted for new intermediates at the end of that lap, with Sainz and Vettel doing the same a lap later. Vettel's pit stop lasted five seconds, slow by modern Formula One standards. Tyre wear caused Albon to spin on the 34th lap, which allowed Vettel and Hamilton to overtake him. Albon came into the pits at the end of that lap, then struggled to find grip on his second set of intermediate tyres.

Stroll led for all but three of the first 35 laps, briefly relinquishing it during the first pit stop cycle before regaining it as other drivers came in for their first pit stops. He lost the lead on lap 36 when the team brought him into the pits for a new set of intermediate tyres. After this he fell to ninth place by the end of the race. According to the Racing Point team, this was due to damage to his car's front wing that caused a loss of aerodynamic downforce, which in turn damaged the tyres. Stroll had told his engineer before the pit stop that he did not want to change tyres. Norris also pitted on the 36th lap.

Pérez briefly led after Stroll's pit stop, but Hamilton overtook him a lap later using the drag reduction system, which had been enabled on lap 30. Hamilton caught up to Pérez after Vettel (who Hamilton had been unable to overtake on track) made his second pit stop. As Stroll struggled on the new set of tyres the team decided against replacing the tyres on Pérez's car. Leclerc followed Vettel past Stroll after the Racing Point driver made an error on the 39th lap, before using the drag reduction system to overtake his Ferrari teammate on the next lap. Leclerc was in ninth place before his pit stop, but was in third by the end of the 43rd lap.

==== Closing stages and race finish ====
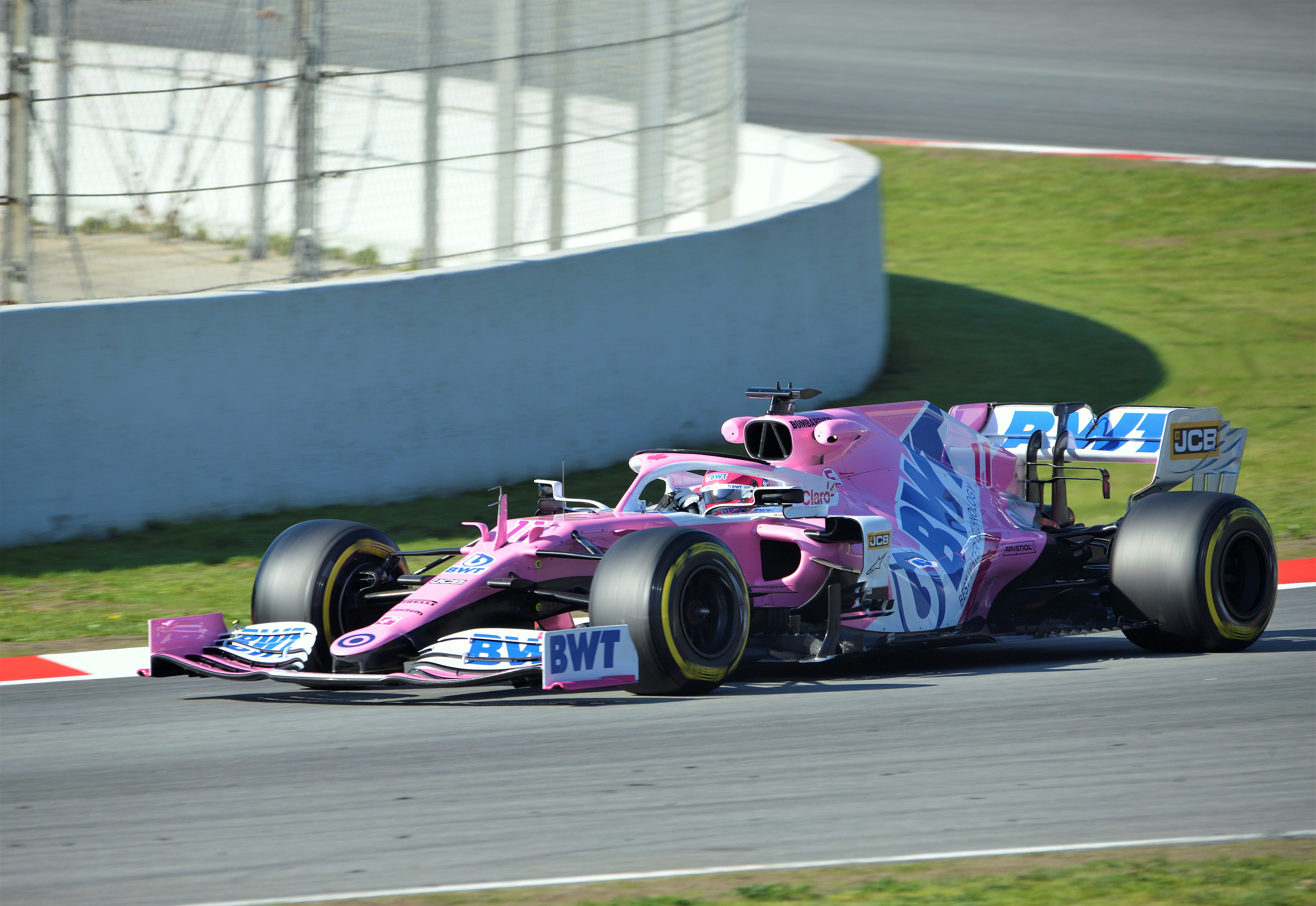
Sergio Pérez's second-place finish helped Racing Point move from fifth to third in the Constructors' Championship standings.

Hamilton went on to win the race from Pérez by a margin of half a minute, having completed the 309.396 kilometres (192.250 mi) in one hour, 42 minutes, and 19.313 seconds at an average of 181.425 kilometres per hour (112.732 mph). On the final lap Leclerc attempted to pass Pérez for second place, but made an error and was passed by Vettel. Leclerc said his inability to see behind him due to dirt on his wing mirrors contributed to his mistake. This was the second time Hamilton had won the event; the first was the 2010 Turkish Grand Prix. It was his 94th Grand Prix victory, and his tenth of 2020. This was Vettel's only podium in 2020, and Pérez's best result since the 2012 Italian Grand Prix.

Hamilton and Pérez had continued without stopping again on heavily worn intermediate tyres. Pérez said his tyres were close to failing at the end. The Mexican driver had used the same set of tyres for 48 laps, while Hamilton had used his for 50 laps. Hamilton chose against changing his tyres as he did not want to repeat what had happened at the 2007 Chinese Grand Prix, where an accident while entering the pit lane on worn tyres in wet conditions cost him the championship. Most of the tread had been worn off of Hamilton's tyres by the finish, leaving them nearly slick. The lack of safety car periods and the slow drying of the track surface allowed Hamilton to manage his tyre wear and temperatures effectively throughout the race.

The rest of the top ten all finished on the lead lap. Sainz passed both Stroll and Albon to finish in fifth place as the latter two both lost time to graining tyres. Verstappen, who finished in sixth place, made a third pit stop on lap 43, after which he was unable to catch Sainz. This proved to be the only race of the season where Verstappen neither retired nor finished on the podium. Albon finished in seventh place, behind his teammate, who had passed him with seven laps remaining. Sainz's teammate Norris overtook Stroll to gain eighth place during the closing stages of the race. Norris also scored the bonus point for fastest lap, which he set on the final lap of the race with a time of one minute and 36.806 seconds at an average speed of 198.508 kilometres per hour (123.347 mph). Ricciardo claimed the final points paying position in tenth after a spin allowed Norris to pass him.

There were six other drivers who were still running at the end of the race, all one lap down. Ocon finished eleventh after dropping to the back on the first lap. The AlphaTauri drivers finished twelfth and thirteenth after a difficult weekend for the team. Hamilton's Mercedes teammate and sole remaining title rival Bottas finished in fourteenth place after spinning six times during the race. Räikkönen dropped to fifteenth at the finish due to a lack of grip from his front tyres. Russell finished in sixteenth after struggling for tyre temperature.

Giovanazzi, Latifi, and Grosjean were the only drivers to retire from the Grand Prix, while Magnussen was classified as finishing despite not completing the race. Latifi and Grosjean both retired in the pits with damage following a collision. Grosjean's teammate Magnussen, who had been running as high as eleventh until he lost two laps to a botched pit stop, withdrew late in the race while experiencing problems with poor visibility.

=== Post-race ===
Hamilton's victory secured him his seventh World Drivers' Championship title, equalling Michael Schumacher's record. This was the seventh consecutive time a Mercedes driver had won the World Drivers' Championship. Verstappen remained in third, but reduced his deficit to second-placed Bottas from 35 to 27 points. The result moved Pérez (who stated before the race that he did not know if he would have a Formula One contract for the 2021 season) up two places into fourth in the championship ahead of Leclerc and Ricciardo.

Racing Point moved up from fifth to third in the Constructors' Championship standings, trading places with Renault and moving ahead of McLaren, who remained in fourth. Ferrari's third- and fourth-placed finishes meant they scored the most points of any constructor at this race, allowing them to regain ground on Racing Point, McLaren, and Renault, and to increase their points advantage over AlphaTauri in the battle for sixth in the Constructor's Championship standings from fourteen to 41 points. AlphaTauri failed to score for the first time in eleven races.

With this track and the new surface here, you see people who are professional ... incredible drivers ... losing control today, that's how slippery and difficult the conditions were. This was a big test for me because ... you know what you normally do in the rain, but this is different, in the sense that this is ice! I don't remember having an ice race before.

— Lewis Hamilton, speaking after the race.

Hamilton, Pérez, and Vettel were joined for the podium ceremony by Mercedes team principal Toto Wolff, who collected the trophy for the winning constructor. The trophies were presented by Mustafa Şentop, the Speaker of the Turkish Parliament. The podium finishers were then interviewed by Martin Brundle. Drivers who did not finish on the podium parked their cars in the pit lane before proceeding to the area where media interviews were conducted.

Following the race, Hamilton said that he wanted his success to inspire children and to help create a more equal world. He also reflected on the significance his status as the only black driver in Formula One, and stated that he hoped to have more races in similarly difficult conditions where he can demonstrate his talents. Several sporting figures praised Hamilton for his abilities and achievements, along with long-time rival Vettel, who said "every era has its driver and Lewis is certainly the greatest of our era." Vettel praised Hamilton's performance in the race, saying "it wasn't his race to win and he still won it." Former Formula One driver Johnny Herbert called Hamilton "one of the greats, if not the greatest" and compared Hamilton's achievements and personality to those of Tiger Woods in golf and Roger Federer in tennis.

Despite losing the title to Hamilton, Bottas congratulated his teammate after the race. Bottas said that the Grand Prix "could be the most difficult race I have ever had in Formula One", but looked forward to having a more relaxed conclusion to the season after the championship was decided. While some commentators were critical of Bottas following his title loss, Hamilton expressed the view that his teammate deserves "due respect" and that "mentally, ... he is one of the strongest drivers". Stroll's performance was praised by commentators, although some felt that he could have handled the situation better as he fell down the order. Damon Hill (the 1996 Formula One world champion) said that Stroll "drove beautifully."

Managing director of Formula One Ross Brawn expressed the view that the slippery conditions during the race allowed more experienced drivers to showcase their talents. With regards to Vettel, Brawn said that the race "reminded us of his deep talents"; he also said that "Pérez put in a great performance". Brawn commented that Hamilton "stayed patient in the race, strategised, and pushed when needed to." The three podium finishers were amongst the older and more experienced drivers in the race. The podium came at a key point for Pérez as he pursued a contract to drive for Red Bull in 2021. Michael Masi, Formula One's race director, noted the unusual circumstances of the race, comparing it to the 2010 Korean Grand Prix. He also praised the race organisers for bringing the disused track back to Formula One standards quickly.

Wolff said that Hamilton was unlikely to retire from Formula One at the end of the season. Wolff commented that Hamilton's performance in the race had likely added to the value of any future Formula One contracts he may have. Calls were made for Hamilton to be knighted by members of the British parliament. Hamilton responded to these calls by saying that he believes war veterans and doctors and nurses are more deserving of such honours. He was knighted the following month as part of the 2021 New Year Honours.

After the season finished Hamilton said that he thought his drive at the race was his best of the year. Some commentators agreed with Hamilton, with Giles Richards writing for The Guardian newspaper comparing his performance to that of Ayrton Senna at the 1993 European Grand Prix. The 2014 GP2 Series champion Jolyon Palmer said in a BBC Sport column that "this was surely one of his best career wins on a weekend when Mercedes were not at their dominant best." Palmer also noted Verstappen's spin as the Red Bull driver's only "major mistake" of the season.

=== Race classification ===
Pos.	No.	Driver	Constructor	Laps	Time/Retired	Grid	Points
1	44	(United Kingdom) Lewis Hamilton	Mercedes	58	1:42:19.313	6	25
2	11	(Mexico) Sergio Pérez	Racing Point-BWT Mercedes	58	+31.633	3	18
3	5	(Germany) Sebastian Vettel	Ferrari	58	+31.960	11	15
4	16	(Monaco) Charles Leclerc	Ferrari	58	+33.858	12	12
5	55	(Spain) Carlos Sainz Jr.	McLaren-Renault	58	+34.363	15	10
6	33	(Netherlands) Max Verstappen	Red Bull Racing-Honda	58	+44.873	2	8
7	23	(Thailand) Alexander Albon	Red Bull Racing-Honda	58	+46.484	4	6
8	4	(United Kingdom) Lando Norris	McLaren-Renault	58	+1:01.259	14	5 (Note: Includes one point for fastest lap.)
9	18	(Canada) Lance Stroll	Racing Point-BWT Mercedes	58	+1:12.353	1	2
10	3	(Australia) Daniel Ricciardo	Renault	58	+1:35.460	5	1
11	31	(France) Esteban Ocon	Renault	57	+1 lap	7	
12	26	(Russia) Daniil Kvyat	AlphaTauri-Honda	57	+1 lap	16	
13	10	(France) Pierre Gasly	AlphaTauri-Honda	57	+1 lap	19	
14	77	(Finland) Valtteri Bottas	Mercedes	57	+1 lap	9	
15	7	(Finland) Kimi Räikkönen	Alfa Romeo Racing-Ferrari	57	+1 lap	8	
16	63	(United Kingdom) George Russell	Williams-Mercedes	57	+1 lap	PL	
17	20	(Denmark) Kevin Magnussen	Haas-Ferrari	55	Withdrew (Note: Kevin Magnussen did not finish, but was classified as he had completed more than 90% of the race distance.)	13	
Ret	8	(France) Romain Grosjean	Haas-Ferrari	49	Collision damage	17	
Ret	6	(Canada) Nicholas Latifi	Williams-Mercedes	39	Collision damage	PL	
Ret	99	(Italy) Antonio Giovinazzi	Alfa Romeo Racing-Ferrari	11	Gearbox	10	
Fastest lap: (United Kingdom) Lando Norris (McLaren-Renault) – 1:36.806 (lap 58)

== Championship standings after the race ==
Drivers' Championship standings

	Pos.	Driver	Points
Unchanged	1	(United Kingdom) **Lewis Hamilton**	307
Unchanged	2	(Finland) Valtteri Bottas	197
Unchanged	3	(Netherlands) Max Verstappen	170
2	4	(Mexico) Sergio Pérez	100
Unchanged	5	(Monaco) Charles Leclerc	97

Constructors' Championship standings

	Pos.	Constructor	Points
Unchanged	1	(Germany) **Mercedes**	504
Unchanged	2	(Austria) Red Bull Racing-Honda	240
2	3	(United Kingdom) Racing Point-BWT Mercedes	154 (Note: Racing Point was deducted 15 points after a protest from Renault was upheld regarding the legality of their car.)
Unchanged	4	(United Kingdom) McLaren-Renault	149
2	5	(France) Renault	136

- Note: Only the top five positions are included for both sets of standings.
- **Bold text** indicates the 2020 World Champions.

== Notes ==
Previous race: 2020 Emilia Romagna Grand Prix	FIA Formula One World Championship; 2020 season	Next race: 2020 Bahrain Grand Prix
Previous race: 2011 Turkish Grand Prix	Turkish Grand Prix	Next race: 2021 Turkish Grand Prix
