= 2021 Turkish Grand Prix =

16th round of the 2021 Formula One season

Race 16 of 22 in the 2021 Formula One World Championship
← Previous race	Next race →
- Layout of the Istanbul Park Circuit

Race details
- Date: 10 October 2021
- Official name: Formula 1 Rolex Turkish Grand Prix 2021
- Location: Istanbul Park, Tuzla, Istanbul
- Course: Permanent racing facility
- Course length: 5.338 km (3.316 miles)
- Distance: 58 laps, 309.396 km (192.249 miles)
- Weather: Overcast with intermittent rain
- Attendance: 190,000

Pole position
Driver	(Finland) Valtteri Bottas (Note: Lewis Hamilton set the fastest time in qualifying, but received a ten-place grid penalty for exceeding his quota of internal combustion engines. Valtteri Bottas was promoted to pole position in his place.)	Mercedes
- Time: 1:22.998

Fastest lap
Driver	(Finland) Valtteri Bottas	Mercedes
- Time: 1:30.432 on lap 58

Podium
First	(Finland) Valtteri Bottas	Mercedes
Second	(Netherlands) Max Verstappen	Red Bull Racing-Honda
Third	(Mexico) Sergio Pérez	Red Bull Racing-Honda

The 2021 Turkish Grand Prix (officially known as the Formula 1 Rolex Turkish Grand Prix 2021) was a Formula One motor race, held on 10 October 2021 at Istanbul Park in Tuzla, Istanbul. It was the sixteenth of twenty-two rounds of the 2021 Formula One World Championship. This was the last Turkish Grand Prix until the scheduled return in 2027.

Lewis Hamilton, driving for the Mercedes team was fastest in the final segment of Saturday's qualifying session, however a ten-place grid penalty meant he started Sunday's race in eleventh place, promoting his team-mate Valtteri Bottas to pole position. Bottas won the race and scored the bonus point for the fastest lap, with Red Bull Racing drivers Max Verstappen and Sergio Pérez finishing second and third.

== Background ==
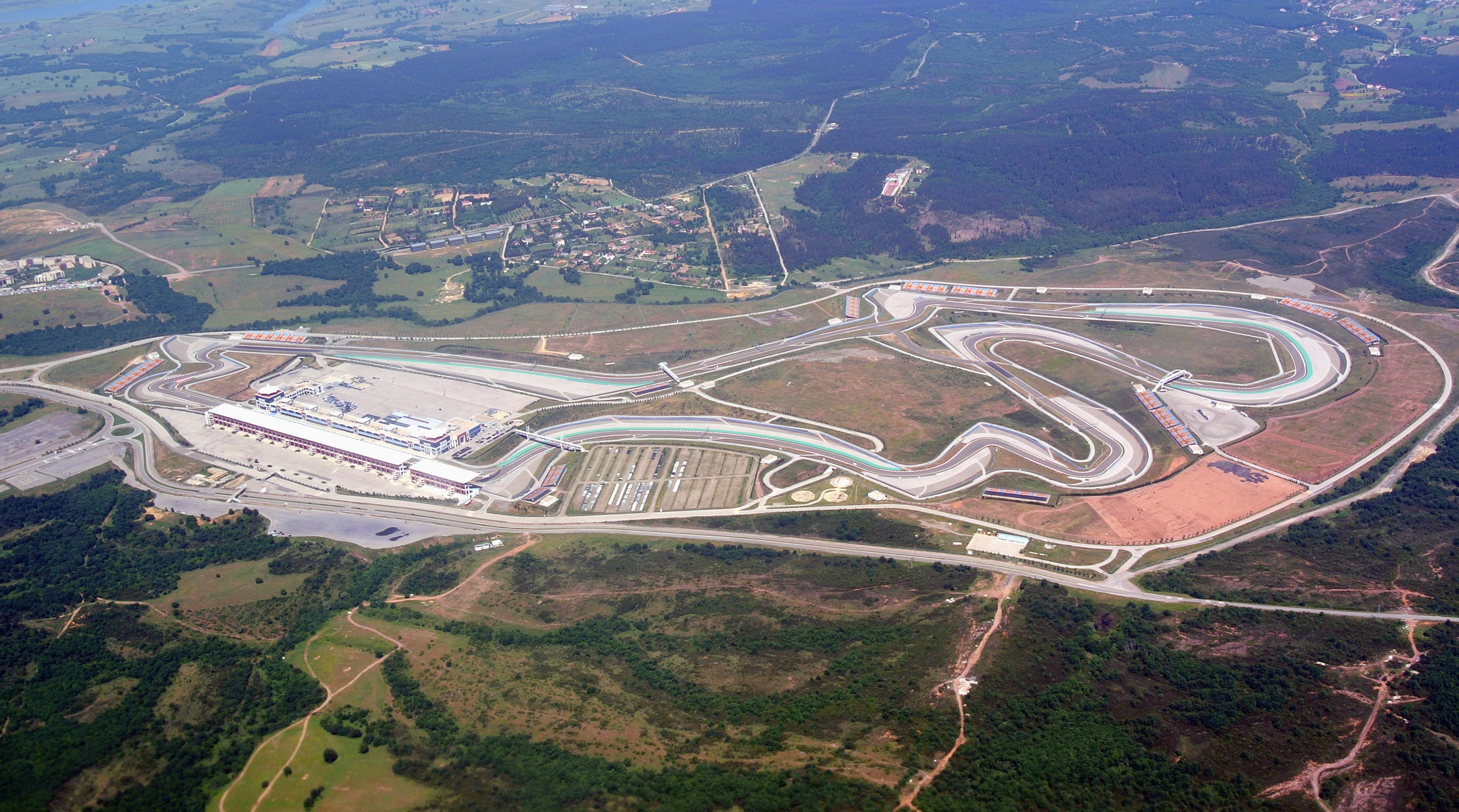
Aerial view of Istanbul Park

The event took place from 8–10 October at Istanbul Park in Tuzla, Istanbul, with the race covering fifty-eight laps of the fourteen-turn circuit. It was the ninth running of the Turkish Grand Prix, all of which have taken place at the same venue. It had previously been scheduled for 11–13 June (replacing the cancelled Canadian Grand Prix), but was postponed due to unfavourable quarantine requirements during the COVID-19 pandemic in Turkey and the travel restrictions from Turkey imposed by the British government. On 25 June, the event was readded to the schedule following the cancellation of the Singapore Grand Prix, which was scheduled for 1–3 October. On 28 August, it was pushed back one week to 8–10 October due to the reduction of the number of Grands Prix into the calendar. This was the second consecutive year in which the Turkish Grand Prix had appeared on the calendar as a replacement round.

While the 2020 Turkish Grand Prix had been held behind closed doors, the 2021 edition was to have spectators in attendance. Three previous Turkish Grand Prix winners entered this event in the form of Lewis Hamilton (who won the event twice previously in 2010 and 2020), Sebastian Vettel (who won the 2011 event), and Kimi Räikkönen (who won the inaugural Turkish Grand Prix in 2005).

Ten constructors entered two drivers each for the race, with no changes from the regular season entry list. Mission Winnow, the title sponsor of Scuderia Ferrari, was banned for this race. The name and sponsor logos were not used in any races from the French Grand Prix to the Italian Grand Prix for legal reasons, but were used at the Bahrain, Emilia Romagna, Portuguese, Spanish, Monaco, Azerbaijan, and Russian Grands Prix. Red Bull Racing and Scuderia AlphaTauri both ran tribute liveries to Honda, their engine supplier, on what was due to be Honda's home race, the Japanese Grand Prix. The Red Bull cars ran with a predominantly white livery, inspired by the livery with which the Honda team won their first Formula One World Championship race, the 1965 Mexican Grand Prix. The AlphaTauri cars featured arigato, a Japanese word for "Thank you".

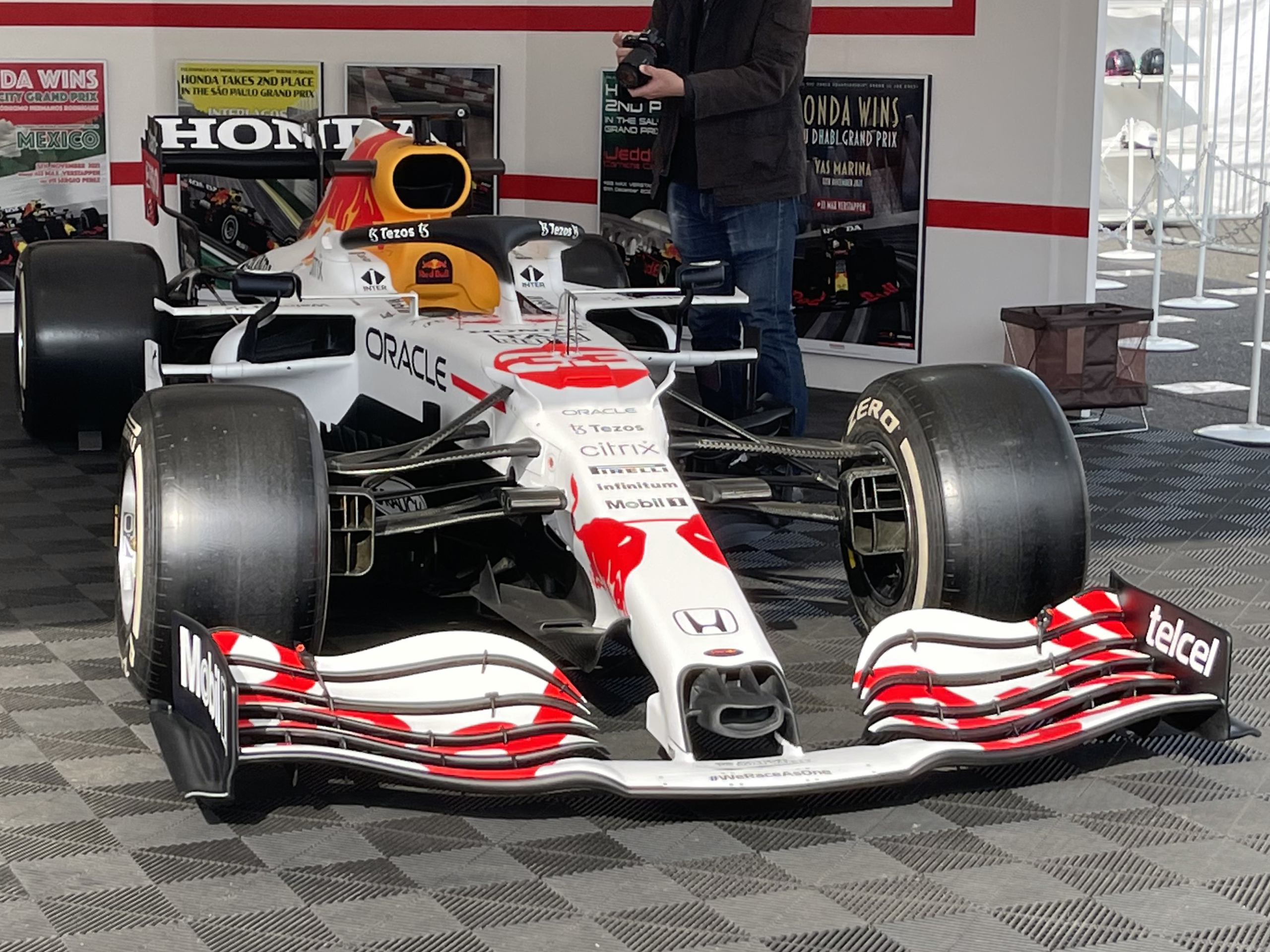
The Honda tribute livery ran by the Red Bull team, nicknamed "The White Bull".

Sole Formula One tyre-supplier Pirelli supplied their middle range of compounds in terms of hardness (the C2, C3, and C4). The track surface was water-blasted after the smooth tarmac provided little grip at the previous year's event. Following the first two practice sessions, Pirelli's Formula One boss Mario Isola stated that their tyre selection was "too aggressive". Isola stated that this was because Pirelli had only learned that the track was to be water-blasted after they had made their tyre choices. Ferrari driver Charles Leclerc said he hoped the track surface would still be slippery to boost his team's hopes of a good result at this race.

Going into the event, the Mercedes team led Red Bull by thirty-three points in the Constructors' Championship standings, whilst Mercedes driver Hamilton held a two-point lead over Red Bull driver Max Verstappen in the Drivers' Championship standings, with third-placed Mercedes driver Valtteri Bottas twelve points ahead of fourth-placed McLaren driver Lando Norris and thirty-one ahead of fifth-placed Red Bull driver Sergio Pérez. Five drivers including Hamilton also tried out a prototype glove design in the first practice session, designed to improve safety by preventing burns similar to those suffered by Romain Grosjean at the 2020 Bahrain Grand Prix.

== Free practice ==
A trio of free practice sessions took place on Friday and Saturday, each an hour in length. Hamilton set the fastest time of the first free practice session for Mercedes ahead of Red Bull driver Verstappen and Ferrari driver Leclerc. Hamilton was fastest for the second praction session ahead of Leclerc and Bottas. Whilst the first two practice sessions were held in dry conditions, the third one was held in the wet and ended with AlphaTauri driver Pierre Gasly fastest ahead of Red Bull drivers Verstappen and Pérez. The first two practice sessions ran without major incident, whilst the third one was briefly red flagged after Williams driver George Russell beached his car in the gravel.

== Qualifying ==
The qualifying practice session started at 15:00 local time (UTC+03:00) on the Saturday. The session is composed of three segments. (Note: The first lasts eighteen minutes, the second fifteen minutes, and the final twelve minutes.) At the end of the first two parts the five slowest drivers have their qualifying positions set and are prevented from participating in the rest of the qualifying session. (Note: Drivers who fail to set a lap time within 107% of the fastest time set during the first segment may be prevented from starting the race.) The final segment determines the top ten qualifying positions. The qualifying results are then used to determine the starting order of the race. Qualifying was held under overcast skies with ambient temperatures between eighteen and nineteen °C (64 and 66 °F) and surface temperatures between 21 and 24 °C (70 and 75 °F).

Hamilton set the fastest time in the first segment, whilst McLaren driver Daniel Ricciardo, Williams driver Nicholas Latifi, the Sauber Motorsport-run Alfa Romeo team's drivers Antonio Giovinazzi and Räikkönen, and Haas Formula driver Nikita Mazepin were the five slowest drivers and did not progress further in the session. Haas's Mick Schumacher progressed to the second segment of qualifying for the second time in his Formula One career.

Hamilton was again fastest in the second segment, whilst Ferrari driver Carlos Sainz Jr., Schumacher, Russell, Alpine F1 Team driver Esteban Ocon, and Aston Martin team driver Vettel were the five slowest drivers and did not progress to the final segment. Scuderia AlphaTauri driver Yuki Tsunoda reached the third segment for the first time since the 2021 Austrian Grand Prix. Sainz had extra power unit components installed which meant that he would start the race in last position no matter where he qualified.

In the third and final segment, Hamilton set the fastest time, with teammate Bottas second fastest. Hamilton took his fourth new internal combustion engine of the season, and as a result he received a ten-place grid penalty, which meant that Bottas was given the eighteenth pole position of his Formula One career. Verstappen set the third fastest time, with Leclerc fourth fastest in the session for Ferrari. Gasly was fifth quickest, with Alpine driver Fernando Alonso sixth fastest, Pérez seventh fastest, Norris eighth fastest, Aston Martin's Lance Stroll ninth fastest, and Tsunoda tenth fastest.

=== Qualifying classification ===
Pos.	No.	Driver	Constructor	Qualifying times			Final grid
Pos.	No.	Driver	Constructor	Q1	Q2	Q3	Final grid
1	44	(United Kingdom) Lewis Hamilton	Mercedes	1:24.585	1:23.082	1:22.868	11^{a}
2	77	(Finland) Valtteri Bottas	Mercedes	1:25.047	1:23.579	1:22.998	1
3	33	(Netherlands) Max Verstappen	Red Bull Racing-Honda	1:24.592	1:23.732	1:23.196	2
4	16	(Monaco) Charles Leclerc	Ferrari	1:24.869	1:24.015	1:23.265	3
5	10	(France) Pierre Gasly	AlphaTauri-Honda	1:24.704	1:23.817	1:23.326	4
6	14	(Spain) Fernando Alonso	Alpine-Renault	1:25.174	1:23.914	1:23.477	5
7	11	(Mexico) Sergio Pérez	Red Bull Racing-Honda	1:24.963	1:23.961	1:23.706	6
8	4	(United Kingdom) Lando Norris	McLaren-Mercedes	1:25.138	1:24.642	1:23.954	7
9	18	(Canada) Lance Stroll	Aston Martin-Mercedes	1:25.511	1:24.601	1:24.305	8
10	22	(Japan) Yuki Tsunoda	AlphaTauri-Honda	1:25.409	1:24.054	1:24.368	9
11	5	(Germany) Sebastian Vettel	Aston Martin-Mercedes	1:25.787	1:24.795	N/A	10
12	31	(France) Esteban Ocon	Alpine-Renault	1:25.422	1:24.842	N/A	12
13	63	(United Kingdom) George Russell	Williams-Mercedes	1:25.417	1:25.007	N/A	13
14	47	(Germany) Mick Schumacher	Haas-Ferrari	1:25.555	1:25.200	N/A	14
15	55	(Spain) Carlos Sainz Jr.	Ferrari	1:25.177	No time	N/A	19^{b}
16	3	(Australia) Daniel Ricciardo	McLaren-Mercedes	1:25.881	N/A	N/A	20^{c}
17	6	(Canada) Nicholas Latifi	Williams-Mercedes	1:26.086	N/A	N/A	15
18	99	(Italy) Antonio Giovinazzi	Alfa Romeo Racing-Ferrari	1:26.430	N/A	N/A	16
19	7	(Finland) Kimi Räikkönen	Alfa Romeo Racing-Ferrari	1:27.525	N/A	N/A	17
20	9	(Russian Automobile Federation) Nikita Mazepin (Note: Nikita Mazepin is Russian, but he competed as a neutral competitor using the designation RAF (Russian Automobile Federation), as the Court of Arbitration for Sport upheld a ban on Russia competing at World Championships. The ban was implemented by the World Anti-Doping Agency in response to the state-sponsored doping program of Russian athletes.)	Haas-Ferrari	1:28.449	N/A	N/A	18
107% time: 1:30.505

==== Notes ====
- ^a – Lewis Hamilton received a ten-place grid penalty for exceeding his quota of internal combustion engines.
- ^b – Carlos Sainz Jr. was required to start the race from the back of the grid for exceeding his quota of power unit elements.
- ^c – Daniel Ricciardo was required to start the race from the back of the grid for exceeding his quota of power unit elements.

== Race ==
The race started at 15:00 local time (UTC+03:00) on the Sunday. The race took place under overcast skies with some light rain throughout, with ambient temperatures between fifteen and sixteen °C (59 and 61 °F) and surface temperatures between seventeen and eighteen °C (63 and 64 °F). Ferrari and McLaren replaced the hybrid systems on Sainz's and Ricciardo's cars, respectively, which resulted in them starting from the back of the grid. Hamilton also received a ten-place grid penalty for exceeding his number of permitted internal combustion engines.

On the first lap, Alonso and Gasly made contact at the first corner, with Gasly receiving a five-second penalty, whilst Alonso span and rejoined in fifteenth place. Alonso later made contact with Schumacher, with Alonso receiving the same penalty. Hamilton passed Vettel on the first lap, and overtook a defensive Tsunoda on the eighth lap. By the eleventh lap, Hamilton had taken sixth place as he passed Norris, whom he was over a second-per-lap quicker than. On the fourteenth lap, Sainz dived down the inside of Vettel at the eleventh turn, but he had to go on the inside kerb to stay on the race track in the damp conditions. This upset the car and Sainz hit Vettel's front left tyre. Sainz made multiple overtakes in the opening phase of the race, progressing from his nineteenth-place starting position to ninth by lap eighteen.

Throughout the race, team strategists had to deliberate over when to change tyres, with the track not drying quickly enough to facilitate a move to slick tyres but new intermediate wet tyres likely be initially slower than the older ones already on the cars due to rubber graining. On the thirty-fourth lap, Hamilton briefly got ahead of Pérez for fourth place out of the final corner, but the Red Bull driver retook the position on the first turn of the thirty-fifth lap. Verstappen made a pit stop for a new set of intermediate wet tyres at the end of the thirty-sixth lap, with Bottas doing the same on the following lap, which temporarily gave Leclerc the lead. At this time Vettel experimented with a change to medium slick tyres, but this proved unsuccessful and he made a further pit stop to change back onto intermediate wet tyres the following lap. Leclerc hoped to retain the lead by going non-stop to the end, whilst Hamilton wanted to wait until the track was dry enough for slicks to make a stop. Bottas overtook Leclerc to regain the lead on the forty-seventh lap, after which Leclerc made a pit stop to change tyres. On the fiftieth lap Hamilton also stopped, with the team believing not doing so then would result in him losing fifth place to Gasly. Both Hamilton and Leclerc expressed dissatisfaction following their tyre changes.

Bottas took his final race win for Mercedes ahead of Verstappen. As of 2026, this is Valtteri Bottas's most recent victory in Formula One. Verstappen retook the lead in the Drivers' Championship standings from Hamilton, who finished fifth after a late pit stop. Ocon finished the race in tenth place after not making any pit stops, losing forty-eight seconds to Sainz over the last ten laps. Ocon was the first driver to complete a full race distance without making a pit stop in twenty-four years since Mika Salo at the 1997 Monaco Grand Prix. There were no retirements.

=== Post-race ===
Martin Brundle believed that Hamilton should take responsibility for his initial pit strategy saying he should have respected the initial instructions to pit. 2009 World Champion Jenson Button, who was commentating on the race, also stated he felt Hamilton only pitted at all because he was unaware he would lose track positions after his stop. Gasly said following the race the drivers would intend to speak with race director following controversy over recent stewards decisions, with Gasly penalised in the race for his first lap contact with Alonso and the decision not to penalise Alonso for improving his laptime in Saturday qualifying under double waved yellows. In light of the Alonso qualifying incident, Masi said the sport would "quite possibly" adopt a system from the following race onwards whereby any lap completed under double waved yellows would automatically be deleted. Alonso apologised to Schumacher over the collision on the opening lap of the race. Verstappen felt Mercedes had stepped up their performance significantly compared to previous races during the weekend. Christian Horner was surprised by Mercedes's recent improvement in straightline speed. Both Lando Norris and Yuki Tsunoda complained of having their visibility hindered by "dirty spray" (surface water mixed with oil, dust, and dirt), with the latter feeling it contributed to a spin which he believed lost him a points-scoring position. Masi said he had not heard complaints from other drivers and never believed the conditions in Turkey were bad enough to warrant suspending the race.

=== Race classification ===
Pos.	No.	Driver	Constructor	Laps	Time/Retired	Grid	Points
1	77	(Finland) Valtteri Bottas	Mercedes	58	1:31:04.103	1	26^{1}
2	33	(Netherlands) Max Verstappen	Red Bull Racing-Honda	58	+14.584	2	18
3	11	(Mexico) Sergio Pérez	Red Bull Racing-Honda	58	+33.741	6	15
4	16	(Monaco) Charles Leclerc	Ferrari	58	+37.814	3	12
5	44	(United Kingdom) Lewis Hamilton	Mercedes	58	+41.812	11	10
6	10	(France) Pierre Gasly	AlphaTauri-Honda	58	+44.292	4	8
7	4	(United Kingdom) Lando Norris	McLaren-Mercedes	58	+47.213	7	6
8	55	(Spain) Carlos Sainz Jr.	Ferrari	58	+51.526	19	4
9	18	(Canada) Lance Stroll	Aston Martin-Mercedes	58	+1:22.018	8	2
10	31	(France) Esteban Ocon	Alpine-Renault	57	+1 lap	12	1
11	99	(Italy) Antonio Giovinazzi	Alfa Romeo Racing-Ferrari	57	+1 lap	16	
12	7	(Finland) Kimi Räikkönen	Alfa Romeo Racing-Ferrari	57	+1 lap	17	
13	3	(Australia) Daniel Ricciardo	McLaren-Mercedes	57	+1 lap	20	
14	22	(Japan) Yuki Tsunoda	AlphaTauri-Honda	57	+1 lap	9	
15	63	(United Kingdom) George Russell	Williams-Mercedes	57	+1 lap	13	
16	14	(Spain) Fernando Alonso	Alpine-Renault	57	+1 lap	5	
17	6	(Canada) Nicholas Latifi	Williams-Mercedes	57	+1 lap	15	
18	5	(Germany) Sebastian Vettel	Aston Martin-Mercedes	57	+1 lap	10	
19	47	(Germany) Mick Schumacher	Haas-Ferrari	56	+2 laps	14	
20	9	(Russian Automobile Federation) Nikita Mazepin	Haas-Ferrari	56	+2 laps	18	
Fastest lap: (Finland) Valtteri Bottas (Mercedes) – 1:30.432 (lap 58)

==== Notes ====
- ^1 – Includes one point for fastest lap.

== Championship standings after the race ==
Drivers' Championship standings

	Pos.	Driver	Points
1	1	(Netherlands) Max Verstappen	262.5
1	2	(United Kingdom) Lewis Hamilton	256.5
Unchanged	3	(Finland) Valtteri Bottas	177
Unchanged	4	(United Kingdom) Lando Norris	145
Unchanged	5	(Mexico) Sergio Pérez	135

Constructors' Championship standings

	Pos.	Constructor	Points
Unchanged	1	(Germany) Mercedes	433.5
Unchanged	2	(Austria) Red Bull Racing-Honda	397.5
Unchanged	3	(United Kingdom) McLaren-Mercedes	240
Unchanged	4	(Italy) Ferrari	232.5
Unchanged	5	(France) Alpine-Renault	104

- Note: Only the top five positions are included for both sets of standings.

== Notes ==
Previous race: 2021 Russian Grand Prix	FIA Formula One World Championship; 2021 season	Next race: 2021 United States Grand Prix
Previous race: 2020 Turkish Grand Prix	Turkish Grand Prix	Next race: 2027 Turkish Grand Prix
