= Turkish Grand Prix =

Formula One motor race

- Istanbul Park

Race information
- Number of times held: 9
- First held: 2005
- Most wins (drivers): (Brazil) Felipe Massa (3)
- Most wins (constructors): (Italy) Ferrari (3)
- Circuit length: 5.338 km (3.317 miles)
- Race length: 309.396 km (192.250 miles)
- Laps: 58

Last race (2021)

Pole position
- (Finland) Valtteri Bottas (Note: Lewis Hamilton set the fastest time in qualifying, but received a ten-place grid penalty for exceeding his quota of internal combustion engines. Valtteri Bottas was promoted to pole position in his place.); Mercedes; 1:22.998

Podium
- 1. (Finland) V. Bottas; Mercedes; 1:31:04.103; 2. (Netherlands) M. Verstappen; Red Bull Racing-Honda; +14.584; 3. (Mexico) S. Pérez; Red Bull Racing-Honda; +33.741

Fastest lap
- (Finland) Valtteri Bottas; Mercedes; 1:30.432

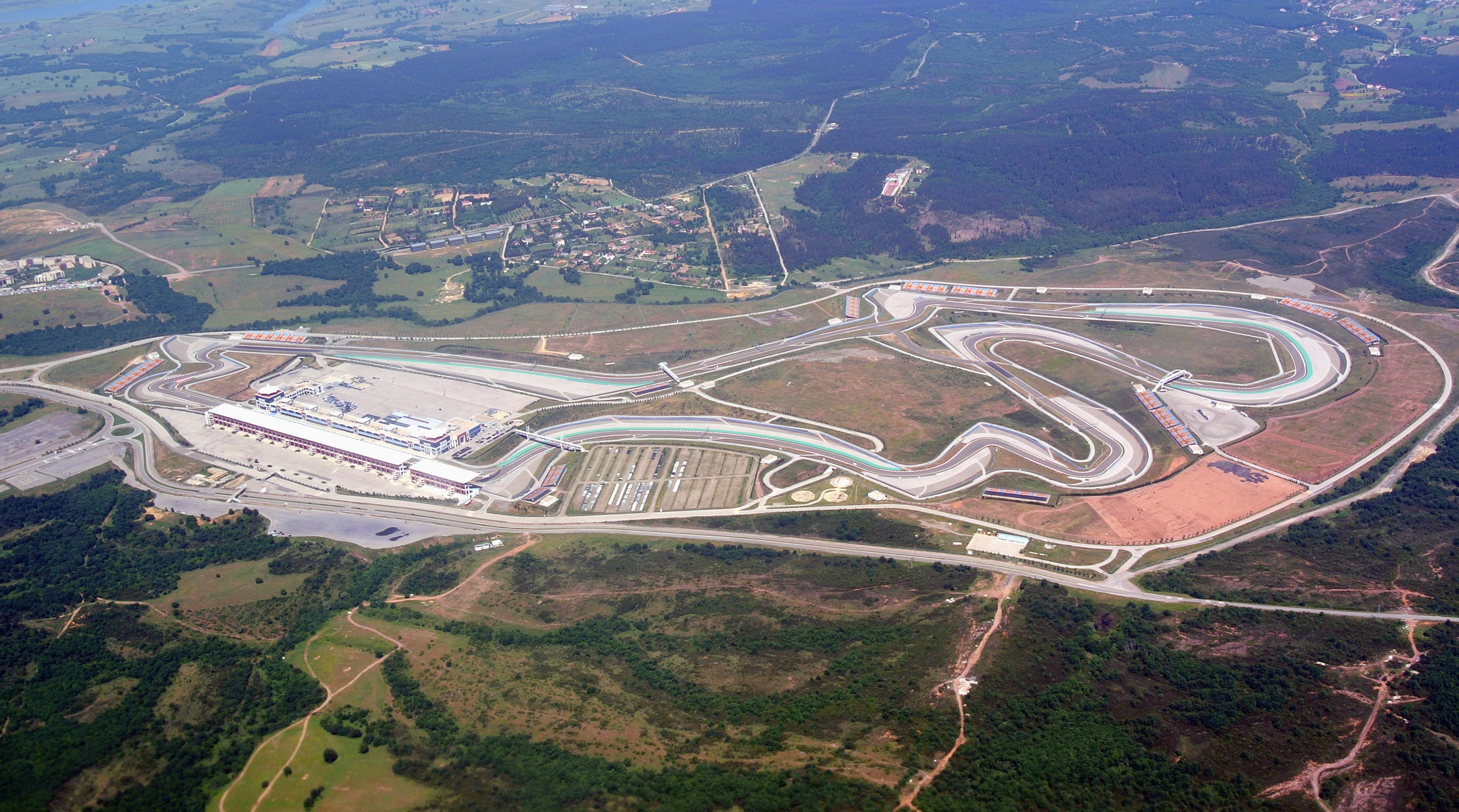
Aerial view of Istanbul Park

The Turkish Grand Prix (Turkish: Türkiye Grand Prix) is a Formula One motor race held at Istanbul Park, designed by Hermann Tilke. The race was part of the Formula One World Championship between 2005 and 2011, and returned in 2020 and 2021 due to the COVID-19 pandemic. Felipe Massa and Ferrari are the most successful driver and constructor respectively, having won the race three times each. The Turkish Grand Prix is due to return from 2027 to 2031.

== History ==
Despite the major challenges involved including completing part of the journey by boat, teams drove their equipment from their European factories to the track for each meeting except the 2020 race.

The nature of the circuit resulted in the inaugural 2005 Turkish Grand Prix weekend seeing exciting on-track action, with many drivers spinning off throughout the weekend due to pushing too hard, particularly at Turn 8 where Juan Pablo Montoya ran wide with two laps to go following a tangle with the Jordan of Tiago Monteiro. This allowed Fernando Alonso to take second place behind Kimi Räikkönen, an event which had a significant bearing on their battle for the World Championship headed towards its culmination.

A year later, Felipe Massa took his first pole position and victory at Tuzla. The Ferraris were 1–2 in early stages of the race, with Massa ahead of Michael Schumacher. Vitantonio Liuzzi's spin brought out the safety car and the Ferraris had to pit on the same lap. Alonso was able to get past Schumacher and the order stayed until the end of the race. Massa repeated in 2007 ahead of his new teammate Räikkönen.

In 2008, the race was held in May. Two-stopping Massa won the race ahead of three-stopping Lewis Hamilton, although Hamilton had passed him during the race.

For 2011, the race was put in doubt because Bernie Ecclestone wanted to double the fees for hosting the race. Ecclestone later confirmed, however, that it would feature on the 2011 calendar, which would expand to twenty races with the addition of the Indian Grand Prix (although the cancellation of the Bahrain Grand Prix meant only nineteen Grands Prix were held).

On 30 July 2011 it was announced that the Turkish Grand Prix would not be on the calendar from 2012 due to a lack of agreement on the annual cost. The race organisers claimed that the hosting fee was too high, while Ecclestone blamed poor promotion for the race's lack of profitability. On 9 January 2013 the government chose not to approve the Formula 1 deal that would have held the race in Tuzla in 2013. The project, set to cost Turkey around 20 million dollars in total, needed to receive 13 million dollars of state funding. The government, however, did not give its approval, and the project fell through.

Due to the COVID-19 pandemic in 2020 several originally scheduled races were cancelled. The Turkish Grand Prix was added to the revised calendar in August 2020 and the race weekend was held between 13 and 15 November 2020. The Turkish Grand Prix returned in 2021, with the race held in October. Initially brought in as a replacement for the Canadian Grand Prix, the event was postponed due to travel restrictions from Turkey imposed by the British government with the Styrian Grand Prix taking its place. The race was later re-added to the calendar to take the place of the cancelled Singapore Grand Prix.

In April 2026, Formula One Group reached an agreement with the Turkish government under which the Turkish Grand Prix would return to Istanbul Park for at least five seasons, spanning from 2027 to 2031.

== Races ==
=== 2005 ===
The winner of the inaugural Turkish Grand Prix was Kimi Räikkönen (McLaren-Mercedes), Fernando Alonso (Renault F1) came in second, followed by Juan Pablo Montoya (McLaren-Mercedes).

The fastest race lap was achieved by Juan Pablo Montoya in 1'24.770, a time which is yet to be surpassed.

=== 2006 ===
The 2006 Turkish Grand Prix was won by Felipe Massa (Ferrari), who led from start to finish, Fernando Alonso (Renault F1) came in second and seven-time world champion Michael Schumacher in third.

The fastest race lap was achieved by Michael Schumacher in 1'28.005.

As part of the podium ceremony after the 2006 race, the winner's trophy was presented by Mehmet Ali Talat, who was introduced to television viewers via the captions as the president of the Turkish Republic of Northern Cyprus, a state which is recognised only by Turkey. The FIA announced they would be investigating this incident, as a possible breach of the organisation's political neutrality. The identity of the person who would present the winner's trophy was left to the last minute, leaving the FIA no time to veto the choice. Some commentators feared this incident could jeopardise the future of the Turkish Grand Prix, and possibly also Turkey's round of the World Rally Championship, another FIA-sanctioned series. It was concluded with a 5 million dollar fine, which was later reduced by half.

=== 2007 ===
The winner of the 2007 Turkish Grand Prix was the Brazilian Felipe Massa (Ferrari), who won the race for the second year in a row having qualified in pole position. During the press conference following the race, he commented that "the Istanbul Park was the track where he made his career turn-around, and finally began winning races." He also praised the track as well as the city.

The fastest race lap was achieved by Kimi Räikkönen in 1'27.295.

=== 2008 ===
The winner of the 2008 Turkish Grand Prix was the Brazilian Felipe Massa (Ferrari), who won the race for the third year in a row, also starting in pole position.

The fastest race lap was achieved by Kimi Räikkönen in 1'26.506.

=== 2009 ===
The winner was the British Jenson Button of Brawn GP, with Australian Mark Webber and Germany's Sebastian Vettel of Red Bull Racing completing the podium.

The fastest race lap was achieved by eventual winner, Jenson Button with a 1'27.579.

=== 2010 ===
The winner was Britain's Lewis Hamilton of McLaren, with teammate and countryman Jenson Button in second and Australian Mark Webber of Red Bull Racing in third. Webber had started in pole position and had been leading the race until he collided with teammate Sebastian Vettel.

=== 2011 ===
Sebastian Vettel won the 2011 event for Red Bull Racing, ahead of team-mate Mark Webber and Ferrari's Fernando Alonso. The race featured the greatest recorded number of pit stops and overtaking manoeuvres in a dry race in F1 history.

=== 2020 ===
Due to the COVID-19 pandemic in 2020 several originally scheduled races were cancelled. The Turkish Grand Prix was added to the revised calendar in August 2020 and the race weekend was held between 13 and 15 November 2020. The race weekend was marred by a newly resurfaced track, which Pirelli was not aware of and could not test or bring appropriate tyres for, and heavy rainfall exacerbating the already slippery conditions. Lance Stroll of Racing Point took pole position in wet conditions. It was Lewis Hamilton of Mercedes, starting from sixth, who took the lead in the middle stages of the race and led to win the race and claim his seventh world title, equaling Michael Schumacher's record.

=== 2021 ===
The race was won by Valtteri Bottas for Mercedes, who started from pole position and led most of the race.

== Winners ==
=== By year ===
All Turkish Grands Prix were held at Istanbul Park.

Year	Driver	Constructor	Report
2005	(Finland) Kimi Räikkönen	McLaren-Mercedes	Report
2006	(Brazil) Felipe Massa	Ferrari	Report
2007	(Brazil) Felipe Massa	Ferrari	Report
2008	(Brazil) Felipe Massa	Ferrari	Report
2009	(United Kingdom) Jenson Button	Brawn-Mercedes	Report
2010	(United Kingdom) Lewis Hamilton	McLaren-Mercedes	Report
2011	(Germany) Sebastian Vettel	Red Bull Racing-Renault	Report
2012 – 2019	Not held		
2020	(United Kingdom) Lewis Hamilton	Mercedes	Report
2021	(Finland) Valtteri Bottas	Mercedes	Report

=== Repeat winners (drivers) ===
Drivers in bold are competing in the Formula One championship in 2026.

Wins	Driver	Years won
3	(Brazil) Felipe Massa	2006, 2007, 2008
2	**(United Kingdom) Lewis Hamilton**	2010, 2020

=== Repeat winners (constructors) ===
Constructors in bold are competing in the Formula One championship in 2026.

Wins	Constructor	Years won
3	(Italy) **Ferrari**	2006, 2007, 2008
2	(United Kingdom) **McLaren**	2005, 2010
2	(Germany) **Mercedes**	2020, 2021

=== Repeat winners (engine manufacturers) ===
Manufacturers in bold are competing in the Formula One championship in 2026.

Wins	Manufacturer	Years won
5	(Germany) **Mercedes** *	2005, 2009, 2010, 2020, 2021
3	(Italy) **Ferrari**	2006, 2007, 2008

* Built by Ilmor in 2005
