= 2009 Turkish Grand Prix =

Coordinates: 40°57′06″N 29°24′18″E

Race 7 of 17 in the 2009 Formula One World Championship
← Previous race	Next race →

Race details
- Date: 7 June 2009
- Official name: 2009 Formula 1 ING Turkish Grand Prix
- Location: Istanbul Park, Tuzla, Turkey
- Course: Permanent racing facility
- Course length: 5.338 km (3.317 miles)
- Distance: 58 laps, 309.396 km (192.250 miles)
- Weather: Sunny
- Attendance: 36,000 (Weekend)

Pole position
Driver	(Germany) Sebastian Vettel	Red Bull-Renault
- Time: 1:28.316

Fastest lap
Driver	(United Kingdom) Jenson Button	Brawn-Mercedes
- Time: 1:27.579 on lap 40

Podium
First	(United Kingdom) Jenson Button	Brawn-Mercedes
Second	(Australia) Mark Webber	Red Bull-Renault
Third	(Germany) Sebastian Vettel	Red Bull-Renault

The 2009 Turkish Grand Prix (officially the 2009 Formula 1 ING Turkish Grand Prix) was the seventh motor race of the 2009 FIA Formula One World Championship. It was held on 7 June 2009 at Istanbul Park, Tuzla, Turkey.

The race was won by Jenson Button, with Mark Webber and Sebastian Vettel of Red Bull Racing completing the podium. Vettel had qualified on pole but a mistake on the first lap scuppered his chances of victory.

== Report ==
=== Background ===
Jenson Button led the Drivers' Championship by 16 points from his teammate at Brawn, Rubens Barrichello going into the race, while Brawn GP led the Constructors' Championship by 43.5 points from Red Bull.

Tyre supplier Bridgestone selected the hard and soft tyres for the Grand Prix weekend. Prior to the race, the Turkish Grand Prix had produced different winners in the last four years: Felipe Massa (Ferrari; 2006, 2007, 2008) and Kimi Räikkönen (McLaren-Mercedes; 2005) were the first to cross the finish line. Massa also became the Brazilian driver to win the race three times (2006, 2007 and 2008).

=== Practice ===
In Friday practice 1, Williams, Ferrari and McLaren performed well, Nico Rosberg, Lewis Hamilton and Jarno Trulli posting the top 3 times. Brawn, Toyota, Red Bull and Renault ran mid field during the session with BMW and STR backmarking.

In Friday practice 2, Williams, Renault and Red Bull were the most consistent performers, Heikki Kovalainen, Fernando Alonso and Robert Kubica posted the top 3 times. Ferrari, Brawn and Toyota ran mid field during the session with Force India and STR backmarking.

After both Friday practice sessions, individual performances were quite mixed, the only consistent constructor was Williams as BMW and McLaren saw mixed results, while top running teams Brawn and Red Bull ran upper mid field for both sessions.

=== Qualifying ===
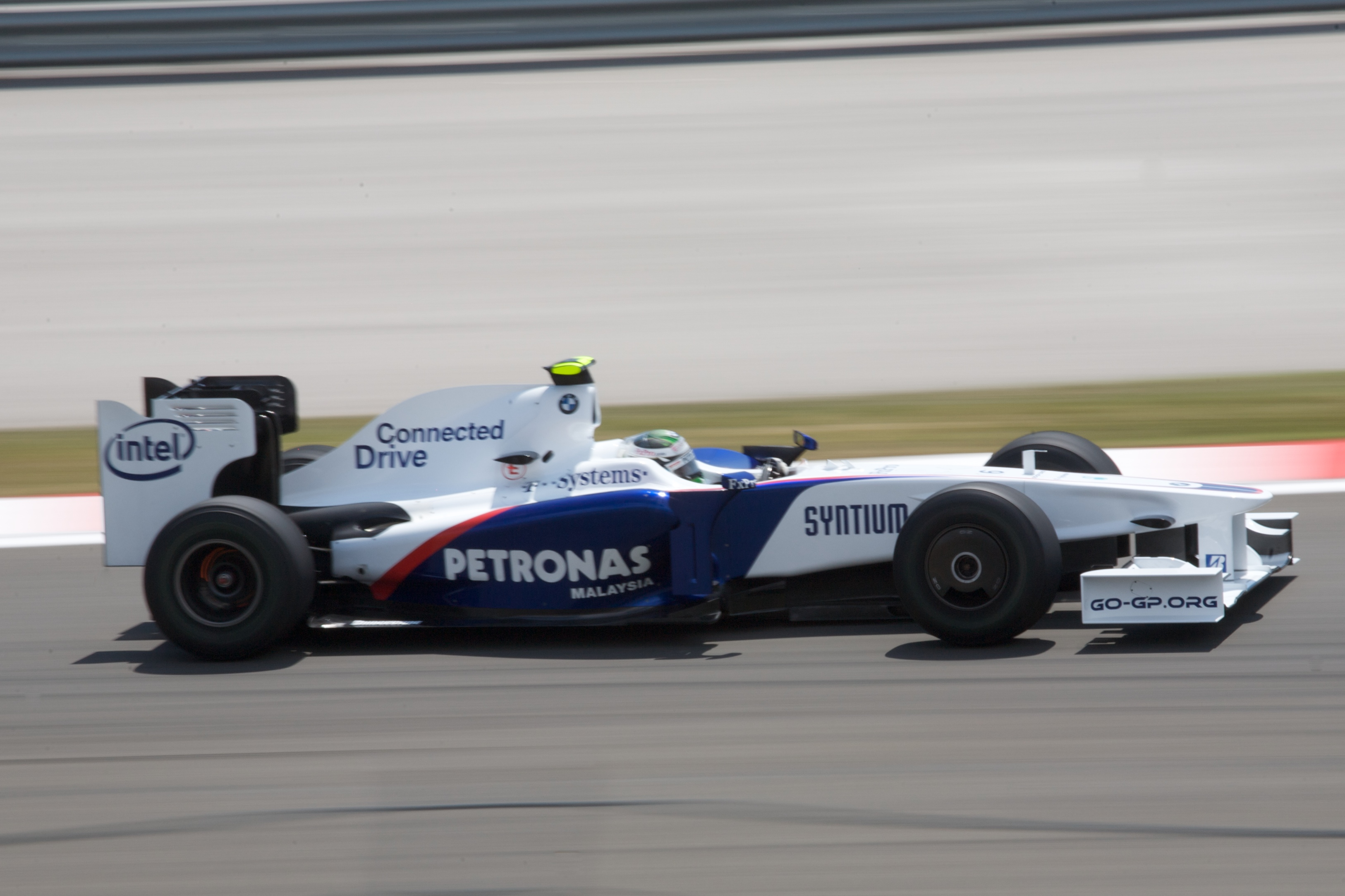
Nick Heidfeld qualified his BMW Sauber in eleventh position.

Sebastian Vettel dominated the qualifying session on Saturday 6 June 2009, setting the fastest time in all three parts of qualifying to claim his second pole position of the season, and third of his career.

The first knockout session, to eliminate the five slowest cars, claimed the scalp of reigning World Champion Lewis Hamilton – only the second time the Englishman had failed to progress from the first session. Also eliminated were Nelson Piquet Jr., Sébastien Buemi, Giancarlo Fisichella and Sébastien Bourdais. They all produced times in the 1:28's.

In the second knockout session, the top 10, who progressed to the final shoot-out for pole, were separated by just 0.4 seconds, with Fernando Alonso and Nico Rosberg just sneaking through. Nick Heidfeld, Kazuki Nakajima, Timo Glock, Heikki Kovalainen and Adrian Sutil were knocked out, Heidfeld qualifying 11th for the second race in succession.

The third session to determine pole position was a tense battle with numerous drivers thinking they had claimed pole only for their time to be bettered.

Vettel was on provisional pole with a time of 1:28.801, with just a few minutes of the session remaining. Vettel's team mate Mark Webber then posted a 1:28.6, only for Button to go two-tenths of a second quicker after the chequered flag fell. Vettel, however, still had one lap left in him and went quicker again, reclaiming pole with a 1:28.316. Button's teammate Rubens Barrichello also improved on his final lap, moving up to third position, ahead of Webber, with a 1:28.5.

=== Race ===
History would favour Vettel, the previous four Turkish Grands Prix having been won from pole position. Button however had two more laps of fuel in qualifying, meaning he would have been on pole fuel-corrected.

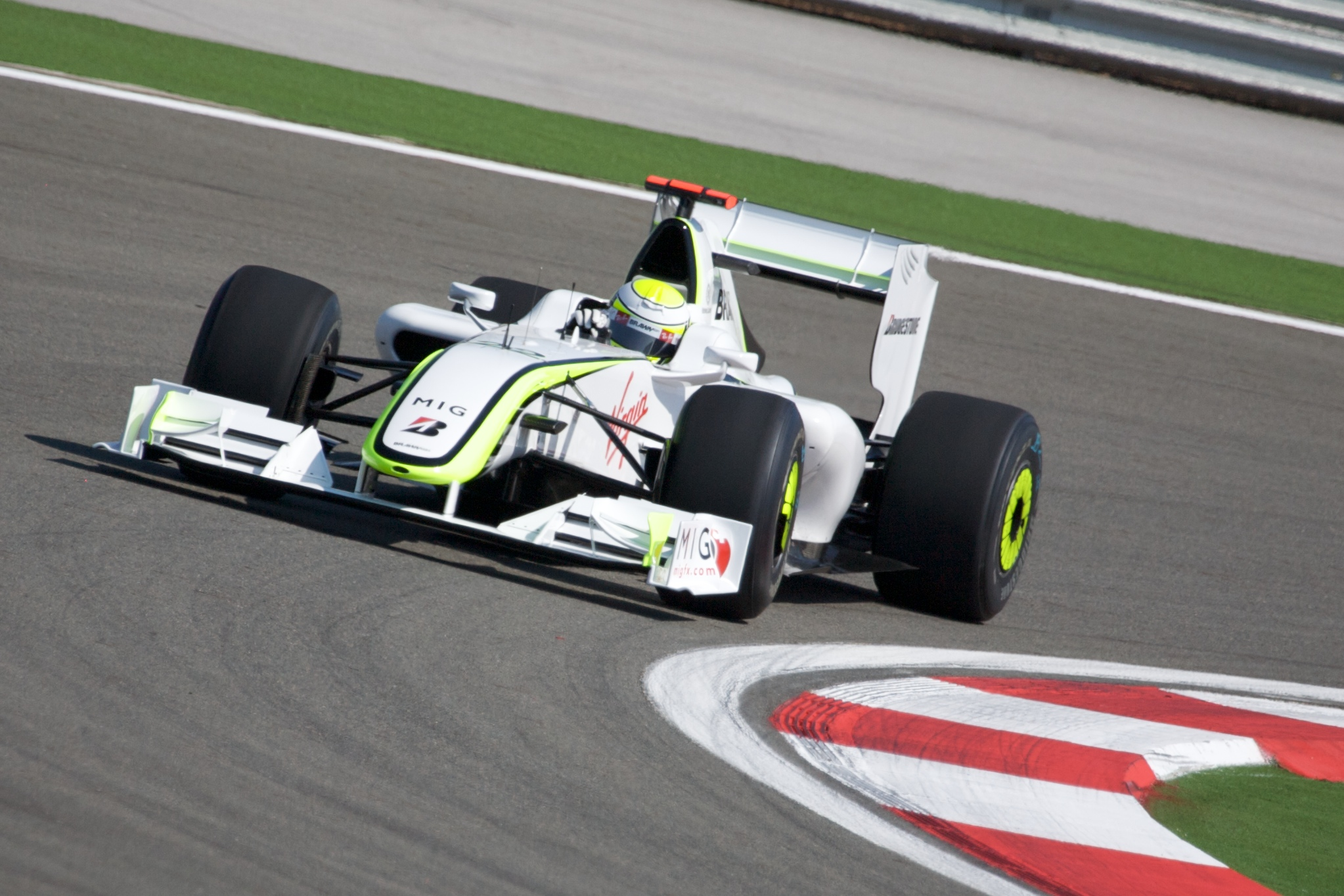
Jenson Button won the race after taking the lead from polesitter Sebastian Vettel on the first lap.

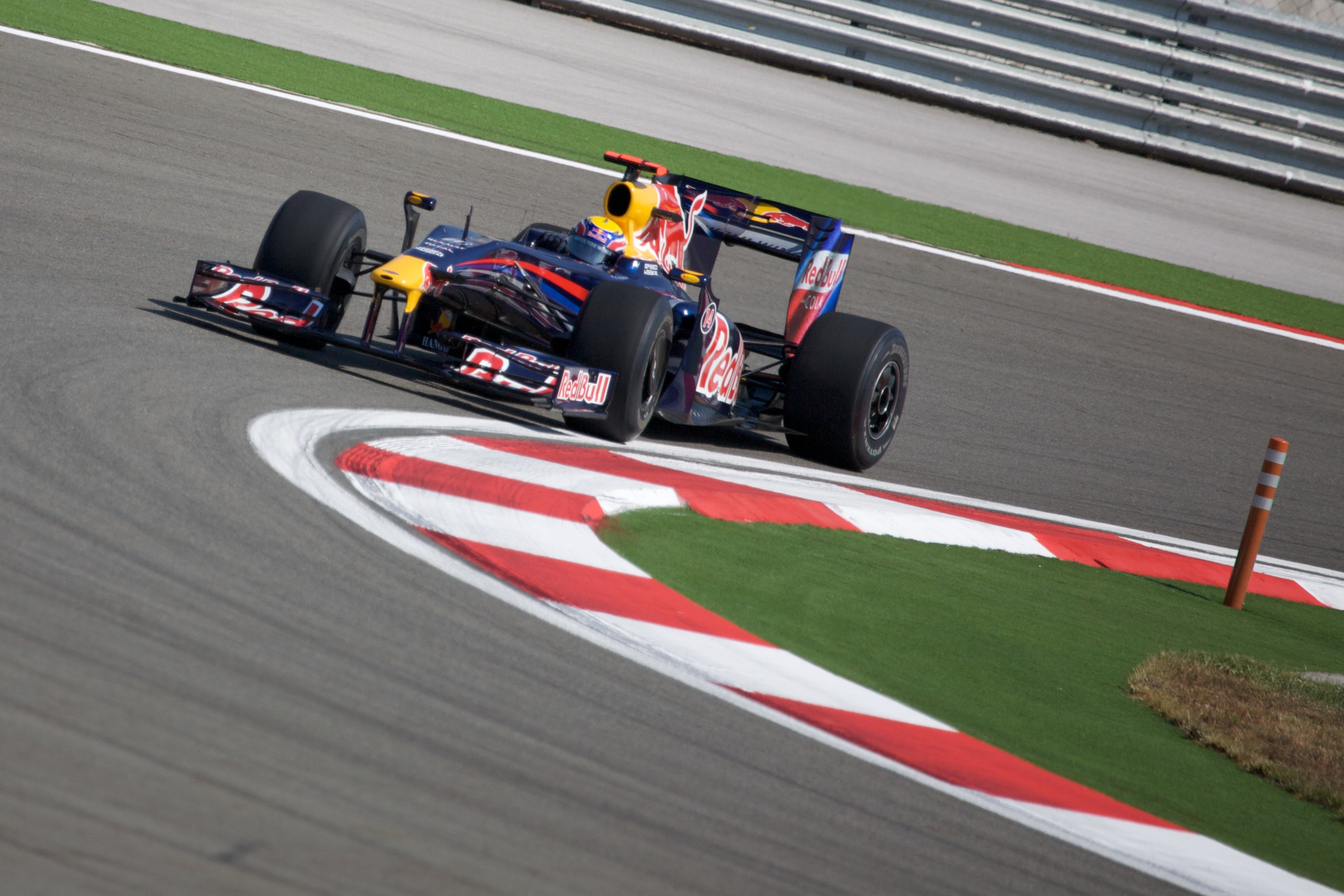
Mark Webber qualified fourth and finished second.

Vettel initially made a strong start from pole, beating Button into the first corner. Vettel then ran wide at the tenth turn, gifting Button the lead. Button's Brawn team-mate had a less fortunate start, a clutch problem dropping him from third on the grid to thirteenth by the end of the first lap. Webber was running third, having initially been passed by Jarno Trulli before the Australian regained his position. Felipe Massa had moved up to fifth position, ahead of Kimi Räikkönen and Fernando Alonso. Reigning world champion Hamilton had lost a place on the first lap, meaning he was running in 17th position out of 20 runners.

At the front Button began to open up a lead over Vettel but the action was in the midfield, Nico Rosberg getting past both Ferraris to move up to fifth by lap six. On lap eight, Barrichello spun trying to pass Heikki Kovalainen after a wheel-to-wheel battle from Turns 9 to 16. The Brazilian dropped to seventeenth but quickly regained two places before losing part of his front wing in a clash with Adrian Sutil on lap eleven. Barrichello pitted on lap thirteen, conversely teammate Button had serenely opened up a 5.6 second lead at the front of the race.

The leaders began pitting for their first stops on lap 15, with Vettel the first to stop, followed by Button two laps later and Webber and Rosberg on lap 18. Significantly, Vettel was fuelled lighter on a three-stop strategy, in contrast to the other leaders two-stop strategy. Vettel was therefore able to close the gap on Button after the first stops with his lighter car, but was unable to make the pass he needed before his second stop on lap 29. Vettel exited the pits behind Webber, with all the leaders due to make one more pit stop.

On lap 37, Hamilton was lapped by championship leader Button, who made his second stop along with Webber on lap 43. Vettel briefly ran second but had to make his third pit stop on lap 48, demoting him back to third position. Trulli emerged from the pit stops in fourth, narrowly ahead of Rosberg, while Robert Kubica and Timo Glock had moved into the final points paying positions as Raikkonen struggled and Kazuki Nakajima was delayed by a left front wheel covering failing to attach in his final stop. Meanwhile, Barrichello's miserable race finally ended as he retired with a gearbox problem while running near the back of the field. This was the first time that a Brawn GP car was not running at the finish of a race.

Although Vettel closed the gap to Webber to just 0.7 seconds as the chequered flag fell, there were no significant positional changes in the final laps as Button cruised to his sixth win from the first seven races, a feat only matched by Alberto Ascari, Juan Manuel Fangio, Jim Clark and Michael Schumacher – who all won the World Championship after achieving this feat. Button also became the first Englishman to score a record four consecutive victories since Nigel Mansell in 1992, who also went on to win the title that season.

The race attendance was reported as a meager 36,000, with the venue capable of holding 150,000.

== Classification ==
=== Qualifying ===
Cars that used KERS are marked with "‡"

Pos	No	Driver	Constructor	Part 1	Part 2	Part 3	Grid
1	15	(Germany) Sebastian Vettel	Red Bull-Renault	1:27.330	1:27.016	1:28.316	1
2	22	(United Kingdom) Jenson Button	Brawn-Mercedes	1:27.355	1:27.230	1:28.421	2
3	23	(Brazil) Rubens Barrichello	Brawn-Mercedes	1:27.371	1:27.418	1:28.579	3
4	14	(Australia) Mark Webber	Red Bull-Renault	1:27.466	1:27.416	1:28.613	4
5	9	(Italy) Jarno Trulli	Toyota	1:27.529	1:27.195	1:28.666	5
6	4‡	(Finland) Kimi Räikkönen	Ferrari	1:27.556	1:27.387	1:28.815	6
7	3‡	(Brazil) Felipe Massa	Ferrari	1:27.508	1:27.349	1:28.858	7
8	7	(Spain) Fernando Alonso	Renault	1:27.988	1:27.473	1:29.075	8
9	16	(Germany) Nico Rosberg	Williams-Toyota	1:27.517	1:27.418	1:29.191	9
10	5	(Poland) Robert Kubica	BMW Sauber	1:27.788	1:27.455	1:29.357	10
11	6	(Germany) Nick Heidfeld	BMW Sauber	1:27.795	1:27.521		11
12	17	(Japan) Kazuki Nakajima	Williams-Toyota	1:27.691	1:27.629		12
13	10	(Germany) Timo Glock	Toyota	1:28.160	1:27.795		13
14	2‡	(Finland) Heikki Kovalainen	McLaren-Mercedes	1:28.199	1:28.207		14
15	20	(Germany) Adrian Sutil	Force India-Mercedes	1:28.278	1:28.391		15
16	1‡	(United Kingdom) Lewis Hamilton	McLaren-Mercedes	1:28.318			16
17	8	(Brazil) Nelson Piquet Jr.	Renault	1:28.582			17
18	12	(Switzerland) Sébastien Buemi	Toro Rosso-Ferrari	1:28.708			18
19	21	(Italy) Giancarlo Fisichella	Force India-Mercedes	1:28.717			19
20	11	(France) Sébastien Bourdais	Toro Rosso-Ferrari	1:28.918			20

=== Race ===
Pos	No	Driver	Constructor	Laps	Time/Retired	Grid	Points
1	22	(United Kingdom) Jenson Button	Brawn-Mercedes	58	1:26:24.848	2	10
2	14	(Australia) Mark Webber	Red Bull-Renault	58	+6.714	4	8
3	15	(Germany) Sebastian Vettel	Red Bull-Renault	58	+7.461	1	6
4	9	(Italy) Jarno Trulli	Toyota	58	+27.843	5	5
5	16	(Germany) Nico Rosberg	Williams-Toyota	58	+31.539	9	4
6	3‡	(Brazil) Felipe Massa	Ferrari	58	+39.996	7	3
7	5	(Poland) Robert Kubica	BMW Sauber	58	+46.247	10	2
8	10	(Germany) Timo Glock	Toyota	58	+46.959	13	1
9	4‡	(Finland) Kimi Räikkönen	Ferrari	58	+50.246	6	
10	7	(Spain) Fernando Alonso	Renault	58	+1:02.420	8	
11	6	(Germany) Nick Heidfeld	BMW Sauber	58	+1:04.327	11	
12	17	(Japan) Kazuki Nakajima	Williams-Toyota	58	+1:06.376	12	
13	1‡	(United Kingdom) Lewis Hamilton	McLaren-Mercedes	58	+1:20.454	16	
14	2‡	(Finland) Heikki Kovalainen	McLaren-Mercedes	57	+1 lap	14	
15	12	(Switzerland) Sébastien Buemi	Toro Rosso-Ferrari	57	+1 lap	18	
16	8	(Brazil) Nelson Piquet Jr.	Renault	57	+1 lap	17	
17	20	(Germany) Adrian Sutil	Force India-Mercedes	57	+1 lap	15	
18	11	(France) Sébastien Bourdais	Toro Rosso-Ferrari	57	+1 lap	20	
Ret	23	(Brazil) Rubens Barrichello	Brawn-Mercedes	47	Gearbox	3	
Ret	21	(Italy) Giancarlo Fisichella	Force India-Mercedes	4	Brakes	19	

== Championship standings after the race ==
Drivers' Championship standings

Pos.	Driver	Points
1	(United Kingdom) Jenson Button	61
2	(Brazil) Rubens Barrichello	35
3	(Germany) Sebastian Vettel	29
4	(Australia) Mark Webber	27.5
5	(Italy) Jarno Trulli	19.5

Constructors' Championship standings

Pos.	Constructor	Points
1	(United Kingdom) Brawn-Mercedes	96
2	(Austria) Red Bull-Renault	56.5
3	(Japan) Toyota	32.5
4	(Italy) Ferrari	20
5	(United Kingdom) McLaren-Mercedes	13

- Note: Only the top five positions are included for both sets of standings.

== See also ==
- 2009 Istanbul Park GP2 Series round

Previous race: 2009 Monaco Grand Prix	FIA Formula One World Championship; 2009 season	Next race: 2009 British Grand Prix
Previous race: 2008 Turkish Grand Prix	Turkish Grand Prix	Next race: 2010 Turkish Grand Prix
