= 2011 Turkish Grand Prix =

Race 4 of 19 in the 2011 Formula One World Championship
← Previous race	Next race →

Race details
- Date: 8 May 2011
- Official name: 2011 Formula 1 DHL Turkish Grand Prix
- Location: Istanbul Park, Tuzla, Turkey
- Course: Permanent racing facility
- Course length: 5.338 km (3.317 miles)
- Distance: 58 laps, 309.396 km (192.250 miles)
- Weather: Sunny, Fine and Dry Air Temp 17 °C (63 °F) Track Temp 35 °C (95 °F) dropping to 30 °C (86 °F)
- Attendance: 25,000

Pole position
Driver	(Germany) Sebastian Vettel	Red Bull Racing-Renault
- Time: 1:25.049

Fastest lap
Driver	(Australia) Mark Webber	Red Bull Racing-Renault
- Time: 1:29.703 on lap 48

Podium
First	(Germany) Sebastian Vettel	Red Bull Racing-Renault
Second	(Australia) Mark Webber	Red Bull Racing-Renault
Third	(Spain) Fernando Alonso	Ferrari

The 2011 Turkish Grand Prix, formally the 2011 Formula 1 DHL Turkish Grand Prix, was a Formula One motor race held on 8 May 2011 at Istanbul Park in Tuzla, near Istanbul, Turkey. It was the fourth round of the 2011 Formula One season. The 58-lap race was won by the championship leader, Red Bull Racing's Sebastian Vettel after starting from pole position. His teammate Mark Webber finished in second place, and Ferrari's Fernando Alonso completed the podium in third position.

As a consequence of the race, Vettel extended his lead in the World Drivers' Championship to 34 points over McLaren's Lewis Hamilton, who finished the race in fourth position. Webber's second-place finish moved him into third place in the championship, 4 points behind Hamilton in third, and nine ahead of Jenson Button, who was sixth in Turkey. In the World Constructors' Championship, Red Bull extended their championship advantage to 43 points over McLaren, with Ferrari a further 40 points behind in third position.

It was the last Turkish Grand Prix until 2020, when the COVID-19 pandemic caused disruption to the schedule.

== Report ==
=== Background ===
With Turkey being the first European race of the season, several teams introduced upgrades to their cars in order to aid with their respective performances on the grid. Williams introduced improvements to help with the handling of their car, having suffered a testing start to the season with no points at the first three races. Virgin Racing's aerodynamic updates were bit-part, as only Timo Glock received the package with Jérôme d'Ambrosio's package due to be ready for the Spanish Grand Prix. Hispania Racing set their sights on trying to overhaul Virgin Racing, by introducing updates to their car for the second successive race. Other teams to introduce packages were McLaren, Renault, Ferrari and Mercedes as they all strived to move closer on overall pace to Red Bull Racing, who were confident that they had rectified the KERS problems that had hampered their performance over the first few races.

Several teams made driver changes for the first practice session. Nico Hülkenberg substituted for Adrian Sutil at Force India, while Daniel Ricciardo drove in the place of Jaime Alguersuari at Scuderia Toro Rosso. Karun Chandhok took part once again, replacing Heikki Kovalainen at Lotus.

Tyre supplier Pirelli brought its silver-banded hard compound tyre as the harder "prime" tyre and the yellow-banded soft compound as the softer "option" compound. This was the same tyre selection that Bridgestone had chosen to bring to the Turkish Grand Prix for the past two years. They also changed the design of their tyres. From now on they carry new and more prominent colour markings on the sidewalls.

Before the race, Sebastian Vettel led the World Drivers' Championship with 68 points, 21 ahead of his nearest rival at the time - Lewis Hamilton - who was on 47 points. Hamilton had cut Vettel's lead from 24 to 21 points after winning his first race of the year, and also the first Vettel did not win, in China. Jenson Button was third in the standings with 38 points, 1 ahead of Mark Webber who had scored his first podium of the year when he drove from 18th to 3rd in China, three weeks previously. Fernando Alonso's Ferrari was still relatively slow compared to what it would be later in the year - and Ferrari hadn't been on the podium yet - he was fifth in the standings with just 26 points, 2 ahead of teammate Massa.

Red Bull Racing were the only team over 100 points and therefore lead the Constructors' Championship on 105. McLaren were the only other team to have a podium at all three races and were in second place on 85 points. Ferrari had less than half of Red Bull on 50 points, but were still in third place. Renault and Mercedes GP were fourth and fifth with 32 and 16 points respectively.

=== Free practice ===
The opening session was run in wet conditions – the first competitive session in which Pirelli's wet weather tyres had been used in the season – where Ferrari's Fernando Alonso was quickest by 1.4 seconds ahead of the Mercedes cars of Nico Rosberg and Michael Schumacher in second and third places respectively, with the only other drivers within two seconds of Alonso being the Renaults of Nick Heidfeld and Vitaly Petrov, and Kamui Kobayashi's Sauber. However, due to the conditions, many teams opted for conservative running with McLaren running the fewest laps; their pairing of Jenson Button and Lewis Hamilton completing five laps between them. Championship leader Sebastian Vettel caused a red flag during the session after spinning into the barrier; he put his right-rear wheel over the kerb at the exit of Turn 8 and thus ended the session – as well as his day's running – in 17th place.

The second session was held in drying conditions, where Button was marginally quickest ahead of Rosberg, the only drivers to record a sub-1:27 lap time. After sitting out the first session save for an exploratory lap, Hamilton ran 31 laps in the second session and finished third ahead of Schumacher and Mark Webber, who ran mainly long-distance stints during the session. Morning pacesetter Alonso was eleventh after a hydraulic problem limited track running, while on track, he had a spin at Turn 6. Pastor Maldonado crashed his Williams into the barrier, having run wide on the exit of Turn 8, and spun out on a damp patch. Virgin Racing's Jérôme d'Ambrosio later received a five-place grid penalty for ignoring yellow flags in the area of Maldonado's accident.

The third session saw the top four places taken by the Red Bull and Mercedes cars; Vettel finishing as the fastest driver ahead of Schumacher by 0.001 seconds. Webber was almost four tenths adrift in third, just edging out Rosberg in fourth, after recovering from a high-speed spin at Turn 8 during the session, while McLaren wound up fifth and sixth with Button getting the better of Hamilton.

=== Qualifying ===
The first session started with Kamui Kobayashi having a mechanical fault on his first flying lap, meaning that he was unable to post a qualifying time, but the race stewards ultimately decided to allow him to take part in the race. By the end of the session, both Lotuses were eliminated, with Heikki Kovalainen ending the session half a second behind Rubens Barrichello's Williams, who had been 17th. D'Ambrosio outqualified his teammate Glock on-track but with his grid penalty, he would start the race from last place. Vitantonio Liuzzi also outqualified Glock, with Narain Karthikeyan recording the slowest time, 1.7 seconds within the 107% benchmark.

The second session saw Vettel return to the top of the timesheets, recording the first instance of a sub-1:26 lap time all weekend. Rosberg also broke into the 1:25s as he ended the second part in second place ahead of Hamilton and Webber. A late lap from Nick Heidfeld saw him qualify for the final session at the expense of Rubens Barrichello. Adrian Sutil outqualified his Force India teammate Paul di Resta as they ended the session in twelfth and thirteenth places, with di Resta escaping a penalty for missing the weighbridge. Maldonado and Sergio Pérez were next on the grid ahead of the Toro Rosso pair, with Sébastien Buemi getting the better of Jaime Alguersuari by three tenths.

The third period saw the Red Bull cars only attempt a single run at the start of the session, in order to save tyres for the race, with Vettel ending the session over four tenths of a second clear from Webber; it was Vettel's fifth consecutive pole, the first driver to record five in succession since Fernando Alonso did so in 2006. Rosberg finished third, moving ahead of Lewis Hamilton on his final run, with Alonso in fifth having not improved on his first run time. Jenson Button qualified in sixth place for McLaren, followed by Vitaly Petrov in the Renault and Schumacher in the second Mercedes in eighth. Heidfeld and Felipe Massa completed the top ten, with Massa failing to record a time, abandoning his only run in Q3 due to a mistake and elected to save tyres for the race.

=== Race ===
All the drivers started except for Timo Glock, who lost fifth gear prior to the race. Sebastian Vettel led the race from the start, with a lead of 6 seconds by the time he took his first pitstop on lap 10. Behind him there were battles, with Fernando Alonso and Mark Webber fighting for second place in the closing laps, the victory falling to Webber giving Red Bull a one-two result. Behind Webber and Alonso, Hamilton and Button fought for fourth place, with Hamilton getting the upper hand, and Nico Rosberg later slipping in between the pair, taking fifth from Button when Button's tyres were degrading massively on the last stint. Paul di Resta made a bad pit exit with a loose wheel, and retired from the race.

The race, which had the most pitstops for a Grand Prix race ever (over 80) and the most overtaking moves since 1983, extended Sebastian Vettel's lead in the world championship standings to 93 points to second placed Hamilton's 59. In the constructors' standings, Red Bull increased their tally to 148 points to McLaren's 105, with Ferrari in third place with 65.

== Classification ==
=== Qualifying ===
Pos	No	Driver	Constructor	Part 1	Part 2	Part 3	Grid
1	1	(Germany) Sebastian Vettel	Red Bull Racing-Renault	1:27.039	1:25.610	1:25.049	1
2	2	(Australia) Mark Webber	Red Bull Racing-Renault	1:27.090	1:26.075	1:25.454	2
3	8	(Germany) Nico Rosberg	Mercedes	1:27.514	1:25.801	1:25.574	3
4	3	(United Kingdom) Lewis Hamilton	McLaren-Mercedes	1:27.091	1:26.066	1:25.595	4
5	5	(Spain) Fernando Alonso	Ferrari	1:27.349	1:26.152	1:25.851	5
6	4	(United Kingdom) Jenson Button	McLaren-Mercedes	1:27.374	1:26.485	1:25.982	6
7	10	(Russia) Vitaly Petrov	Renault	1:27.475	1:26.654	1:26.296	7
8	7	(Germany) Michael Schumacher	Mercedes	1:27.697	1:26.121	1:26.646	8
9	9	(Germany) Nick Heidfeld	Renault	1:27.901	1:26.740	1:26.659	9
10	6	(Brazil) Felipe Massa	Ferrari	1:27.013	1:26.395	No time^{1}	10
11	11	(Brazil) Rubens Barrichello	Williams-Cosworth	1:28.246	1:26.764		11
12	14	(Germany) Adrian Sutil	Force India-Mercedes	1:27.392	1:27.027		12
13	15	(United Kingdom) Paul di Resta	Force India-Mercedes	1:27.625	1:27.145		13
14	12	(Venezuela) Pastor Maldonado	Williams-Cosworth	1:27.396	1:27.236		14
15	17	(Mexico) Sergio Pérez	Sauber-Ferrari	1:27.778	1:27.244		15
16	18	(Switzerland) Sébastien Buemi	Toro Rosso-Ferrari	1:27.620	1:27.255		16
17	19	(Spain) Jaime Alguersuari	Toro Rosso-Ferrari	1:28.055	1:27.572		17
18	20	(Finland) Heikki Kovalainen	Lotus-Renault	1:28.780			18
19	21	(Italy) Jarno Trulli	Lotus-Renault	1:29.673			19
20	25	(Belgium) Jérôme d'Ambrosio	Virgin-Cosworth	1:30.445			23^{2}
21	23	(Italy) Vitantonio Liuzzi	HRT-Cosworth	1:30.692			20
22	24	(Germany) Timo Glock	Virgin-Cosworth	1:30.813			21
23	22	(India) Narain Karthikeyan	HRT-Cosworth	1:31.564			22
107% time: 1:33.103
24	16	(Japan) Kamui Kobayashi	Sauber-Ferrari	No time^{3}			24

Notes

- ^1 – Felipe Massa did not set a lap time in Q3, as she was saving her tires for the race.
- ^2 – Jérôme d'Ambrosio was given a five-place grid penalty, for ignoring yellow flags in the area of Pastor Maldonado's accident in the second free practice session.
- ^3 – Kamui Kobayashi failed to set a time in qualifying after experiencing problems with his fuel pump. However, he was permitted to take part in the race because he had consistently demonstrated lap times that were well within the 107% margin during free practice.

=== Race ===
Pos	No	Driver	Constructor	Laps	Time/Retired	Grid	Points
1	1	(Germany) Sebastian Vettel	Red Bull Racing-Renault	58	1:30:17.558	1	25
2	2	(Australia) Mark Webber	Red Bull Racing-Renault	58	+8.807	2	18
3	5	(Spain) Fernando Alonso	Ferrari	58	+10.075	5	15
4	3	(United Kingdom) Lewis Hamilton	McLaren-Mercedes	58	+40.232	4	12
5	8	(Germany) Nico Rosberg	Mercedes	58	+47.539	3	10
6	4	(United Kingdom) Jenson Button	McLaren-Mercedes	58	+59.431	6	8
7	9	(Germany) Nick Heidfeld	Renault	58	+1:00.857	9	6
8	10	(Russia) Vitaly Petrov	Renault	58	+1:08.168	7	4
9	18	(Switzerland) Sébastien Buemi	Toro Rosso-Ferrari	58	+1:09.394	16	2
10	16	(Japan) Kamui Kobayashi	Sauber-Ferrari	58	+1:18.021	24	1
11	6	(Brazil) Felipe Massa	Ferrari	58	+1:19.823	10	
12	7	(Germany) Michael Schumacher	Mercedes	58	+1:25.444	8	
13	14	(Germany) Adrian Sutil	Force India-Mercedes	57	+1 Lap	12	
14	17	(Mexico) Sergio Pérez	Sauber-Ferrari	57	+1 Lap	15	
15	11	(Brazil) Rubens Barrichello	Williams-Cosworth	57	+1 Lap	11	
16	19	(Spain) Jaime Alguersuari	Toro Rosso-Ferrari	57	+1 Lap	17	
17	12	(Venezuela) Pastor Maldonado	Williams-Cosworth	57	+1 Lap	14	
18	21	(Italy) Jarno Trulli	Lotus-Renault	57	+1 Lap	19	
19	20	(Finland) Heikki Kovalainen	Lotus-Renault	56	+2 Laps	18	
20	25	(Belgium) Jérôme d'Ambrosio	Virgin-Cosworth	56	+2 Laps	23	
21	22	(India) Narain Karthikeyan	HRT-Cosworth	55	+3 Laps	22	
22	23	(Italy) Vitantonio Liuzzi	HRT-Cosworth	53	+5 Laps	20	
Ret	15	(United Kingdom) Paul di Resta	Force India-Mercedes	44	Wheel	13	
DNS	24	(Germany) Timo Glock	Virgin-Cosworth	0	Gearbox	21	

== Championship standings after the race ==
Drivers' Championship standings

	Pos.	Driver	Points
	1	(Germany) Sebastian Vettel	93
	2	(United Kingdom) Lewis Hamilton	59
1	3	(Australia) Mark Webber	55
1	4	(United Kingdom) Jenson Button	46
	5	(Spain) Fernando Alonso	41

Constructors' Championship standings

Pos.	Constructor	Points
1	(Austria) Red Bull Racing-Renault	148
2	(United Kingdom) McLaren-Mercedes	105
3	(Italy) Ferrari	65
4	(United Kingdom) Renault	42
5	(Germany) Mercedes	26

- Note: Only the top five positions are included for both sets of standings.

== See also ==
- 2011 Istanbul Park GP2 Series round
- 2011 Istanbul Park GP3 Series round

Previous race: 2011 Chinese Grand Prix	FIA Formula One World Championship; 2011 season	Next race: 2011 Spanish Grand Prix
Previous race: 2010 Turkish Grand Prix	Turkish Grand Prix	Next race: 2020 Turkish Grand Prix
