= 2006 Turkish Grand Prix =

Coordinates: 40°57′20.5″N 29°24′29.7″E

Race 14 of 18 in the 2006 Formula One World Championship
← Previous race	Next race →
- Istanbul Park

Race details
- Date: 27 August 2006
- Official name: 2006 Formula 1 Petrol Ofisi Turkish Grand Prix
- Location: Istanbul Racing Circuit, Tuzla, Turkey
- Course: Permanent racing facility
- Course length: 5.338 km (3.317 miles)
- Distance: 58 laps, 309.356 km (192.225 miles)
- Weather: Sunny, hot

Pole position
Driver	(Brazil) Felipe Massa	Ferrari
- Time: 1:26.907

Fastest lap
Driver	(Germany) Michael Schumacher	Ferrari
- Time: 1:28.005 on lap 55

Podium
First	(Brazil) Felipe Massa	Ferrari
Second	(Spain) Fernando Alonso	Renault
Third	(Germany) Michael Schumacher	Ferrari

The 2006 Turkish Grand Prix (officially the 2006 Formula 1 Petrol Ofisi Turkish Grand Prix) was a Formula One motor race, held on 27 August 2006. The 58-lap race, which was the fourteenth round of the 2006 Formula One season, and the second Turkish Grand Prix, was held at Istanbul Park in Tuzla, Turkey. Felipe Massa, driving for the Ferrari team, took his first pole position, and then his first race victory. Fernando Alonso, who drove for Renault finished the race in second position and Massa's teammate Michael Schumacher occupied the final position on the podium. The race was also the first Grand Prix meeting for future quadruple world champion Sebastian Vettel, who was assigned a Friday test driver role for the BMW Sauber team. Vettel received a $1,000 fine for speeding in the pit-lane only 6 seconds after he got out onto the track.

As a consequence of the race, Fernando Alonso extended his lead in the Drivers' Championship to 12 points from Michael Schumacher. With victory, Felipe Massa retained third place in the standings, and despite closing the gap between himself and Schumacher to 34 points, it was still near impossible for him to surpass his teammate's points total. In the Constructors' Championship, Ferrari closed the gap to leaders Renault to just two points. McLaren remained in third position, 69 points behind the top two teams.

This race also marked 200th Grand Prix races for McLaren and Mercedes engine partnership since 1995.

== Report ==
=== Background ===
Prior to the Grand Prix weekend, Renault's Fernando Alonso led the Formula One World Drivers' Championship on 100 points. He held a ten-point lead over his main rival Michael Schumacher, despite retiring from the preceding race in Hungary. Ferrari teammates, Schumacher and Felipe Massa lay second and third in the standings on 90 and 52 points respectively, ahead of the second Renault of Giancarlo Fisichella and the McLaren of Kimi Räikkönen, both on 49 points.

Renault led the Constructors' Championship with 149 points, seven clear of Ferrari, while McLaren were in third position with 89 points. They were ahead of Honda F1, who sat in fourth with 52 after picking up their first and to be only victory since their return, three weeks before in Hungary. BMW Sauber completed the top five with 26 points.

=== Friday drivers ===
The bottom 6 teams in the 2005 Constructors' Championship and Super Aguri were entitled to run a third car in free practice on Friday. These drivers drove on Friday but did not compete in qualifying or the race.

Constructor	Nat	Driver
(United Kingdom) Williams-Cosworth	(Austria)	Alexander Wurz
(Japan) Honda	(United Kingdom)	Anthony Davidson
(Austria) Red Bull-Ferrari	(Netherlands)	Robert Doornbos
(Germany) BMW Sauber	(Germany)	Sebastian Vettel
(Russia) MF1-Toyota	(Switzerland)	Giorgio Mondini
(Italy) Toro Rosso-Cosworth	(Switzerland)	Neel Jani
(Japan) Super Aguri-Honda	(France)	Franck Montagny

=== Practice and qualifying ===
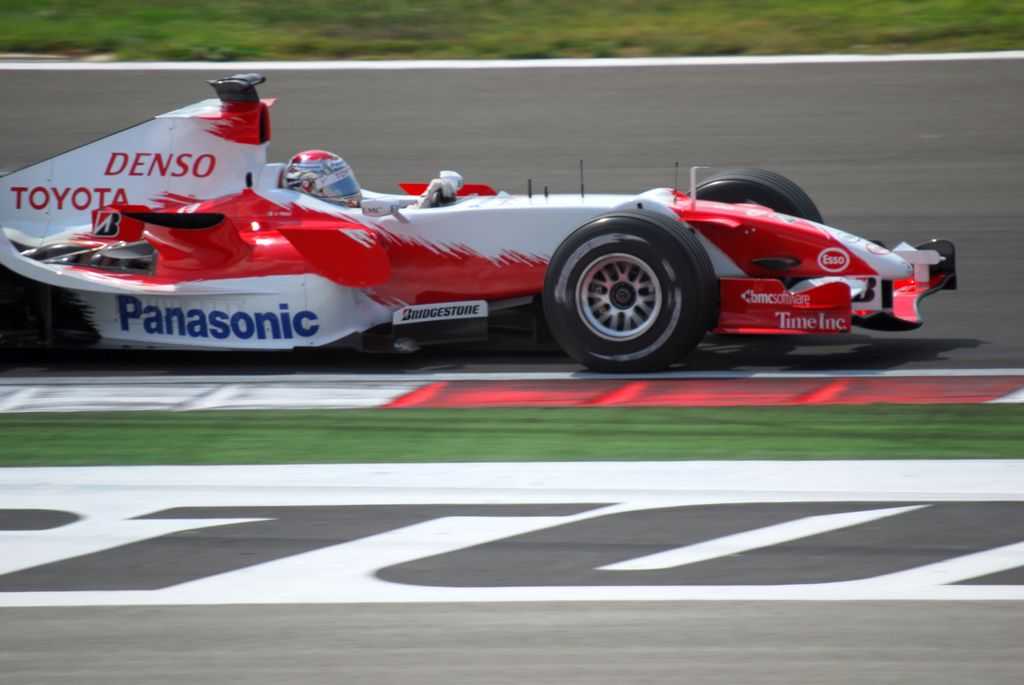
Jarno Trulli qualified thirteenth, but started in twelfth because of his teammate's ten place grid penalty.

Kimi Räikkönen set the fastest time in the first free practice session, despite only completing five laps; ahead of Michael Schumacher and Jenson Button, who were both just within half a second of Räikkönen's time. In the bottom half of the order, Felipe Massa finished the session 17th and Fernando Alonso 23rd. Neither of the Williams left the garage during the session. Sebastian Vettel impressed many as he set the fastest time in the second free practice session, on his first Grand Prix weekend appearance.

The following day in qualifying, however, it was Felipe Massa who set the fastest time, taking the first pole position of his career, ahead of Schumacher by one tenth of a second. The two Renaults occupied the next row with Alonso in front of Fisichella again. Fifth spot was initially taken up by Ralf Schumacher's Toyota, before he was demoted to fifteenth for a gearbox change. This was also true for Christijan Albers, who was taken from a good sixteenth place qualifying for the Midland team, to the back of the grid. Only four hundredths of a second separated Nick Heidfeld, Button and Räikkönen qualified from sixth to eighth before all moving up a place after Ralf Schumacher's penalty. Robert Kubica and Mark Webber completed the top ten fastest times, with Christian Klien completing the top ten on the starting grid.

=== Race ===
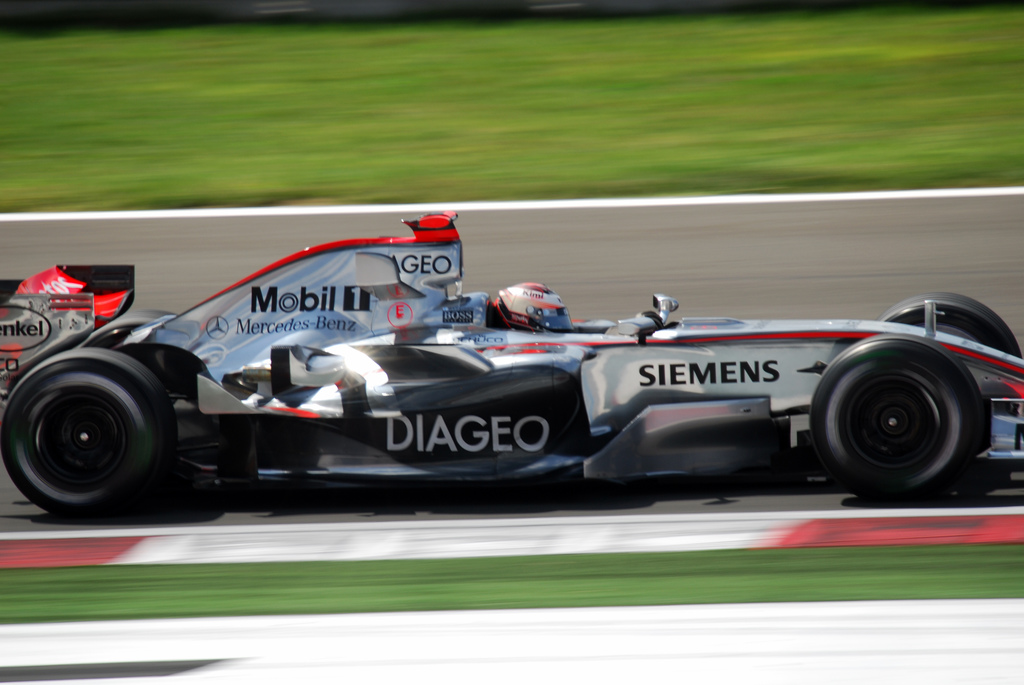
Kimi Räikkönen retired early due to collision damage.

The start of the race was affected by a multi-car accident entering the first corner. Massa, Michael Schumacher, Alonso and Fisichella all battled for position entering the first corner, with Fisichella spinning, causing a chain reaction behind him. During the chain reaction, Scott Speed collided with the McLaren of Räikkönen, causing one of Räikkönen's rear tyres to puncture. Räikkönen pitted for a new set of tyres, but soon faced a similar problem due to damaged bodywork; because of this he went straight off the outside of turn 4 and into a barrier, on the next lap. Nick Heidfeld, Fisichella, Speed and Ralf Schumacher all needed repairs from the incident, and the Midland of Tiago Monteiro was forced to retire.

On lap 13, Vitantonio Liuzzi, who had climbed to seventh place, lost control entering the first turn and spun, stalling the engine. The car was left stranded on the racing line at the exit of the corner, and the Safety Car was deployed. Massa, Schumacher, Alonso, Button, Kubica and Webber all came in to make pit stops whilst the Safety Car circulated. The first four drivers stayed at the front, but Webber and Kubica dropped to near the back of the pack. Alonso, however, was able to jump Schumacher, as his title rival was forced to 'stack' behind Massa before the mechanics could set to work on his car. The final 15 laps of the race were focused on Alonso and Michael Schumacher, who fought for second place behind Massa as part of their championship battle. Schumacher pursued Alonso for the last laps, but was unable to catch Alonso until the final corners of the final lap. Schumacher was right on the gearbox of Alonso exiting the last corner, but did not get past.

Thus, Massa took his first career Formula One victory, making it the second Grand Prix in a row with a first-time winner, following Button's win in Hungary three weeks earlier. It was the first time this had happened since 2003, when Räikkönen and Fisichella won their first victories at the consecutive Malaysian and Brazilian Grands Prix. Drivers' Championship rivals Alonso and Schumacher completed the podium. Button, de la Rosa, Fisichella, Ralf Schumacher and Rubens Barrichello completed the points-scorers and the cars on the lead lap.

=== Post-race ===
The podium display after the race caused controversy when winner Felipe Massa received the trophy from Mehmet Ali Talat, who was referred to as the president of the Turkish Republic of Northern Cyprus. This breakaway area of the island of Cyprus is only recognized by Turkey. The government of the Republic of Cyprus filed an official complaint with the FIA, the body governing the Formula One world championship. After investigating the incident, the FIA fined the organizers of the Grand Prix $5 million on 19 September 2006.

== Classification ==
=== Qualifying ===
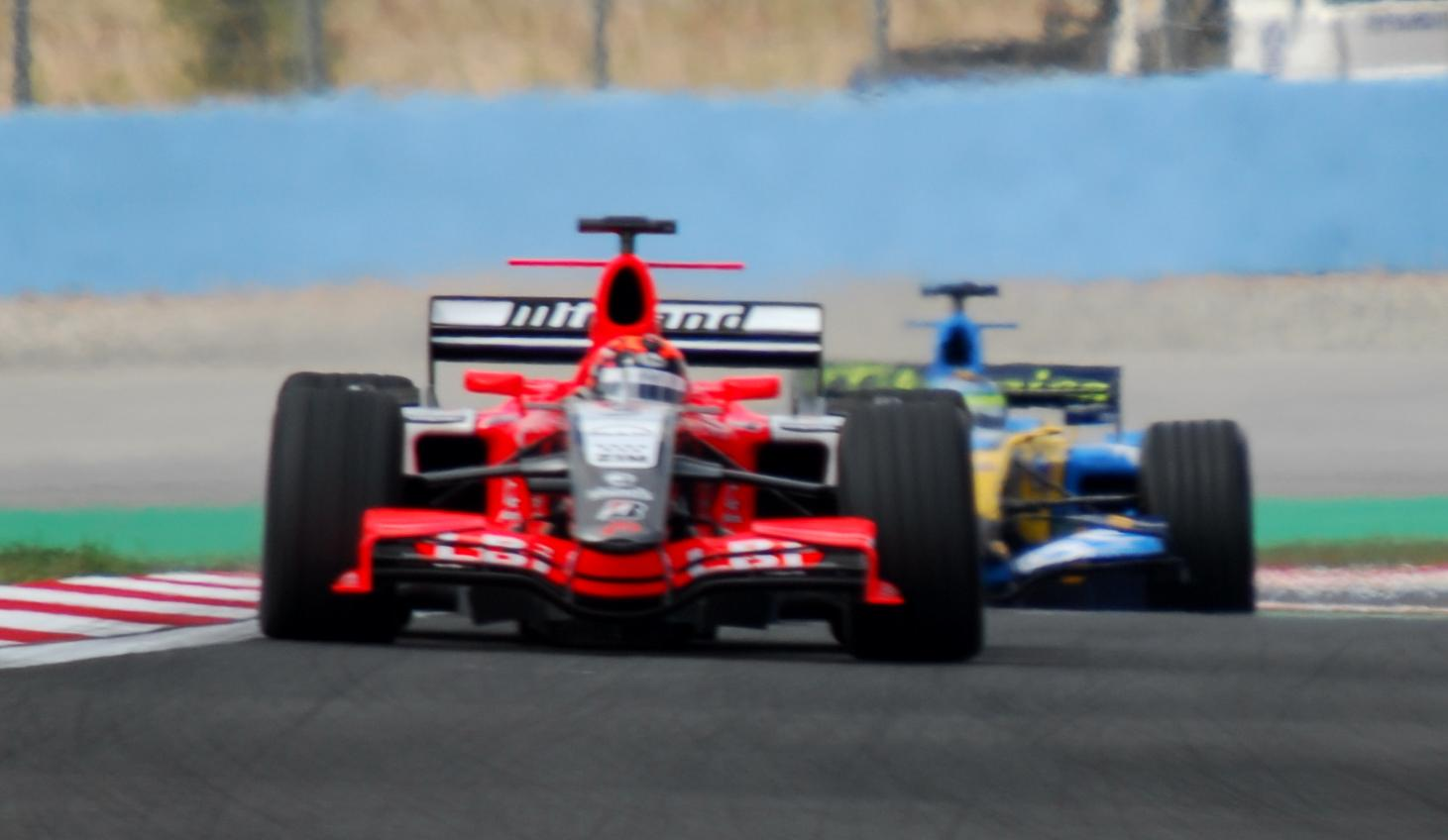
Christijan Albers was demoted ten places for an engine change.

Pos.	No.	Driver	Constructor	Q1	Q2	Q3	Grid
1	6	(Brazil) Felipe Massa	Ferrari	1:27.306	1:27.059	1:26.907	1
2	5	(Germany) Michael Schumacher	Ferrari	1:27.385	1:25.850	1:27.284	2
3	1	(Spain) Fernando Alonso	Renault	1:27.861	1:26.917	1:27.321	3
4	2	(Italy) Giancarlo Fisichella	Renault	1:28.175	1:27.346	1:27.564	4
5	7	(Germany) Ralf Schumacher	Toyota	1:27.668	1:27.062	1:27.569	15^{1}
6	16	(Germany) Nick Heidfeld	BMW Sauber	1:28.200	1:27.251	1:27.785	5
7	12	(United Kingdom) Jenson Button	Honda	1:28.222	1:26.872	1:27.790	6
8	3	(Finland) Kimi Räikkönen	McLaren-Mercedes	1:28.236	1:27.202	1:27.866	7
9	17	(Poland) Robert Kubica	BMW Sauber	1:28.212	1:27.405	1:28.167	8
10	9	(Australia) Mark Webber	Williams-Cosworth	1:28.307	1:27.608	1:29.436	9
11	15	(Austria) Christian Klien	Red Bull-Ferrari	1:28.271	1:27.852		10
12	4	(Spain) Pedro de la Rosa	McLaren-Mercedes	1:28.403	1:27.897		11
13	8	(Italy) Jarno Trulli	Toyota	1:28.549	1:27.973		12
14	11	(Brazil) Rubens Barrichello	Honda	1:28.411	1:28.257		13
15	10	(Germany) Nico Rosberg	Williams-Cosworth	1:28.889	1:28.386		14
16	19	(Netherlands) Christijan Albers	MF1-Toyota	1:29.021	1:28.639		22^{1}
17	14	(United Kingdom) David Coulthard	Red Bull-Ferrari	1:29.136			16
18	21	(United States) Scott Speed	Toro Rosso-Cosworth	1:29.158			17
19	20	(Italy) Vitantonio Liuzzi	Toro Rosso-Cosworth	1:29.250			18
20	18	(Portugal) Tiago Monteiro	MF1-Toyota	1:29.901			19
21	23	(Japan) Sakon Yamamoto	Super Aguri-Honda	1:30.607			20
22	22	(Japan) Takuma Sato	Super Aguri-Honda	1:30.850			21

Notes

- ^1 – Ralf Schumacher and Christijan Albers both received 10 place grid penalties due to engine changes.

=== Race ===
Pos.	No.	Driver	Constructor	Tyre	Laps	Time/Retired	Grid	Points
1	6	(Brazil) Felipe Massa	Ferrari	B	58	1:28:51.082	1	10
2	1	(Spain) Fernando Alonso	Renault	MI	58	+5.575	3	8
3	5	(Germany) Michael Schumacher	Ferrari	B	58	+5.656	2	6
4	12	(United Kingdom) Jenson Button	Honda	MI	58	+12.334	6	5
5	4	(Spain) Pedro de la Rosa	McLaren-Mercedes	MI	58	+45.908	11	4
6	2	(Italy) Giancarlo Fisichella	Renault	MI	58	+46.594	4	3
7	7	(Germany) Ralf Schumacher	Toyota	B	58	+59.337	15	2
8	11	(Brazil) Rubens Barrichello	Honda	MI	58	+1:00.034	13	1
9	8	(Italy) Jarno Trulli	Toyota	B	57	+1 lap	12	
10	9	(Australia) Mark Webber	Williams-Cosworth	B	57	+1 lap	9	
11	15	(Austria) Christian Klien	Red Bull-Ferrari	MI	57	+1 lap	10	
12	17	(Poland) Robert Kubica	BMW Sauber	MI	57	+1 lap	8	
13	21	(United States) Scott Speed	Toro Rosso-Cosworth	MI	57	+1 lap	17	
14	16	(Germany) Nick Heidfeld	BMW Sauber	MI	56	+2 laps	5	
15	14	(United Kingdom) David Coulthard	Red Bull-Ferrari	MI	55	Gearbox	16	
Ret	19	(Netherlands) Christijan Albers	MF1-Toyota	B	46	Spin	22	
NC	22	(Japan) Takuma Sato	Super Aguri-Honda	B	41	+17 laps	21	
Ret	10	(Germany) Nico Rosberg	Williams-Cosworth	B	25	Water leak	14	
Ret	23	(Japan) Sakon Yamamoto	Super Aguri-Honda	B	23	Spin	20	
Ret	20	(Italy) Vitantonio Liuzzi	Toro Rosso-Cosworth	MI	12	Spin	18	
Ret	3	(Finland) Kimi Räikkönen	McLaren-Mercedes	MI	1	Accident	7	
Ret	18	(Portugal) Tiago Monteiro	MF1-Toyota	B	0	Collision	19	

==== Notes ====
- David Coulthard was classified and Takuma Sato was not classified as Coulthard finished more than 90% of the race while Sato did not.

== Championship standings after the race ==
Drivers' Championship standings
Pos.	Driver	Points
1	(Spain) Fernando Alonso*	108
2	(Germany) Michael Schumacher*	96
3	(Brazil) Felipe Massa	62
4	(Italy) Giancarlo Fisichella	52
5	(Finland) Kimi Räikkönen	49

Constructors' Championship standings
	Pos.	Constructor	Points
	1	(France) Renault*	160
	2	(Italy) Ferrari*	158
	3	(United Kingdom) McLaren-Mercedes*	89
	4	(Japan) Honda	58
1	5	(Japan) Toyota	28

- Note: Only the top five positions are included for both sets of standings.
- Bold text and an asterisk indicates competitors who still had a theoretical chance of becoming World Champion.

== See also ==
- 2006 Istanbul Park GP2 Series round

Previous race: 2006 Hungarian Grand Prix	FIA Formula One World Championship; 2006 season	Next race: 2006 Italian Grand Prix
Previous race: 2005 Turkish Grand Prix	Turkish Grand Prix	Next race: 2007 Turkish Grand Prix
