= Simon Roberts (Formula One) =

Motorsports engineer and team manager

- Born: 27 September 1962 (age 63)
- Citizenship: British

Simon Roberts (born 27 September 1962) is an engineer who has held management positions with Formula One teams McLaren, Force India and Williams.

== Career ==
Roberts studied mechanical engineering at the University of Manchester, before being employed at Perkins Engines diesel and gas company in Peterborough. He then became head of production engineering for the company before transferring to Rover Car, where he was director of the powertrain division and supervised the company's acquisition by BMW in 1994, after which Roberts oversaw the transmission and suspension operations of the company in the UK until 2000, when he decided to move to Alstom as chief operating officer whose role is to supervise the development of the Pendolino pendulum train project. This went into operation in 2001 and Roberts became the company's industrial director before deciding to transfer to McLaren in September 2003 as general manager, being responsible for coordinating the manufacturing and assembly process for the test and race team. He then became director of operations for the team in 2004.

In 2009, he was hired by the Force India team as its chief operating officer for the 2009 season. But on 15 October 2009, Force India announced that Otmar Szafnauer would move to the position of chief operating officer for the team while Roberts returned to his job at McLaren in the 2010 season. In 2017, he was appointed director of operations at McLaren during a managerial reshuffle, with him now being responsible for track and factory operations.

In June 2020, Roberts became the managing director of Williams. However, after Claire Williams left the Williams team, he was appointed as their interim Team Principal. On 17 December it announced that Roberts was to be made the permanent Team Principal of Williams Racing. On 9 June 2021 it was announced that Simon Roberts would be leaving the team, and his replacement would be CEO Jost Capito.
