= Spyker F8-VII =

Formula One racing car

Spyker F8-VII Spyker F8-VIIB Force India VJM01
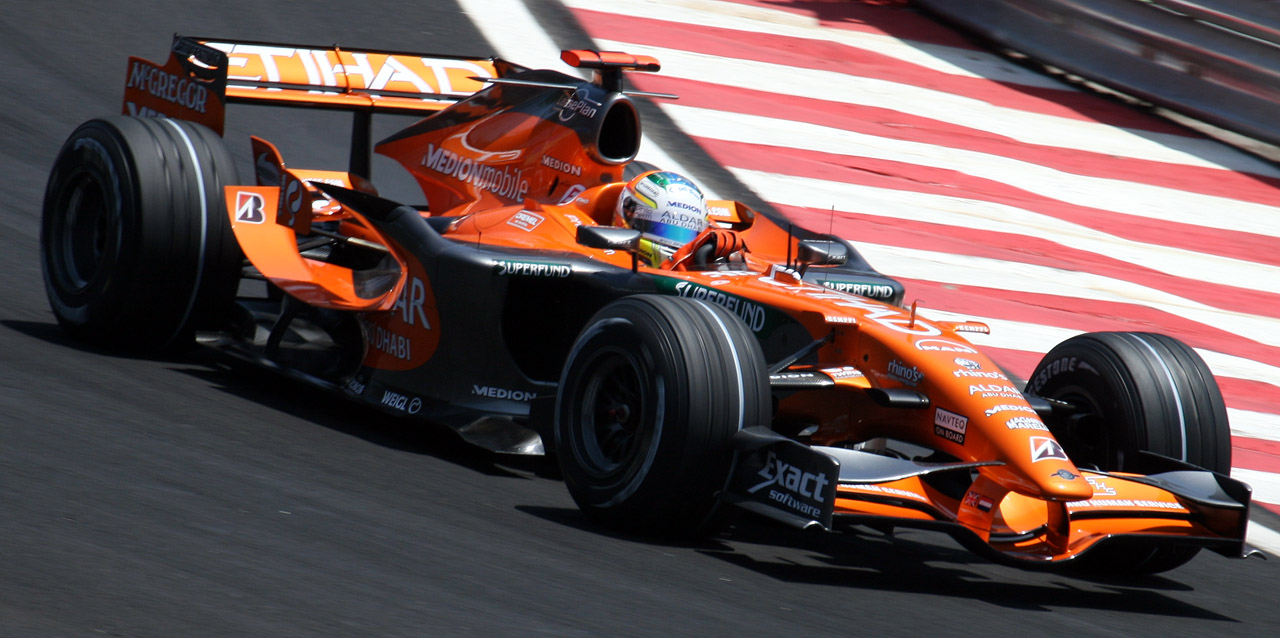
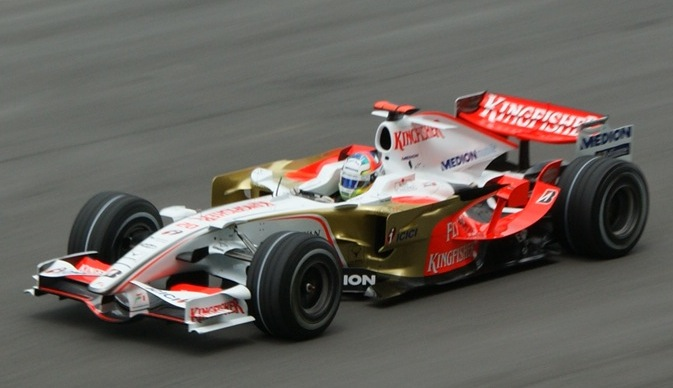
- The Spyker F8-VII (top) and the Force India VJM-01 (bottom)
- Category: Formula One
- Constructor: Spyker/Force India
- Designers: Mike Gascoyne (Chief Technical Officer); James Key (Technical Director); Mark Smith (Design Director); John McQuilliam (Chief Designer); Mike Wroe (Head of Electronics); Simon Phillips (Head of Aerodynamics)
- Predecessor: Midland M16
- Successor: Force India VJM02

Technical specifications
- Chassis: Carbon-fibre and honeycomb composite monocoque
- Suspension (front): Unequal length composite wishbones
- Suspension (rear): Unequal length composite wishbones
- Length: 4,790 mm (189 in)
- Width: 1,800 mm (71 in)
- Height: 950 mm (37 in)
- Axle track: Front: 1,480 mm (58 in); Rear: 1,418 mm (56 in)
- Wheelbase: More than 3,000 mm (118 in)
- Engine: Ferrari 056 2006-spec (2007); Ferrari 056 2007-spec (2008) 2,398 cc (146 cu in) V8, naturally aspirated, mid-engine, longitudinally mounted
- Transmission: Spyker/Ferrari 7 forward + 1 reverse Longitudinal with electrohydraulic sequential gear change
- Power: 750 hp (559 kW) @ 17000 rpm
- Fuel: Shell V-Power
- Tyres: Bridgestone Potenza

Competition history
- Notable entrants: (Netherlands) Etihad Aldar Spyker F1 Team (2007); Force India F1 Team (2008)
- Notable drivers: 20. (Germany) Adrian Sutil; 21. (Netherlands) Christijan Albers; 21. (Germany) Markus Winkelhock; 21. (Japan) Sakon Yamamoto; 21. (Italy) Giancarlo Fisichella
- Debut: 2007 Australian Grand Prix
- Last event: 2007 Brazilian Grand Prix (F8-VII); 2008 Brazilian Grand Prix (VJM01)
| Races | Wins | Podiums | Poles | F/Laps |
|---|---|---|---|---|
| 35 | 0 | 0 | 0 | 0 |

The Spyker F8-VII (subsequently known as the Force India VJM01) was a Formula One car, constructed by Spyker F1 that competed in the 2007 Formula One World Championship. A "B Specification" car named the Spyker F8-VIIB was launched at the Italian Grand Prix and used for the remainder of the 2007 season. The engine of Spyker F8-VII car was Ferrari 056 despite the team opted for 2006-spec engine due to cost reasons. For the 2008 World Championship, Force India used a slightly modified version of the F8-VIIB, called the Force India VJM01 named after team owners Vijay Mallya, Jan Mol and Michiel Mol. The VJM01 used 2007-spec Ferrari 056 engines instead of 2008-spec.

The F8-VII was the only car constructed by Spyker F1 in their own right after their take-over from the struggling Midland F1 team part way through 2006.

== Overview ==
=== Design ===
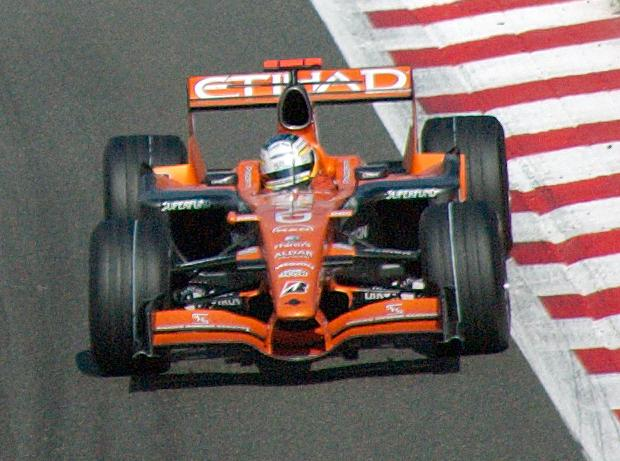
Sutil driving the F8-VIIB at the 2007 Belgian Grand Prix.

The F8-VII was described by the team as a solid base on which to build, as they had a relatively short period of time to produce the new F1 car. James Key, the technical director of Spyker F1, said, "We also tried to second guess as best we could what the 2007 tyres were going to do, and we worked hard on aero, which is of course always the fundamental thing. That way we could concentrate all our efforts on performance related areas."

The car was not competitive and scored only one point.

Remarkably for an unsuccessful car, in his only ever race, Marcus Winkelhock started last at the European Grand Prix at the Nürburgring but after getting his tactics right at the start of the wet race (by changing tyres after the warm up lap), Winkelhock found himself leading the race with a 33-second lead after just two laps due to most of the field either pitting for wet tyres or spinning off. The race was stopped due to the dangerous conditions. Winkelhock officially led the race for 7 laps but as the conditions improved following the restart, he slid down the field in his uncompetitive car and eventually retired after 15 laps.

=== Naming ===
Going against the trend originally started by Jordan Grand Prix and continued by Midland F1, the new car's naming designation relates directly to Spyker's heritage as a car and aircraft manufacturer. When the Dutch company started trading at the beginning of the 20th century it launched car models named A, B and C. When Spyker CEO Victor Muller resurrected the Spyker name in 2000 he wanted to build on that strong history.

"When we launched the first modern line of Spykers, the C8 Spyder, we called it the C line to follow on from the original model rationale," he explained. "The E line will be launched in the near future, so it makes sense for our Formula One car, our latest model, to be the F line."

The number eight refers to the number of cylinders of Spyker's Ferrari engine – the same rationale as used with road-going Spykers. The VII (7) sub-designation refers to Spyker's days as an aircraft manufacturer where all models were denoted by Roman numerals and stood for the year the aircraft was launched. Hence the F8-VII is the Spyker F line with eight cylinders in 2007.

=== B Specification car ===
A "B Specification" car was launched midway into the 2007 season. The F8-VIIB's debut was initially planned for the Turkish Grand Prix, but was delayed to the Italian Grand Prix after the car failed the mandatory FIA crash testing programme. Adrian Sutil subsequently scored Spyker's one and only point in the Japanese Grand Prix at the wheel of the F8-VIIB.

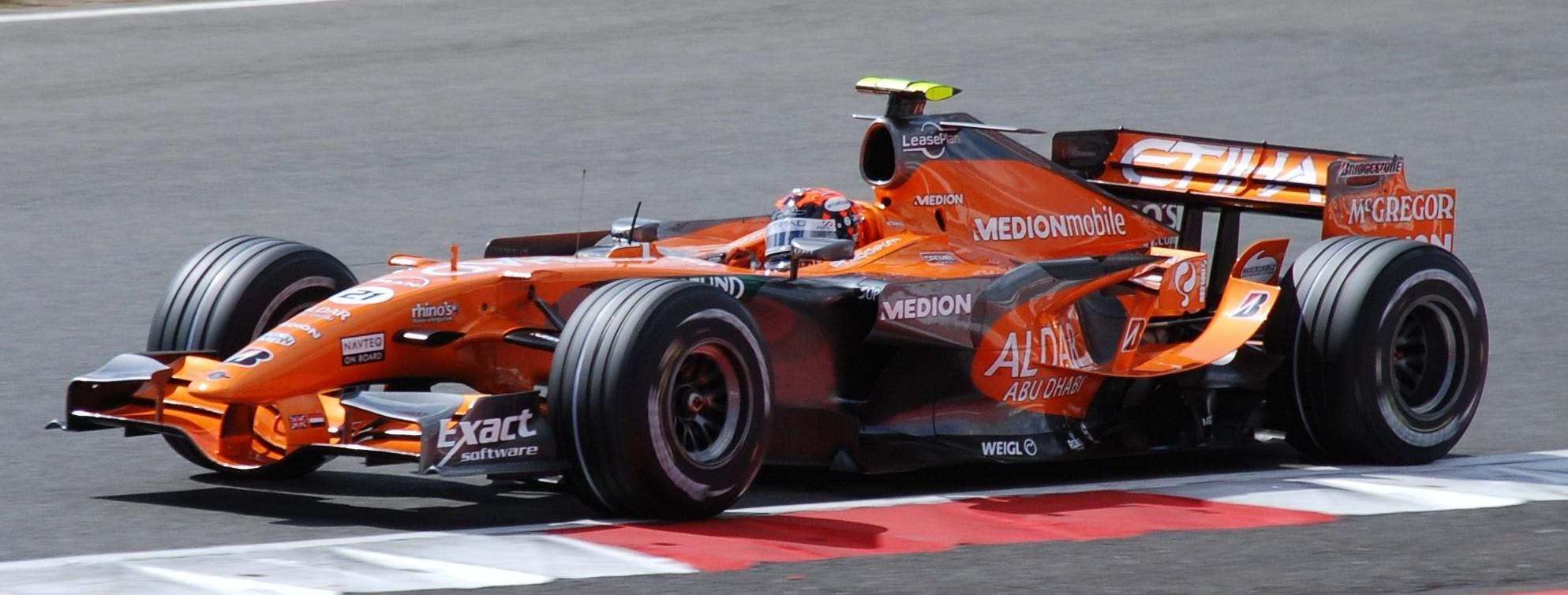
Christijan Albers driving the F8-VII at the 2007 British Grand Prix.

== 2008 season ==
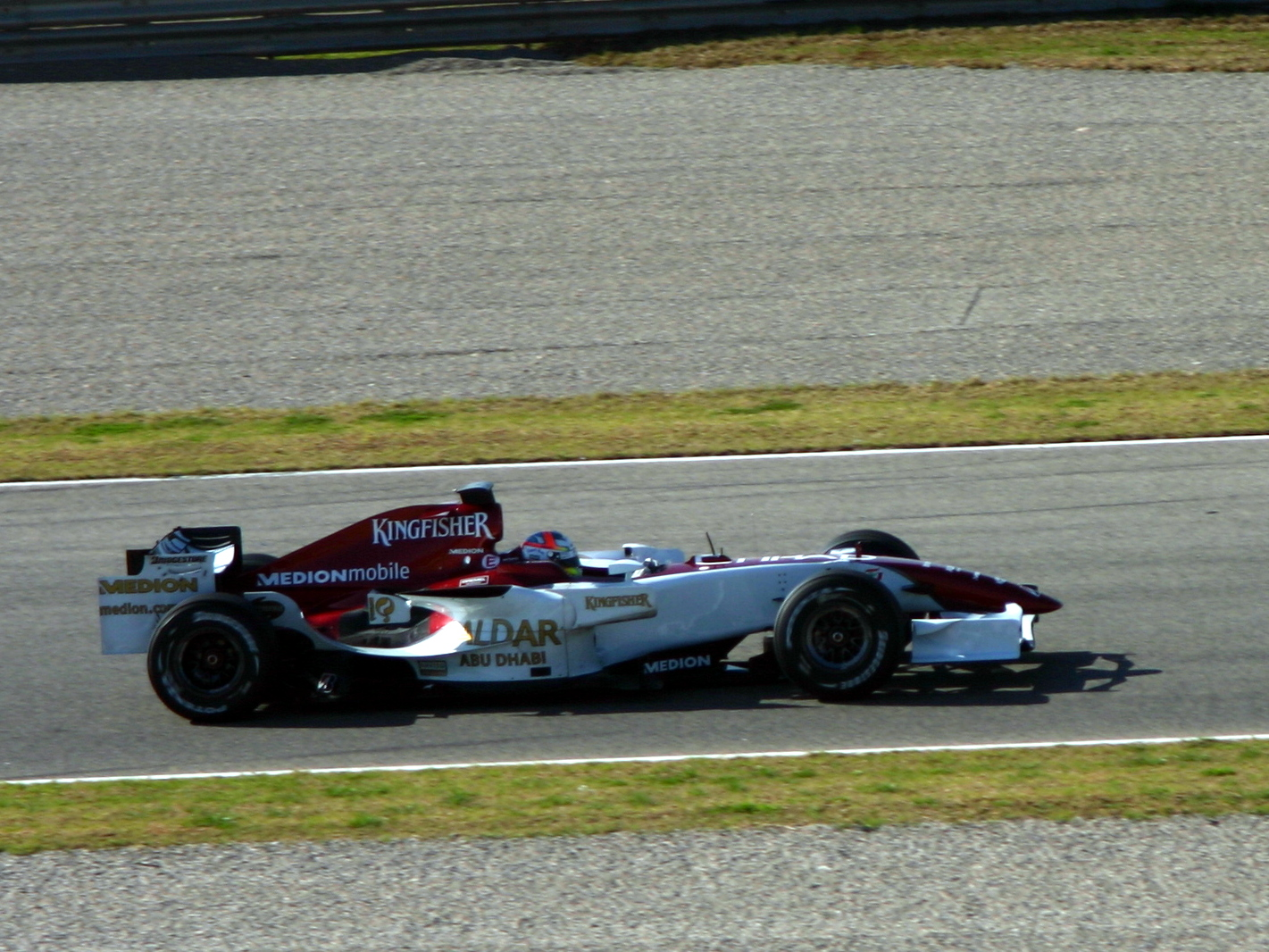
Adrian Sutil testing for Force India in January 2008.

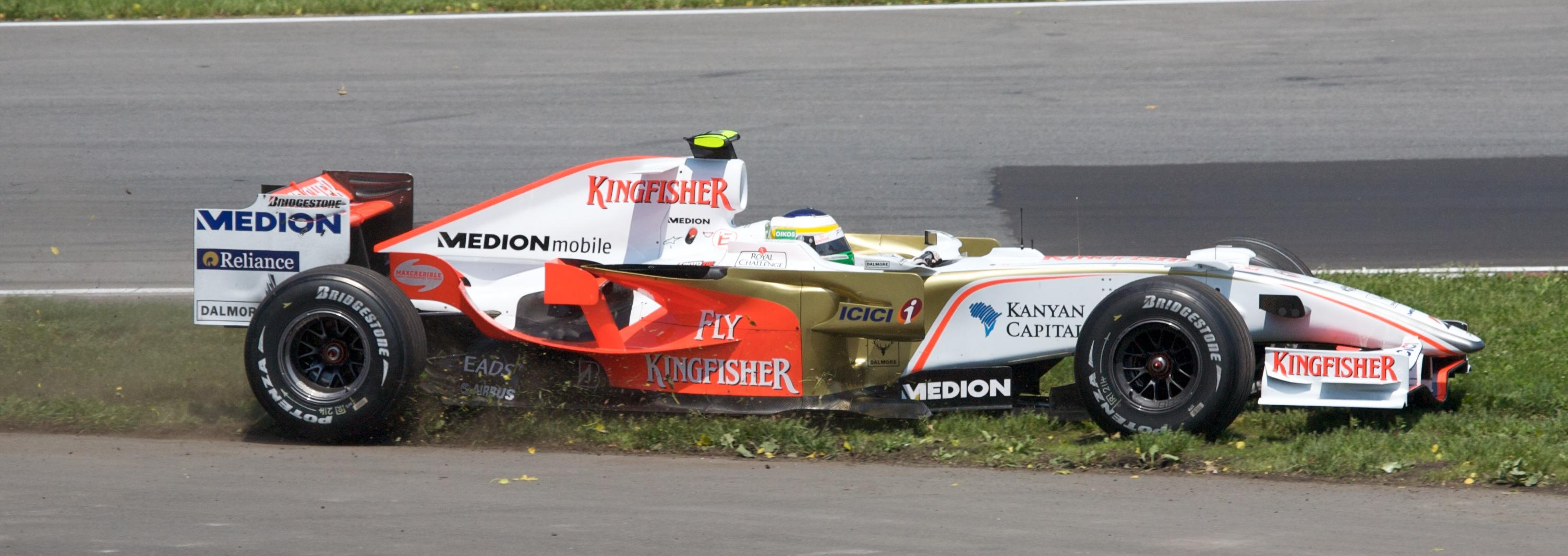
Giancarlo Fisichella driving at the 2008 Canadian Grand Prix.

Spyker was bought by Vijay Mallya during 2007 and became Force India for 2008. With initial 2008 testing being carried out in reliveried F8-VIIBs, the definitive version of the Force India VJM01 – still largely based on the F8-VIIB – made its testing debut on February 25, 2008. The team continued to use 2007-specification Ferrari engines due to cost reasons. Although the team came close to a fourth-place finish at the Monaco Grand Prix, points were not forthcoming, and Force India ended the season at the bottom of the Constructors' Championship standings, only ahead of Super Aguri which had withdrawn from the championship after four races.

From the British Grand Prix onwards, both cars had a shark fin attached to the engine cover.

== Later uses ==
In 2011, Force India teamed up with the artist Dexter Brown to produce an art car. The car was a hand painted VJM01 which was set to be auctioned for charity at the first Indian Grand Prix. The actual car used was VJM01-05, as raced by Giancarlo Fisichella in sixteen of the eighteen races in 2008.

== Other events ==
On 17 April 2007, Albers raced the F8-VII against the Royal Netherlands Air Force (RNLAF) F-16AM fighter jet, piloted by RNLAF pilot Ralph Staal in the event called "Full Throttle" organized by RNLAF. The purpose of the event was to raise awareness of their recruitment program.

== Complete Formula One results ==
(key) (results in bold indicate pole position)

| Year | Entrant | Chassis | Engine | Tyres | Drivers | 1 | 2 | 3 | 4 | 5 | 6 | 7 | 8 | 9 | 10 | 11 | 12 | 13 | 14 | 15 | 16 | 17 | 18 | Points | WCC |
|---|---|---|---|---|---|---|---|---|---|---|---|---|---|---|---|---|---|---|---|---|---|---|---|---|---|
| 2007 | Etihad Aldar Spyker F1 Team | F8-VII | Ferrari V8 | B | | AUS | MAL | BHR | ESP | MON | CAN | USA | FRA | GBR | EUR | HUN | TUR | ITA | BEL | JPN | CHN | BRA | | 1 | 10th |
| 2007 | Etihad Aldar Spyker F1 Team | F8-VII | Ferrari V8 | B | (Germany) Adrian Sutil | 17 | Ret | 15 | 13 | Ret | Ret | 14 | 17 | Ret | Ret | 17 | 21 | | | | | | | 1 | 10th |
| 2007 | Etihad Aldar Spyker F1 Team | F8-VII | Ferrari V8 | B | (Netherlands) Christijan Albers | Ret | Ret | 14 | 14 | 19 | Ret | 15 | Ret | 15 | | | | | | | | | | 1 | 10th |
| 2007 | Etihad Aldar Spyker F1 Team | F8-VII | Ferrari V8 | B | (Germany) Markus Winkelhock | | | | | | | | | | Ret | | | | | | | | | 1 | 10th |
| 2007 | Etihad Aldar Spyker F1 Team | F8-VII | Ferrari V8 | B | (Japan) Sakon Yamamoto | | | | | | | | | | | Ret | 20 | | | | | | | 1 | 10th |
| 2007 | Etihad Aldar Spyker F1 Team | F8-VIIB | Ferrari V8 | B | (Germany) Adrian Sutil | | | | | | | | | | | | | 19 | 14 | 8 | Ret | Ret | | 1 | 10th |
| 2007 | Etihad Aldar Spyker F1 Team | F8-VIIB | Ferrari V8 | B | (Japan) Sakon Yamamoto | | | | | | | | | | | | | 20 | 17 | 12 | 17 | Ret | | 1 | 10th |
| 2008 | Force India F1 Team | VJM01 | Ferrari V8 | B | | AUS | MAL | BHR | ESP | TUR | MON | CAN | FRA | GBR | GER | HUN | EUR | BEL | ITA | SIN | JPN | CHN | BRA | 0 | 10th |
| 2008 | Force India F1 Team | VJM01 | Ferrari V8 | B | (Germany) Adrian Sutil | Ret | Ret | 19 | Ret | 16 | Ret | Ret | 19 | Ret | 16 | Ret | Ret | 13 | 19 | Ret | Ret | Ret | 16 | 0 | 10th |
| 2008 | Force India F1 Team | VJM01 | Ferrari V8 | B | (Italy) Giancarlo Fisichella | Ret | 12 | 12 | 10 | Ret | Ret | Ret | 18 | Ret | 14 | 15 | 14 | 17 | Ret | 14 | Ret | 17 | 18 | 0 | 10th |

^{B} B-spec. car was used.
