= Adrian Sutil =

German racing driver (born 1983)

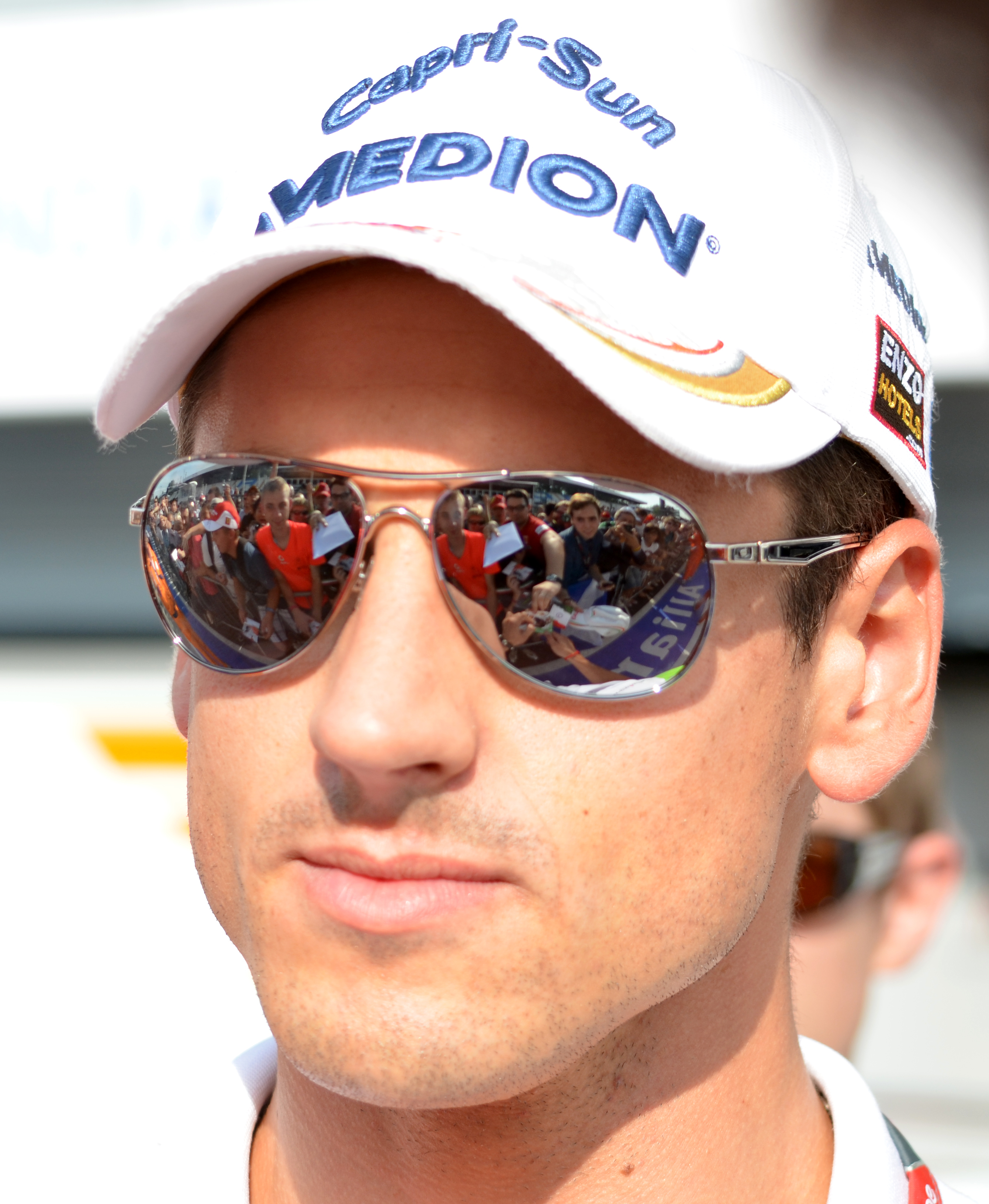
- Sutil at the 2011 Italian Grand Prix
- Born: 11 January 1983 (age 43); Starnberg, Bavaria, West Germany

Formula One World Championship career
- Nationality: (Germany) German
- Active years: 2007–2011, 2013–2014
- Team(s): Spyker, Force India, Sauber
- Car number: 99
- Entries: 128
- Championships: 0
- Wins: 0
- Podiums: 0
- Career points: 124
- Pole positions: 0
- Fastest laps: 1
- First entry: 2007 Australian Grand Prix
- Last entry: 2014 Abu Dhabi Grand Prix

Previous series
- 2022–2023; 2006; 2005–2006; 2004–2005; 2003; 2002: Ferrari Challenge Europe; Japanese F3; A1 Grand Prix; F3 Euro Series; Formula BMW ADAC; Swiss Formula Ford

Championship titles
- 2006; 2002: Japanese F3; Swiss Formula Ford

Adrian Sutil (German pronunciation: [ˈaːdʁiaːn zʊˈtiːl]; born 11 January 1983) is a German racing driver who competed in Formula One from 2007 to 2014.

Born and raised in Starnberg, Sutil started karting aged 14 and moved into single seater racing in 2002 in the Swiss Formula Ford series where he won the title. He moved up into Formula Masters Austria and started one race before stepping into Formula BMW ADAC in 2003. Sutil then raced in the Formula 3 Euroseries, where he was the runner-up to Lewis Hamilton in 2005. He went to Japan in 2006 to race in the All-Japan Formula Three Championship and also finished third in the Macau Grand Prix.

Having been involved in the Midland F1 test team, Sutil was promoted to a race seat for the new Spyker F1 team in 2007. Sutil continued to race with the team under their new guise Force India in 2008 where he remained until 2011. Having made his return to the sport in 2013 again with Force India, he competed in the 2014 season with the Sauber team. Sutil holds the record for the most career starts without a podium finish (128).

== Early life ==
Adrian Sutil was born on 11 January 1983 in Starnberg, Bavaria, West Germany. His parents are both professional musicians: his German mother, Monika, and his Uruguayan father, Jorge. He has two brothers, named Daniel and Raphael. A talented pianist, Sutil speaks fluent German, English, and Spanish and a little Italian.

== Junior racing career ==
=== Karting and lower formulae (1997–2002) ===
Sutil started karting at the age of 14 before moving up to Swiss Formula Ford 1800 in 2002. He won all 12 rounds of the season from pole and added five wins in the Formula Masters Austria championship.

=== Formula BMW / Formula Three (2003–2006) ===
When Sutil moved up to the Formula BMW ADAC championship in 2003 he finished in sixth place in the series, but with no wins. The following season he stepped up to the Formula 3 Euroseries with Colin Kolles' team. Although he scored only twice, the connection he made with Kolles would prove useful in the future. He moved to the ASM team at the final round of the year.

Sutil stayed with ASM for 2005 and was joined by British driver Lewis Hamilton. Hamilton won more races than Sutil, but the German was runner-up to Hamilton and the Briton's only serious competitor in the championship and at the Marlboro Masters of Formula Three at Zandvoort.

Sutil missed the last two rounds of the 2005 Euroseries after joining A1 Team Germany for the inaugural A1 Grand Prix series. He raced for them at three events in Portugal, Australia and Dubai, his best result being two twelfth places.

Sutil spent 2006 racing in Japan and won the All-Japan Formula Three Championship. He showed a very strong performance all season. He also finished third in the Macau Formula Three Grand Prix and made a one-off appearance in Japanese Super GT.

== Formula One career ==
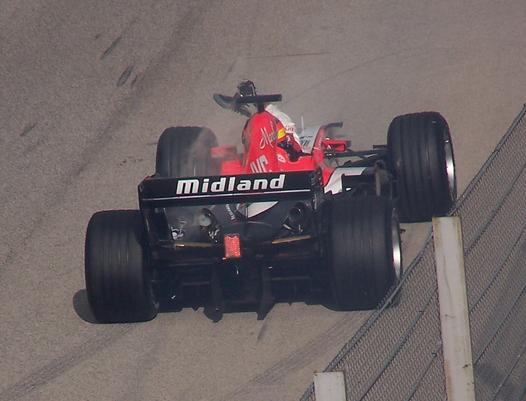
Sutil testing for Midland F1 Racing in February 2006

That year also saw Sutil enter Formula One. In January, he was confirmed as one of the three test drivers for the new Midland F1 Racing team, along with Markus Winkelhock and Giorgio Mondini. This came thanks to his connections with Colin Kolles, who was then running the team.

Sutil appeared for the team as the third driver at the European, French and Japanese Grands Prix. By the time of his third appearance, the outfit had been bought by Spyker Cars. At the end of the year, he was promoted to second driver for the 2007 season, having been signed on a multi-year contract by the Spyker MF1 Team. In an interview with the Official Formula One website, Sutil's first 2007 teammate, Christijan Albers, commented that "Adrian is a good driver and he will be quick this year, but as a driver you should always be pushing to the limits without thinking what the guy in the car next to you is doing. But Adrian will be a good team-mate and it looks as though he's going to be a big talent [for the future]".

=== Spyker / Force India (2007–2011) ===
==== 2007 ====
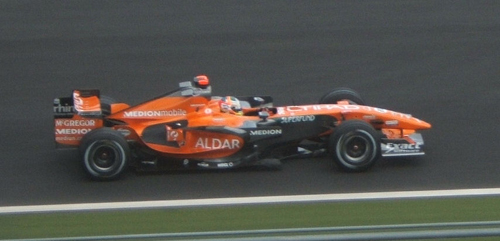
Sutil driving a Spyker F8-VII at the 2007 French Grand Prix

During 2007, Sutil out-qualified and out-raced his team-mate Albers at all Grands Prix before the Dutchman was replaced by Sutil's countryman Markus Winkelhock, test driver for the team up until that time at the European Grand Prix. Sutil out-qualified Winkelhock, although the latter went on to lead the race and restart after a sudden downpour. Winkelhock resumed his third driver role for the following grand prix at Hungary when Japanese driver Sakon Yamamoto took over the second team seat. Sutil out-performed Yamamoto in the race, passing Honda drivers Rubens Barrichello and Jenson Button.

In the Hungarian Grand Prix, Sutil was the first Spyker driver in 2007 to beat another running classified finisher, Honda's Rubens Barrichello.

For the Turkish Grand Prix, a B-spec car was expected for the Spyker team, but it failed a rear crash test and Sutil continued to use the older spec car. After fuel pressure problems, he was forced to start the race from the pits and finished five laps behind. At Monza, despite the introduction of the B-spec Spyker F8-VII and due to the nature of the circuit, the Spykers were largely uncompetitive once again and Sutil finished 19th, again only in front of his team-mate.

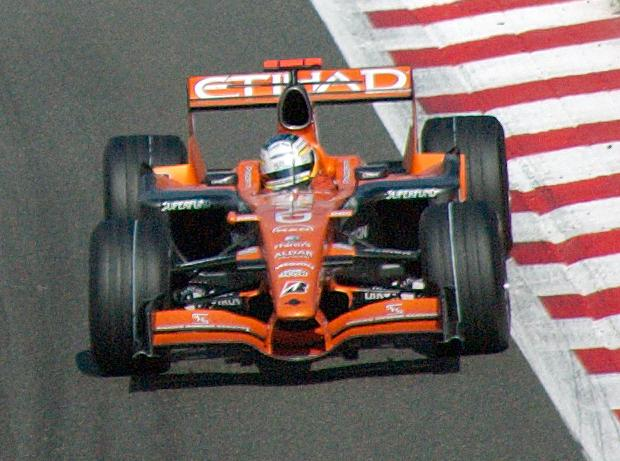
Sutil driving for Spyker at the 2007 Belgian Grand Prix

At the Belgian Grand Prix, the strengths of the B-spec car were fully evident with both Sutil and Yamamoto setting competitive times through the three practice sessions culminating in Sutil qualifying only half a second behind 16th placed man Vitantonio Liuzzi. During the race, Sutil passed the Toyota of Jarno Trulli, Hondas of Rubens Barrichello and Jenson Button as well as the Red Bull's David Coulthard, Toro Rosso's Vitantonio Liuzzi and Williams driver Alexander Wurz. He ran as high as 12th before finishing 14th. He was highly praised for his efforts by both team and media.

Two weeks later in the rain at Fuji Speedway, Japan, it seemed Sutil had narrowly missed an opportunity to score Spyker's first ever point, briefly holding eighth position on the penultimate lap of the high-attrition race after Nick Heidfeld retired his BMW, but was almost immediately passed by fellow backmarker Vitantonio Liuzzi in the Toro Rosso and finished ninth. After the race it was found that Liuzzi had overtaken Sutil under yellow flags, and the 25-second penalty for the Italian promoted Sutil to the final points position. Toro Rosso appealed the decision, but the penalty was upheld.

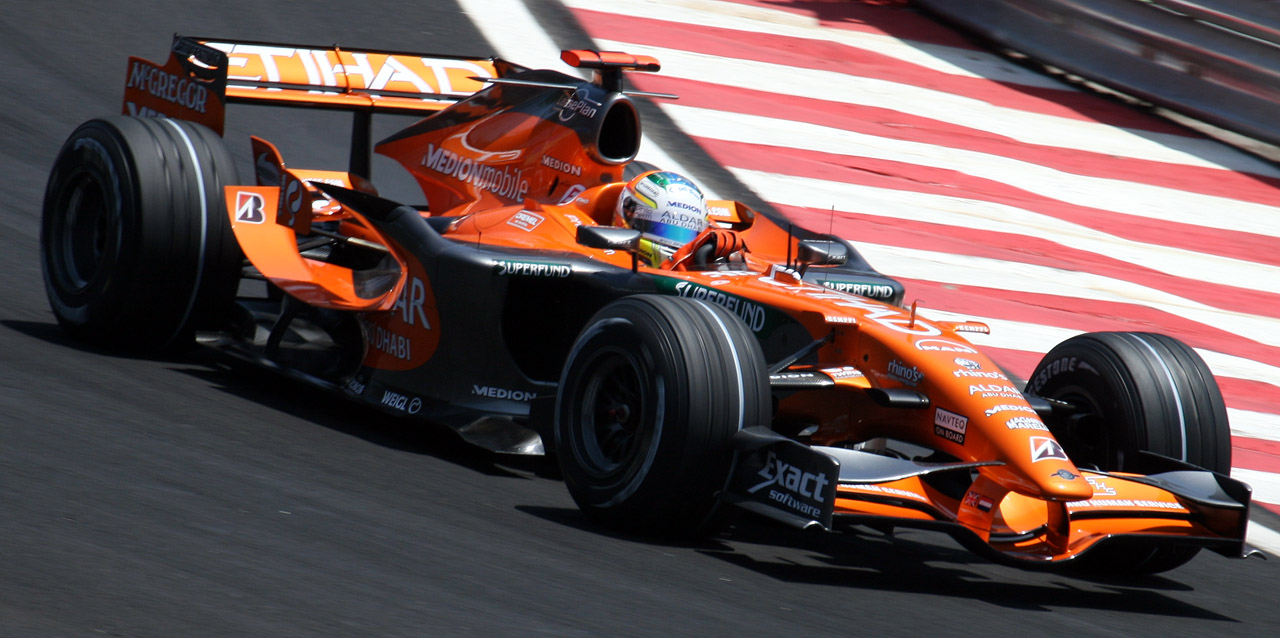
Sutil driving Spyker F8-VII B at the 2007 Brazilian Grand Prix, Spyker's last race

Spyker were not competitive in the final two races of the year, neither of which Sutil finished. He has been praised by many for his performances in the 2007 Formula One Championship. Despite driving the most uncompetitive car of the year, the German rookie impressed by not only dominating all of his teammates in both qualifying and race conditions, but also by challenging other drivers with superior equipment.

==== 2008 ====
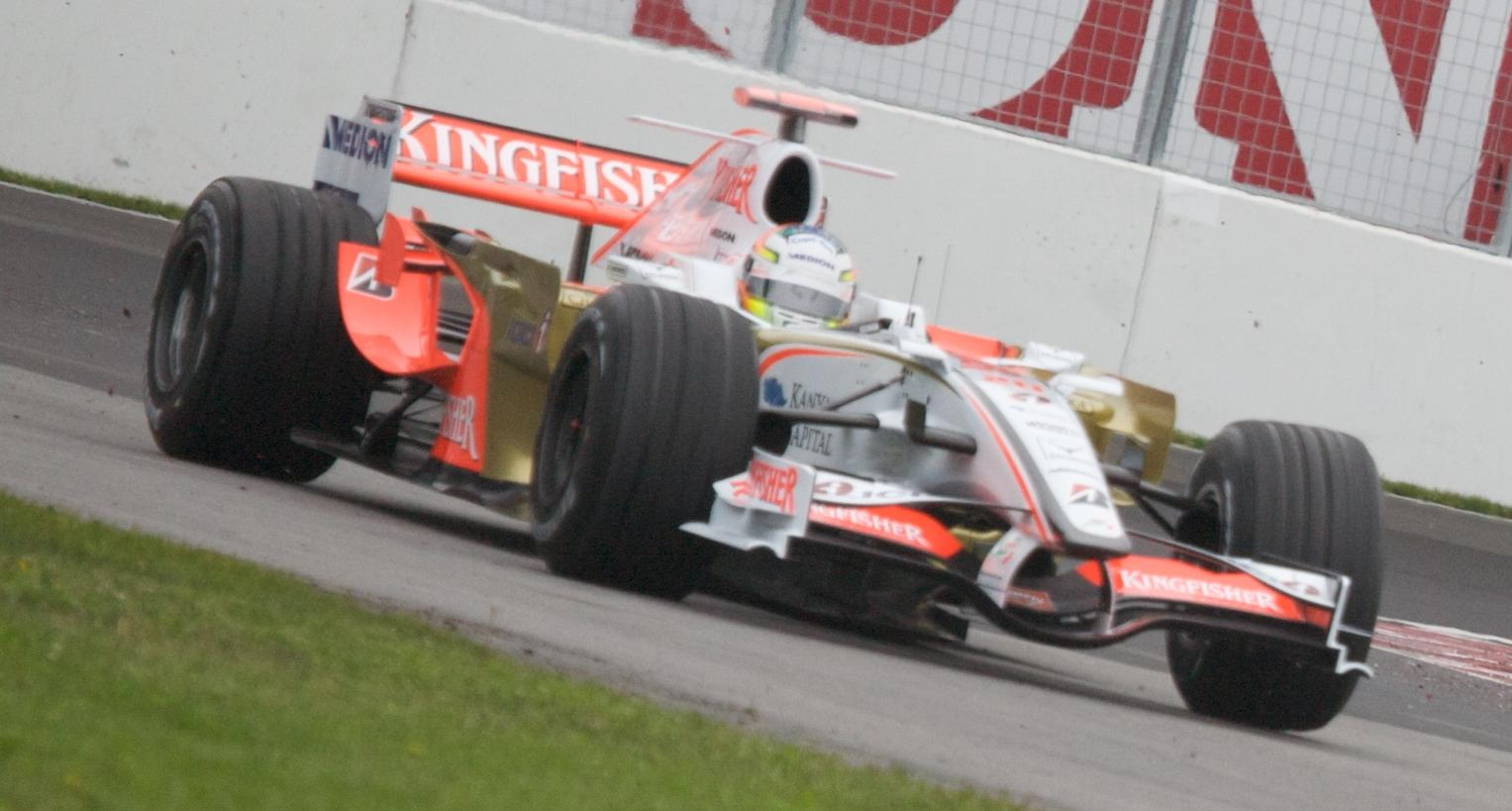
Sutil driving for Force India at the 2008 Canadian Grand Prix

Sutil continued with the team in 2008 under its new identity as Force India, after briefly entertaining the possibility of a drive with McLaren or Williams. The first two races of the season ended with mechanical failures

While running in a very strong fourth position in Monaco with six laps remaining, he was hit in the rear by fifth placed Kimi Räikkönen who lost control of his car while braking for the harbour chicane. A crash a few laps earlier had resulted in the safety car being deployed, with Sutil losing his considerable lead over the Finnish driver. Sutil's car suffered damage to the rear diffuser, and he was forced to retire. Mike Gascoyne called for Räikkönen to be punished over the incident. No punishment, however, was given. However, Sutil had overtaken three cars under yellow flags and according to steward Paul Gutjahr, should he have reached the chequered flag, he would have been given a 25-second penalty which would have dropped him out of the point-scoring positions.

On 17 October, Force India announced they would keep Sutil for the 2009 season.

==== 2009 ====
Sutil and the Force India team started the year with a real optimism of points scoring finishes when the European part of the season started after the first four races. BBC commentator Martin Brundle expressed his personal view that:

"Adrian Sutil will need to be a lot more consistent in 2009 if he is going to establish himself as a bona fide F1 driver. [However,] Sutil can put a good race together and I don't think the Force Indias will necessarily be at the bottom of the timesheets this season."

In Australia, after starting from 16th on the grid, Sutil progressed steadily through the field to finish just outside the points in ninth place. In Malaysia, he qualified 19th and finished 15th when the race was stopped on lap 33 due to torrential rain.

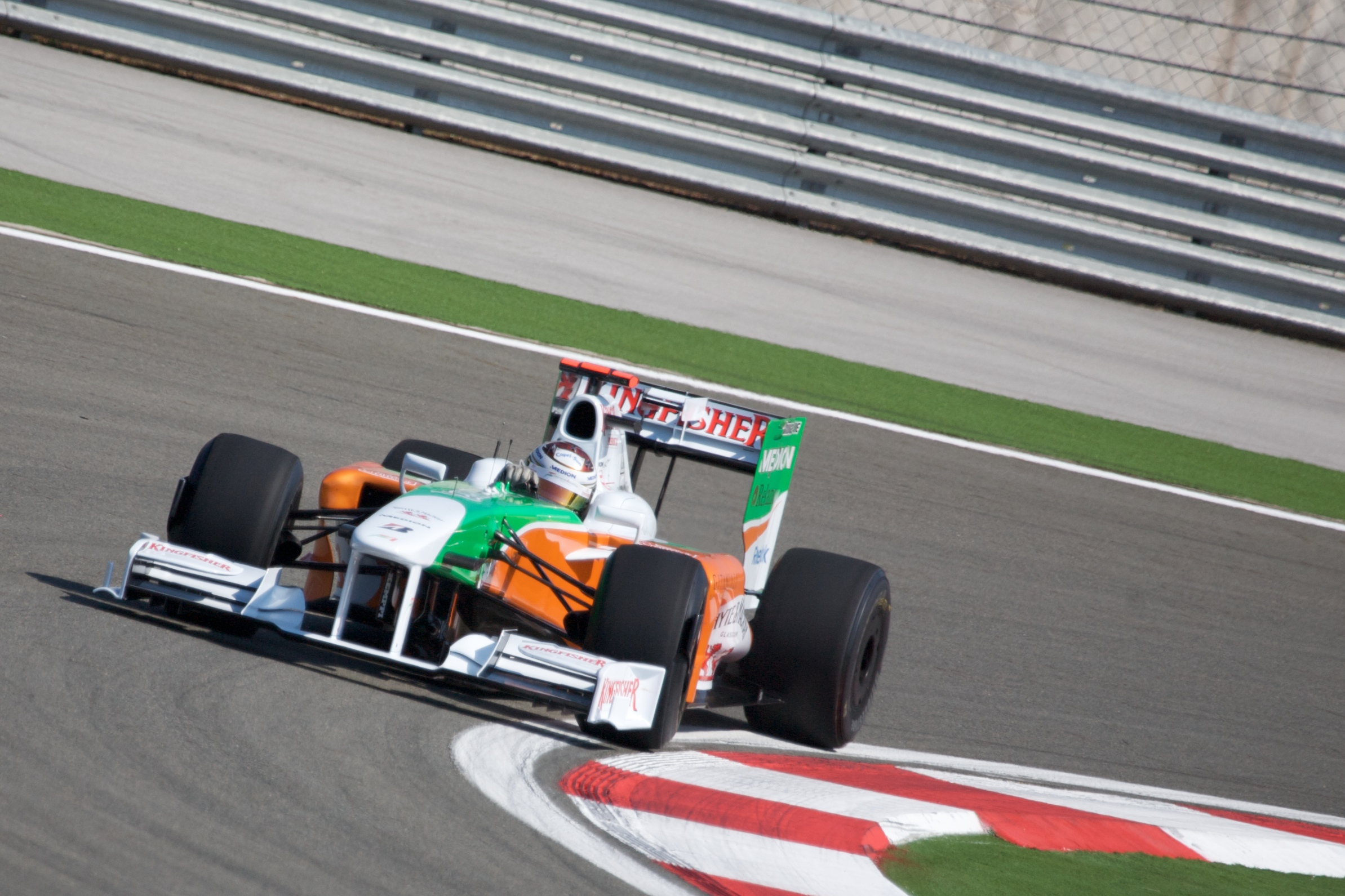
Sutil driving for Force India at the 2009 Turkish Grand Prix

In China, Sutil was running in sixth place with six laps remaining when he lost control of his Force India – due to aquaplaning – resulting in him crashing and forcing him to retire.

In Bahrain, Sutil was penalised for blocking Mark Webber during the first qualifying session. He personally walked into Webber's room to apologise for the incident.

In Spain, after running wide at the first corner of the first lap, Sutil rejoined the track only to hit the Toyota of Jarno Trulli. The Italian had also run wide and was rejoining the track. This forced both drivers to retire and caused the two Toro Rossos of Sébastien Bourdais and Sébastien Buemi to crash into each other.

In Monaco, Sutil finished 14th and finished 17th in Turkey, after qualifying a career-best of 15th.

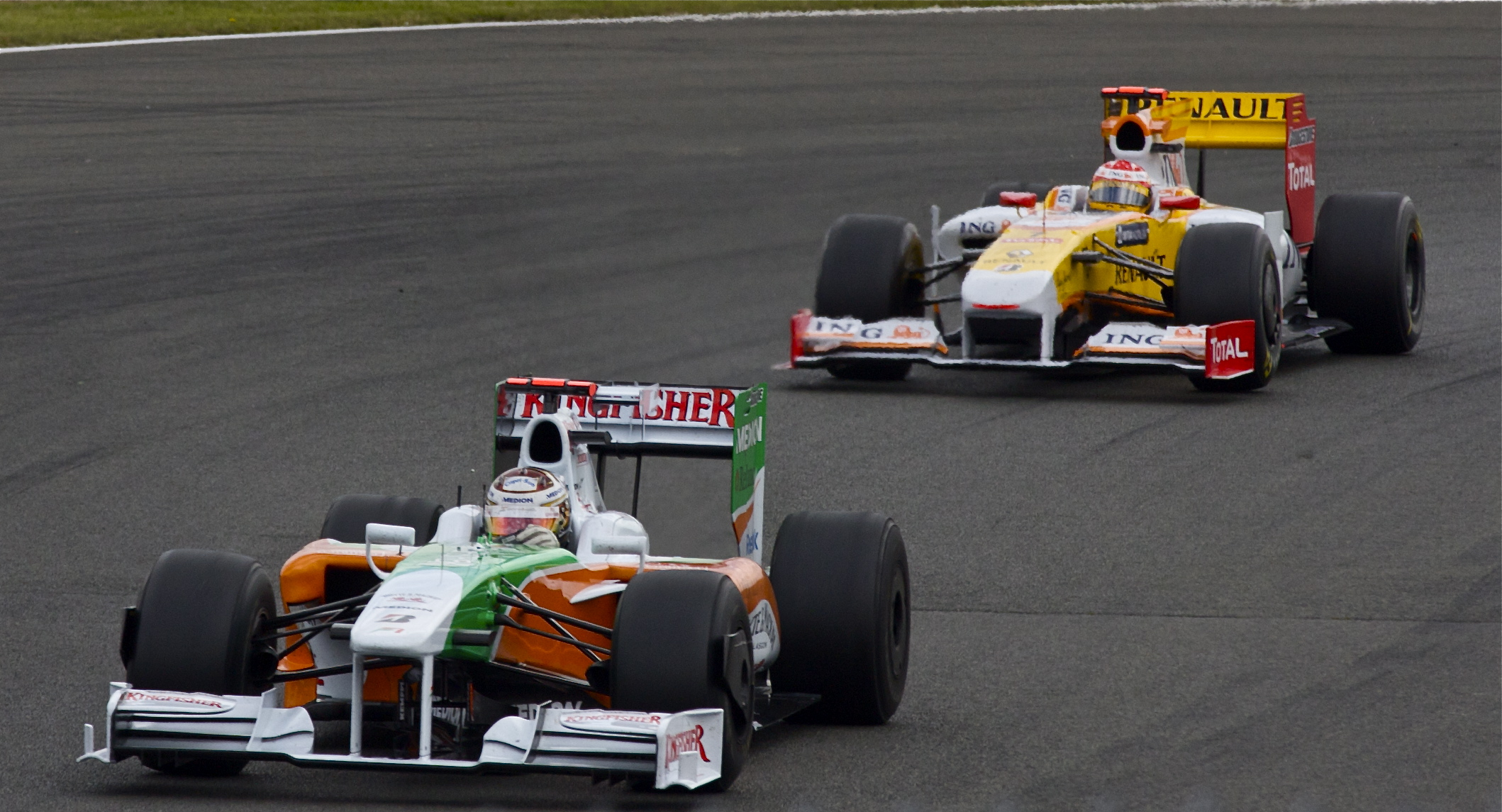
Sutil leading Fernando Alonso at the 2009 British Grand Prix

In qualifying in Britain, Sutil went off at Abbey corner after brake failure in Q1. Qualifying was red flagged and as a result no one else could post a lap time. This meant that Sutil was to start from 18th on the grid, although the team had hoped that both Sutil and Giancarlo Fisichella would get into Q2. Due to the damage caused by the accident he had to start from the pit lane because he needed to use a new car and a new engine, and went on to finish 17th in an uneventful race.

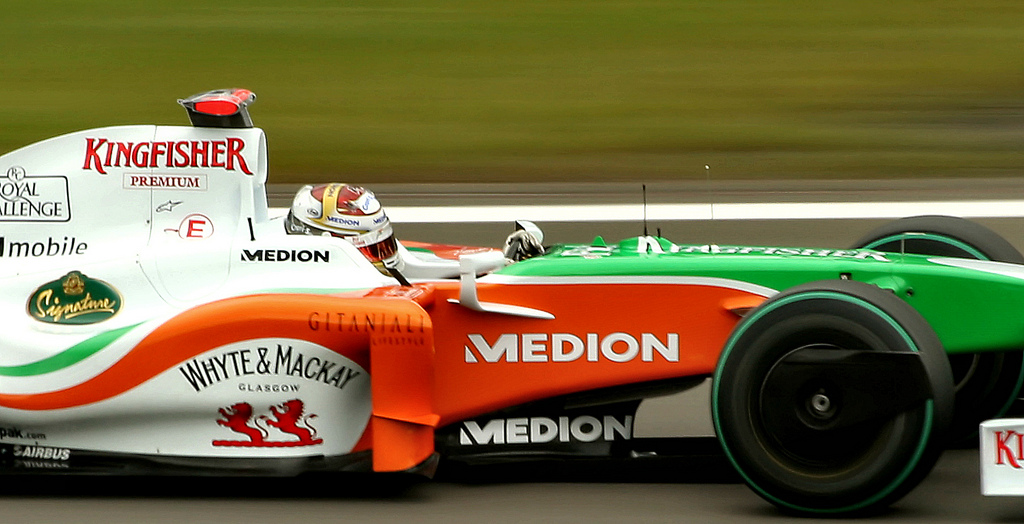
Sutil at the 2009 German Grand Prix

In Germany, Sutil took advantage of the unpredictable conditions in qualifying, and secured his best-ever qualifying position of seventh. In the race, he was lying in second place for a while before his first pit stop. However, a collision with Kimi Räikkönen after coming out of the pit lane meant he had to pit again to replace his front wing. He finished 15th. It was the second time that a collision with Räikkönen cost Sutil the chance to score points, after the previous incident at the 2008 Monaco Grand Prix.

In Hungary, he was forced to retire after just two laps because a water temperature problem caused the engine to overheat, after qualifying 17th.

In Valencia, new aerodynamic upgrades for the VJM02 saw him qualify 12th, and he then raced steadily to finish tenth, demonstrating that the team were at last showing signs of competitiveness, as teammate Fisichella finished 12th behind Heidfeld's BMW Sauber.

In Belgium, he qualified 11th, although the main celebrations in the Force India pit were for teammate Giancarlo Fisichella's excellent pole position. Sutil finished 11th, while Fisichella finished less than a second behind Kimi Räikkönen's race-winning Ferrari.

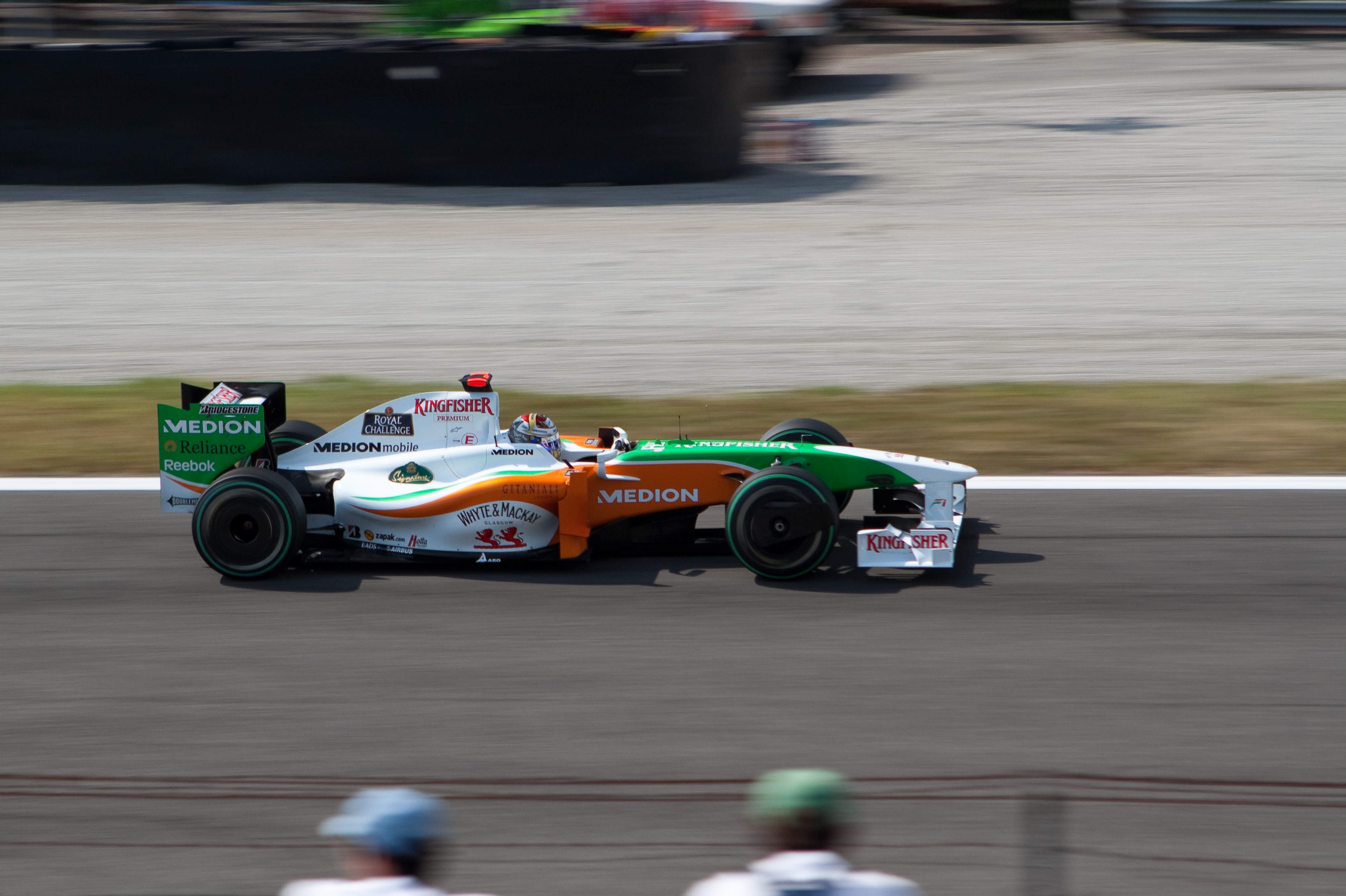
Sutil at the 2009 Italian Grand Prix

At the Italian Grand Prix, Sutil took his career best qualifying result of second place and finished fourth (third of the cars without KERS) in the race behind Räikkönen, despite accidentally overshooting his mechanics during his final pit stop, but they suffered only minor injuries. He also recorded the fastest lap of the race, his first in Formula One and the first fastest lap recorded for Force India. This finish would be the best of his F1 career.

In Singapore, Sutil was forced to retire after he collided with Nick Heidfeld of BMW Sauber, moving into his path as he recovered from a spin. After the race, Sutil was reprimanded by race stewards and fined $20,000 for causing an avoidable accident.

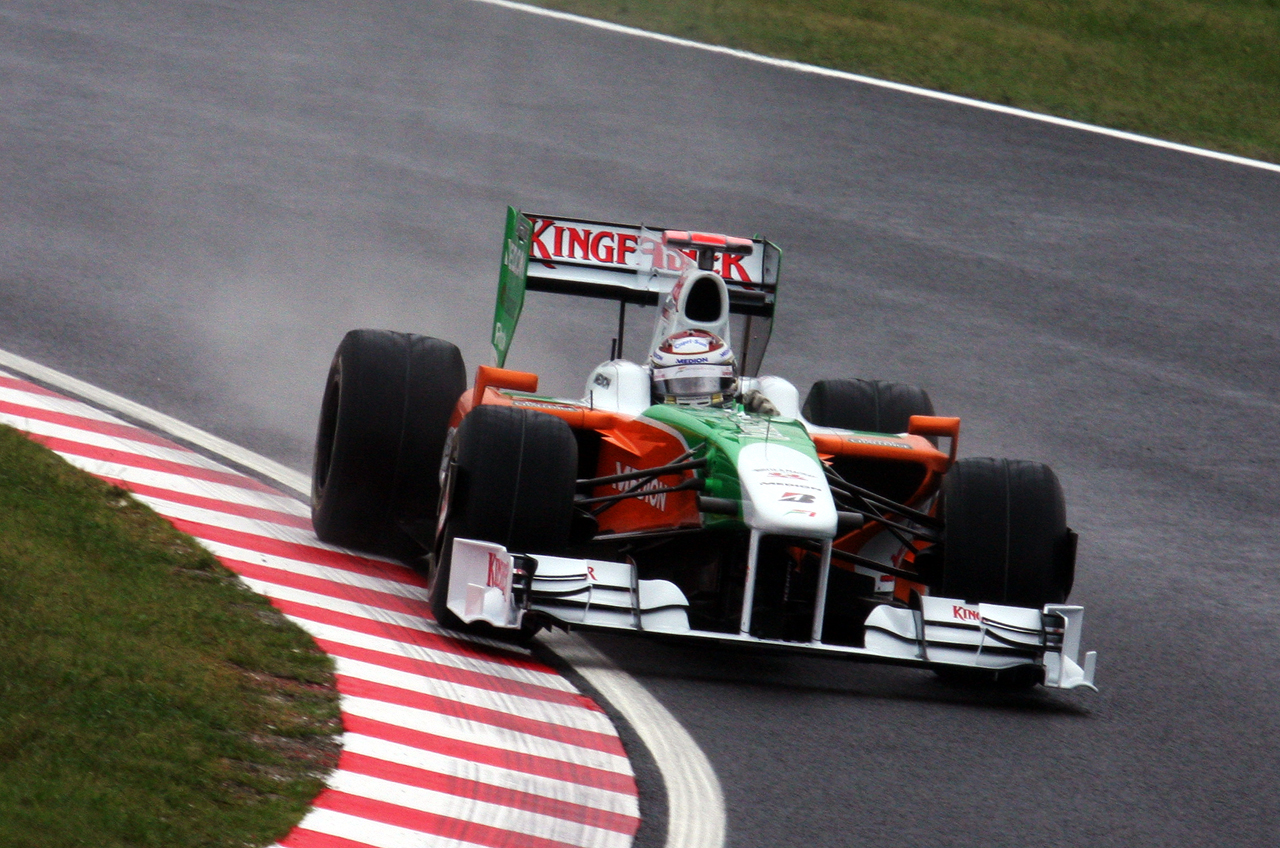
Sutil during practice for the 2009 Japanese Grand Prix

In Japan, Sutil took his second best career qualifying result of fourth, but was given a five-place grid place penalty along with Jenson Button, Rubens Barrichello and Fernando Alonso for not slowing down while yellow flags were waved (due to a crash by Sebastien Buemi, who was also demoted five places for attempting to drive his badly damaged Toro Rosso back to the pits) and started the race from eighth on the grid. Sutil finished 13th.

In the wet qualifying session in Brazil, Sutil qualified third, but retired on lap one following a collision with the Toyota of Jarno Trulli. Out of control on the wet grass outside Turn 5, Trulli hit Sutil, and then slid back onto the track and struck Alonso's Renault, resulting in all three being out of the race. Trulli blamed Sutil for pushing him outside the track at the fifth corner and thus causing the accident, and furiously berated the German at the side of the track in full-view of worldwide TV cameras. This time the stewards took no action against Sutil for the accident, while Trulli was fined $10,000 for his unacceptable behaviour. The matter was not resolved however, as Sutil and Trulli still argued about the accident two weeks later at the driver's press conference for the Abu Dhabi Grand Prix.

In Abu Dhabi, Sutil was unusually off the pace, qualifying only 18th on the grid. Although he overtook several cars during the race, a poor pit strategy resulted in Sutil finishing the race at the back of the field, scrapping with Fisichella (who had joined Ferrari) and Renault's Romain Grosjean. The German eventually finished 17th, one lap down but ahead of the Frenchman.

==== 2010 ====
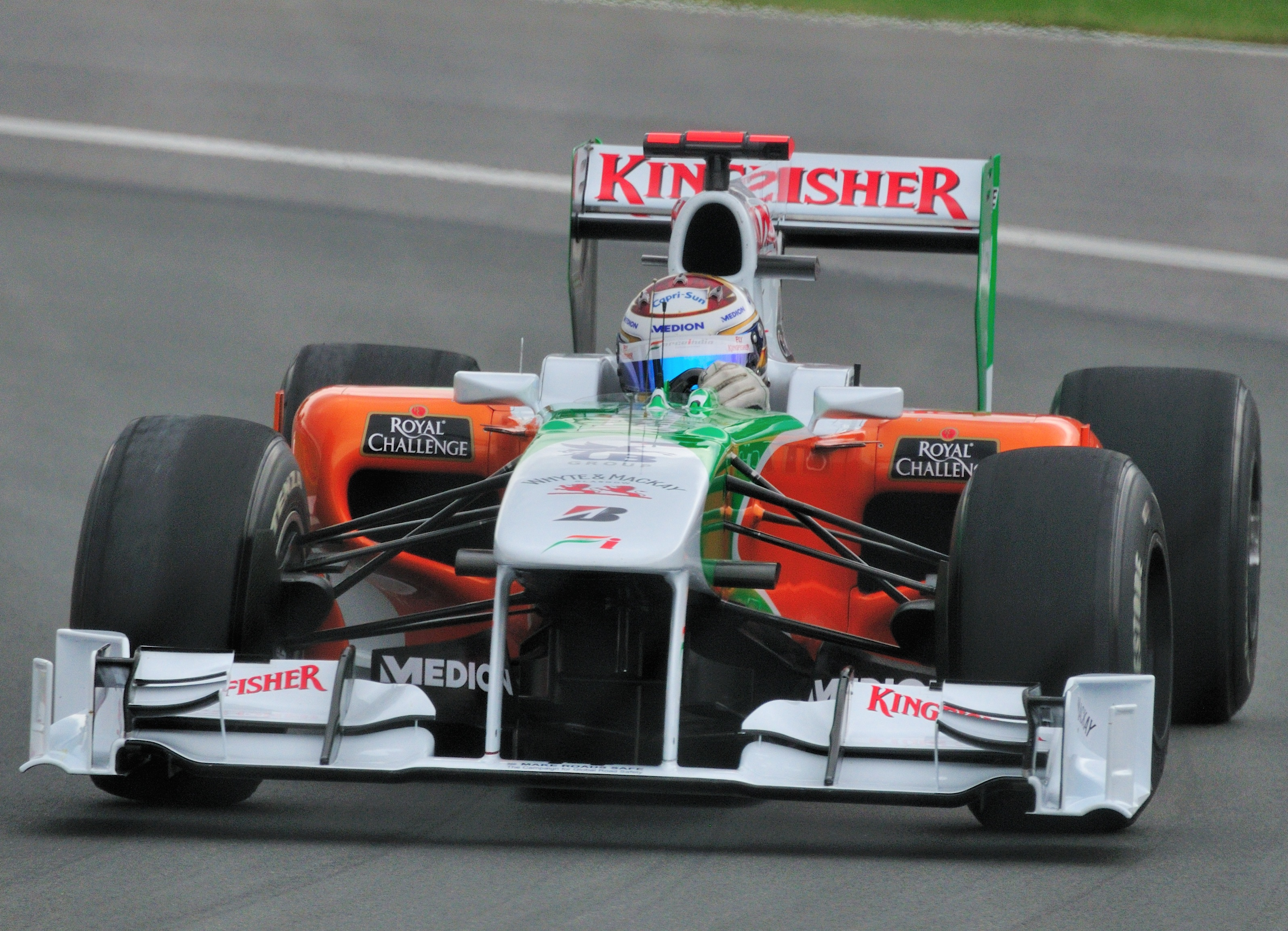
Sutil driving for Force India at the 2010 Canadian Grand Prix

Sutil was in talks with Force India to renew his contract, and on 27 November 2009, the team announced that the German's contract had been renewed, while test-driver Vitantonio Liuzzi was given a full-time race seat. Sutil qualified tenth for the first two races of the year, but a collision with Robert Kubica in Bahrain and a mechanical failure in Australia meant he was unable to score points in either race. However, Sutil commented that the performances proved that the team could now score points in dry races. This comment was backed up by Sutil's fifth-place finish in the following race in Malaysia. In China, he finished 11th. In Spain, he finished seventh, and in Monaco, he finished eighth. Sutil again finished in the points in Turkey with a ninth place. He followed this result with points scoring finishes in the next three rounds in Canada, Europe and Britain.

==== 2011 ====
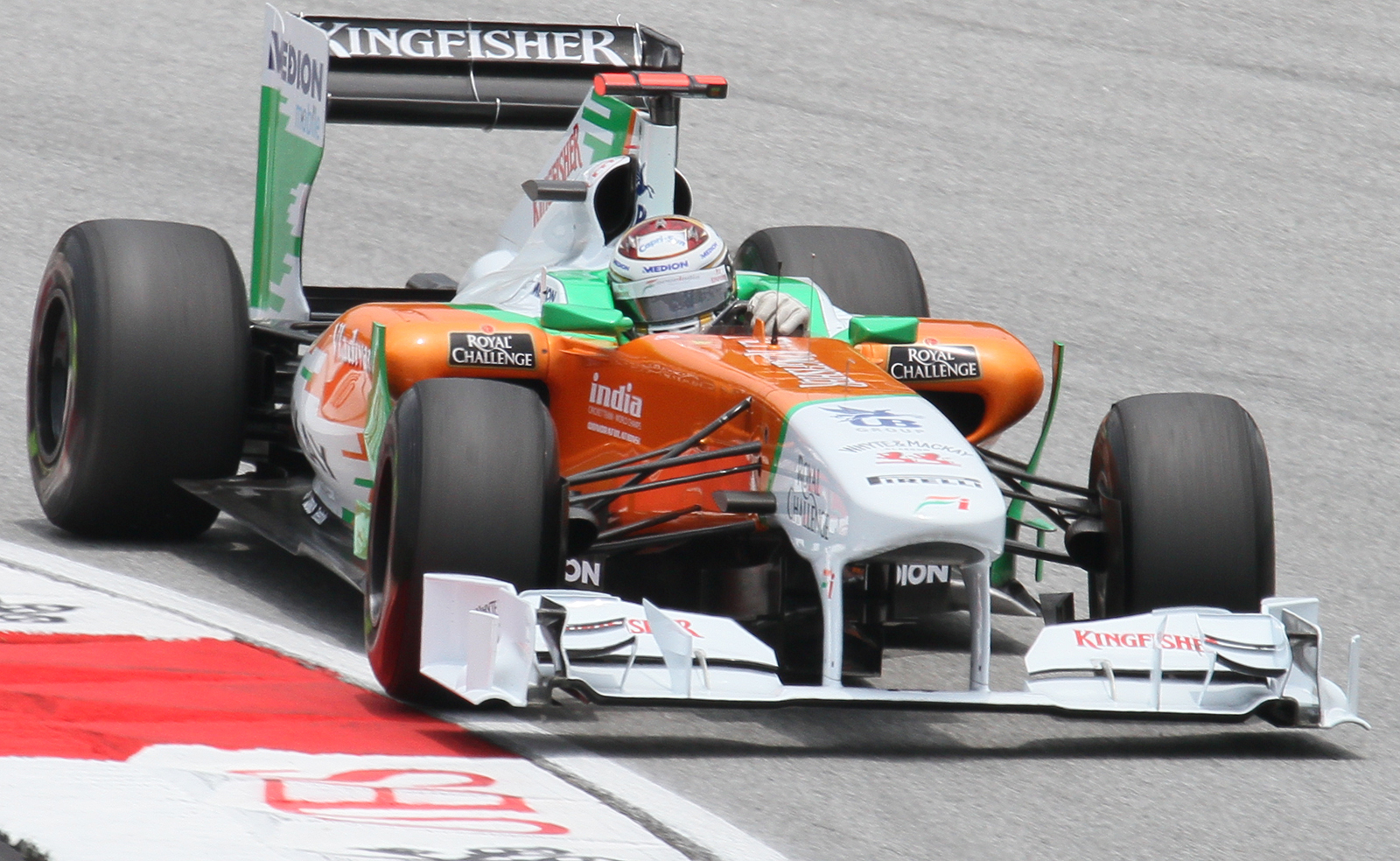
Sutil at the 2011 Malaysian Grand Prix

Sutil remained with Force India for 2011, and was joined by DTM champion Paul di Resta. In the first three races of the season, Sutil was out-qualified by di Resta. Sutil finished ninth in the Australian Grand Prix, at the expense of the Sauber cars being disqualified from the race, having finished eleventh on the road. In Malaysia, Sutil finished eleventh, just behind di Resta, and in China, he qualified eleventh. In Monaco, he had his best result of the season, finishing seventh. He retired in Canada after hitting a wall, which resulted in damage to his car's suspension. A ninth-place finish in Valencia was followed by eleventh at the British Grand Prix, missing out on the final points-scoring position, held by Jaime Alguersuari, by just 0.6 seconds. At his home race, Sutil took a season best finish of sixth place, after implementing a different strategy to some of the drivers around him on the grid, making just two pit stops to the three made by his rivals.

Despite qualifying in the top ten in Hungary, Sutil could only finish 14th, before another points-scoring finish – finishing seventh, after starting 15th on the grid after an accident in qualifying – at the Belgian Grand Prix. He retired at Monza after his car suffered a hydraulics problem, before an eighth-place finish in Singapore, holding off a late-race challenge from Felipe Massa. In Japan, Sutil ran inside the top ten placings for much of the race, but finished the race just outside the points in eleventh place, having been passed by Vitaly Petrov and Nico Rosberg in the closing stages of the race. Another eleventh place followed in Korea, before a ninth-place finish in the inaugural race in India. At the final race in Brazil, Sutil matched his best finish of the season with sixth place, and as a result, moved into ninth place in the final championship standings. As a result of his assault convictions (see below), Sutil was released at the end of the 2011 season and replaced with Nico Hülkenberg.

=== Return to Force India (2013) ===
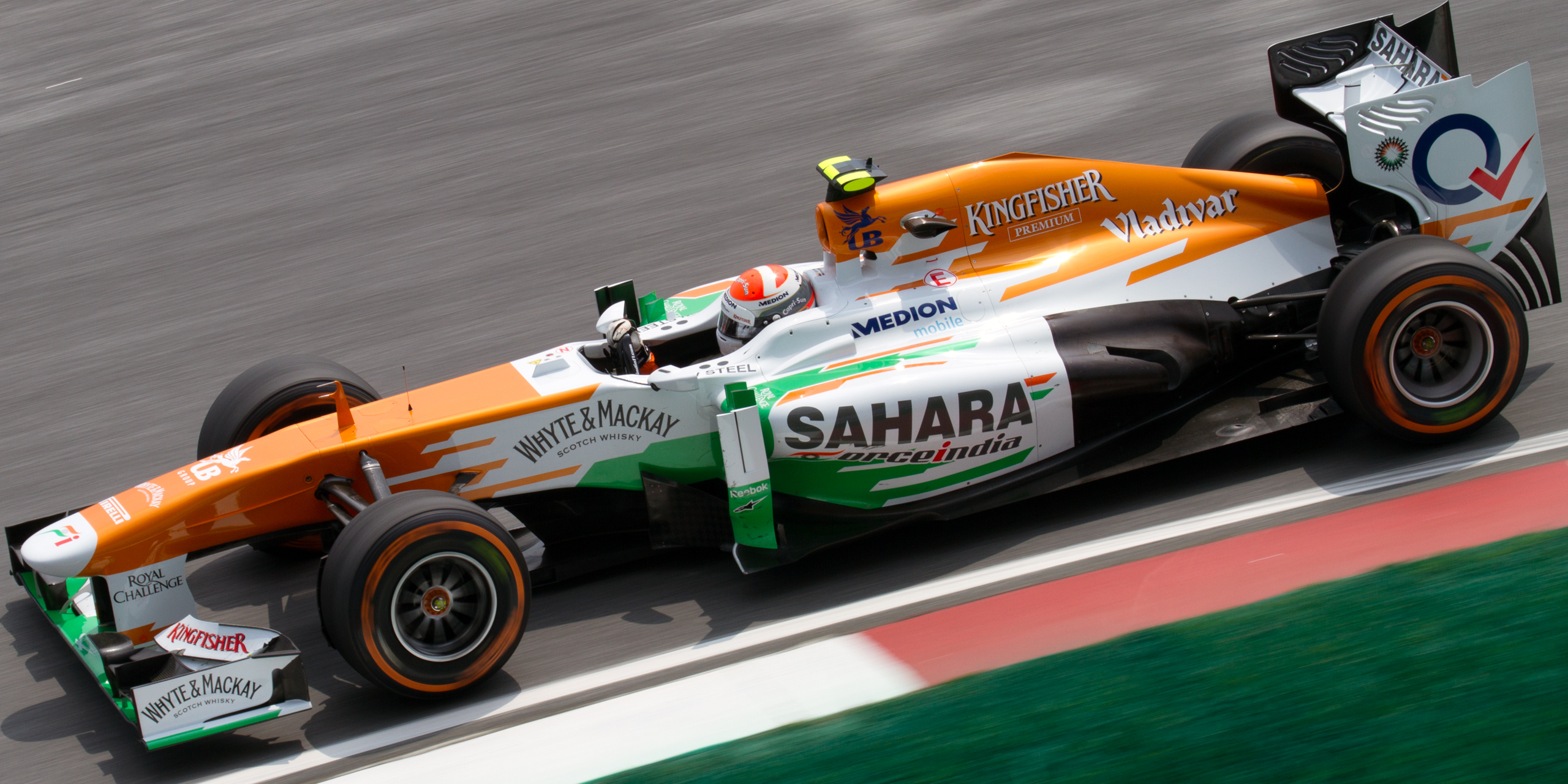
Sutil at the 2013 Malaysian Grand Prix

On 28 February 2013, Force India announced that Sutil would return to the team to complete their driver lineup alongside Paul di Resta. He finished seventh at the season-opening Australian Grand Prix, impressing on his comeback by leading for a number of laps throughout the race.

In Malaysia, Sutil retired from the race following problems with a new captive wheel nut system that the team had introduced at the beginning of the season.

Sutil also retired from the Chinese Grand Prix, after being hit by Esteban Gutiérrez. After two non-points finishes he showed a respectable performance at the Monaco Grand Prix by overtaking the world champions Fernando Alonso and Jenson Button to finally end up in 5th position.

=== Sauber (2014) ===
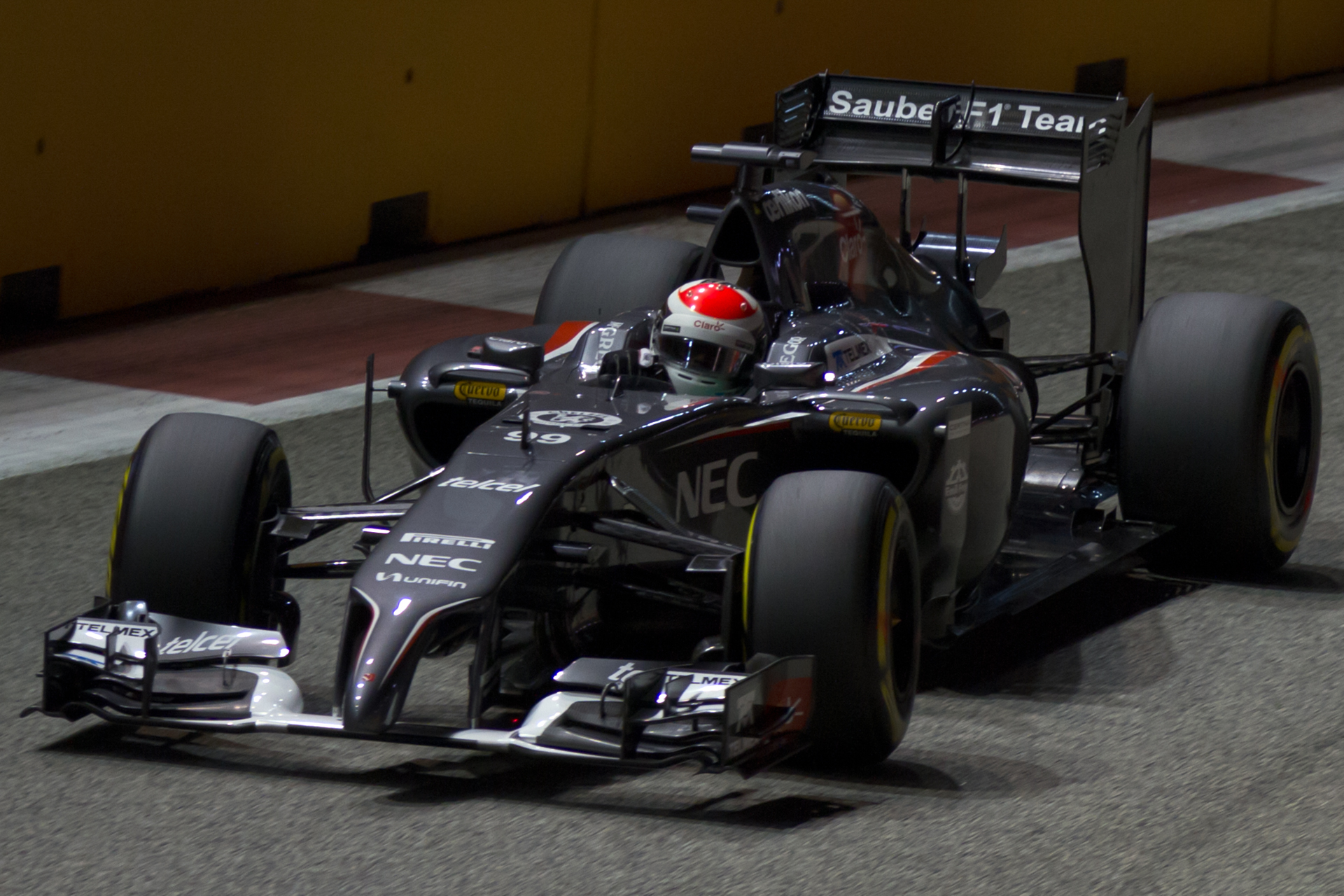
Sutil at the 2014 Singapore Grand Prix

It was announced on 13 December 2013 that Sutil would join Sauber for 2014. For the first six races of the 2014 season, Sutil struggled with a car which lacked pace and he also made a number of mistakes which lost him possible points finishes. At the Japanese Grand Prix, Sutil aquaplaned into turn seven on lap 42, stranding his car. Double yellow flags were waved at the corner while a recovery vehicle was dispatched to recover Sutil's car. The following lap, Jules Bianchi lost control of his Marussia at a high speed, crashing into the recovery vehicle. Bianchi ultimately died on 17 July 2015, aged 25, due to complications from his traumatic brain injury. Sutil ended up with the most DNFs of the season.

In November 2014, it was announced Sutil would be dropped and replaced for the 2015 Formula One season.

=== Williams reserve driver (2015) ===
Sutil joined Williams as a reserve driver prior to the 2015 Malaysian Grand Prix. Sutil was appointed after Williams driver Valtteri Bottas was injured during the Australian Grand Prix, with the team wanting an experienced race driver to deputise for either Bottas or Felipe Massa to maximise their constructors championship points, should either race driver be unable to participate.

== Personal life ==
Sutil is based in Monaco, similarly to many other Formula One drivers. He previously ran a wine business, "Sutil's Fine Wines". He has been in a relationship with Jennifer Becks since 2010.

=== Arrests and conviction ===
==== Shanghai nightclub incident and assault conviction ====
On the evening following the April 2011 Chinese Grand Prix, Sutil was involved in an incident with Genii Capital CEO and owner of the Lotus F1 team Eric Lux in a nightclub in Shanghai. Sutil struck Lux with a champagne glass, causing a wound in his neck which required 24 stitches. Sutil apologised for the incident, which he described as unintentional. Lux's lawyers filed a criminal complaint for physical assault and grievous bodily harm against Sutil. Force India owner Vijay Mallya refused to take action against Sutil until the case proceeded further, but on 16 December 2011 Force India announced they had opted not to renew Sutil's contract for 2012, and would field reserve driver Nico Hülkenberg alongside di Resta.

On 13 January 2012, German prosecutors announced that Sutil would stand trial over the incident, charged with assault occasioning grievous bodily harm. Sutil was convicted of the charge on 31 January 2012, and received an 18-month suspended prison sentence, along with a €200,000 fine that was to be donated to charities "of the court's choosing." Sutil initially had planned on appealing his conviction but eventually decided not to.

Lewis Hamilton, among Sutil's friends at the time, was also present in the nightclub that night. He was named as a defence witness by Sutil's side, but Hamilton did not appear in court because the trial coincided with the launch of his team's car. He stated he could attend a retrial, should one take place, as he would not be occupied on the scheduled day, but as a result, the friendship of the two drivers ended, with Sutil branding Hamilton a "coward."

Sutil remained without a seat throughout 2012.

==== Arrest for fraud and embezzlement ====
In December 2025, Sutil was arrested by German police in Sindelfingen investigating a major international fraud and embezzlement ring. Concurrent address raids took place in Monaco and Switzerland. Sutil is being held in pre-trial detention in Stammheim Prison in Baden Württemberg. Days following the arrest, Sutil's attorney Dirk Schmitz released a statement on behalf of the former Formula 1 driver, claiming he was innocent of the charges. In January 2026, DS Motoren GmbH, a vehicle sales company linked to Sutil filed for insolvency. Certain vehicles, including a Koenigsegg Regera and a Mercedes S600 formerly owned by Elvis Presley were unaccounted for. Sutil's lawyer claims his client was extorted for the removal of nine vehicles worth €17 million, from his private garage in Monaco, by a member of the Wagner Group. In May 2026, Interpol began investigating a Koenigsegg One:1, which went missing from Sutil's collection, with an estimated value of $22 million.

=== Car collection ===
Sutil is a car collector; he has the largest car collection of any Formula 1 driver past or present.

Sutil's car collection includes:

- Koenigsegg Agera S
- Koenigsegg Agera S "Hundra"
- Koenigsegg Agera X (1 of 1)
- Koenigsegg CCR
- Koenigsegg CCR
- Koenigsegg CCR
- Koenigsegg CCX Edition (1 of 2)
- Koenigsegg CCXR
- Koenigsegg One:1
- Koenigsegg Jesko Absolut
- Koenigsegg Jesko Attack
- Koenigsegg Regera
- Pagani Huayra BC
- Pagani Huayra Roadster BC
- Pagani Huayra
- Pagani Huayra
- Pagani Huayra
- Pagani Zonda Riviera
- Pagani Zonda Viola
- Pagani Zonda F Roadster
- Ferrari California T 70th Anniversary
- Ferrari F40
- Ferrari 599 GTO
- Ferrari 488 Pista Spider
- Ferrari Enzo
- Ferrari LaFerrari Aperta
- Ferrari Daytona SP3
- Ferrari Monza SP1
- Bugatti Veyron 16.4 Centenaire (1 of 4)
- Bugatti Veyron 16.4 Pur Sang (1 of 12)
- Bugatti Veyron 16.4 Grand Sport "Soleil de Nuit"
- Bugatti Veyron 16.4 Grand Sport Vitesse Rembrandt Edition (1 of 3)
- Bugatti Veyron 16.4 Grand Sport Vitesse Black Bess (1 of 3)
- Bugatti Veyron 16.4 Grand Sport Vitesse Jean-Pierre Wimile (1 of 3)
- Bugatti Veyron 16.4 Grand Sport Vitesse Meo Constantini (1 of 3)
- Bugatti Veyron 16.4 Super Sport
- Bugatti Chiron Sport 110 Ans
- Bugatti Chiron Pur Sport "Green Rhapsody"
- Lamborghini Reventon Roadster
- Lamborghini Murcielago Versace (1 of 20)
- Mercedes-Benz CLK GTR
- Mercedes Benz SLR McLaren Stirling Moss
- McLaren Senna LM
- Aston Martin One-77
- Aston Martin One-77
- Porsche 911 993 GT2
- Porsche Carrera GT
- Porsche 918 Spyder

==== McLaren Senna LM crash ====
On 30 July 2020, Sutil crashed his McLaren Senna LM into an electricity pylon at the side of the road in Monaco after losing control of the car. Sutil's Senna – one of 35 Senna LM made – was heavily damaged; with its front bumper, front panels and bonnet detached from its chassis, with the windscreen shattered. Sutil emerged from the wreckage unscathed. Rather than being scrapped, Sutil's Senna LM was rebuilt. The process took over two years, with the rebuild process finishing in late December 2022.

== Racing record ==
=== Racing career summary ===
Season	Series	Team	Races	Wins	Poles	F/Laps	Podiums	Points	Position
2002	Swiss Formula Ford 1800	SSPT Racing	12	12	12	12	12	?	**1st**
2003	Formula BMW ADAC	HBR Motorsport	20	0	2	1	3	86	6th
2004	Formula 3 Euro Series	Team Kolles; ASM Formule 3	20	0	2	0	0	9	17th
2004	Masters of Formula 3	Team Kolles	1	0	0	0	0	N/A	20th
2005	Formula 3 Euro Series	ASM Formule 3	18	2	1	3	11	94	**2nd**
2005	Masters of Formula 3	ASM Formule 3	1	0	0	0	1	N/A	**2nd**
2005–06	A1 Grand Prix	A1 Team Germany	6	0	0	0	0	38	15th
2006	Japanese Formula 3 Championship	TOM'S	18	5	3	5	12	212	**1st**
2006	Macau Grand Prix	TOM'S	1	0	0	0	1	N/A	**3rd**
2006	Super GT - GT500	Toyota Team TOM'S	1	0	0	0	0	6	26th
2006	Formula One	Midland F1 Racing	Test driver						
2007	Formula One	Etihad Aldar Spyker F1 Team	17	0	0	0	0	1	19th
2008	Formula One	Force India Formula One Team	18	0	0	0	0	0	20th
2009	Formula One	Force India Formula One Team	17	0	0	1	0	5	17th
2010	Formula One	Force India Formula One Team	19	0	0	0	0	47	11th
2011	Formula One	Force India Formula One Team	19	0	0	0	0	42	9th
2013	Formula One	Sahara Force India Formula One Team	19	0	0	0	0	29	13th
2014	Formula One	Sauber F1 Team	19	0	0	0	0	0	18th
2015	Formula One	Williams Martini Racing	Reserve driver						
2022	Ferrari Challenge Europe - Trofeo Pirelli (Pro)	Gohm Motorsport	6	1	0	0	2	52	5th
2023	Ferrari Challenge Europe - Trofeo Pirelli (Pro)	Gohm - Baron Motorsport	8	1	0	0	5	75	6th

=== Complete Formula BMW ADAC results ===
(key) (Races in bold indicate pole position; races in italics indicate fastest lap)

Year	Entrant	1	2	3	4	5	6	7	8	9	10	11	12	13	14	15	16	17	18	19	20	DC	Points
2003	HBR Motorsport	HOC1; 1; 7	HOC1; 2; 6	ADR; 1; 4	ADR; 2; 6	NÜR1; 1; 6	NÜR1; 2; 7	LAU; 1; 22	LAU; 2 Ret	NOR; 1 Ret	NOR; 2 Ret	NÜR2; 1; 6	NÜR2; 2; 8	NÜR3; 1; 3	**NÜR3**; **2**; 3	**A1R**; **1** Ret	A1R; 2 DSQ	ZAN; 1; 10	ZAN; 2; 10	HOC2; 1; 2	HOC2; 2 Ret	6th	86

=== Complete Formula Three Euroseries results ===
(key) (Races in bold indicate pole position; races in italics indicate fastest lap)

Year	Entrant	Chassis	Engine	1	2	3	4	5	6	7	8	9	10	11	12	13	14	15	16	17	18	19	20	DC	Points
2004	Team Kolles	Dallara F303/012	HWA-Mercedes	HOC; 1 Ret	HOC; 2; 22	EST; 1 Ret	EST; 2; 13	**ADR**; **1**; 4	ADR; 1; 7	PAU; 1; 11	PAU; 2 Ret	NOR; 1 Ret	NOR; 1; 11	MAG; 1; 13	MAG; 2; 11	NÜR; 1; 15	NÜR; 2; 11	ZAN; 1; 15	ZAN; 2; 15	BRN; 1; 15	BRN; 2; 17			17th	9
2004	ASM Formule 3	Dallara F303/014	HWA-Mercedes																			HOC; 3; 20	**HOC**; **4** Ret	17th	9
2005	ASM Formule 3	Dallara F305/059	Mercedes	HOC; 1; 2	HOC; 2; 20	PAU; 1 Ret	PAU; 2; 2	SPA; 1; 1	**SPA**; **2**; 2	MON; 1; 2	MON; 2 Ret	OSC; 1; 2	OSC; 2; 3	NOR; 1 Ret	NOR; 2; 2	NÜR; 1; 1	NÜR; 2; 3	ZAN; 1 Ret	ZAN; 2; 11	LAU; 1; 4	LAU; 2; 2	HOC; 3	HOC; 4	**2nd**	**94**

=== Complete A1 Grand Prix results ===
(key) (Races in bold indicate pole position; races in italics indicate fastest lap)

Year	Entrant	1	2	3	4	5	6	7	8	9	10	11	12	13	14	15	16	17	18	19	20	21	22	DC	Points	Ref
2005–06	Germany	GBR; SPR	GBR; FEA	GER; SPR	GER; FEA	POR; SPR; 12	POR; FEA; Ret	AUS; SPR; Ret	AUS; FEA; Ret	MYS; SPR	MYS; FEA	UAE; SPR; Ret	UAE; FEA; 12	RSA; SPR	RSA; FEA	IDN; SPR	IDN; FEA	MEX; SPR	MEX; FEA	USA; SPR	USA; FEA	CHN; SPR	CHN; FEA	15th	38	

=== Complete All-Japan Formula Three results ===
(key)

Year	Entrant	Chassis	Engine	1	2	3	4	5	6	7	8	9	10	11	12	13	14	15	16	17	18	DC	Points	Ref
2006	TOM'S	Dallara	Toyota	FUJ; 1; 1	FUJ; 2; 4	SUZ; 1; 5	SUZ; 2; 3	MOT; 1; 3	MOT; 2; 1	OKA; 1; 1	OKA; 2; 1	SUZ; 3; 3	SUZ; 4; 3	AUT; 1; 6	AUT; 2; 3	FUJ; 3 Ret	FUJ; 4; 1	SUG; 1; 3	SUG; 2; 2	MOT; 3 Ret	**MOT**; **4** DSQ	**1st**	**212**	

=== Complete Formula One results ===
(key) (Races in bold indicate pole position; races in italics indicate fastest lap)

Year	Entrant	Chassis	Engine	1	2	3	4	5	6	7	8	9	10	11	12	13	14	15	16	17	18	19	WDC	Points
2006	Midland F1 Racing	Midland M16	Toyota RVX-06 2.4 V8	BHR	MAL	AUS	SMR	EUR; TD	ESP	MON	GBR	CAN	USA	FRA; TD	GER	HUN	TUR	ITA					–	-
2006	Spyker MF1 Racing	Spyker M16	Toyota RVX-06 2.4 V8																CHN	JPN; TD	BRA		–	-
2007	Etihad Aldar Spyker F1 Team	Spyker F8-VII	Ferrari 056H 2.4 V8	AUS; 17	MAL; Ret	BHR; 15	ESP; 13	MON; Ret	CAN; Ret	USA; 14	FRA; 17	GBR; Ret	EUR; Ret	HUN; 17	TUR; 21†								19th	1
2007	Etihad Aldar Spyker F1 Team	Spyker F8-VIIB	Ferrari 056H 2.4 V8													ITA; 19	BEL; 14	JPN; 8	CHN; Ret	BRA; Ret			19th	1
2008	Force India F1 Team	Force India VJM01	Ferrari 056 2.4 V8	AUS; Ret	MAL; Ret	BHR; 19	ESP; Ret	TUR; 16	MON; Ret	CAN; Ret	FRA; 19	GBR; Ret	GER; 15	HUN; Ret	EUR; Ret	BEL; 13	ITA; 19	SIN; Ret	JPN; Ret	CHN; Ret	BRA; 16		20th	0
2009	Force India F1 Team	Force India VJM02	Mercedes FO 108W 2.4 V8	AUS; 9	MAL; 17	CHN; 17†	BHR; 16	ESP; Ret	MON; 14	TUR; 17	GBR; 17	GER; 15	HUN; Ret	EUR; 10	BEL; 11	ITA; 4	SIN; Ret	JPN; 13	BRA; Ret	ABU; 17			17th	5
2010	Force India F1 Team	Force India VJM03	Mercedes FO 108X 2.4 V8	BHR; 12	AUS; Ret	MAL; 5	CHN; 11	ESP; 7	MON; 8	TUR; 9	CAN; 10	EUR; 6	GBR; 8	GER; 17	HUN; Ret	BEL; 5	ITA; 16	SIN; 9	JPN; Ret	KOR; Ret	BRA; 12	ABU; 13	11th	47
2011	Force India F1 Team	Force India VJM04	Mercedes FO 108Y 2.4 V8	AUS; 9	MAL; 11	CHN; 15	TUR; 13	ESP; 13	MON; 7	CAN; Ret	EUR; 9	GBR; 11	GER; 6	HUN; 14	BEL; 7	ITA; Ret	SIN; 8	JPN; 11					9th	42
2011	Sahara Force India F1 Team	Force India VJM04	Mercedes FO 108Y 2.4 V8																KOR; 11	IND; 9	ABU; 8	BRA; 6	9th	42
2013	Sahara Force India F1 Team	Force India VJM06	Mercedes FO 108F 2.4 V8	AUS; 7	MAL; Ret	CHN; Ret	BHR; 13	ESP; 13	MON; 5	CAN; 10	GBR; 7	GER; 13	HUN; Ret	BEL; 9	ITA; 16†	SIN; 10	KOR; 20†	JPN; 14	IND; 9	ABU; 10	USA; Ret	BRA; 13	13th	29
2014	Sauber F1 Team	Sauber C33	Ferrari 059/3 1.6 V6 t	AUS; 11	MAL; Ret	BHR; Ret	CHN; Ret	ESP; 17	MON; Ret	CAN; 13	AUT; 13	GBR; 13	GER; Ret	HUN; 11	BEL; 14	ITA; 15	SIN; Ret	JPN; 21†	RUS; 16	USA; Ret	BRA; 16	ABU; 16	18th	0

^{†} Driver failed to finish the race, but was classified as they had completed >90% of the race distance.

Sporting positions
Preceded by João Paulo de Oliveira	All-Japan Formula Three; Champion; 2006	Succeeded by Kazuya Oshima
