= 2007 Belgian Grand Prix =

Coordinates: 50°26′14″N 5°58′17″E

Race 14 of 17 in the 2007 Formula One World Championship
← Previous race	Next race →
- Circuit de Spa-Francorchamps

Race details
- Date: September 16, 2007
- Official name: 2007 Formula 1 ING Belgian Grand Prix
- Location: Circuit de Spa-Francorchamps, Francorchamps, Wallonia, Belgium
- Course: Permanent racing facility
- Course length: 7.004 km (4.352 miles)
- Distance: 44 laps, 308.176 km (191.492 miles)
- Weather: Partly cloudy, mild and dry

Pole position
Driver	(Finland) Kimi Räikkönen	Ferrari
- Time: 1:45.994

Fastest lap
Driver	(Brazil) Felipe Massa	Ferrari
- Time: 1:48.036 on lap 34

Podium
First	(Finland) Kimi Räikkönen	Ferrari
Second	(Brazil) Felipe Massa	Ferrari
Third	(Spain) Fernando Alonso	McLaren-Mercedes

The 2007 Belgian Grand Prix (officially the 2007 Formula 1 ING Belgian Grand Prix) was the fourteenth race of the 2007 FIA Formula One World Championship, returning to the Formula One calendar after a year's absence. It was held on 16 September at the Circuit de Spa-Francorchamps, near the village of Francorchamps, Wallonia, Belgium.

== Report ==
=== Background ===
Going into the race, McLaren driver Lewis Hamilton led the Drivers' Championship by three points from teammate Fernando Alonso and Scuderia Ferrari led the Constructors' Championship by 57 points from BMW Sauber after the exclusion of McLaren from the Constructors' Championship following the Ferrari/McLaren spy saga. Otherwise McLaren would have been leading the Championship.

The race also marked the 100th race start for Australian Red Bull Racing driver Mark Webber.

=== Practice ===
Ferrari tried the new traffic light system for the first time.

=== Qualifying ===
The usual drivers were eliminated in the first qualifying session—Adrian Sutil and Sakon Yamamoto went out in the Spykers along with Takuma Sato and Anthony Davidson in the Super Aguris, Rubens Barrichello in the Honda and Sebastian Vettel in the Toro Rosso.

The second qualifying session was unusual as six drivers in six different cars were eliminated—Alexander Wurz of Williams, Vitantonio Liuzzi of Toro Rosso, Jenson Button of Honda, David Coulthard of Red Bull Racing. Giancarlo Fisichella of Renault and Ralf Schumacher of Toyota. Fisichella was later relegated right to the back of the grid after changing his engine after qualifying.

This left seven different teams in the top 10. Heikki Kovalainen qualified tenth for Renault, just behind Jarno Trulli in the Toyota. Ahead of them were Mark Webber's Red Bull and Nick Heidfeld in the BMW Sauber. Nico Rosberg did very well in the Williams to qualify on row 3 alongside Robert Kubica in the second BMW Sauber. However, the Pole was given a ten place grid drop for an engine change. Once again, McLaren and Ferrari occupied the top four places. Fernando Alonso pipped McLaren teammate Lewis Hamilton to 3rd place, but Ferrari dominated, with Kimi Räikkönen beating Felipe Massa to get his 14th career pole. It was Ferrari's first front-row lockout since the 2006 Japanese Grand Prix.

Due to FIA rules about the order in which penalties are applied, Kubica's penalty was applied first. This left him 15th and behind Fisichella. Then the Italian's penalty was applied, so Kubica ended up 14th. This meant Coulthard, Button and Liuzzi all gained two places as both drivers had been ahead of them.

=== Race ===
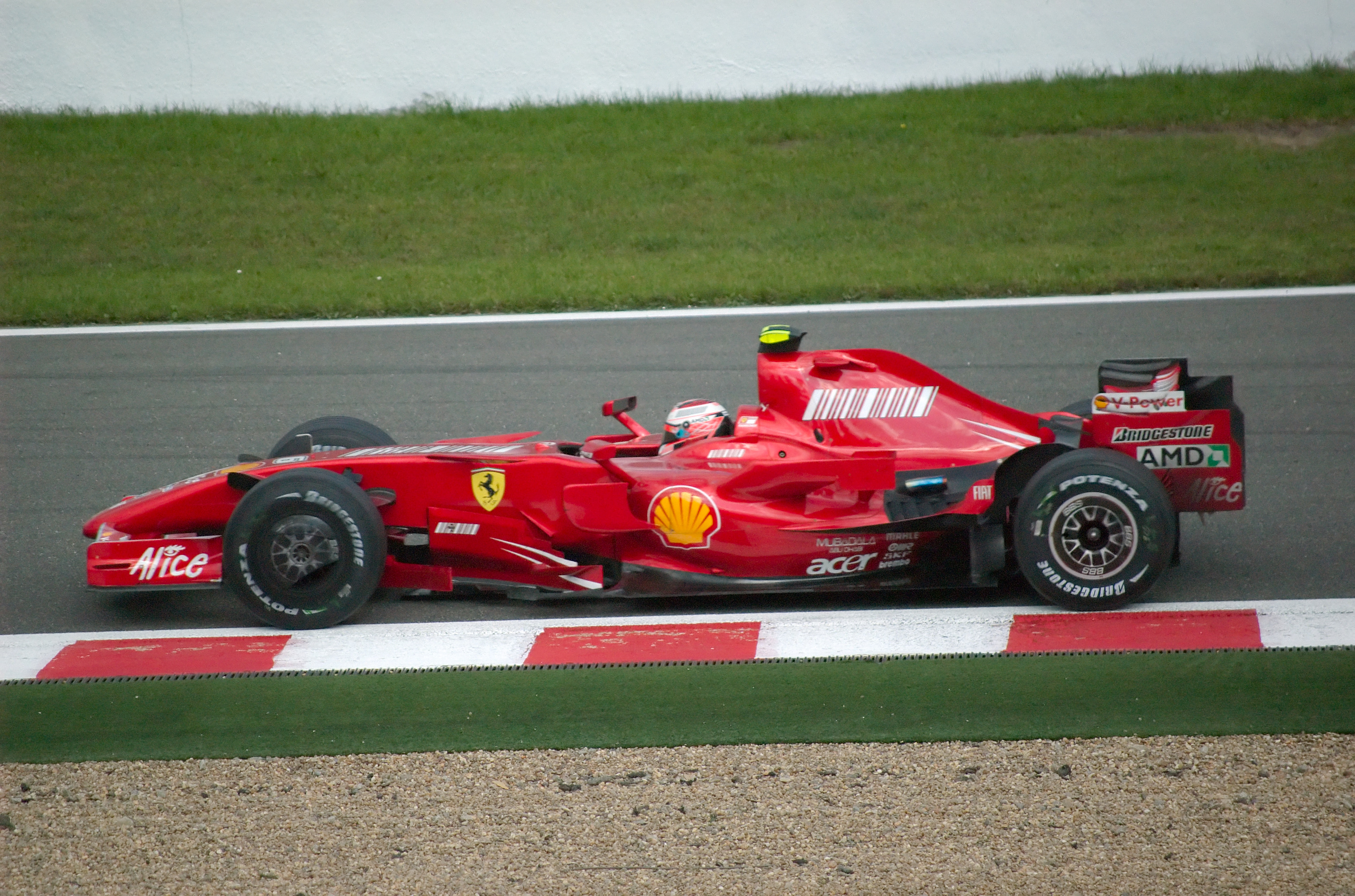
The race winner, Ferrari's Kimi Räikkönen.

The order from the start remained fairly unchanged with the Ferraris of Kimi Räikkönen and Felipe Massa led away from Fernando Alonso and Lewis Hamilton, although there was a lot of pushing between the McLarens as Hamilton attempted to pass around the outside of turn one, but Alonso pushed him wide onto the tarmac on the outside of the corner.

Giancarlo Fisichella's Renault suffered a suspension failure on lap 2, making him the first retirement of the race. He had been running last. Also on lap 2, Alexander Wurz spun in the Williams, slipping to the back of the field.

Sebastian Vettel soon suffered a handling problem, probably caused by a collision, which eliminated his Toro Rosso from the race on lap 9.

Massa briefly took the lead on lap 16, but Räikkönen reclaimed it a lap later after his pitstop.

David Coulthard suffered a hydraulic failure in his Red Bull on lap 30. He was quickly followed with a fuel pressure problem for Wurz, who was still last, on lap 35, and the Honda of Jenson Button, which dropped out on lap 37 with another hydraulic failure.

Massa once again led for just one lap during Räikkönen's second stop, but he retook it the following lap.

Räikkönen finally came home to win from Massa, clinching the World Constructors Championship for Ferrari. Alonso, Hamilton, Nick Heidfeld in the BMW Sauber, Nico Rosberg's Williams, Mark Webber in the Red Bull and Heikki Kovalainen's Renault rounded up the top eight. The only changes from the starting top eight were Heidfeld and Rosberg swapping places and Kovalainen passing Jarno Trulli's Toyota to take eighth.

The race was overshadowed by the death of former World Rally Champion Colin McRae in a helicopter crash during Saturday's qualifying.

== Classification ==
=== Qualifying ===
Pos.	No.	Driver	Constructor	Q1	Q2	Q3	Grid
1	6	(Finland) Kimi Räikkönen	Ferrari	1:46.242	1:45.070	1:45.994	1
2	5	(Brazil) Felipe Massa	Ferrari	1:46.060	1:45.173	1:46.011	2
3	1	(Spain) Fernando Alonso	McLaren-Mercedes	1:46.058	1:45.442	1:46.091	3
4	2	(United Kingdom) Lewis Hamilton	McLaren-Mercedes	1:46.437	1:45.132	1:46.406	4
5	10	(Poland) Robert Kubica	BMW Sauber	1:46.707	1:45.885	1:46.996	14^{1}
6	16	(Germany) Nico Rosberg	Williams-Toyota	1:46.950	1:46.469	1:47.334	5
7	9	(Germany) Nick Heidfeld	BMW Sauber	1:46.923	1:45.994	1:47.409	6
8	15	(Australia) Mark Webber	Red Bull-Renault	1:47.084	1:46.426	1:47.524	7
9	12	(Italy) Jarno Trulli	Toyota	1:47.143	1:46.480	1:47.798	8
10	4	(Finland) Heikki Kovalainen	Renault	1:46.971	1:46.240	1:48.505	9
11	3	(Italy) Giancarlo Fisichella	Renault	1:47.143	1:46.603		22
12	11	(Germany) Ralf Schumacher	Toyota	1:47.300	1:46.618		10
13	14	(United Kingdom) David Coulthard	Red Bull-Renault	1:47.340	1:46.800		11
14	7	(United Kingdom) Jenson Button	Honda	1:47.474	1:46.955		12
15	18	(Italy) Vitantonio Liuzzi	Toro Rosso-Ferrari	1:47.576	1:47.115		13
16	17	(Austria) Alexander Wurz	Williams-Toyota	1:47.522	1:47.394		15
17	19	(Germany) Sebastian Vettel	Toro Rosso-Ferrari	1:47.581			16
18	8	(Brazil) Rubens Barrichello	Honda	1:47.954			17
19	22	(Japan) Takuma Sato	Super Aguri-Honda	1:47.980			18
20	20	(Germany) Adrian Sutil	Spyker-Ferrari	1:48.044			19
21	23	(United Kingdom) Anthony Davidson	Super Aguri-Honda	1:48.199			20
22	21	(Japan) Sakon Yamamoto	Spyker-Ferrari	1:49.557			21

Notes

- ^1 – Robert Kubica dropped ten places for engine change.
- ^2 – Giancarlo Fisichella started at the back of the grid for an engine change after qualifying.

=== Race ===
Pos.	No.	Driver	Constructor	Laps	Time/Retired	Grid	Points
1	6	(Finland) Kimi Räikkönen	Ferrari	44	1:20:39.066	1	10
2	5	(Brazil) Felipe Massa	Ferrari	44	+4.695	2	8
3	1	(Spain) Fernando Alonso	McLaren-Mercedes	44	+14.343	3	6
4	2	(United Kingdom) Lewis Hamilton	McLaren-Mercedes	44	+23.615	4	5
5	9	(Germany) Nick Heidfeld	BMW Sauber	44	+51.879	6	4
6	16	(Germany) Nico Rosberg	Williams-Toyota	44	+1:16.876	5	3
7	15	(Australia) Mark Webber	Red Bull-Renault	44	+1:20.639	7	2
8	4	(Finland) Heikki Kovalainen	Renault	44	+1:25.106	9	1
9	10	(Poland) Robert Kubica	BMW Sauber	44	+1:25.661	14	
10	11	(Germany) Ralf Schumacher	Toyota	44	+1:28.574	10	
11	12	(Italy) Jarno Trulli	Toyota	44	+1:43.653	8	
12	18	(Italy) Vitantonio Liuzzi	Toro Rosso-Ferrari	43	+1 Lap	13	
13	8	(Brazil) Rubens Barrichello	Honda	43	+1 Lap	17	
14	20	(Germany) Adrian Sutil	Spyker-Ferrari	43	+1 Lap	19	
15	22	(Japan) Takuma Sato	Super Aguri-Honda	43	+1 Lap	18	
16	23	(United Kingdom) Anthony Davidson	Super Aguri-Honda	43	+1 Lap	PL^{4}	
17	21	(Japan) Sakon Yamamoto	Spyker-Ferrari	43	+1 Lap	21	
Ret	7	(United Kingdom) Jenson Button	Honda	36	Hydraulics	12	
Ret	17	(Austria) Alexander Wurz	Williams-Toyota	34	Fuel pressure	15	
Ret	14	(United Kingdom) David Coulthard	Red Bull-Renault	29	Hydraulics	11	
Ret	19	(Germany) Sebastian Vettel	Toro Rosso-Ferrari	8	Steering	16	
Ret	3	(Italy) Giancarlo Fisichella	Renault	1	Suspension	PL^{3}	

Notes

- ^3 – Giancarlo Fisichella "...elected to start from the pits with a lower-downforce set-up to try and enhance his chance of making up places."
- ^4 – Anthony Davidson "...started from the pit lane after experiencing a front-end problem on the grid out-lap."

== Championship standings after the race ==
Drivers' Championship standings

+/–	Pos.	Driver	Points
	1	(United Kingdom) **Lewis Hamilton***	97
	2	(Spain) **Fernando Alonso***	95
	3	(Finland) **Kimi Räikkönen***	84
	4	(Brazil) **Felipe Massa***	77
	5	(Germany) Nick Heidfeld	56

Constructors' Championship standings

+/–	Pos.	Constructor	Points
1	1	(Italy) **Ferrari**	161
1	2	(Germany) BMW Sauber	90
1	3	(France) Renault	39
1	4	(United Kingdom) Williams-Toyota	28
1	5	(Austria) Red Bull-Renault	18

- Note: Only the top five positions are included for both sets of standings.
- **Bold text** indicates the 2007 World Constructors' Champions.
- **Bold text** and an asterisk indicates competitors who still had a theoretical chance of becoming World Champion.

== See also ==
- 2007 Spa-Francorchamps GP2 Series round

Previous race: 2007 Italian Grand Prix	FIA Formula One World Championship; 2007 season	Next race: 2007 Japanese Grand Prix
Previous race: 2005 Belgian Grand Prix	Belgian Grand Prix	Next race: 2008 Belgian Grand Prix
