= Paul Gutjahr =

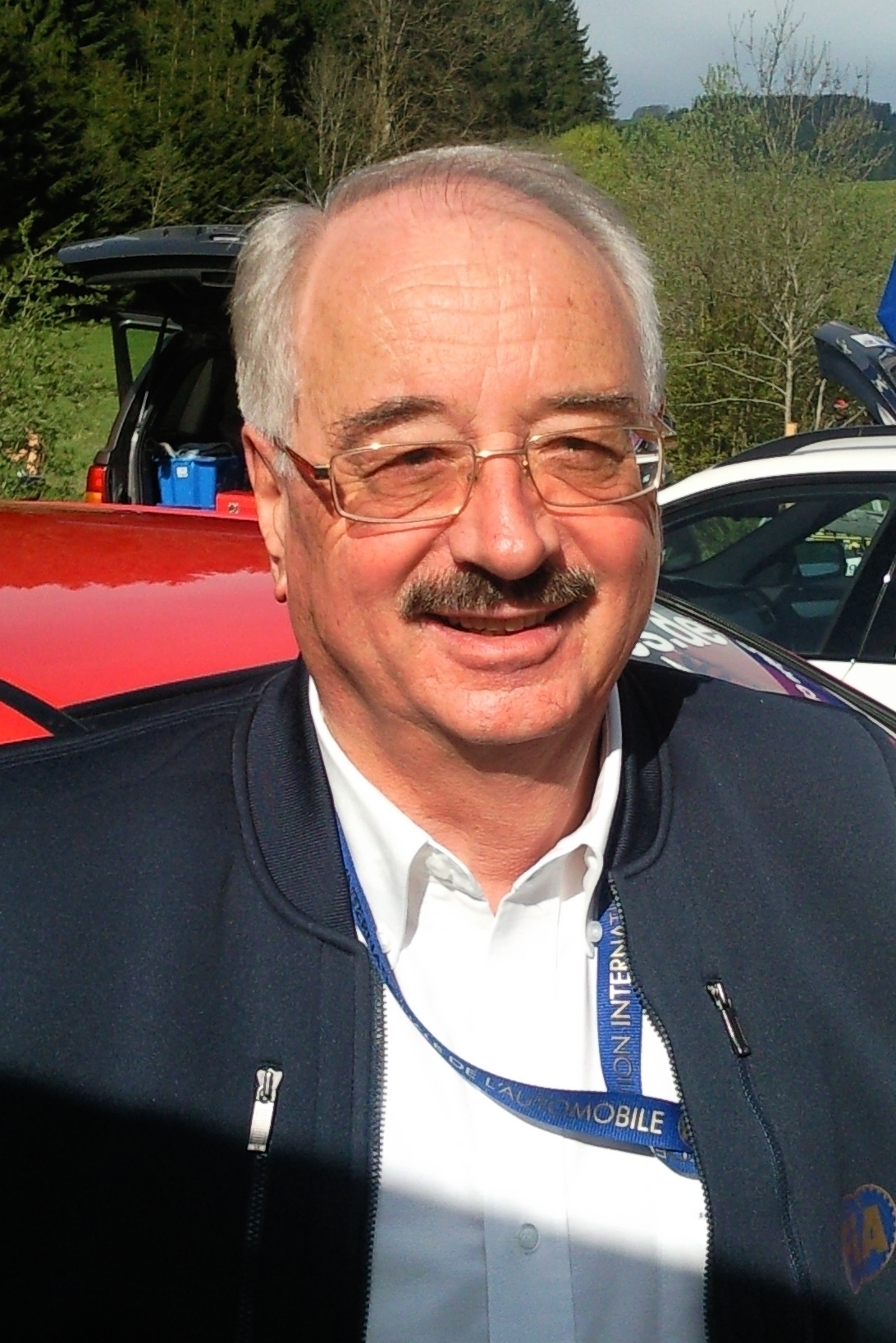
- Paul Gutjahr in 2013.
- Born: 1 November 1942 (age 83)
- Citizenship: Switzerland

Paul Gutjahr (born 1 November 1942) is a Swiss FIA Commissioner, businessman and racing driver. He is the Chairman of the FIA Hill Climb Commission, a member of the board and the Chairman of Auto Sport Suisse SARL.

== Career ==
Gutjahr has raced for Alfa Romeo, Lancia, Lotus and Porsche, and March in Formula 3. After retiring from motor racing as an active athlete, he became chairman of the Automobile Club Berne. He was chairman of the board of directors of the Swiss Grand Prix from 1980 to 1982.

He was chairman of the Swiss National Motorsports Federation from 1980 to 2005. Since then, he has focused on supervisory duties in addition to his chairmanship. He is chairman of the European Hill Climb Organisers and has been a supervisor in Formula One since 1995.
