= 2007 Italian Grand Prix =

Coordinates: 45°36′56″N 9°16′52″E

Race 13 of 17 in the 2007 Formula One World Championship
← Previous race	Next race →
- Autodromo Nazionale di Monza

Race details
- Date: 9 September 2007
- Official name: Formula 1 Gran Premio d'Italia 2007
- Location: Autodromo Nazionale di Monza, Monza, Italy
- Course: Permanent racing facility
- Course length: 5.793 km (3.6 miles)
- Distance: 53 laps, 306.720 km (190.58 miles)
- Weather: Sunny

Pole position
Driver	(Spain) Fernando Alonso	McLaren-Mercedes
- Time: 1:21.997

Fastest lap
Driver	(Spain) Fernando Alonso	McLaren-Mercedes
- Time: 1:22.871 on lap 15

Podium
First	(Spain) Fernando Alonso	McLaren-Mercedes
Second	(United Kingdom) Lewis Hamilton	McLaren-Mercedes
Third	(Finland) Kimi Räikkönen	Ferrari

The 2007 Italian Grand Prix (officially the Formula 1 Gran Premio d'Italia 2007) was a Formula One motor race held on 9 September 2007 at Autodromo Nazionale di Monza, Italy. It was the thirteenth race of the 2007 FIA Formula One World Championship.

Going into the race, McLaren's Lewis Hamilton held a 5-point lead over team-mate Fernando Alonso in the Drivers' Championship, whilst McLaren held an 11-point lead over Ferrari in the Constructors' Championship. Ferrari were expected to do well at home after a one-two finish in the Turkish GP and Michael Schumacher's victory at Monza the previous year. However, McLaren dominated the traditional test session prior to the Grand Prix, with Alonso topping the time sheets on two of the four days and Hamilton and Pedro de la Rosa fastest on the other days.

Fernando Alonso took his fourth win of the season, leading home the fourth one-two finish of the season for McLaren as Lewis Hamilton finished second. It was McLaren's eighth victory at Monza and Mercedes' fourth, while Alonso became the first Spaniard to win the Italian Grand Prix. It turned out to be his last win for McLaren, and McLaren's last 1-2 finish until the 2010 Chinese Grand Prix.

== Report ==
=== Qualifying ===
The two Spykers of Adrian Sutil and Sakon Yamamoto were both eliminated in Q1, along with Vitantonio Liuzzi in the Toro Rosso, Takuma Sato of Super Aguri, and, surprisingly, the Toyota of Ralf Schumacher and David Coulthard's Red Bull.

In the second session, both the Toro Rosso of Sebastian Vettel and Anthony Davidson's Super Aguri, who had done very well to make the session, were eliminated. So were Giancarlo Fisichella in the Renault, Alexander Wurz of Williams, the Honda of Rubens Barrichello and Coulthard's Red Bull teammate Mark Webber.

Jenson Button had done excellently to put the Honda in the top 10, and he qualified tenth, on the fifth row with Jarno Trulli's Toyota. Nico Rosberg qualified his Williams eighth, alongside the second Renault of Heikki Kovalainen, who had put in a brilliant performance. Robert Kubica took 6th in the BMW Sauber, while his teammate Nick Heidfeld broke the domination of the top 4 by McLaren and Ferrari, beating the Scuderia's Kimi Räikkönen to 4th. However, it was service as normal at the very front, with Räikkönen's teammate Felipe Massa taking 3rd, and the two McLarens of Lewis Hamilton and Fernando Alonso locking out the front row, with the Spaniard just pipping his younger teammate to pole by 0.037 of a second.

=== Race ===
The top three held station from the start, but Kimi Räikkönen's Ferrari jumped Nick Heidfeld in the BMW Sauber and moved into fourth. Jarno Trulli was a big loser in the Toyota, slipping from 9th to 13th, while the big winner was David Coulthard, who went from 20th to 15th in the Red Bull.

On lap 2, however, Coulthard crashed at Curva Grande, completely negating the influence of his brilliant start and with his car in a dangerous position the crash forced the safety car to be deployed. This allowed the Super Aguri of Anthony Davidson up into 15th.

The race's only other retirement was Räikkönen's teammate Felipe Massa, who retired with a suspension failure on lap 11 after running in third place. This allowed the Finn to move into third and Nico Rosberg to move into the points in his Williams.

Lewis Hamilton, running second in the McLaren, had flat-spotted his tyres earlier in the race and complained about vibration, raising fears that it might lead to a puncture similar to what happened previously in Turkey, so the team decided to play it safe and pit slightly earlier than scheduled, on lap 18, dropping Hamilton down to 6th place, behind Räikkönen, the two BMW Saubers of Heidfeld and Robert Kubica, and Heikki Kovalainen's Renault. Räikkönen then took the lead as Hamilton's teammate Fernando Alonso pitted from the lead on lap 20.

Hamilton moved back to third place, behind Räikkönen and Alonso, after the two BMW Saubers and Kovalainen pitted, but as the Ferrari driver emerged from his pitstop, Hamilton was still behind. With the extra grip provided by the softer tyres, Hamilton made a move down the inside of turn one to recover second place from Räikkönen, who didn't defend as he had the harder compound tyres and was still suffering from the neck injury he got during his practice accident. Alonso retained the lead.

There were no further changes at the front, and Alonso led home by six seconds from Hamilton, with Räikkönen completing the podium. Heidfeld finished in fourth just four seconds ahead of his teammate Kubica, with Rosberg still in close contention in sixth. Kovalainen was seventh, and Jenson Button rounded out the points in a rare foray into the points paying positions for the Honda team.

== Classification ==
=== Qualifying ===
Pos.	No.	Driver	Constructor	Q1	Q2	Q3	Grid
1	1	(Spain) Fernando Alonso	McLaren-Mercedes	1:21.718	1:21.356	1:21.997	1
2	2	(United Kingdom) Lewis Hamilton	McLaren-Mercedes	1:21.956	1:21.746	1:22.034	2
3	5	(Brazil) Felipe Massa	Ferrari	1:22.309	1:21.993	1:22.549	3
4	9	(Germany) Nick Heidfeld	BMW Sauber	1:23.107	1:22.466	1:23.174	4
5	6	(Finland) Kimi Räikkönen	Ferrari	1:22.673	1:22.369	1:23.183	5
6	10	(Poland) Robert Kubica	BMW Sauber	1:23.088	1:22.400	1:23.446	6
7	4	(Finland) Heikki Kovalainen	Renault	1:23.505	1:23.134	1:24.102	7
8	16	(Germany) Nico Rosberg	Williams-Toyota	1:23.333	1:22.748	1:24.382	8
9	12	(Italy) Jarno Trulli	Toyota	1:23.724	1:23.107	1:24.555	9
10	7	(United Kingdom) Jenson Button	Honda	1:23.639	1:23.021	1:25.165	10
11	15	(Australia) Mark Webber	Red Bull-Renault	1:23.575	1:23.166		11
12	8	(Brazil) Rubens Barrichello	Honda	1:23.474	1:23.176		12
13	17	(Austria) Alexander Wurz	Williams-Toyota	1:23.739	1:23.209		13
14	23	(United Kingdom) Anthony Davidson	Super Aguri-Honda	1:23.646	1:23.274		14
15	3	(Italy) Giancarlo Fisichella	Renault	1:23.559	1:23.325		15
16	19	(Germany) Sebastian Vettel	Toro Rosso-Ferrari	1:23.578	1:23.351		16
17	22	(Japan) Takuma Sato	Super Aguri-Honda	1:23.749			17
18	11	(Germany) Ralf Schumacher	Toyota	1:23.787			18
19	18	(Italy) Vitantonio Liuzzi	Toro Rosso-Ferrari	1:23.886			19
20	14	(United Kingdom) David Coulthard	Red Bull-Renault	1:24.019			20
21	20	(Germany) Adrian Sutil	Spyker-Ferrari	1:24.699			21
22	21	(Japan) Sakon Yamamoto	Spyker-Ferrari	1:25.084			22

=== Race ===
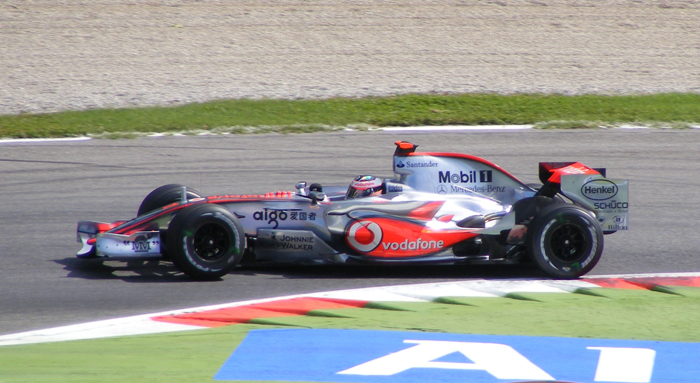
The race was won by Fernando Alonso for McLaren.

Pos.	No.	Driver	Constructor	Laps	Time/Retired	Grid	Points
1	1	(Spain) Fernando Alonso	McLaren-Mercedes	53	1:18:37.806	1	10
2	2	(United Kingdom) Lewis Hamilton	McLaren-Mercedes	53	+6.062	2	8
3	6	(Finland) Kimi Räikkönen	Ferrari	53	+27.325	5	6
4	9	(Germany) Nick Heidfeld	BMW Sauber	53	+56.562	4	5
5	10	(Poland) Robert Kubica	BMW Sauber	53	+1:00.558	6	4
6	16	(Germany) Nico Rosberg	Williams-Toyota	53	+1:05.810	8	3
7	4	(Finland) Heikki Kovalainen	Renault	53	+1:06.751	7	2
8	7	(United Kingdom) Jenson Button	Honda	53	+1:12.168	10	1
9	15	(Australia) Mark Webber	Red Bull-Renault	53	+1:15.879	11	
10	8	(Brazil) Rubens Barrichello	Honda	53	+1:16.958	12	
11	12	(Italy) Jarno Trulli	Toyota	53	+1:17.736	9	
12	3	(Italy) Giancarlo Fisichella	Renault	52	+1 lap	15	
13	17	(Austria) Alexander Wurz	Williams-Toyota	52	+1 lap	13	
14	23	(United Kingdom) Anthony Davidson	Super Aguri-Honda	52	+1 lap	14	
15	11	(Germany) Ralf Schumacher	Toyota	52	+1 lap	18	
16	22	(Japan) Takuma Sato	Super Aguri-Honda	52	+1 lap	17	
17	18	(Italy) Vitantonio Liuzzi	Toro Rosso-Ferrari	52	+1 lap	19	
18	19	(Germany) Sebastian Vettel	Toro Rosso-Ferrari	52	+1 lap	16	
19	20	(Germany) Adrian Sutil	Spyker-Ferrari	52	+1 lap	21	
20	21	(Japan) Sakon Yamamoto	Spyker-Ferrari	52	+1 lap	22	
Ret	5	(Brazil) Felipe Massa	Ferrari	10	Suspension	3	
Ret	14	(United Kingdom) David Coulthard	Red Bull-Renault	1	Accident	20	

== Championship standings after the race ==
Drivers' Championship standings

+/–	Pos.	Driver	Points
	1	(United Kingdom) Lewis Hamilton*	92
	2	(Spain) Fernando Alonso*	89
1	3	(Finland) Kimi Räikkönen*	74
1	4	(Brazil) Felipe Massa*	69
	5	(Germany) Nick Heidfeld*	52

Constructors' Championship standings

+/–	Pos.	Constructor	Points
	1	(United Kingdom) McLaren-Mercedes*	166
	2	(Italy) Ferrari*	143
	3	(Germany) BMW Sauber	86
	4	(France) Renault	38
	5	(United Kingdom) Williams-Toyota	25

- Note: Only the top five positions are included for both sets of standings. Constructors' Championship standings accurate as at final declaration of race results. McLaren was subsequently excluded from the championship.
- Bold text and an asterisk indicates competitors who still had a theoretical chance of becoming World Champion.

== See also ==
- 2007 Monza GP2 Series round

Previous race: 2007 Turkish Grand Prix	FIA Formula One World Championship; 2007 season	Next race: 2007 Belgian Grand Prix
Previous race: 2006 Italian Grand Prix	Italian Grand Prix	Next race: 2008 Italian Grand Prix
