= 2006 Laguna Seca A1GP round =

2005-06 A1GP of United States of America

Race Details
- Race 10 of 11 in the 2005-06 A1 Grand Prix season
- Date: March 12, 2006
- Location: Mazda Raceway Laguna Seca; Salinas, United States
- Weather: Rain during Sprint race, further fine

Qualifying
- Pole: Mexico (Salvador Durán)
- Time: 2'30.744 (, )

Sprint Race
- 1st: Mexico (Salvador Durán)
- 2nd: France (Nicolas Lapierre)
- 3rd: Portugal (Alvaro Parente)

Main Race
- 1st: Mexico (Salvador Durán)
- 2nd: Germany (Timo Scheider)
- 3rd: Great Britain (Robbie Kerr)

Fast Lap
- FL: France (Nicolas Lapierre)
- Time: 1'17.951, (Lap 27 of Main Race)

Official Classifications

Layout of the Laguna Seca

The 2005–06 A1 Grand Prix of Nations, United States of America was an A1 Grand Prix race, held on the weekend of March 12, 2006 at Laguna Seca.

== Report ==
The first American stop for the A1GP (and so far only) was doomed to fail from the start. The race was announced before Laguna Seca announced it. There was little to no advertisement for the event, and very few fans of European open wheel racing in America even knew about the event. Due to constant rain, the A1GP weekend was canceled by the track a week before the race. The rain stopped, but the ground was still soaked to the point that most of the parking lots were closed in fear of vehicles getting stuck in the mud. Laguna Seca is located just a few miles from the Monterey Bay, and is at an elevation of about 750 feet. The weather chased away more fans as snow fell on Friday night.

Fewer than 2000 people (estimate) attended the race.

=== Qualifying ===
Qualifying was held in "ideal" conditions compared to the rest of the weekend and the lap times were quick.

=== Sprint race ===
With rain nearby, officials changed the start times for both races. Temperatures were in the 40s, and the diehard fans were in for quite a show. Less than five minutes before the start, a torrent rain storm hit the track hard. Teams quickly switched to rain tires and put on a great show. By the halfway point of the 30 minute sprint race, the rain stopped, yet there was enough water that a dry line could not be found.

=== Main race ===
By the start of the main race, the track was mostly dry, however there were enough wet spots on the track to make it dangerous for slicks. Many cars spun hitting the wet curbs. There were also some questionable calls by the officials causing Jos Verstappen to storm out of his car in the middle of the race.

== Results ==
=== Qualifying Results ===
Qualifying took place on Saturday, March 11, 2006.

1. Mexico Salvador Duran 2min 30.744secs 2. France Nicolas Lapierre 2min 30.895secs 3. New Zealand Matt Halliday 2min 31.596secs 4. Malaysia Alex Yoong 2min 31.810secs 5. Australia Ryan Briscoe 2min 31.964secs 6. Great Britain Robbie Kerr 2min 31.970secs 7. Portugal Alvaro Parente 2min 32.042secs 8. Ireland Ralph Firman 2min 32.098secs 9. Germany Timo Scheider 2min 32.307secs 10. South Africa Stephen Simpson 2min 32.535secs 11. Lebanon Graham Rahal 2min 32.560secs 12. Netherlands Jos Verstappen 2min 32.571secs 13. Italy Max Papis 2min 32.745secs 14. Czech Republic Tomáš Enge 2min 32.838secs 15. Indonesia Ananda Mikola 2min 33.249secs 16. Switzerland Giorgio Mondini 2min 33.299secs 17. USA Bryan Herta 2min 33.602secs 18. Canada Patrick Carpentier 2min 33.641secs 19. Brazil Christian Fittipaldi 2min 33.686secs 20. Austria Mathias Lauda 2min 34.338secs 21. Pakistan Adam Khan 2min 36.325secs 22. China Tengyi Jiang 2min 37.715secs

=== Sprint Race Results ===
The Sprint Race took place on Sunday, March 12, 2006.

Pos	Team	Driver	Laps	Time	Points
1	Mexico	Salvador Durán	16	31:07.422	20
2	France	Nicolas Lapierre	16	+1.771	10
3	Portugal	Alvaro Parente	16	+8.040	18
4	(United Kingdom) Great Britain	Robbie Kerr	16	+12.791	15
5	(Republic of Ireland) Ireland	Ralph Firman	16	+24.390	11
6	Canada	Patrick Carpentier	16	+26.027	11
7	Germany	Timo Scheider	16	+26.416	13
8	New Zealand	Matt Halliday	16	+30.474	3
9	United States	Bryan Herta	16	+31.034	2
10	Australia	Ryan Briscoe	16	+34.647	4
11	South Africa	Stephen Simpson	16	+35.971	
12	Austria	Mathias Lauda	16	+51.760	
13	Brazil	Christian Fittipaldi	16	+54.200	
14	Netherlands	Jos Verstappen	16	+55.266	
15	Pakistan	Adam Khan	16	+57.676	
16	Switzerland	Giorgio Mondini	16	+1'00.478	
17	China	Tengyi Jiang	16	+1'13.008	
18	Czech Republic	Tomáš Enge	15	+1 Lap	
19	Italy	Max Papis	15	+1 Lap	
20	Indonesia	Ananda Mikola	12	+4 Laps	
21	Lebanon	Graham Rahal	9	+7 Laps	
22	Malaysia	Alex Yoong	7	+9 Laps	

=== Main Race Results ===
The Main Race took place on Sunday, March 12, 2006.

1. Mexico Salvador Duran 1 h 0 min 52.974 s; 40 laps 2. Germany Timo Scheider +2.042 s 3. Great Britain Robbie Kerr +3.117 s 4. Portugal Alvaro Parente +10.420 s 5. Canada Patrick Carpentier +14.183 s 6. Ireland Ralph Firman +20.805 s 7. Italy Max Papis +23.199 s 8. Australia Ryan Briscoe +24.236 s 9. Austria Mathias Lauda +29.229 s 10. Malaysia Alex Yoong +30.072 s 11. Pakistan Adam Khan +31.391 s 12. New Zealand Matt Halliday +31.977 s 13. Switzerland Giorgio Mondini +2 laps 14. France Nicolas Lapierre +3 laps 15. USA Bryan Herta +3 laps 16. Czech Republic Tomáš Enge +6 laps 17. China Tengyi Jiang +7 laps 18. Brazil Christian Fittipaldi +11 laps 19. Indonesia Ananda Mikola +12 laps 20. Lebanon Graham Rahal +13 laps 21. Netherlands Jos Verstappen +23 laps 22. South Africa Stephen Simpson +37 laps

Previous race 2005-06 A1GP, Mexico	A1 Grand Prix; 2005-06 season	Next race 2005-06 A1GP, China
