= 2007 Turkish Grand Prix =

Coordinates: 40°57′20.5″N 29°24′29.7″E

Race 12 of 17 in the 2007 Formula One World Championship
← Previous race	Next race →

Race details
- Date: 26 August 2007
- Official name: 2007 Formula 1 Petrol Ofisi Turkish Grand Prix
- Location: Istanbul Racing Circuit, Tuzla, Turkey
- Course: Permanent racing facility
- Course length: 5.338 km (3.317 miles)
- Distance: 58 laps, 309.396 km (192.250 miles)
- Weather: Sunny
- Attendance: 65,000

Pole position
Driver	(Brazil) Felipe Massa	Ferrari
- Time: 1:27.329

Fastest lap
Driver	(Finland) Kimi Räikkönen	Ferrari
- Time: 1:27.295 on lap 57

Podium
First	(Brazil) Felipe Massa	Ferrari
Second	(Finland) Kimi Räikkönen	Ferrari
Third	(Spain) Fernando Alonso	McLaren-Mercedes

The 2007 Turkish Grand Prix (officially the 2007 Formula 1 Petrol Ofisi Turkish Grand Prix) was the twelfth race of the 2007 FIA Formula One World Championship. Won by Felipe Massa, it was held on 26 August 2007 at the Istanbul Park in Tuzla. It was the third time a Formula One race had been held here. The two previous winners of the race were Kimi Räikkönen in 2005 and Massa in 2006, both of whom race for Ferrari in 2007.

It came following considerable controversy after the 2006 event, where the organisers were fined $5,000,000 for political bias, due to their choice of Mehmet Ali Talat to present the winner's trophy. Talat is President of the Turkish Cypriot state, which is not an internationally recognised government. This was seen by the governing body of Formula One as having compromised their neutrality.

Lewis Hamilton came into the race with a 7-point lead over McLaren teammate Fernando Alonso after Hamilton's controversial victory in the 2007 Hungarian Grand Prix. McLaren led Ferrari in the constructors' championship by 19 points despite not being allowed to score points in Hungary. However, the Ferrari had looked strong in recent weeks, and their two cars ultimately dominated the race from start to finish, Massa and Räikkönen taking first and second places respectively. A late puncture dropped Hamilton to fifth place and cut his championship lead over Alonso to five points.

During the press conference following the race, Massa commented that "the Istanbul Park was the track where he made his career turn-around, and finally began winning races." He also praised the track as well as the city.

== Report ==
=== Race ===
Felipe Massa's Ferrari led from pole from teammate Kimi Räikkönen who had jumped McLaren's Lewis Hamilton off the grid to take second place. Reigning World Champion Fernando Alonso's start from fourth was even worse than teammate Hamilton's as he fell behind both BMW Saubers of Robert Kubica and Nick Heidfeld into sixth. However, BMW's early stopping strategy led to Alonso taking both places back after the first round of pit-stops. At the first round of stops it seemed that Räikkönen could pass Massa if he stopped later, as he did at the French Grand Prix. However, Massa stopped after Räikkönen to retain the lead. Hamilton stopped later than both Ferraris and caught several seconds up to them, but could not pass Räikkönen for second, as he gradually fell away. Meanwhile, Kubica's strategy had not only dropped him behind Heidfeld and Alonso, but Renault's Heikki Kovalainen too. Massa stopped later than Räikkönen again at the second pit stop, and therefore retained the lead as Ferrari called the race between teammates off at this point. Hamilton may have emerged ahead of Räikkönen, but a puncture in his front tyre dropped him to fifth behind Heidfeld and Alonso. Damage to his front wing led to Kovalainen catching him, but the Finn was unable to pass Hamilton. Kubica lost a place to Nico Rosberg through strategy finishing eighth. Massa eventually won his second consecutive Turkish Grand Prix, and his fifth Grand Prix win overall, all of which came from pole position. He had secured his eighth pole in qualifying. Mark Webber of Red Bull Racing was the only non-classified car, with a hydraulic failure. All the rest were classified including Adrian Sutil who retired with a fuel pressure problem. Scuderia Toro Rosso driver Vitantonio Liuzzi ended a run of 9 consecutive retirements stretching back to the Bahrain Grand Prix in April.

== Classification ==
=== Qualifying ===
Pos.	No.	Driver	Constructor	Q1	Q2	Q3	Grid
1	5	(Brazil) Felipe Massa	Ferrari	1:27.488	1:27.039	1:27.329	1
2	2	(United Kingdom) Lewis Hamilton	McLaren-Mercedes	1:27.513	1:26.936	1:27.373	2
3	6	(Finland) Kimi Räikkönen	Ferrari	1:27.294	1:26.902	1:27.546	3
4	1	(Spain) Fernando Alonso	McLaren-Mercedes	1:27.328	1:26.841	1:27.574	4
5	10	(Poland) Robert Kubica	BMW Sauber	1:27.997	1:27.253	1:27.722	5
6	9	(Germany) Nick Heidfeld	BMW Sauber	1:28.099	1:27.253	1:28.037	6
7	4	(Finland) Heikki Kovalainen	Renault	1:28.127	1:27.039	1:28.491	7
8	16	(Germany) Nico Rosberg	Williams-Toyota	1:28.275	1:27.750	1:28.501	8
9	12	(Italy) Jarno Trulli	Toyota	1:28.318	1:27.801	1:28.740	9
10	3	(Italy) Giancarlo Fisichella	Renault	1:28.313	1:27.880	1:29.322	10
11	23	(United Kingdom) Anthony Davidson	Super Aguri-Honda	1:28.304	1:28.002		11
12	15	(Australia) Mark Webber	Red Bull-Renault	1:28.500	1:28.013		12
13	14	(United Kingdom) David Coulthard	Red Bull-Renault	1:28.395	1:28.100		13
14	8	(Brazil) Rubens Barrichello	Honda	1:28.792	1:28.188		22^{1}
15	7	(United Kingdom) Jenson Button	Honda	1:28.373	1:28.220		21^{2}
16	17	(Austria) Alexander Wurz	Williams-Toyota	1:28.360	1:28.390		14
17	18	(Italy) Vitantonio Liuzzi	Toro Rosso-Ferrari	1:28.798			15
18	11	(Germany) Ralf Schumacher	Toyota	1:28.809			16
19	22	(Japan) Takuma Sato	Super Aguri-Honda	1:28.953			17
20	19	(Germany) Sebastian Vettel	Toro Rosso-Ferrari	1:29.408			18
21	20	(Germany) Adrian Sutil	Spyker-Ferrari	1:29.861			19
22	21	(Japan) Sakon Yamamoto	Spyker-Ferrari	1:31.479			20

Notes

- ^1 – Rubens Barrichello was given a ten-place grid penalty for an engine change before the race.
- ^2 – Jenson Button was given a ten-place grid penalty for an engine change after qualifying.

=== Race ===
Pos.	No.	Driver	Constructor	Laps	Time/Retired	Grid	Points
1	5	(Brazil) Felipe Massa	Ferrari	58	1:26:42.161	1	10
2	6	(Finland) Kimi Räikkönen	Ferrari	58	+2.275	3	8
3	1	(Spain) Fernando Alonso	McLaren-Mercedes	58	+26.181	4	6
4	9	(Germany) Nick Heidfeld	BMW Sauber	58	+39.674	6	5
5	2	(United Kingdom) Lewis Hamilton	McLaren-Mercedes	58	+45.085	2	4
6	4	(Finland) Heikki Kovalainen	Renault	58	+46.169	7	3
7	16	(Germany) Nico Rosberg	Williams-Toyota	58	+55.778	8	2
8	10	(Poland) Robert Kubica	BMW Sauber	58	+56.707	5	1
9	3	(Italy) Giancarlo Fisichella	Renault	58	+59.491	10	
10	14	(United Kingdom) David Coulthard	Red Bull-Renault	58	+1:11.009	13	
11	17	(Austria) Alexander Wurz	Williams-Toyota	58	+1:19.628	14	
12	11	(Germany) Ralf Schumacher	Toyota	57	+1 Lap	16	
13	7	(United Kingdom) Jenson Button	Honda	57	+1 Lap	21	
14	23	(United Kingdom) Anthony Davidson	Super Aguri-Honda	57	+1 Lap	11	
15	18	(Italy) Vitantonio Liuzzi	Toro Rosso-Ferrari	57	+1 Lap	15	
16	12	(Italy) Jarno Trulli	Toyota	57	+1 Lap	9	
17	8	(Brazil) Rubens Barrichello	Honda	57	+1 Lap	22	
18	22	(Japan) Takuma Sato	Super Aguri-Honda	57	+1 Lap	17	
19	19	(Germany) Sebastian Vettel	Toro Rosso-Ferrari	57	+1 Lap	18	
20	21	(Japan) Sakon Yamamoto	Spyker-Ferrari	56	+2 Laps	20	
21	20	(Germany) Adrian Sutil	Spyker-Ferrari	53	Fuel pressure	19	
Ret	15	(Australia) Mark Webber	Red Bull-Renault	9	Hydraulics	12	

== Championship standings after the race ==
Drivers' Championship standings

+/–	Pos.	Driver	Points
	1	(United Kingdom) Lewis Hamilton*	84
	2	(Spain) Fernando Alonso*	79
1	3	(Brazil) Felipe Massa*	69
1	4	(Finland) Kimi Räikkönen*	68
	5	(Germany) Nick Heidfeld*	47

Constructors' Championship standings

+/–	Pos.	Constructor	Points
	1	(United Kingdom) McLaren-Mercedes*	148
	2	(Italy) Ferrari*	137
	3	(Germany) BMW Sauber*	77
	4	(France) Renault	36
	5	(United Kingdom) Williams-Toyota	22

- Note: Only the top five positions are included for both sets of standings.
- Bold text and an asterisk indicates competitors who still had a theoretical chance of becoming World Champion.

== See also ==
- 2007 Istanbul Park GP2 Series round

Previous race: 2007 Hungarian Grand Prix	FIA Formula One World Championship; 2007 season	Next race: 2007 Italian Grand Prix
Previous race: 2006 Turkish Grand Prix	Turkish Grand Prix	Next race: 2008 Turkish Grand Prix
