= Jens Marquardt =

German motor sports engineer (born 1967)

- Born: 20 May 1967 (age 59)

Jens Uwe Marquardt (born in Sindelfingen, Germany, at 20 May 1967), is a German motor sports engineer and manager, most recently the business development manager of Toyota Motorsport GmbH.

== Career ==
After gaining a degree in aerospace technology, he joined Ilmor Engineering in 1996, developing both Formula One and CART engines. In 2000 he joined Toyota Motorsport, initially working on engine design and development, before becoming F1 Operations and Team Manager in 2008. After Toyota exited Formula 1 at the end of the 2009 season, he was as General Manager Business Development, Operations & Production.

Marquardt joined BMW as co-director of its motorsport division on 1 January 2011, before replacing the retiring Mario Theissen on 1 July.

Marquardt oversaw BMW domination in the DTM with BMW taking the manufacturers' title, teams' title with BMW Team Schnitzer, and drivers' title with Bruno Spengler.
