= Robert Kubica =

Polish racing and rally driver (born 1984)

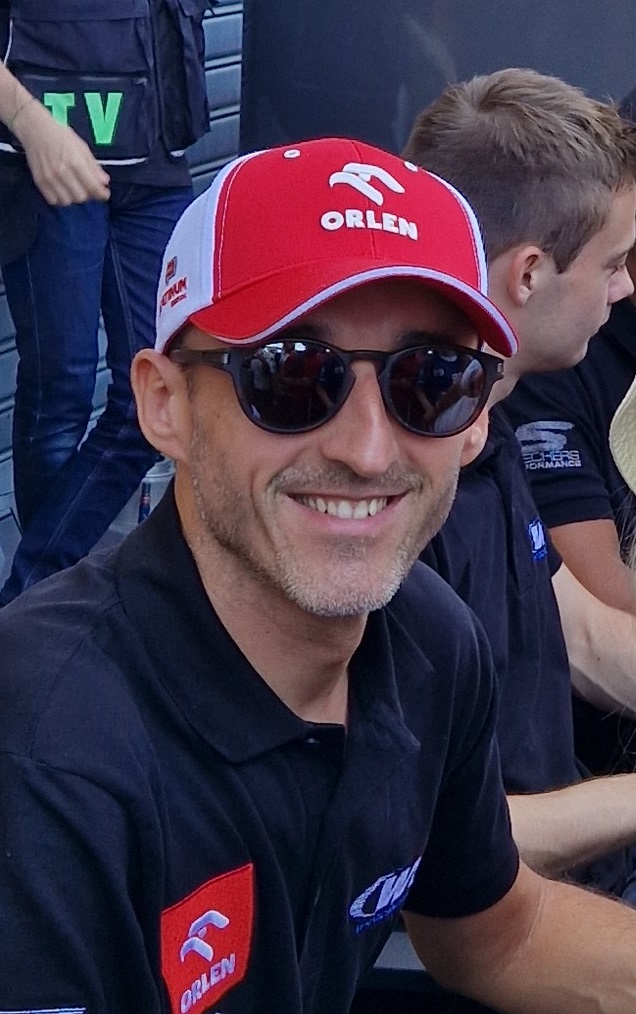
- Kubica in 2023
- Born: Robert Józef Kubica; 7 December 1984 (age 41); Kraków, Poland

FIA World Endurance Championship career
- Debut season: 2019
- Current team: AF Corse
- Categorisation: FIA Platinum
- Car number: 83
- Former teams: HCR, Prema, WRT
- Starts: 39 (39 entries)
- Championships: 1 (2023)
- Wins: 5
- Podiums: 10
- Poles: 1
- Fastest laps: 0
- Best finish: 1st in 2023 (LMP2)

European Le Mans Series career
- Debut season: 2021
- Current team: AO
- Car number: 14
- Former teams: WRT
- Starts: 12
- Championships: 2 (2021, 2024)
- Wins: 4
- Podiums: 8
- Poles: 1
- Fastest laps: 0
- Best finish: 1st in 2021, 2024 (LMP2)

Formula One World Championship career
- Nationality: (Poland) Polish
- Active years: 2006–2010, 2019, 2021
- Team(s): BMW Sauber, Renault, Williams, Alfa Romeo
- Car number: 88
- Entries: 99 (99 starts)
- Championships: 0
- Wins: 1
- Podiums: 12
- Career points: 274
- Pole positions: 1
- Fastest laps: 1
- First entry: 2006 Hungarian Grand Prix
- First win: 2008 Canadian Grand Prix
- Last entry: 2021 Italian Grand Prix

World Rally Championship record
- Years active: 2013–2016
- Co-driver: (Poland) Maciej Baran (Italy) Michele Ferrara (Poland) Maciej Szczepaniak
- Teams: M-Sport, Citroën
- Rallies: 33
- Championships: 1 (WRC2 2013)
- Rally wins: 5 (WRC2)
- Podiums: 6 (WRC2)
- Stage wins: 14
- Total points: 43
- First rally: 2013 Rally de Portugal
- Last rally: 2016 Monte Carlo Rally

24 Hours of Le Mans career
- Years: 2021–2025
- Teams: WRT, Prema, AF Corse
- Best finish: 1st (2025)

Awards
- 2008: Lorenzo Bandini Trophy

Robert Józef Kubica ( Polish: [ˈrɔbɛrt kuˈbit͡sa]; born 7 December 1984) is a Polish racing and rally driver who most recently competed in the FIA World Endurance Championship for AF Corse. He competed in Formula One between 2006 and 2010, and again in 2019 and 2021, and the WRC from 2013 to 2016. He won the 2008 Canadian Grand Prix with BMW Sauber, and remains the only Polish driver to compete in Formula One. In endurance racing, Kubica won the 2025 24 Hours of Le Mans for AF Corse, as well as three LMP2 titles across WEC and ELMS.

Kubica graduated from junior formulae after winning the 2005 Formula Renault 3.5 Series. He was promoted to Formula One mid-2006, and drove for BMW Sauber until 2009. Kubica took his only F1 victory at the 2008 Canadian Grand Prix — also the only win for Sauber — and led the championship briefly, before finishing fourth overall, his best career position. He drove for Renault in 2010 and was set to remain with the team in 2011.

On 6 February 2011, Kubica was seriously injured in a crash at the Ronde di Andora rally, in which he suffered partial amputation to his forearm, and fractures on his right elbow, shoulder, and leg. He told Italian newspaper La Gazzetta dello Sport in a bedside interview that he could feel the fingers in his right hand and was determined to make a swift return to Formula One in 2011. However, after rehabilitation, he said that a return to F1 would be "nearly impossible". Several years later, Kubica revealed that he had signed a pre-contract with Ferrari for the 2012 season, a move that was eventually ruled out by his crash injuries.

Kubica returned to rallying in September 2012, winning a minor rally in Italy. He was named one of "The Men of the Year 2012" by Top Gear magazine for his return to auto racing. In 2013, he drove for Citroën in the European and WRC2 Championships. He went on to win the inaugural WRC-2 title, and moved to the World Rally Championship full-time in 2014, driving a Ford Fiesta RS WRC prepared by M-Sport.

Kubica later took part in LMP1 tests with ByKolles, Formula One tests with Renault, and served as Williams reserve driver in 2018. He returned to the F1 grid in 2019, scoring Williams' only points of the year. Kubica moved across to the DTM for 2020, but maintained an F1 presence as test and reserve driver for Alfa Romeo. He replaced Kimi Räikkönen at the Dutch and Italian Grands Prix in 2021.

Kubica competed in LMP2 between 2021 and 2024, winning the European Le Mans Series twice and the FIA World Endurance Championship once. He made his Hypercar debut in 2024, driving the No. 83 Ferrari 499P for AF Corse. Kubica won the 24 Hours of Le Mans overall in 2025 alongside Phil Hanson and Yifei Ye, having spent 10 hours in the car.

== Early career ==
=== Karting ===
When he was four years old, Kubica saw a small off-road vehicle, powered by a 4 bhp (3.0 kW) petrol engine. His father Artur bought him the car, and Kubica spent long hours driving around plastic bottles. His father later bought him a go-kart, and Kubica began racing in the Polish Karting Championship when he reached the age of ten. When he entered the championship, he won six titles in three years. After his third season, he decided to switch to a more competitive series in Italy. In 1998, he became the first foreigner to win the International Italian Junior Karting Championship.

Kubica also scored second place in the European Junior Karting Championship and won the Junior Monaco Kart Cup held on part of the Formula One Grand Prix track. A year later, he defended his title in Italy and also competed in the International German Karting Championship. He also won the Monaco Kart Cup for the second time in a row, as well as the Andrea Margutti Trophy and Elf Masters races. In 2000, his last season in karting, Kubica scored fourth places in both the European and World Championships.

=== Junior formulae ===
==== 2000–2002: Formula Renault 2.0 ====
Kubica started his professional career in 2000, as a test driver for a Formula Renault 2000 car. During his first professional season in Formula Renault, Kubica scored his maiden pole position and also became a member of Renault's driver development programme. In 2002, Kubica won four races and scored a second place in the Italian Formula Renault 2000. He was also seventh in the Formula Renault Eurocup. At the end of the year, he took part in a Brazilian Formula Renault 2000 race held at the Interlagos circuit. This one-off appearance resulted in a dominant win.

==== 2003–2004: Formula Three ====
After Formula Renault, Kubica moved to the Formula 3 Euro Series. However, his move was delayed by a road accident which left him with a broken arm, and titanium screws holding it together. At his delayed debut at Norisring, Kubica, driving with a plastic brace and eighteen titanium bolts in his arm, won the race. He finished the season in 12th place. At the end of the year, Kubica won a street race in Sardinia and came fifth in races held in Macau and Korea. He ended his second season in the Formula 3 Euro Series, spent with the factory Mercedes team, in seventh position. In November 2004, he scored pole position in the Macau F3 Grand Prix, where he broke the lap record, but finished second in the race.

==== 2005: Formula Renault 3.5 ====
In 2005, Kubica won the World Series by Renault championship with the Epsilon Euskadi team, earning Formula One tests with Renault.

== Formula One career ==
=== Test driver ===
Kubica was due to drive Minardi's third car in Friday practice for the 2005 Japanese or Chinese GP, but he did not get the FIA Super License required to drive. Kubica made a one-off test for Renault in December 2005 at the Circuit de Barcelona-Catalunya.

=== BMW Sauber (2006–2009) ===
==== 2006–2007: First Polish F1 driver and injury ====
In 2006, Kubica became the official reserve driver for the BMW Sauber Formula One team. His results in both Friday testing and private test sessions, along with the words of BMW Sauber team principal Mario Theissen, led to speculation that he would become Poland's first ever Formula One racing driver in 2007. In August 2006, Kubica's teammate, Jacques Villeneuve, complained about headaches after his accident during the German Grand Prix; he was deemed unfit to race by the team, against his own belief, and Kubica was chosen by the team management to replace him at the Hungarian Grand Prix. Kubica qualified ninth, beating his more experienced teammate Nick Heidfeld. In the race, he finished in seventh place, but was disqualified after the race for having an underweight car. Villeneuve decided to leave the BMW Sauber team soon after the race, and Kubica's position in the team for the remainder of the season was confirmed by BMW.

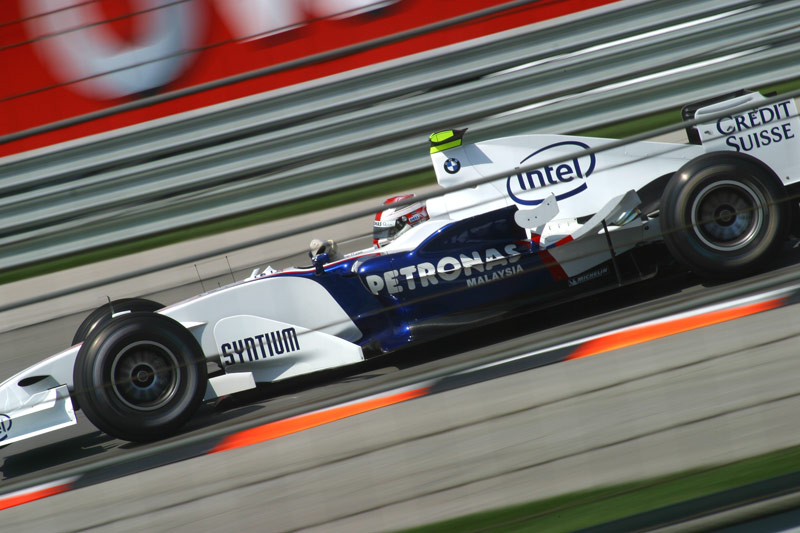
Kubica as BMW Sauber's third driver at the 2006 United States Grand Prix

Kubica had a disappointing race at the Turkish Grand Prix, finishing in 12th place after a mistake in tyre choice. Heidfeld, who was delayed in a first-corner accident, placed behind Kubica. In his third race, the Italian Grand Prix, Kubica finished in third position, and became the first Polish driver to appear on a Formula One podium, as well as the first Polish driver to lead a Grand Prix. He was the first driver since Alexander Wurz in 1997 to finish on the podium within his first three Formula One starts.

In China, he finished 13th, again after a mistake in tyre choice. After going off track at the first turn of the race, he moved from 17th position to fifth, before pitting. He was the first to change from intermediate tyres to dry tyres after the wet track started to dry. This decision was made too early: a very slow next lap in extremely wet and slippery conditions and another pit stop to change back to intermediates cost him his place in the points.

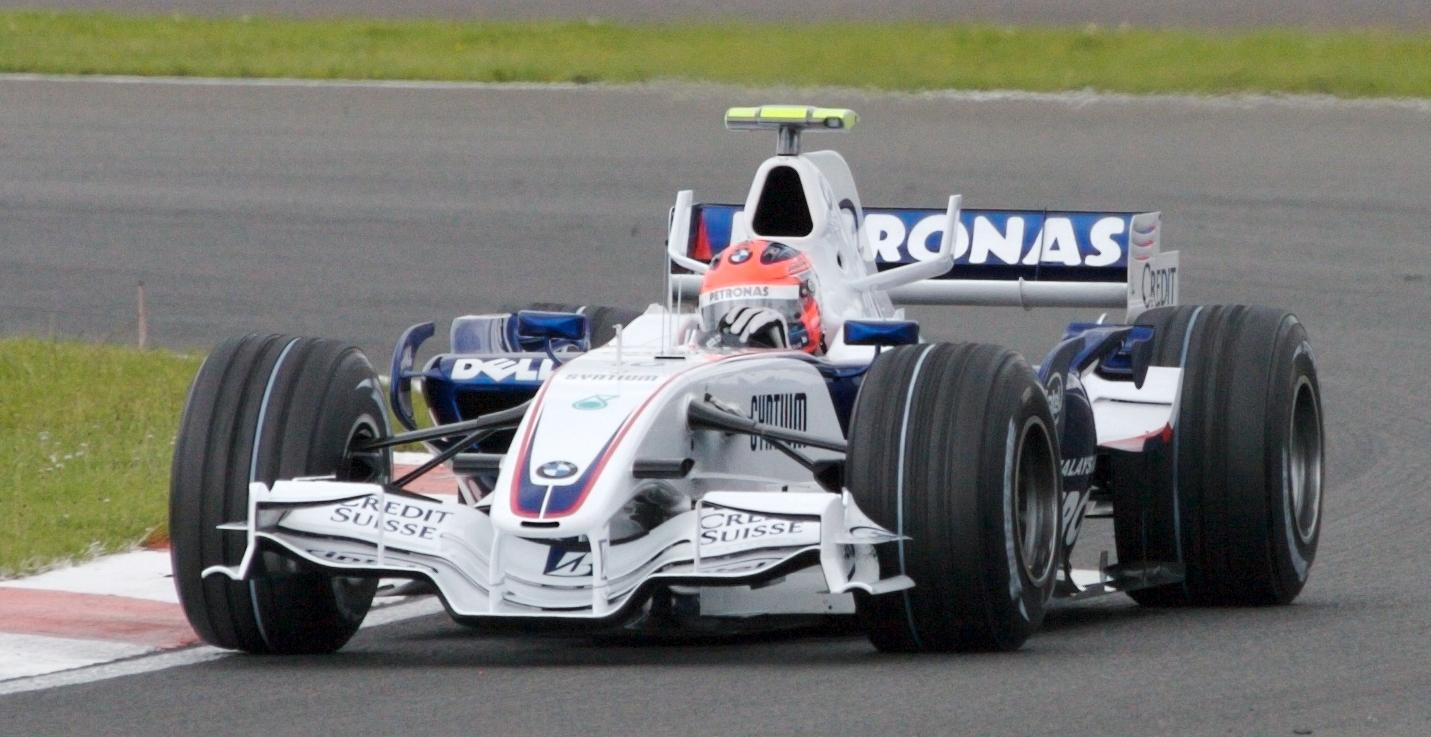
Kubica driving for BMW Sauber at the 2007 British Grand Prix

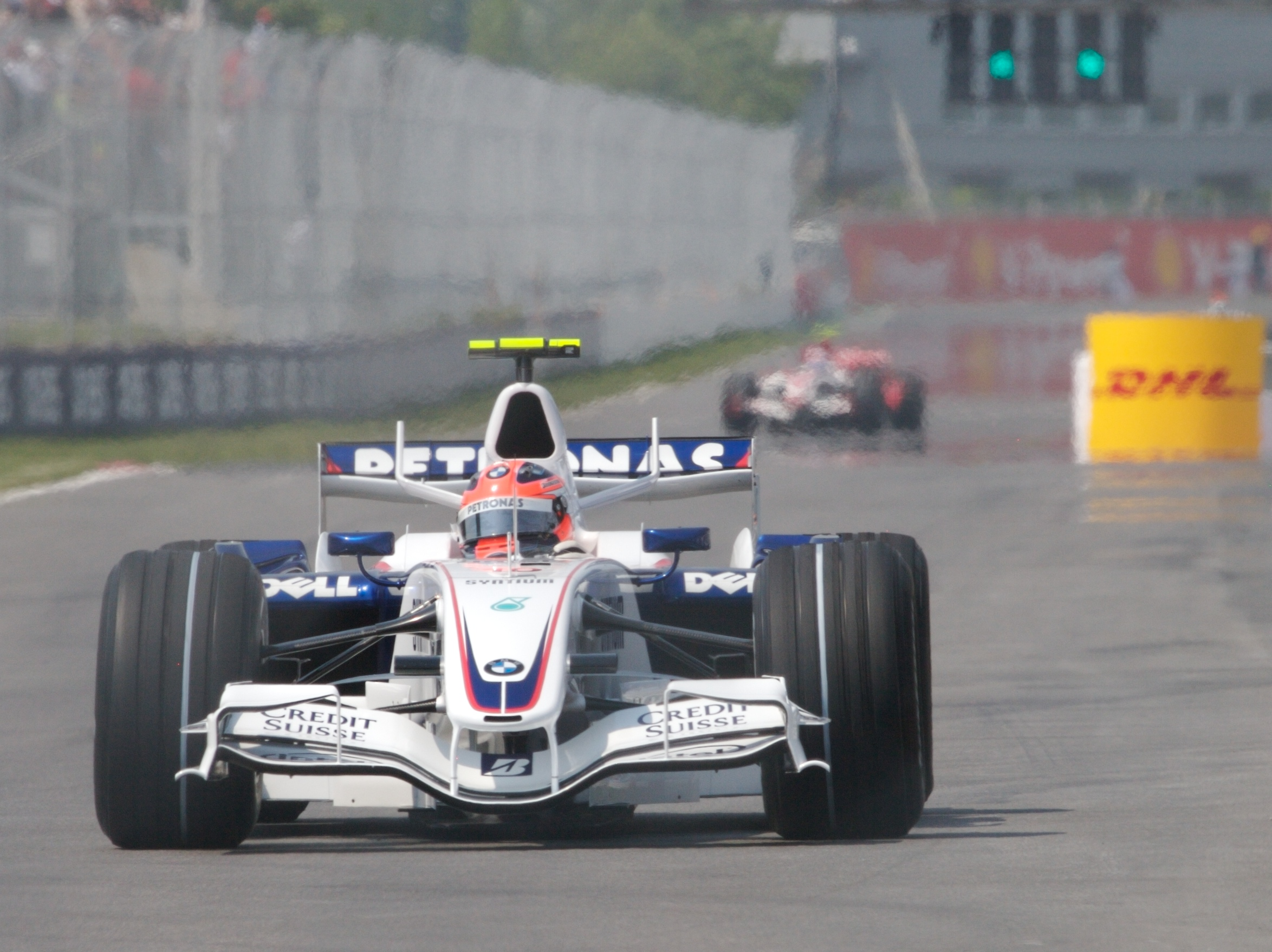
Kubica at the 2007 Canadian Grand Prix

Kubica performed well during the 2007 season, finishing consistently in point scoring positions. At the Canadian Grand Prix Kubica had a serious crash approaching the hairpin on lap 27, in which his car made contact with Jarno Trulli's Toyota, and hit a hump in the grass which lifted the car's nose into the air and left him unable to brake or steer. The car then hit the concrete retaining wall and rolled as it came back across the track, striking the opposite wall on the outside of the hairpin and coming to rest on its side. The car was heavily damaged and Kubica's feet could be seen exposed through the destroyed nose of the car. The speed measured when his car clipped the barrier was 300.13 km/h (186.49 mph), at a 75-degree angle, subjecting Kubica to an average deceleration of 28 g. After data from the onboard accident data recorder had been analysed it was found that he had been subjected to a peak G-force of 75 G. Under safety car conditions, Kubica was removed from the car and taken to the circuit's medical centre, where he was announced to be in "stable" condition. Shortly afterwards, his manager Daniele Morelli said Kubica was conscious and talking. It was initially reported that Kubica could have a broken leg. However, Mario Theissen later confirmed that he was not seriously injured.

Further reports from late evening on race day, directly from the hospital, confirmed that Kubica had suffered a light concussion alongside a sprained ankle. After being kept in overnight for observation, Kubica left hospital the following day. On 14 June, it was announced that as a precaution, Kubica would not race at the United States Grand Prix and would be replaced by test driver Sebastian Vettel. After missing Indianapolis, he returned for the French Grand Prix where he qualified and finished in fourth place, receiving ITV broadcaster Martin Brundle's driver of the day award. He then went on to finish fourth again at the British Grand Prix.

==== 2008: Maiden win ====
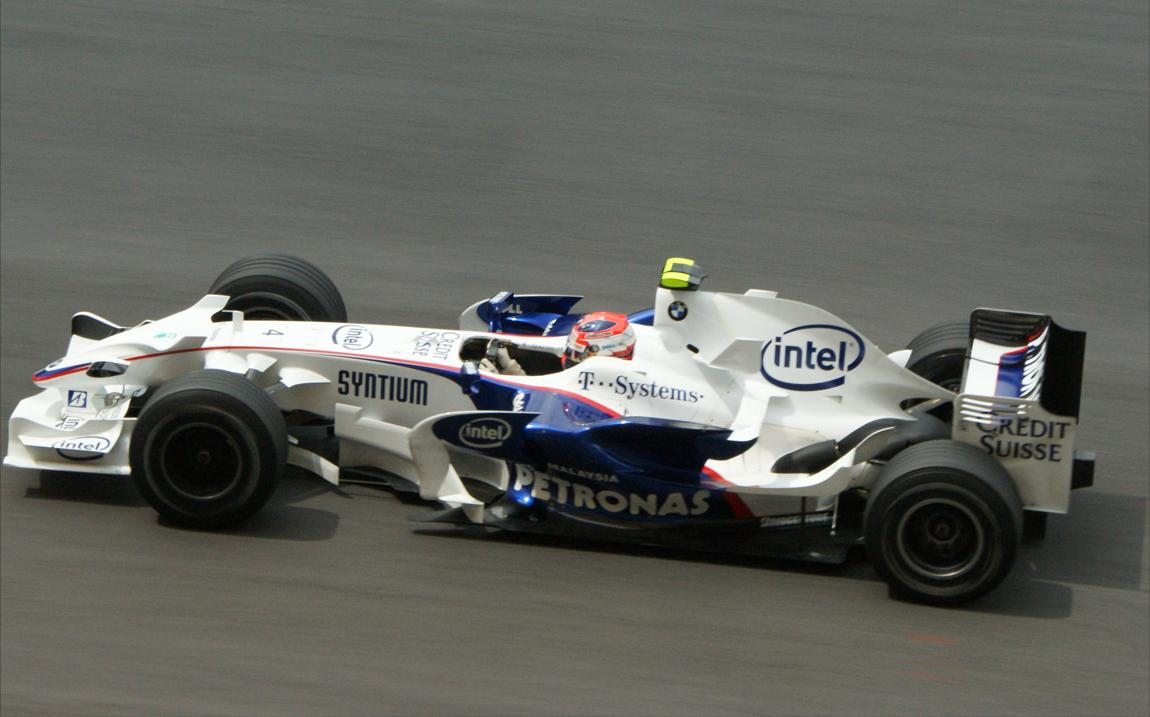
Kubica driving for BMW Sauber at the 2008 Malaysian Grand Prix

Kubica's retention as race driver for 2008 was confirmed on 21 August 2007. Over the first half of the season, he qualified and finished strongly, including his and BMW Sauber's first pole position at the Bahrain Grand Prix and second-place finishes at the Malaysian and Monaco Grands Prix.

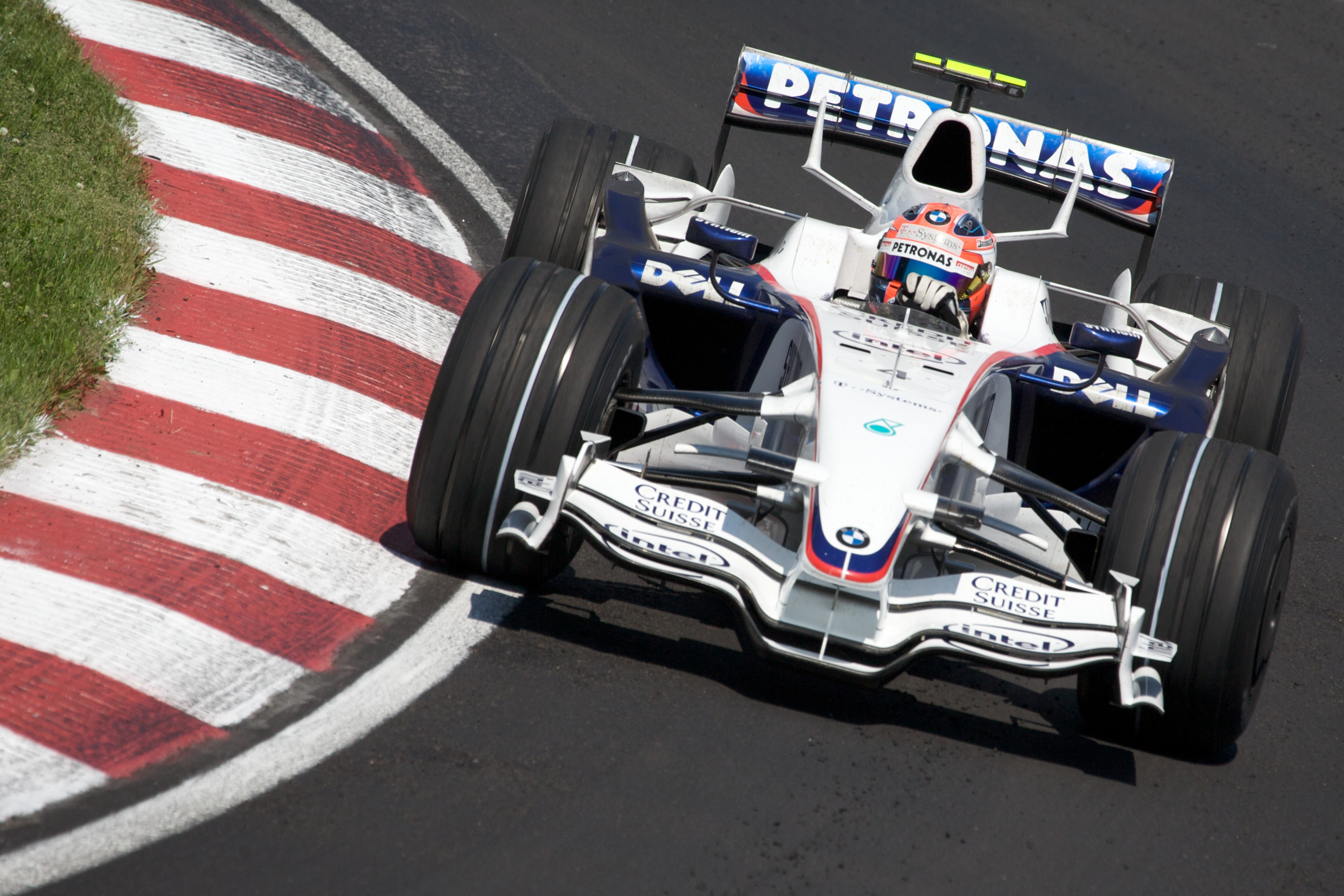
Kubica achieved the first win of his F1 career at the 2008 Canadian Grand Prix.

On 8 June 2008 at the Canadian Grand Prix, Kubica achieved his first Formula 1 victory. He started second on the grid and passed race leader Lewis Hamilton in the first round of pitstops after the BMW Sauber pit crew completed a faster pitstop. On leaving the pits, Kubica and Kimi Räikkönen's Ferrari halted at the pit lane exit, waiting for the red pit exit light to change. Hamilton, running immediately behind them, missed the light and crashed into Räikkönen's Ferrari, eliminating both cars from the race. Kubica rejoined the race well positioned for the eventual victory. He passed Heidfeld's sister BMW Sauber, running one refuelling stop to Kubica's two stop strategy, and gained the necessary 24 seconds over Heidfeld to ensure that he maintained the lead after his second stop 22 laps later. The BMW Saubers remained first and second to the end of the race. The win gave Kubica the lead in the Drivers' Championship.

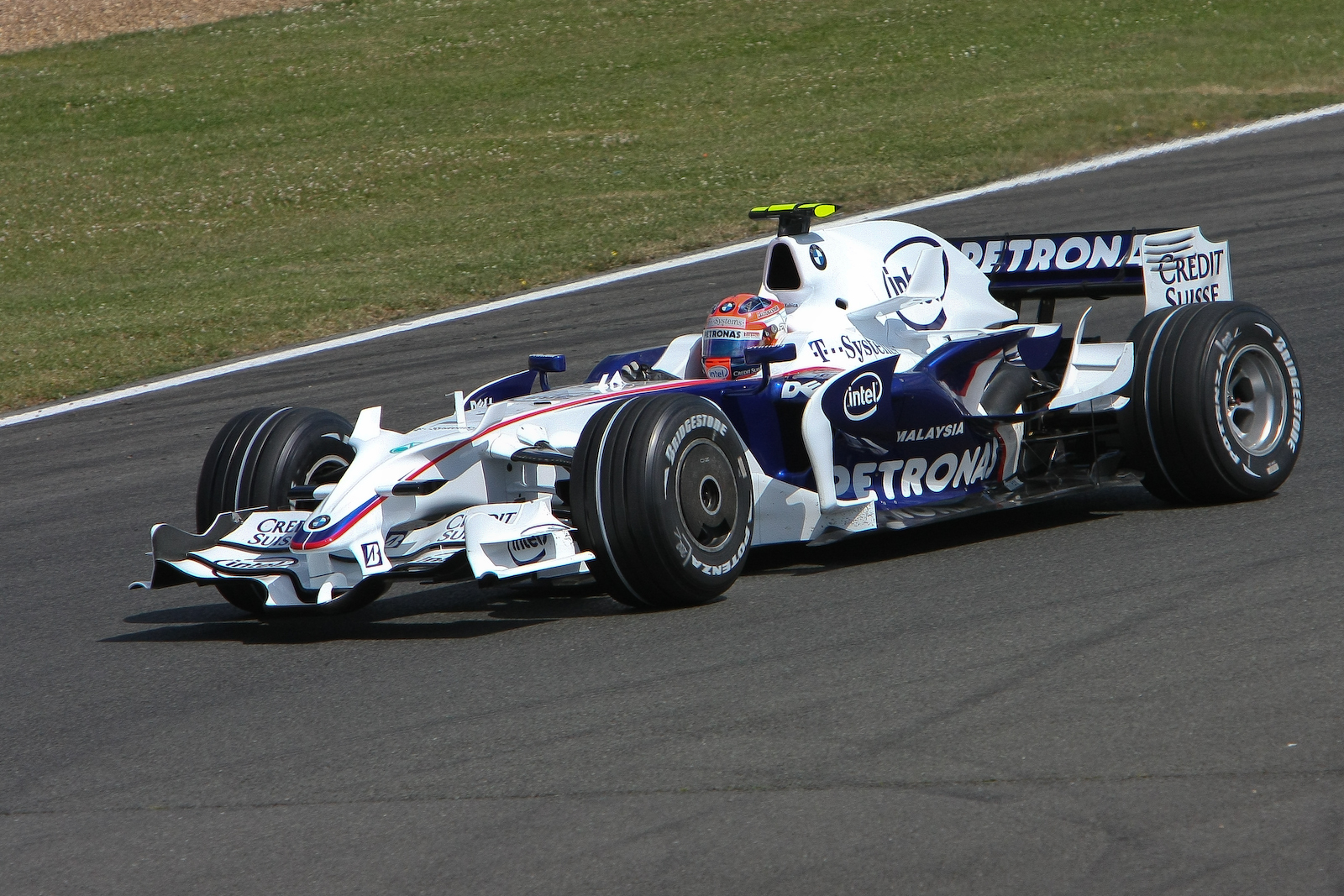
Kubica driving for BMW Sauber at the 2008 British Grand Prix

BMW Sauber's results were weaker over the second half of the season. At the French Grand Prix at Magny-Cours, Kubica finished 5th, reporting that this was a lost race, complaining about aerodynamic problems with the car. Kubica's strongest result of the latter part of the year was in Japan where he qualified sixth. At the start, several drivers braked too late for the first corner. Kubica took an inside line overtaking several cars and emerged in the lead. He led for 16 laps, but lost his lead to Fernando Alonso at the first round of pit stops. Kubica finished second after defending his position towards the end of the race against Räikkönen in a faster Ferrari (his fastest race lap was 0.6 seconds quicker than the Pole's) Apart from that, Kubica achieved podiums in a race in Valencia and in the rain affected race at Monza. Kubica finished the year fourth in the Drivers' Championship, tied on points with Räikkönen.

==== 2009: Departure from BMW Sauber ====
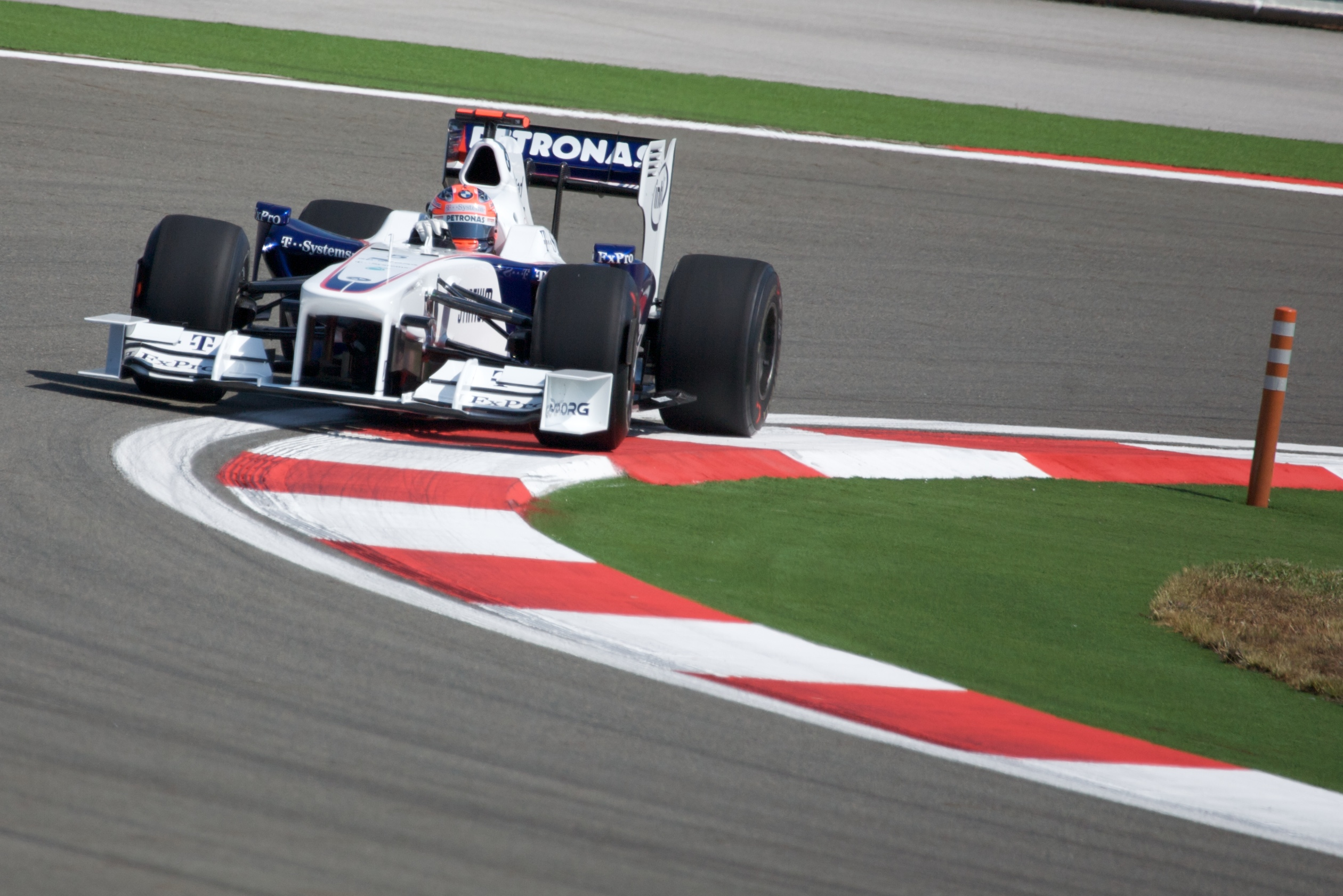
Kubica driving for BMW Sauber at the 2009 Turkish Grand Prix

At the 2009 season opener in Melbourne, Kubica qualified fourth on the grid. During the race, he was in third place and closing the gap to the front two cars before making contact with Sebastian Vettel while trying to overtake him. After the incident, Kubica continued briefly, but crashed into a wall at the next corner because his front wing had become stuck under the car. Vettel was later deemed responsible for the accident, and given a 10-place penalty on the grid for the next race in Malaysia. BMW motorsport director Mario Theissen stated that Kubica would have won the race ahead of Jenson Button had it not been for Vettel.

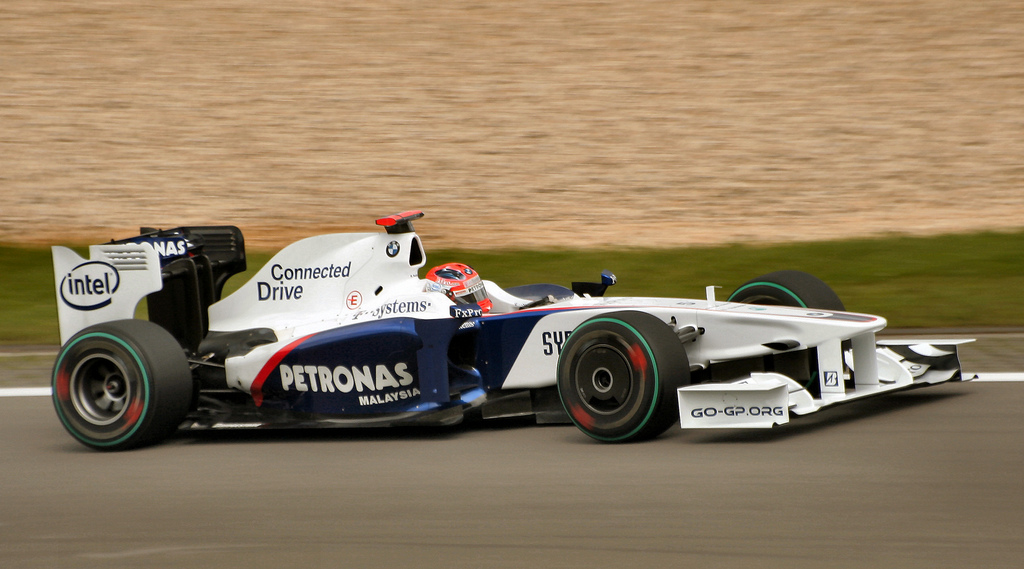
Kubica at the 2009 German Grand Prix

At the Malaysian Grand Prix, Kubica qualified in eighth place, but was promoted to sixth following Vettel's ten-place grid penalty for causing the crash in Australia, and Rubens Barrichello's five-place grid drop for changing his gearbox. However, he retired very early in the race with engine problems. The next two races, the Chinese Grand Prix and the Bahrain Grand Prix were disappointing for the BMW Sauber team as both Kubica and his teammate Heidfeld finished outside the points with a non-competitive car.

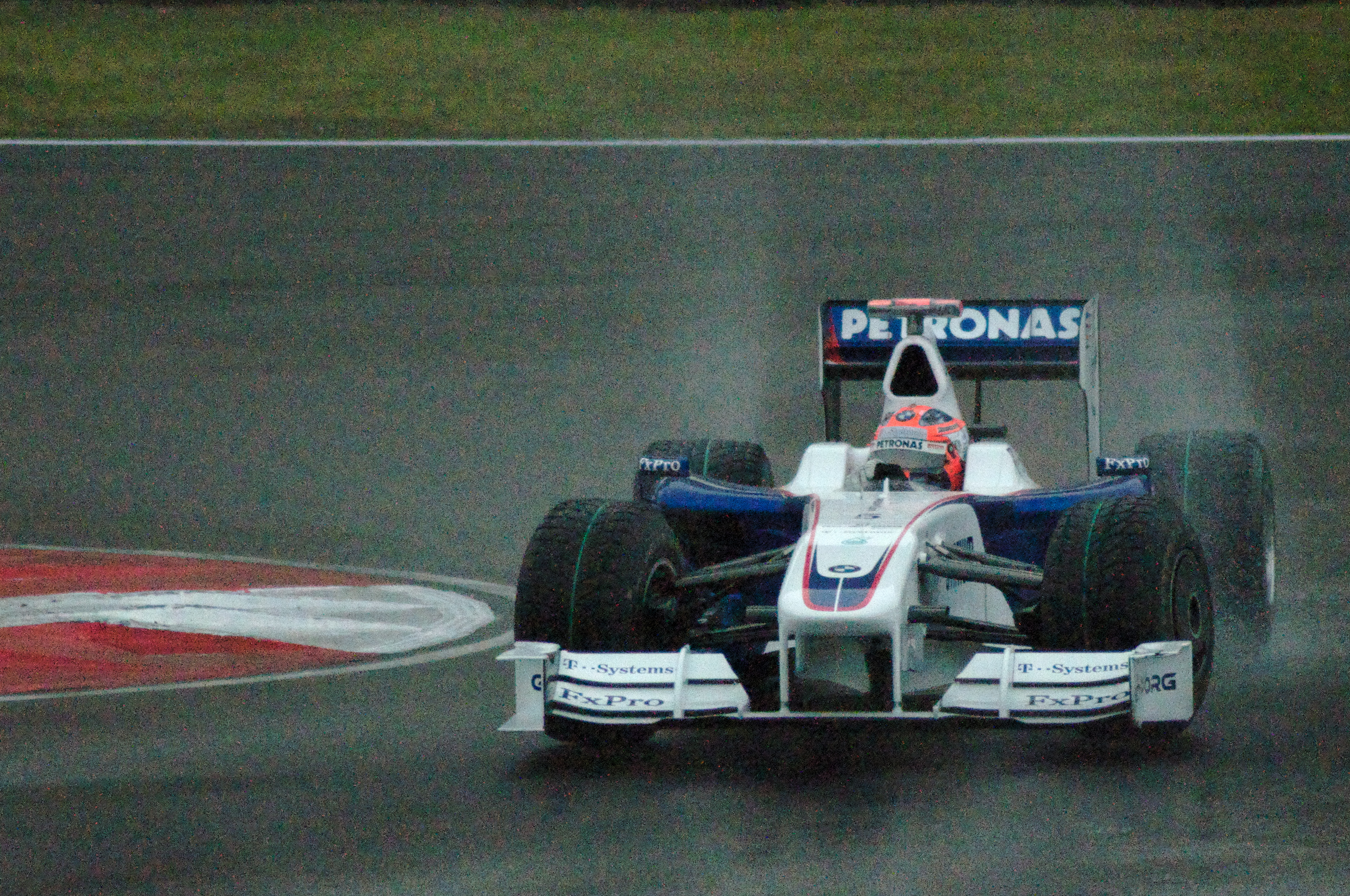
Kubica at the 2009 Chinese Grand Prix

For the next race in Barcelona, BMW Sauber prepared a modified version of the F1.09. The car proved more competitive but a mistake in fitting the tyres to Kubica's car during Q3 meant he could only qualify in ten position. In the race, after a bad start (due to a clutch issue) he finished once more out of the points. Kubica had an engine failure during second practice in Monaco, and retired from the Grand Prix due to a brake issue. At the Turkish Grand Prix, the team introduced the double diffuser. The car's performance improved and Kubica managed to score his first points of the season with a seventh place. In the next three races, both BMW Sauber drivers finished outside the points again, but during the European and Belgian Grands Prix again proved to be competitive, scoring eighth and fourth positions respectively. In Italy, Kubica had engine trouble in qualifying and then retired from the race due to an oil leak. At the Singapore Grand Prix, Kubica finished eighth, defending his position from Kazuki Nakajima and Räikkönen in the last laps. He later stated it was "the most difficult point I have ever scored". At the Brazilian Grand Prix, Kubica scored his first podium of the season despite engine temperature problems by finishing in second place, 7.6 seconds behind winner Mark Webber. The podium was BMW's second of the season.

On 29 July 2009, BMW announced that they would leave Formula One at the end of 2009, which made Kubica a free agent for the 2010 season. For the 2010 season, it was announced that he had signed for Renault F1, the team he tested for during his junior career.

=== Renault (2010–2011) ===
==== 2010: First season at Renault ====
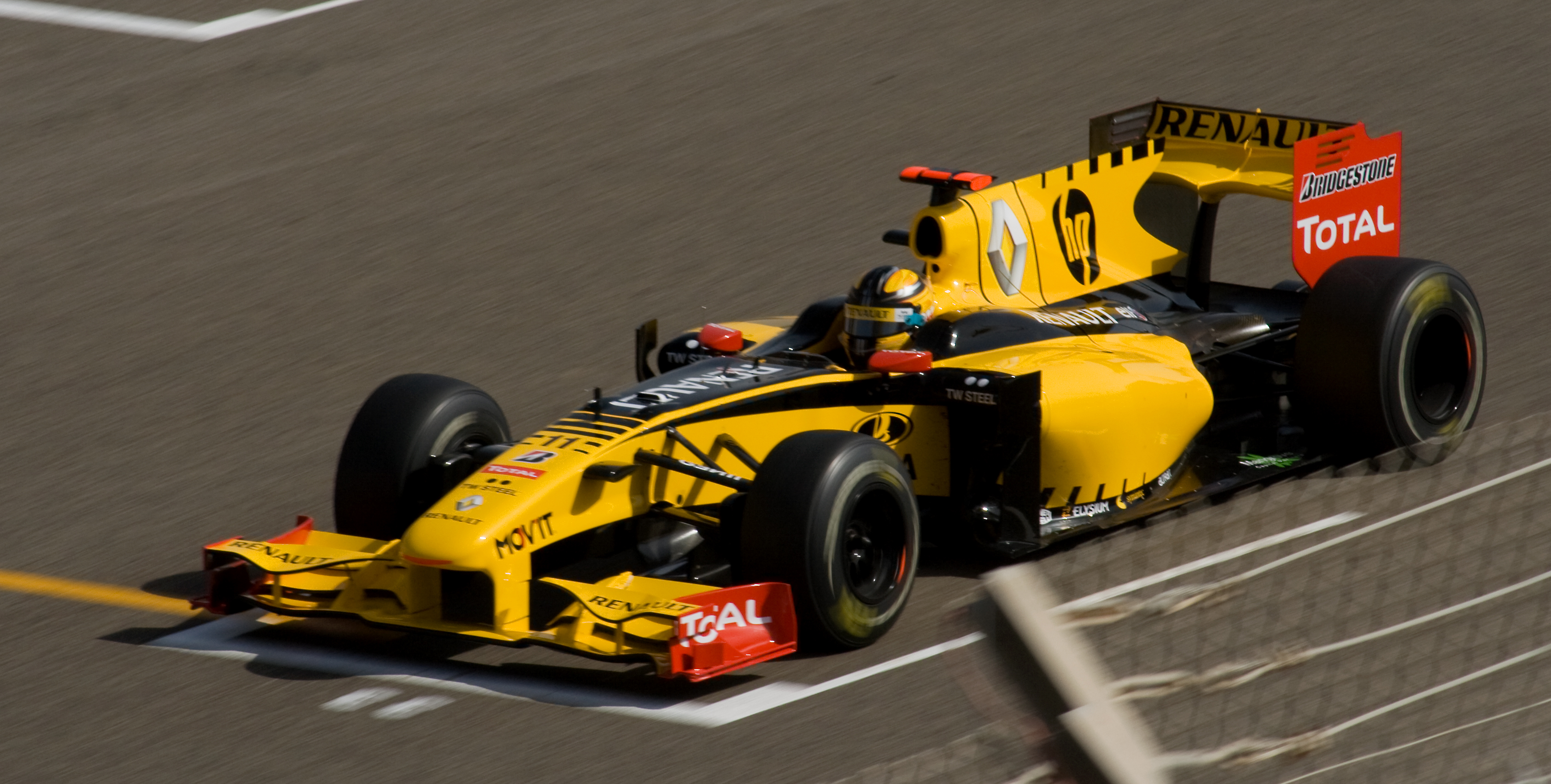
Kubica driving for Renault at the 2010 Bahrain Grand Prix, the opening round of the season.

Kubica moved to the Renault team for 2010. His position was briefly put in doubt, however, by the team evaluating its future in the sport following the 2009 season in the wake of the "Crashgate" scandal and the parent company's financial problems. This resulted in a Luxembourg-based investment firm, Genii Capital, taking a 75% stake in the team; Renault retained the remaining 25%. Eric Boullier was also appointed as the new team manager. Kubica said he might not stay with Renault, as his contract was only valid if the parent company had a controlling stake in the team, but he then decided to remain with them. On 31 January 2010, it was announced that Vitaly Petrov was to be Kubica's teammate.

It was reported in Autosport that Ferrari driver Felipe Massa had until the 2010 British Grand Prix to prove to the Maranello outfit that he was worth hanging onto: if not, Kubica would take his seat in 2011. However, Ferrari re-signed Massa for 2011, leaving Kubica without a drive at the Italian team.

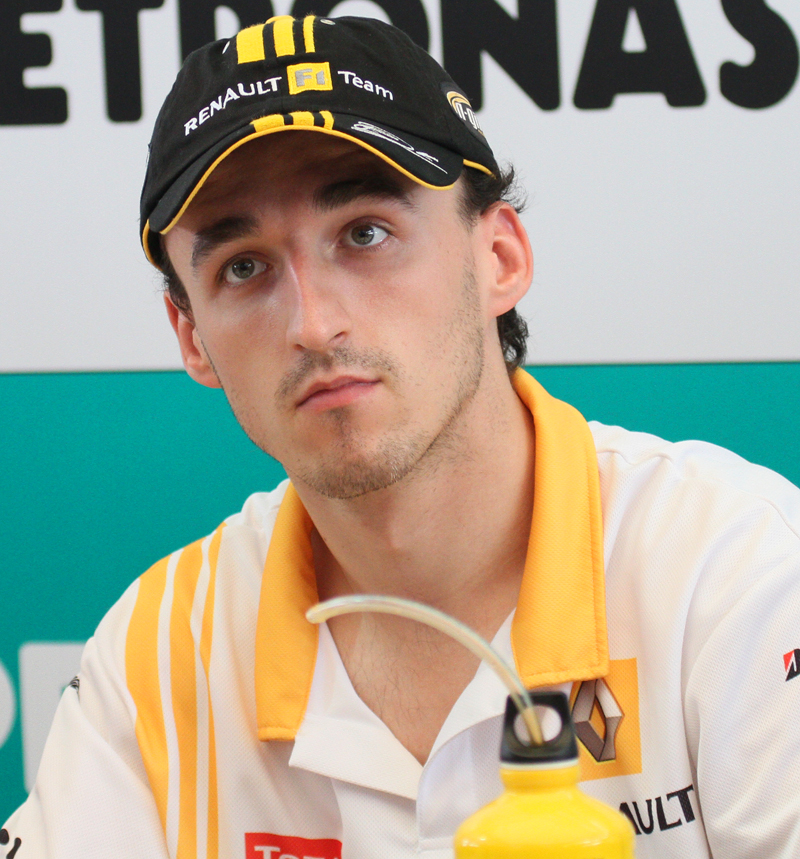
Kubica at the 2010 Malaysian Grand Prix as a Renault F1 Team driver.

On 7 July 2010, it was confirmed that Kubica had extended his contract with Renault to 2012.

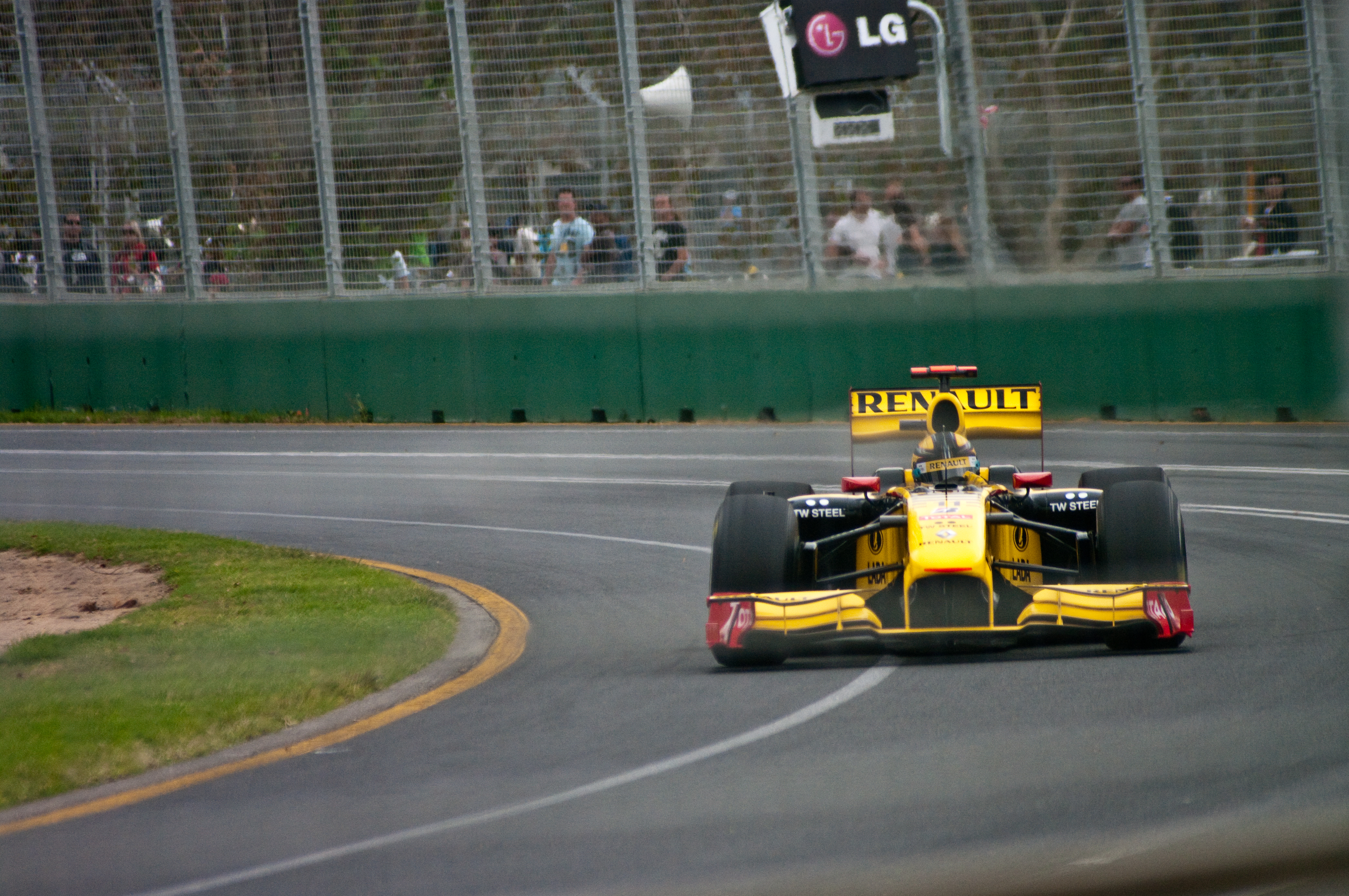
Kubica scored both his and the team's best result of the year with second place at the Australian Grand Prix.

At the opening race of the 2010 season in Bahrain, Kubica was tagged by Adrian Sutil and spun on the opening lap but recovered to 11th. At the next race in Australia, he finished second after starting in ninth position. Fourth in Malaysia and fifth in China left him in seventh place in the Drivers' Championship, 20 points behind championship leader Jenson Button. Kubica felt that had there not been a second safety car period in China he could have finished on the podium. In Spain he finished eighth, but followed this up with another podium in Monaco, holding third throughout after losing second at the start to Sebastian Vettel. At the Turkish Grand Prix, he was held up behind Nico Rosberg for the second time in the season after Malaysia, and finished sixth.

In Canada, Kubica finished seventh after an eventful race and problems with tyre degradation which made his race difficult, but did set the first fastest lap of his career in the race's closing stages. He added a fifth in Valencia and seventh in Germany before taking his third podium of the season in Belgium. He was competitive throughout the weekend, qualifying third, and only a bungled pitstop cost him second to Mark Webber. In Singapore, he qualified eighth in front of Schumacher. During the late stages of the race, he was forced to pit from sixth place due to a puncture. He was released from the pits to twelfth place, but with the help from superior grip and a series of overtaking moves—his move against Sutil was favourably compared to the incident between Webber and Hamilton—was able to claim seventh place, ultimately gaining a place from his qualifying result. In Suzuka, he managed to trail the Red Bulls throughout the weekend and translated it into a strong third place in qualifying. However, despite getting a good start and overtaking Webber at the start of the race, but would retire during the safety car period after losing one of his rear tyres.

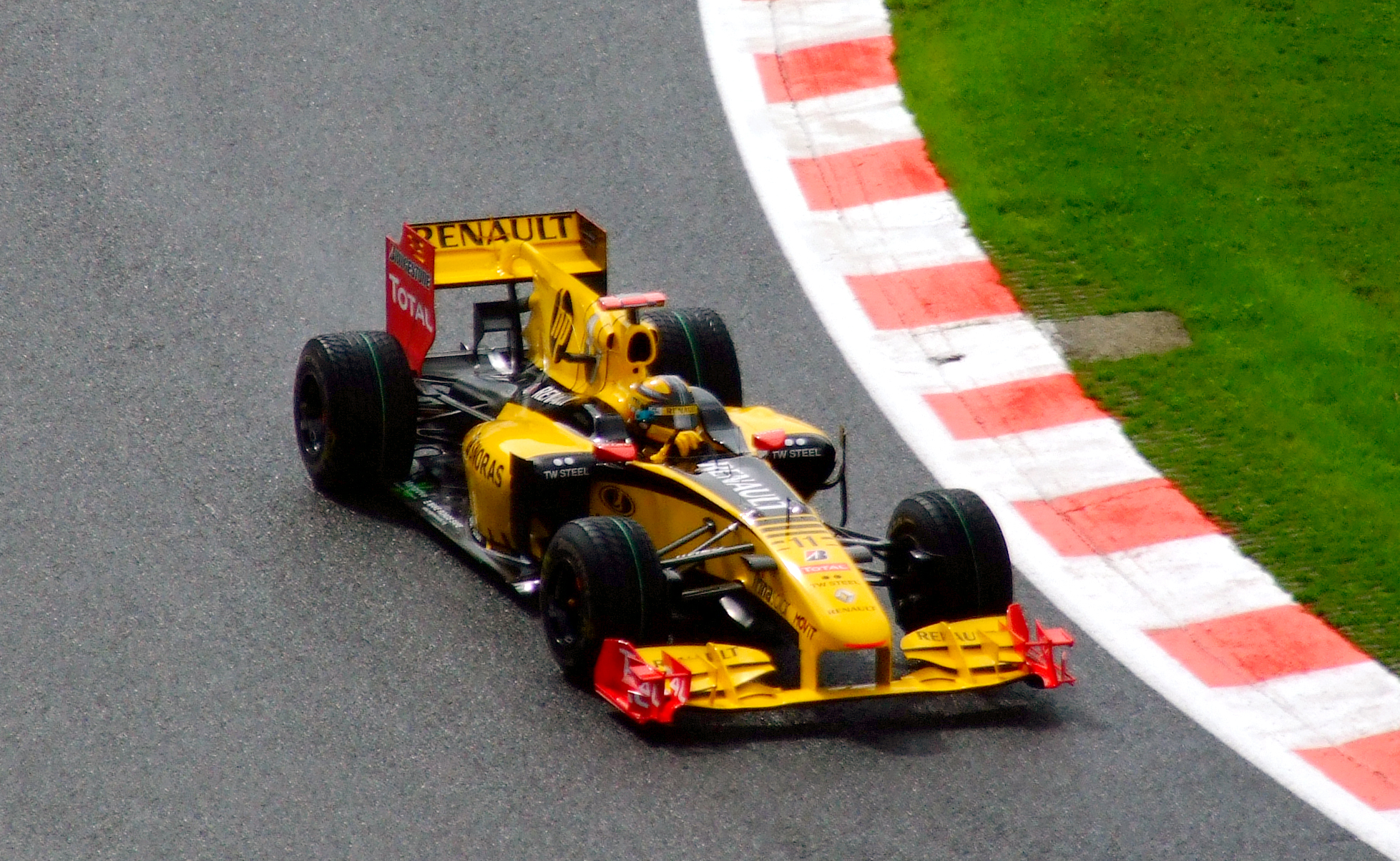
Kubica at the 2010 Belgian Grand Prix

Formula One journalist Mark Hughes remarked that Kubica was currently "arguably the best driver", considering the season so far. He emphasised Kubica's strong showing in tracks where Hughes believed that the differences in driver skills are able to overwhelm the differences in the capability of the cars; namely, Monaco, Spa and Suzuka. Kubica managed to finish on the podium behind the Red Bulls except in Suzuka where he was strong throughout the weekend nevertheless, despite retiring from the race through no fault of his own.

==== 2011: Near-fatal rally accident ends season ====
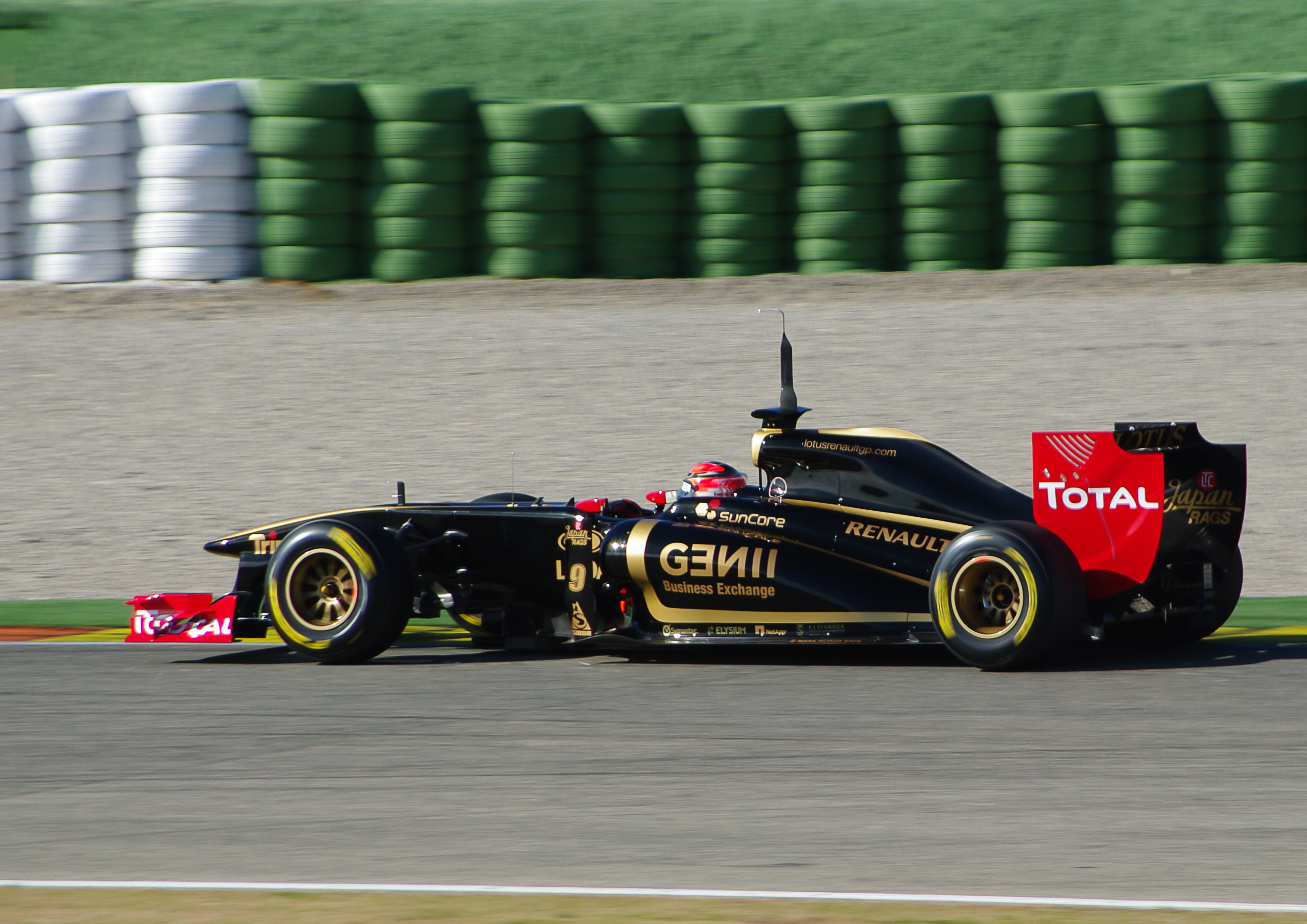
Kubica testing the R31 on Wednesday 2 February – days before his near-fatal rally crash

Kubica was retained by Renault – rebranded as Lotus Renault GP through Lotus Cars sponsorship – into the 2011 season, again partnered with Petrov. He tested the team's new car, the Renault R31, for the first time in Valencia on 2 February. On the last day of testing in Valencia he set the fastest time of the session. Three days later, he was seriously injured in a rallying accident in Andora.

As Kubica was unable to start the season following his accident, Lotus Renault signed his former BMW Sauber teammate Nick Heidfeld as his replacement on 16 February, while Kubica still remained signed with the team for the 2011 season. Bruno Senna replaced Heidfeld later in the season, at the Belgian Grand Prix. Kubica was released from hospital to begin his rehabilitation on 24 April 2011. In November 2011, it was announced that Kubica would not be ready for the beginning of the 2012 season, forcing Renault (who at this point had changed their name to Lotus) to begin the season with two other drivers, Kimi Räikkönen and Romain Grosjean. In an interview in 2018 Kubica revealed that he had signed for Ferrari for the 2012 season.

== 2011 rallying accident ==
On 6 February 2011, Kubica was injured in a crash on the first stage of the Ronde di Andora rally. He was driving a Super 2000-specification Škoda Fabia in Testico when his car left the road at high speed and hit a crash barrier, near the church of San Sebastiano. Kubica was trapped in the car for more than an hour before rescue workers were able to extricate him. He was flown by helicopter to Santa Corona Hospital in Pietra Ligure near Savona, where it was confirmed that he had a partial amputation of his forearm, compound fractures to his right elbow, shoulder and leg, as well as significant loss of blood. The severity of his injuries was the result of the crash barrier penetrating the car's cockpit, and hitting Kubica, while leaving his co-driver unscathed. Kubica underwent a seven-hour operation by seven doctors split into two teams, without complications. Two more lengthy operations to repair fractures to his leg, shoulder and arm were performed successfully a few days later. The condition of his hand was not clear for some time and as a result he missed the 2011 season.

== Recovery and return to motorsport ==
=== Rallying ===
Kubica's recovery was dealt another setback after he re-broke his right leg, when he reportedly slipped on ice near his home in Italy, on 11 January 2012. He remained out of competitive racing for most of 2012, but returned to compete in the Ronde Gomitolo Di Lana in a WRC car on 9 September. He won the rally, finishing one minute ahead of the second placed driver.

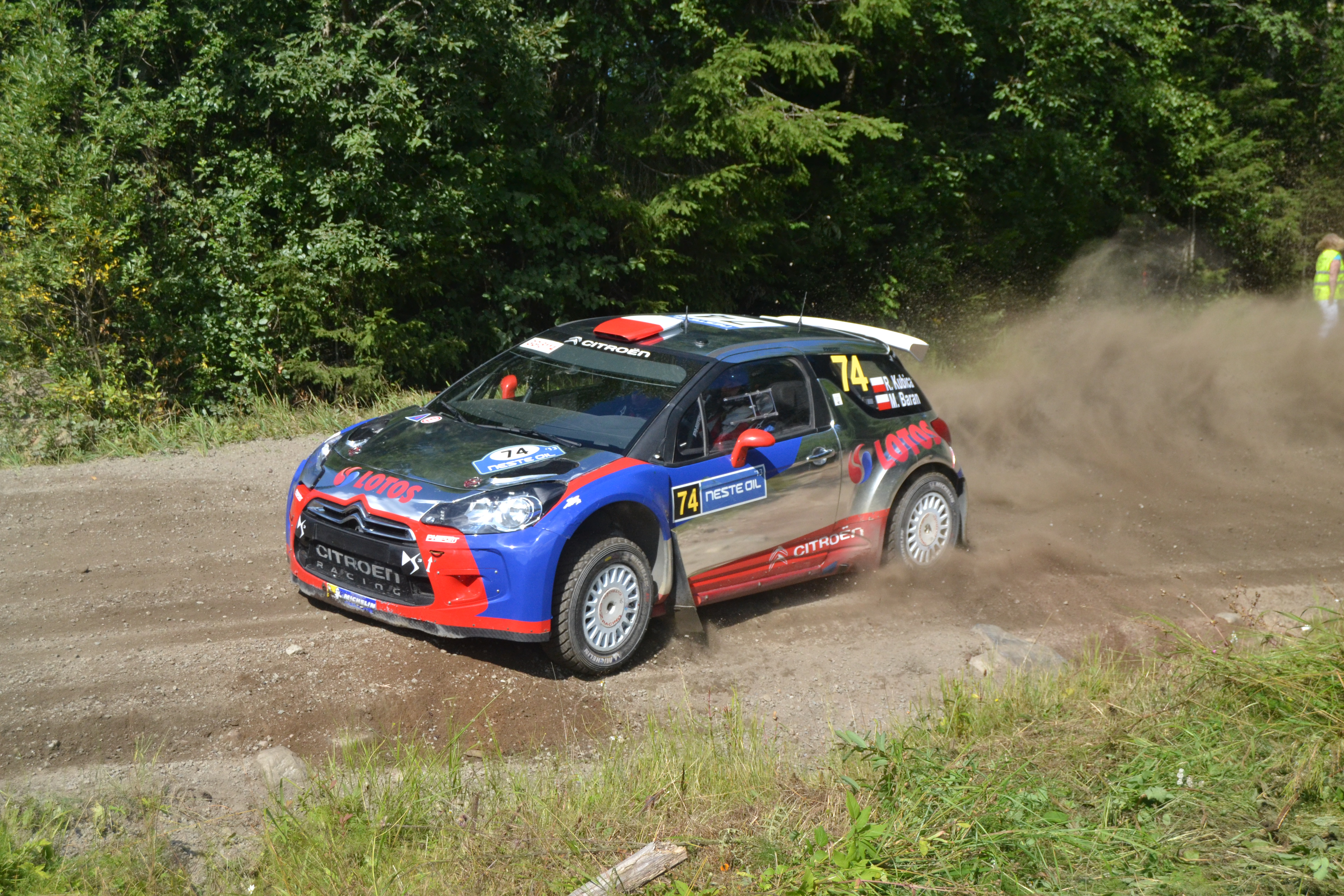
Kubica at the 2013 Rally Finland

==== 2013–2016: World Rally Championship ====
In 2013, Kubica continued his return, focusing on rallying. He drove for Citroën in the European and WRC2 Championships. His first event was the Rally de Portugal, in which he was competitive, but crashed and issues with his car led to him finishing in sixth. Then, at the Acropolis Rally, Kubica won, finishing nearly 90 seconds ahead of second placed Yuriy Protasov. He repeated this success at the Rally d'Italia winning ahead of Abdulaziz Al-Kuwari by four minutes. At the 2013 Rally Finland, Kubica lost to Jari Ketomaa by nearly 90 seconds. The Rallye Deutschland was a big success. Not only did the Pole win ahead of Elfyn Evans by 12.9 seconds, he became the leader of the WRC2 Championship. He re-gained this position (Al-Kuwari became the leader in Australia) at the Rallye de France, again beating Evans, this time by four minutes. He won again at the Rally RACC Catalunya, his fifth victory of the season. With this result he was able to clinch the championship, as his nearest rival Al-Kuwari was too far behind to regain the first position in the championship. Kubica conducted a number of simulator tests with the Mercedes Formula 1 team which showed promise, but limitations in the range of motion of his injured arm would prevent him from driving in twisty circuits like Monaco due to the tight confines of an F1 cockpit.

In 2014, Kubica started in the first round of the ERC season. He won the Internationale Jänner Rallye to claim his first victory in that championship, after coming very close on a number of occasions in 2014. His strong results in the stages for this rally eventually netted him the "Ice Master" trophy for the best driver in snow events that season. For the rest of the season, he participated in the main WRC class for the RK M-Sport, running as separate team, backed by Polish oil company Lotos. Kubica began his WRC campaign by taking the lead of the Monte Carlo Rally through the first two stages, but later retired on the second day after crashing out on SS9. Kubica suffered from a string of bad luck for the rest of the season, being fast on occasion but rarely managing to convert his speed into results. His best result was a sixth place at the Rally Argentina, a place lower than his highest finish in 2013 (fifth in Germany) in a WRC-2 car. He finished the season in 16th place with 14 points. He finished the year on a positive note by winning the non-championship Monza Rally Show, beating motorcycle legend Valentino Rossi to second.

After speculation following the 2014 WRC season, Kubica announced he would be racing in 2015, still running Ford Fiesta RS WRC and backed by Lotos, albeit no longer prepared by M-Sport. In 2016, due to a lack of funding, his sole WRC rally was the Monte Carlo.

=== Sportscar racing ===
==== 2016–2017: GT3 ====
In March 2016, Kubica took part in the Mugello 12 Hours, a round of Creventic's International Endurance Series, in a GT3 Mercedes. In September 2016, he competed in the Renault Sport Trophy at the penultimate round of the season in Spa, Belgium.

In January 2017, Kubica took part in the first round of the 24H Series, the Dubai 24 Hour, driving a Förch Racing Porsche 911 GT3 in the A6-Pro class with co-drivers Robert Lukas, Marcin Jedliński, Wolf Henzler and Santiago Creel. This ended in retirement with undisclosed mechanical problems.

==== 2017: LMP1 debut ====
On 2 February 2017, Kubica was signed by the ByKolles privateer LMP1 team in the FIA World Endurance Championship. This came after he tested their car in November 2016 during the WEC rookie test at Bahrain, and lapped faster than the team's regulars managed on the race weekend. Oliver Webb will remain with the team, with a third driver for the Nissan-powered CLM P1/01 yet to be named. After the pre-season testing at Italy's Autodromo Nazionale Monza, where Kubica did not do any running, the driver announced via social media that he would not be participating in the forthcoming season.

=== Formula E ===
On 2 May 2017, Kubica partook in an independently organised test of a Formula E car at Donington Park, with an aim of partaking in the New York ePrix. This failed to happen.

== Return to Formula One ==
=== 2017: Uncontracted testing ===
On 5 June 2017, it was announced that Kubica would be driving in a Renault-organized test of their 2012 car, the Lotus E20, at Circuit Ricardo Tormo, his first Formula One event since his accident in 2011.

Renault organised a further test, with Renault managing director Cyril Abiteboul stating that "he was still quick, still consistent and more importantly he still has the enthusiasm he always carried to the team". He added that there were "no obvious roadblocks" to a Formula One return, and told NBC Sports that Kubica could be an option for 2018.

On 24 July 2017, it was announced that Kubica would participate in the test for Renault, which would be held after the conclusion of the Hungarian Grand Prix. Abiteboul, Renault's team managing director, said the test will allow the team to fully assess Kubica's current capabilities, and how likely he might be to "return to competition in the upcoming years". Kubica completed 142 laps of the Hungaroring on his return, finishing fourth-fastest nearly 1.5 seconds behind Sebastian Vettel.

On 11 October 2017, Kubica completed a one-day test with Williams at Silverstone driving the 2014 FW36. On 17 October 2017, Kubica had a second day of testing with Williams at the Hungaroring.

After Felipe Massa announced his retirement from the sport for the second time, Kubica became one of the top contenders to take his seat at Williams Martini Racing. He then tested for them at the Yas Marina Circuit following the 2017 Abu Dhabi Grand Prix, completing 100 laps in his first test with the team's 2017 FW40. He completed an additional 28 laps the next day and finished seventh fastest, with Williams technical chief Paddy Lowe reporting that "there are no issues around" his injuries.

=== Williams (2018–2019) ===
==== 2018: Reserve driver for Williams ====
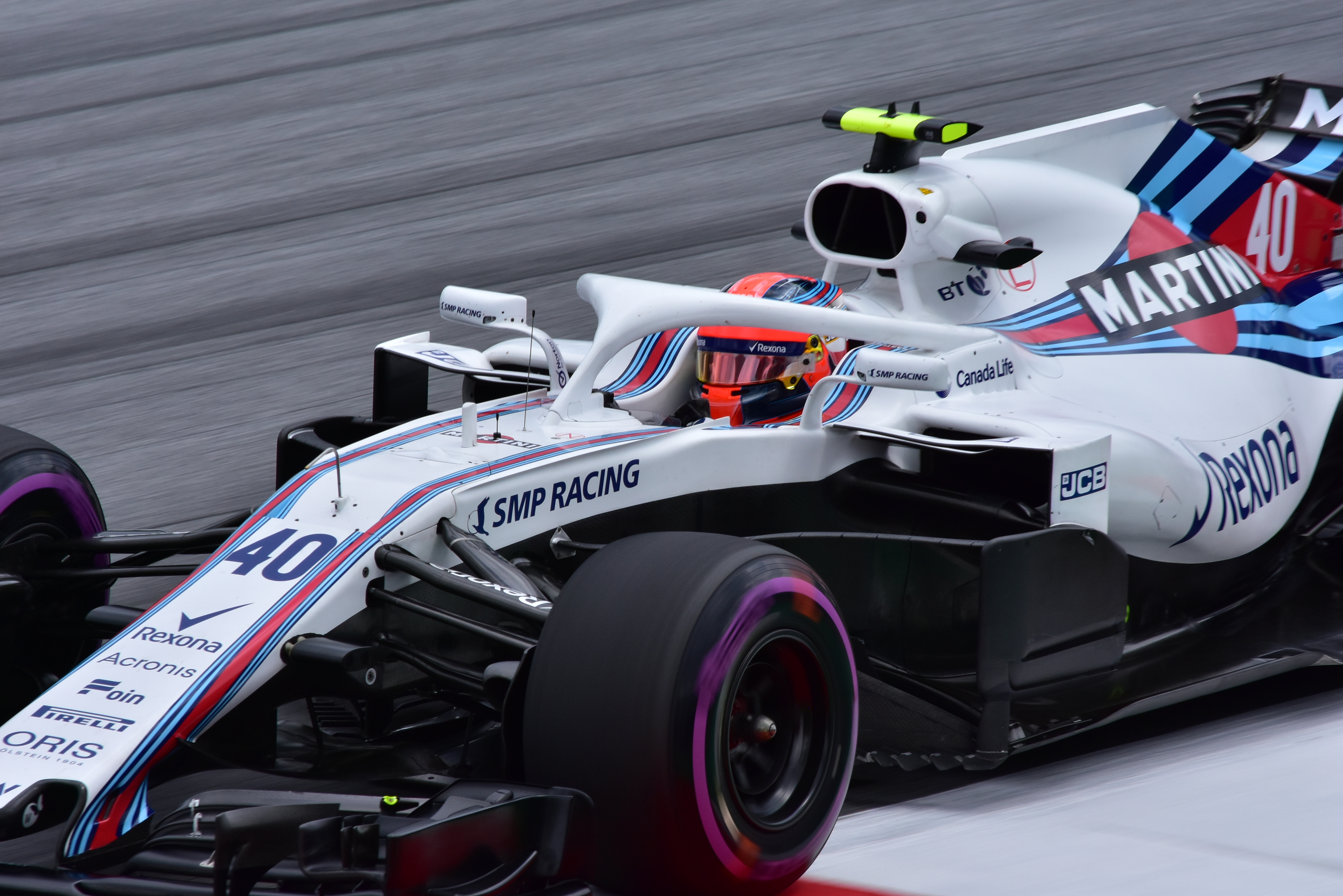
Kubica driving for Williams at the 2018 Austrian Grand Prix

On 16 January 2018, it was announced that Kubica would become the reserve driver of Williams for the 2018 season. He took part in his first Grand Prix weekend since the final round of the 2010 campaign, in Friday's first practice session at the 2018 Spanish Grand Prix, outperforming teammate Lance Stroll.

==== 2019: Return to full-time racing seat ====
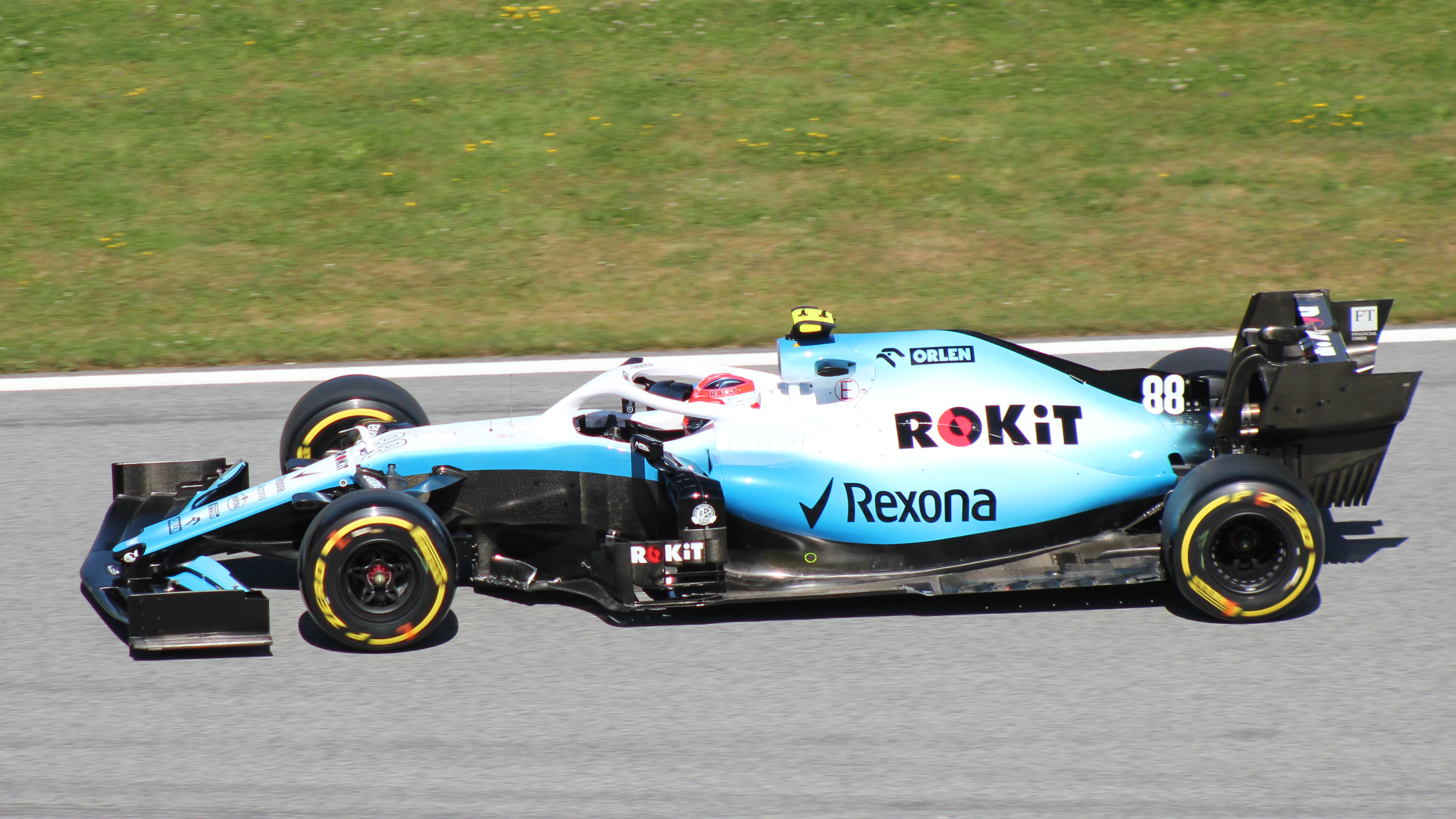
Kubica at the 2019 Austrian Grand Prix

Before the final round of the 2018 season, Williams announced that Kubica would race full-time for the team in 2019, partnering 2018 Formula 2 champion George Russell. Kubica chose 88 as his driver number, previously used by Rio Haryanto in 2016. The team struggled during the season, with the FW42 being the slowest car of the field. Kubica finished in 12th place at the German Grand Prix, but was promoted to tenth following penalties for Kimi Räikkönen and Antonio Giovinazzi, scoring his first point since his return to F1 and breaking the record of the longest time between successive points finishes.

On 19 September 2019, before the Singapore Grand Prix, Kubica announced his decision to end his stint at Williams after the end of the season. Williams released a statement shortly after, stating that Kubica would see out the remainder of the season but would vacate his driver position for the 2020 season.

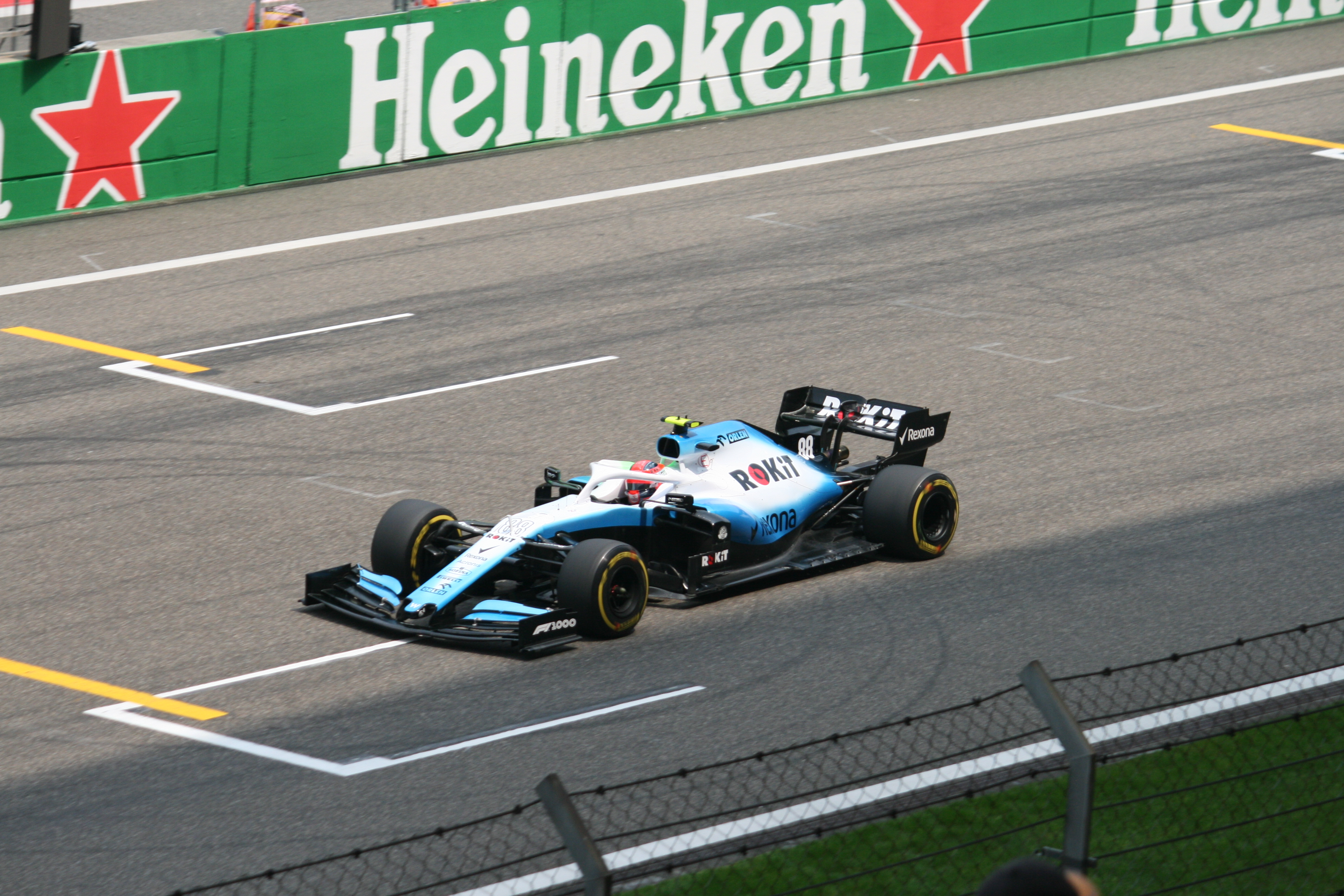
Kubica at the 2019 Chinese Grand Prix

Kubica's first retirement since his return to the sport came in Russia, when Williams decided to retire his car to conserve parts after teammate Russell's race ended due to a wheel nut issue. Williams were criticised for the decision, particularly by Kubica's personal sponsors PKN Orlen. At the following race in Japan, Kubica criticised the team's decision to remove an upgraded front wing from his car for the race, after he had trialled it during practice sessions.

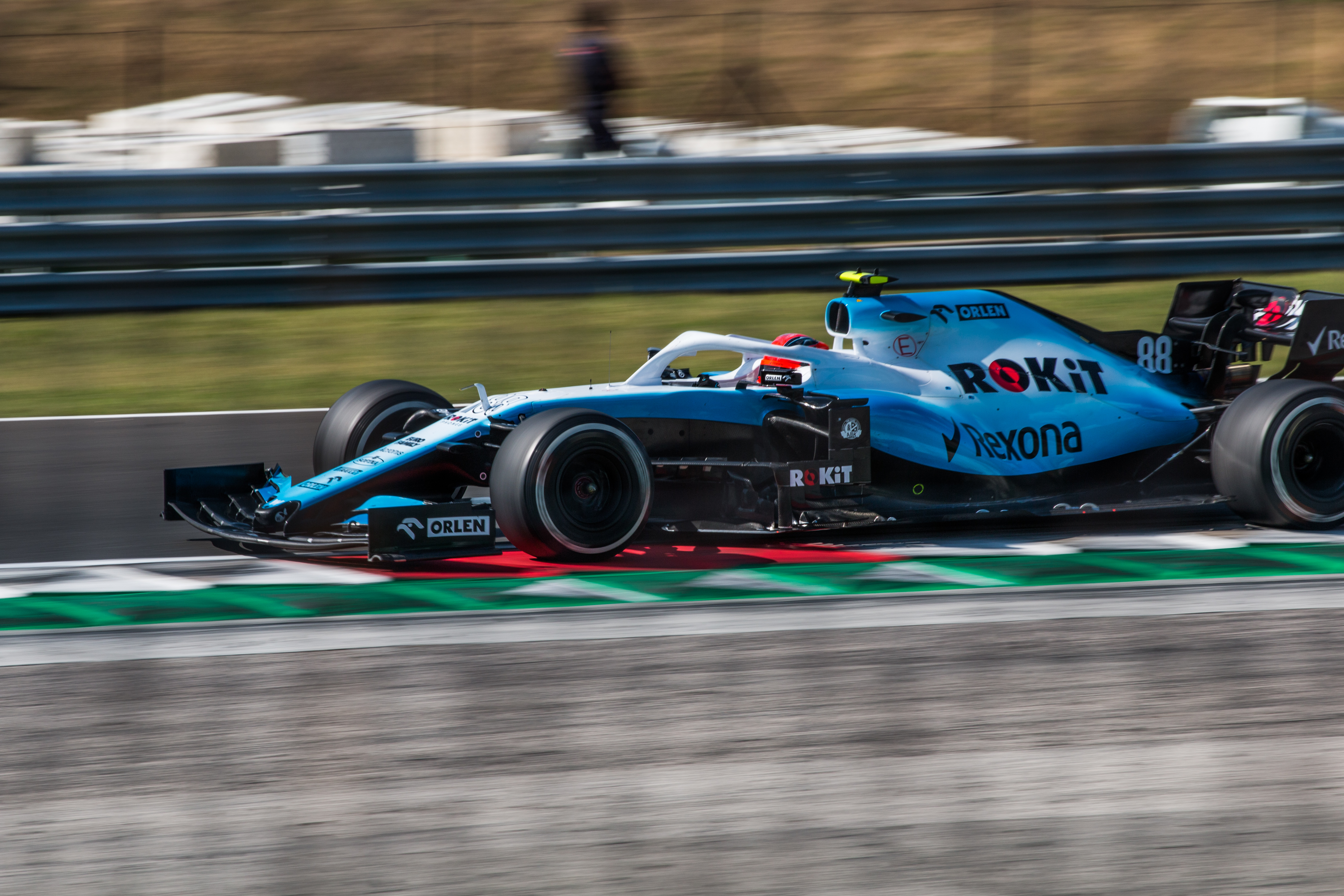
Kubica at the 2019 Hungarian Grand Prix

At the 2019 Brazilian Grand Prix, Kubica's Williams mechanics released him from his pit box too early, narrowly avoiding hitting Max Verstappen and holding him up in the pit lane.

Kubica ended a difficult season in 19th place in the championship with one point, finishing ahead of rookie teammate Russell in the standings. He decided to leave the team and was replaced by 2019 Formula 2 runner-up Nicholas Latifi.

=== Alfa Romeo (2020–2022) ===
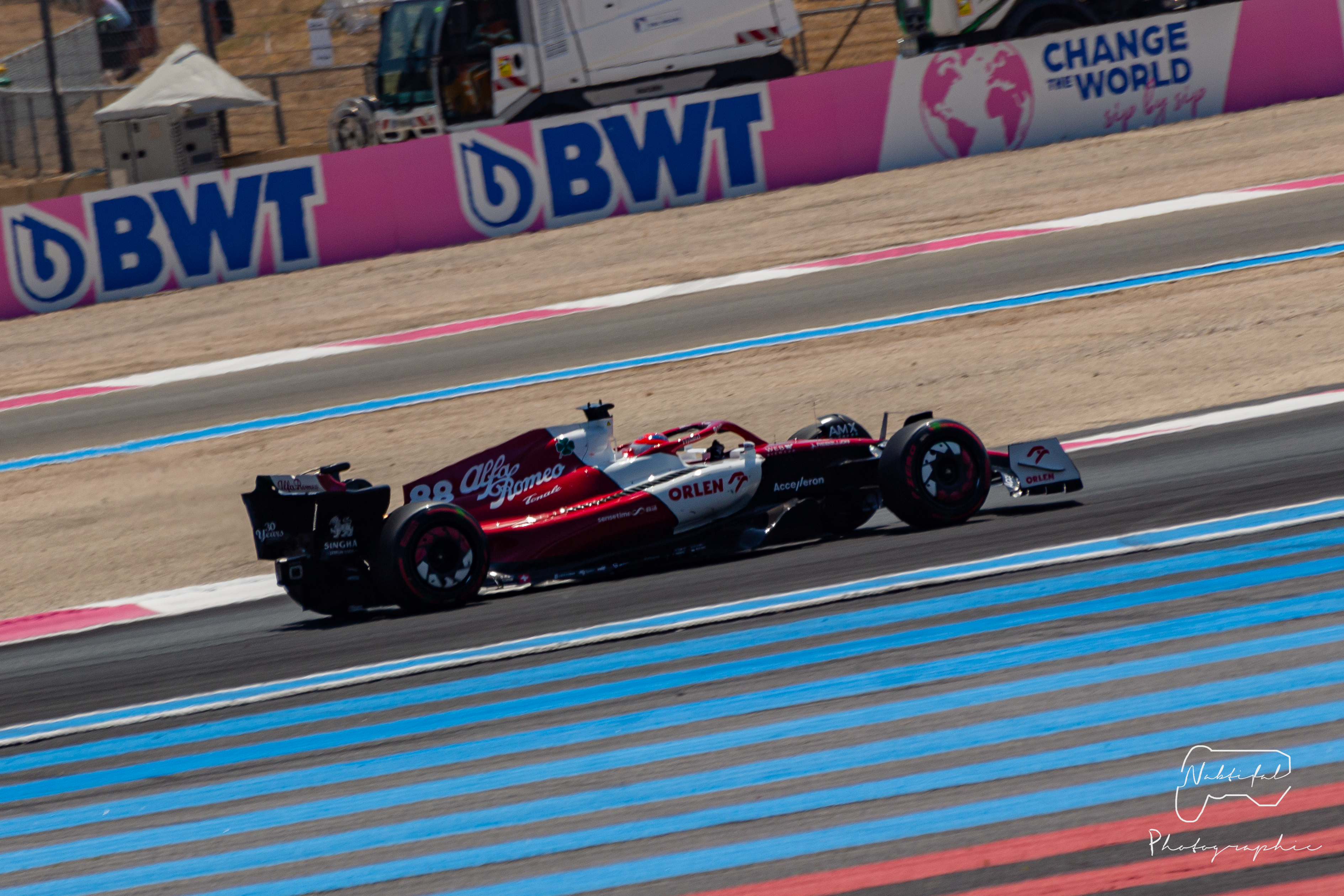
Kubica driving for Alfa Romeo during free practice for the 2022 French Grand Prix.

Kubica joined Alfa Romeo Racing in a reserve driver role for the 2020 season, returning to the team he made his Formula One debut with in 2006 (when it was still known as BMW Sauber). He competed at the pre-season test at the Circuit de Barcelona-Catalunya and set the fastest laptime during the fourth day of testing. He was joined by 2019 F2 Championship driver Tatiana Calderón. During the season, Kubica completed tests at the Styrian, Hungarian, 70th Anniversary, Bahrain and Abu Dhabi Grands Prix. He also participated in the season-ending Abu Dhabi Young Drivers Test.

Full-time Alfa Romeo driver Kimi Räikkönen tested positive for COVID-19 on the weekend of the Dutch Grand Prix, with Kubica replacing him. He went on to qualify 18th and finish the race in 15th, while his teammate Antonio Giovinazzi dropped from seventh to 14th. Kubica also deputised for Räikkönen in the Italian Grand Prix at Monza. After qualifying 19th, and finishing the sprint qualifying in 18th after making contact with Yuki Tsunoda on the opening lap, he eventually went on to finish the Grand Prix in 14th. Despite participating in only two races, Kubica finished the 2021 season in 20th place out of 21 drivers, ahead of Nikita Mazepin.

Prior to the two races in which he participated, Kubica drove in three free practice sessions in 2021 at the Spanish, Styrian and Hungarian Grands Prix, in addition to two days of Pirelli tyre testing for the 18-inch tyres.

For 2022, Kubica remained as a reserve and test driver. He took part in free practice for the Spanish, French, Hungarian and Abu Dhabi Grand Prix.

Alfa Romeo's main sponsor Orlen moved to Scuderia AlphaTauri for the 2023 F1 season, resulting in Kubica leaving the team.

== Later career ==
=== Endurance racing (2021–present) ===
In 2021, Kubica achieved success with Orlen Team WRT in the European Le Mans Series, marking his debut in endurance racing. His team secured victory in three rounds and won the LMP2 title.

Kubica joined High Class Racing for the final two rounds of the 2021 FIA World Endurance Championship season in Bahrain, replacing Jan Magnussen. He competed in both the 6 Hours and 8 Hours of Bahrain in November 2021 with Anders Fjordbach and Dennis Andersen, contributing to the Danish team clinching the podium twice in the ProAm class.

==== Prema (2022) ====
In January 2022, it was announced that Kubica would be joining the Prema Orlen Team to compete in the World Endurance Championship (WEC) during the 2022 season.

Throughout the 2022 season, Kubica competed in the World Endurance Championship across six races spanning three continents. This included prestigious events such as the 24 Hours of Le Mans at Circuit de la Sarthe and the 1,000-mile race at Sebring in the USA.

==== WRT (2023) ====
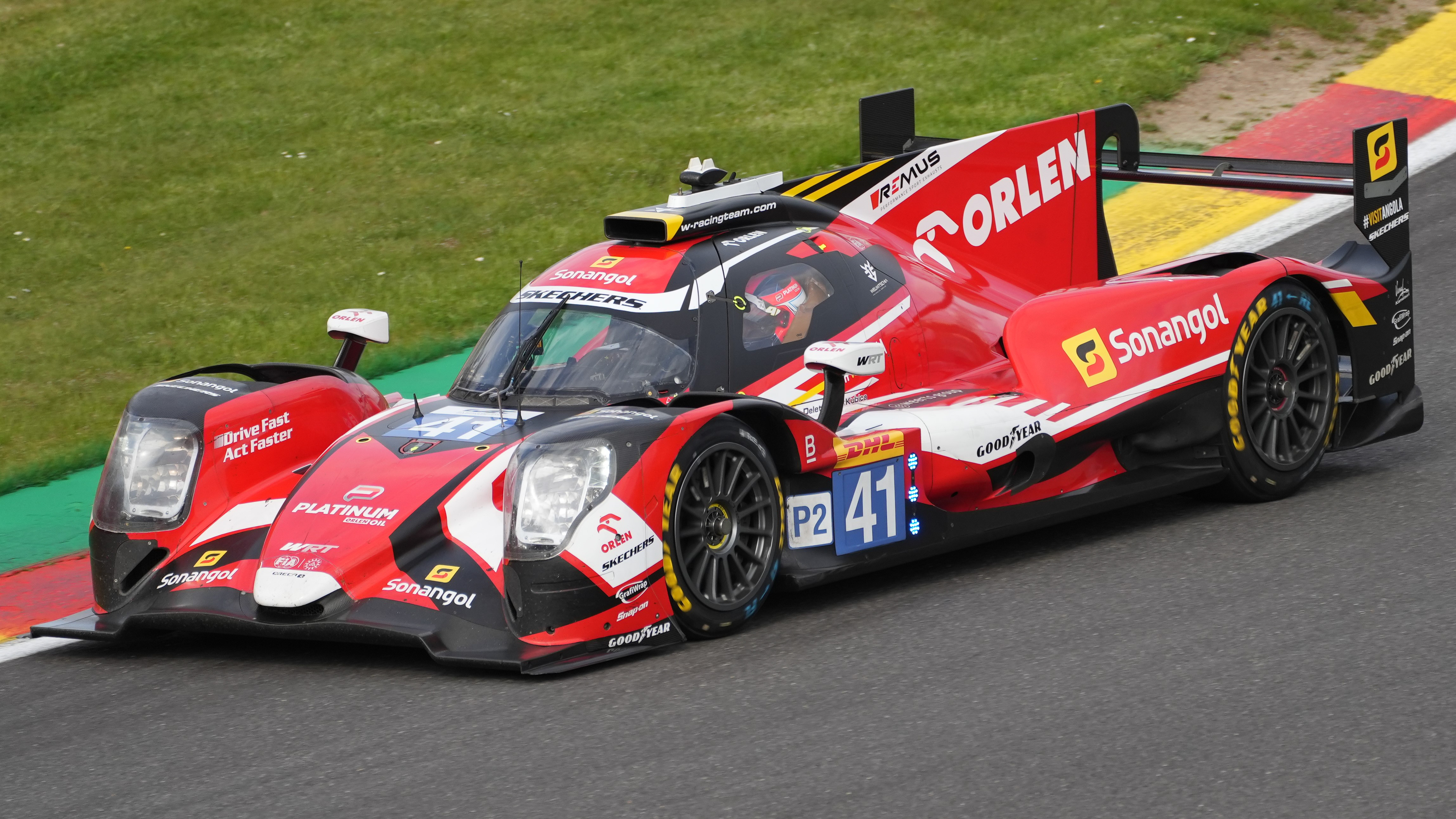
Kubica competing at the 2023 6 Hours of Spa-Francorchamps.

Kubica returned to WRT after a season spent with Prema. Kubica secured the LMP2 class championship.

==== AF Corse (2024–2026) ====
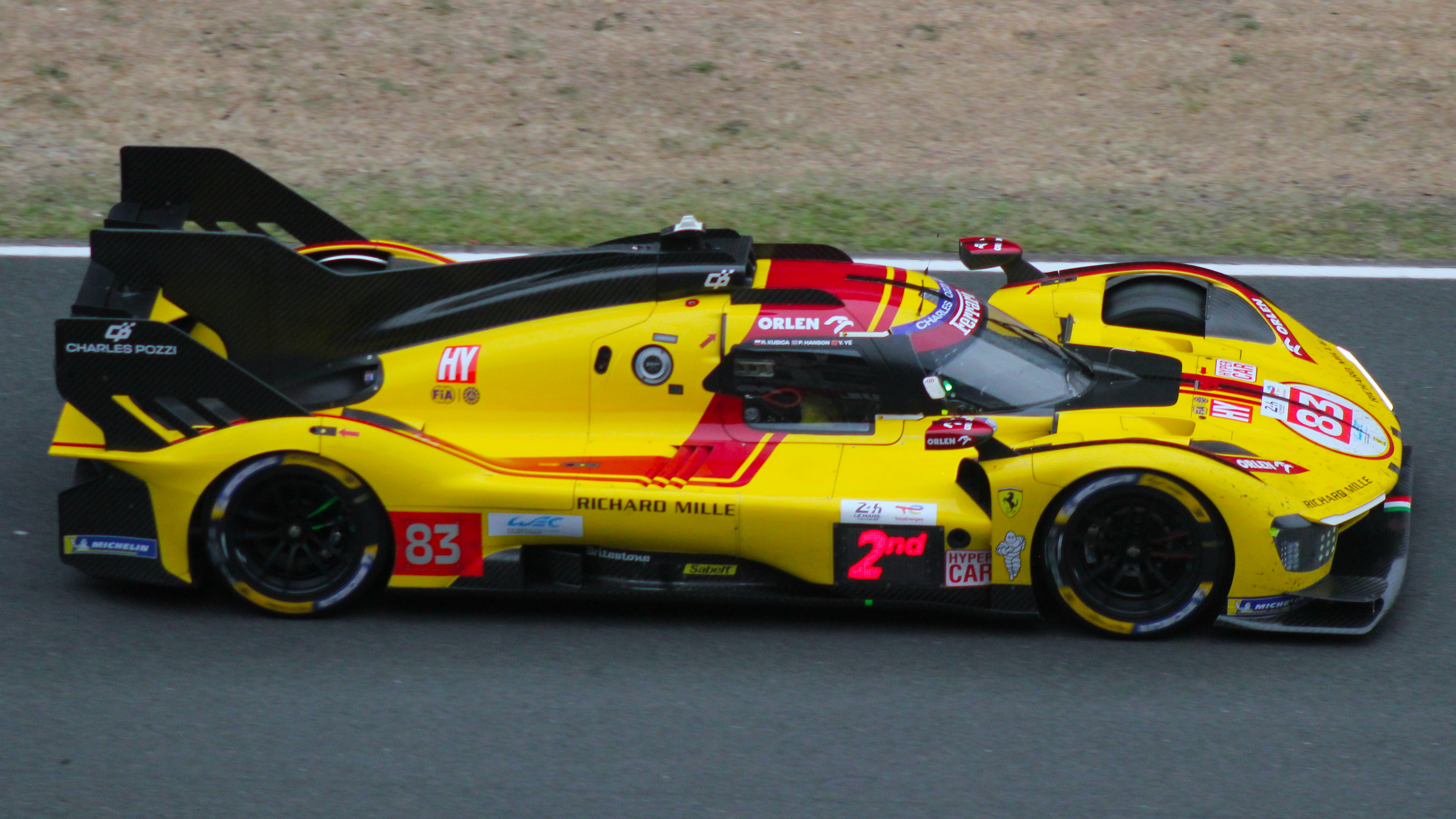
Kubica's race-winning No. 83 Ferrari car at the 2025 24 Hours of Le Mans

For the 2024 season, Kubica would step up to the Hypercar class to drive the No. 83 Ferrari 499P of AF Corse in the WEC, partnering Ye Yifei and Robert Shwartzman. On 1 September, he won the Lone Star Le Mans race becoming only the third racing driver in history to win a Formula 1 race and a WEC race after Fernando Alonso and Mark Webber. In 2025, Kubica took victory in the 24 Hours of Le Mans with teammates Phil Hanson and Ye Yifei. By doing so, Kubica became the first Polish driver to win the event overall.

In the final round of the 2025 FIA World Endurance Championship, the 8 Hours of Bahrain, Kubica finished second overall driving the No. 83 Ferrari 499P for AF Corse, alongside Phil Hanson and Yifei Ye. The crew maintained consistent pace across the closing stints and capitalized on strategic pit sequencing to secure the runner-up position behind the race-winning Toyota entry.

Shortly after the 2026 6 Hours of Monza finale, Kubica announced that he would leaving AF Corse at the end of the season.

== Karting record ==
=== Karting career summary ===
| Season | Series | Team | Position |
|---|---|---|---|
| 1995 | Polish Championship — Młodzik 02 | | 1st |
| 1996 | Polish Championship — Młodzik 02 | | 1st |
| 1997 | Polish Championship — Młodzik 02 | | 1st |
| 1997 | Polish Championship — Młodzik 01 | | 1st |
| 1997 | Polish Championship — Junior 100 | | 1st |
| 1998 | Italian Open Masters — ICA Junior | | 1st |
| 1998 | Monaco Kart Cup — ICA Junior | | 1st |
| 1998 | Andrea Margutti Trophy — 100 Junior | | 11th |
| 1998 | CIK-FIA Green Helmet Trophy – Cadet | | 2nd |
| 1998 | European Championship – ICA Junior | | 2nd |
| 1999 | Torneo Industrie Open – Formula A | | 13th |
| 1999 | South Garda Winter Cup – ICA Junior | | 3rd |
| 1999 | Italian Open Masters — ICA Junior | | 1st |
| 1999 | German Championship — Junior | | 1st |
| 1999 | Monaco Kart Cup — ICA Junior | | 1st |
| 1999 | Andrea Margutti Trophy — 100 Junior | CRG | 1st |
| 1999 | European Championship – ICA Junior | | 5th |
| 2000 | Andrea Margutti Trophy – Formula A | | 8th |
| 2000 | Torneo Industrie Open – Formula A | | 4th |
| 2000 | German Championship — Senior | | 6th |
| 2000 | European Championship – Formula A | | 4th |
| 2000 | World Championship — Senior | | 4th |
| 2001 | South Garda Winter Cup – Formula Super A | | 13th |
| 2001 | Andrea Margutti Trophy – Formula A | | 26th |

== Racing record ==
=== Career summary ===
| Season | Series | Team | Races | Wins | Poles | F/Laps | Podiums | Points | Position |
|---|---|---|---|---|---|---|---|---|---|
| 2001 | Formula Renault 2000 Eurocup | RC Motorsport | 10 | 0 | 1 | 0 | 1 | 46 | 14th |
| 2001 | Formula Renault 2000 Italy | RC Motorsport | 5 | 0 | 0 | 1 | 1 | 27 | 13th |
| 2002 | Formula Renault 2000 Eurocup | RC Motorsport | 8 | 0 | 1 | 0 | 2 | 80 | 7th |
| 2002 | Formula Renault 2000 Italy | RC Motorsport | 10 | 4 | 3 | 5 | 6 | 188 | **2nd** |
| 2002 | Formula Renault 2000 Brazil | RS2 | 1 | 1 | 1 | 1 | 1 | N/A | NC† |
| 2003 | Formula 3 Euro Series | Prema Powerteam | 14 | 1 | 0 | 3 | 2 | 31 | 12th |
| 2003 | British Formula 3 Championship | Prema Powerteam | 2 | 0 | 0 | 0 | 0 | N/A | NC† |
| 2003 | Masters of Formula 3 | Prema Powerteam | 1 | 0 | 0 | 0 | 0 | N/A | 33rd |
| 2003 | Macau Grand Prix | Target Racing | 1 | 0 | 0 | 0 | 0 | N/A | NC |
| 2003 | F3 Korea Super Prix | Target Racing | 1 | 0 | 0 | 0 | 0 | N/A | 6th |
| 2004 | Formula 3 Euro Series | Mücke Motorsport | 20 | 0 | 0 | 0 | 3 | 53 | 7th |
| 2004 | Macau Grand Prix | Manor Motorsport | 1 | 0 | 1 | 1 | 1 | N/A | **2nd** |
| 2005 | Formula Renault 3.5 Series | Epsilon Euskadi | 17 | 4 | 3 | 1 | 11 | 154 | **1st** |
| 2005 | Macau Grand Prix | Carlin Motorsport | 1 | 0 | 0 | 0 | 1 | N/A | **2nd** |
| 2005 | Formula One | Mild Seven Renault F1 Team | Test driver | | | | | | |
| 2006 | Formula One | BMW Sauber F1 Team | 6 | 0 | 0 | 0 | 1 | 6 | 16th |
| 2007 | Formula One | BMW Sauber F1 Team | 16 | 0 | 0 | 0 | 0 | 39 | 6th |
| 2008 | Formula One | BMW Sauber F1 Team | 18 | 1 | 1 | 0 | 7 | 75 | 4th |
| 2009 | Formula One | BMW Sauber F1 Team | 17 | 0 | 0 | 0 | 1 | 17 | 14th |
| 2010 | Formula One | Renault F1 Team | 19 | 0 | 0 | 1 | 3 | 136 | 8th |
| 2010 | Intercontinental Rally Challenge | Robert Kubica | 1 | 0 | – | – | 0 | 0 | NC |
| 2010 | Italian Rally Championship - 2WD | Robert Kubica | 2 | 2 | – | – | 2 | 20 | **2nd** |
| 2011 | Formula One | Lotus Renault GP | Test driver | | | | | | |
| 2013 | European Rally Championship | PH Sport | 4 | 0 | – | – | 0 | 17 | 29th |
| 2013 | WRC2 | Robert Kubica | 7 | 5 | – | – | 6 | 143 | **1st** |
| 2013 | World Rally Championship | Robert Kubica | 8 | 0 | – | – | 0 | 18 | 13th |
| 2014 | European Rally Championship | RK M-Sport WRT | 1 | 1 | – | – | 1 | 39 | 13th |
| 2014 | World Rally Championship | RK M-Sport World Rally Team | 13 | 0 | – | – | 0 | 14 | 16th |
| 2015 | World Rally Championship | Robert Kubica | 11 | 0 | – | – | 0 | 11 | 12th |
| 2016 | World Rally Championship | BRC Racing Team | 1 | 0 | – | – | 0 | 0 | NC |
| 2016 | Renault Sport Trophy - Pro | Duqueine Engineering | 1 | 0 | 0 | 0 | 0 | 0 | NC† |
| 2016 | Renault Sport Endurance Trophy | Duqueine Engineering | 1 | 0 | 0 | 0 | 1 | 0 | NC† |
| 2016 | 24H Series - A6 | MP Sports | 1 | 0 | 0 | 0 | 0 | 0 | NC |
| 2017 | 24H Series - A6 | Förch Racing powered by Olimp | 1 | 0 | 0 | 0 | 0 | 0 | NC |
| 2017 | Formula One | Renault Sport Formula One Team | Test driver | | | | | | |
| 2017 | Formula One | Williams Martini Racing | Test driver | | | | | | |
| 2018 | Formula One | Williams Martini Racing | Reserve driver | | | | | | |
| 2019 | Formula One | ROKiT Williams Racing | 21 | 0 | 0 | 0 | 0 | 1 | 19th |
| 2020 | Deutsche Tourenwagen Masters | Orlen Team ART | 18 | 0 | 0 | 0 | 1 | 20 | 15th |
| 2020 | Formula One | Alfa Romeo Racing Orlen | Test/Reserve driver | | | | | | |
| 2021 | European Le Mans Series - LMP2 | Team WRT | 6 | 3 | 0 | 0 | 4 | 118 | **1st** |
| 2021 | IMSA SportsCar Championship - LMP2 | High Class Racing | 1 | 0 | 0 | 0 | 0 | 0 | NC‡ |
| 2021 | FIA World Endurance Championship - LMP2 | High Class Racing | 2 | 0 | 0 | 0 | 0 | 10 | 21st |
| 2021 | Formula One | Alfa Romeo Racing Orlen | 2 | 0 | 0 | 0 | 0 | 0 | 20th |
| 2022 | FIA World Endurance Championship - LMP2 | Prema Orlen Team | 6 | 0 | 0 | 1 | 1 | 94 | 5th |
| 2022 | 24 Hours of Le Mans - LMP2 | Prema Orlen Team | 1 | 0 | 0 | 0 | 1 | N/A | **2nd** |
| 2022 | Formula One | Alfa Romeo F1 Team Orlen | Test/Reserve driver | | | | | | |
| 2023 | FIA World Endurance Championship - LMP2 | Team WRT | 7 | 3 | 1 | 0 | 6 | 173 | **1st** |
| 2023 | 24 Hours of Le Mans - LMP2 | Team WRT | 1 | 0 | 0 | 0 | 1 | N/A | **2nd** |
| 2024 | FIA World Endurance Championship - Hypercar | AF Corse | 8 | 1 | 0 | 0 | 1 | 57 | 9th |
| 2024 | European Le Mans Series - LMP2 | Orlen Team AO by TF | 6 | 1 | 1 | 0 | 4 | 93 | **1st** |
| 2025 | FIA World Endurance Championship - Hypercar | AF Corse | 8 | 1 | 1 | 0 | 2 | 117 | **2nd** |
| 2025 | 24 Hours of Le Mans - Hypercar | AF Corse | 1 | 1 | 0 | 0 | 1 | N/A | **1st** |
| 2026 | FIA World Endurance Championship - Hypercar | AF Corse | 8 | 0 | 0 | 0 | 0 | 49 | 14th |

^{†} As Kubica was a guest driver, he was ineligible to score points.
^{‡} Points only counted towards the Michelin Endurance Cup, and not the overall LMP2 Championship.

=== Complete Formula Renault 2.0 Italia results ===
(key) (Races in bold indicate pole position) (Races in italics indicate fastest lap)

| Year | Entrant | 1 | 2 | 3 | 4 | 5 | 6 | 7 | 8 | 9 | 10 | DC | Points |
|---|---|---|---|---|---|---|---|---|---|---|---|---|---|
| 2001 | RC Motorsport | VLL; 24 | PER | MGI | MNZ; 15 | MIS; 8 | VAR; Ret | IMO | MUG | BIN | EST; 3 | 13th | 27 |
| 2002 | RC Motorsport | **VAL**; 1 | **PER1**; 1 | PER2; 6 | SPA; 1 | MGI; 6 | MNZ; 3 | VAR; Ret | IMO; 1 | MIS; Ret | **MUG**; 3 | 2nd | 188 |

=== Complete Formula Renault 2.0 Eurocup results ===
(key) (Races in bold indicate pole position) (Races in italics indicate fastest lap)

| Year | Entrant | 1 | 2 | 3 | 4 | 5 | 6 | 7 | 8 | 9 | 10 | DC | Points |
|---|---|---|---|---|---|---|---|---|---|---|---|---|---|
| 2001 | RC Motorsport | MNZ; Ret | BRN; Ret | MAG; 15 | SIL; 21 | ZOL; Ret | HUN; 6 | **A1R**; Ret | NÜR; 12 | JAR; 6 | EST; 2 | 14th | 46 |
| 2002 | RC Motorsport | **MAG**; 2 | SIL; 4 | JAR; 13 | AND; 3 | OSC; 10 | SPA; Ret | IMO; 27 | DON | EST; 4 | | 7th | 80 |

=== Complete Formula 3 Euro Series results ===
(key) (Races in bold indicate pole position) (Races in italics indicate fastest lap)

| Year | Entrant | Chassis | Engine | 1 | 2 | 3 | 4 | 5 | 6 | 7 | 8 | 9 | 10 | 11 | 12 | 13 | 14 | 15 | 16 | 17 | 18 | 19 | 20 | DC | Points |
|---|---|---|---|---|---|---|---|---|---|---|---|---|---|---|---|---|---|---|---|---|---|---|---|---|---|
| 2003 | Prema Powerteam | Dallara F303/022 | Spiess-Opel | HOC; 1 | HOC; 2 | ADR; 1 | ADR; 2 | PAU; 1 | PAU; 2 | NOR; 1; 1 | NOR; 2; 2 | LMS; 1; 27 | LMS; 2; 7 | NÜR; 1; 9 | NÜR; 2; 6 | A1R; 1; 11 | A1R; 2 Ret | ZAN; 1; 7 | ZAN; 2; 24 | HOC; 1; 24 | HOC; 2; 10 | MAG; 1; 4 | MAG; 2; 8 | 12th | 31 |
| 2004 | Mücke Motorsport | Dallara F302/032 | HWA-Mercedes | HOC; 1; 6 | HOC; 2; 7 | EST; 1; 9 | EST; 2; 23 | ADR; 1; 17 | ADR; 1 Ret | PAU; 1; 3 | PAU; 2; 2 | NOR; 1; 19 | NOR; 1; 4 | MAG; 1; 9 | MAG; 2; 5 | NÜR; 1; 5 | NÜR; 2; 2 | ZAN; 1; 8 | ZAN; 2; 5 | BRN; 1; 10 | BRN; 2; 8 | HOC; 1; 4 | HOC; 2; 7 | 7th | 53 |

=== Complete Formula Renault 3.5 Series results ===
(key) (Races in bold indicate pole position) (Races in italics indicate fastest lap)

| Year | Entrant | 1 | 2 | 3 | 4 | 5 | 6 | 7 | 8 | 9 | 10 | 11 | 12 | 13 | 14 | 15 | 16 | 17 | DC | Points |
|---|---|---|---|---|---|---|---|---|---|---|---|---|---|---|---|---|---|---|---|---|
| 2005 | Epsilon Euskadi | ZOL; 1; 3 | ZOL; 2; 1 | MON; 1; 5 | VAL; 1; 2 | VAL; 2; 16 | LMS; 1; 3 | **LMS**; **2**; 2 | **BIL**; **1**; 1 | BIL; 2; 8 | OSC; 1; 1 | **OSC**; **2**; 1 | DON; 1; 3 | DON; 2; 6 | EST; 1; 2 | EST; 2; 3 | MNZ; 1 Ret | MNZ; 2 Ret | 1st | 154 |

=== Complete Formula One results ===
(key) (Races in bold indicate pole position) (Races in italics indicate fastest lap)

| Year | Entrant | Chassis | Engine | 1 | 2 | 3 | 4 | 5 | 6 | 7 | 8 | 9 | 10 | 11 | 12 | 13 | 14 | 15 | 16 | 17 | 18 | 19 | 20 | 21 | 22 | WDC | Points |
|---|---|---|---|---|---|---|---|---|---|---|---|---|---|---|---|---|---|---|---|---|---|---|---|---|---|---|---|
| 2006 | BMW Sauber F1 Team | BMW Sauber F1.06 | BMW P86 2.4 V8 | BHR; TD | MAL; TD | AUS; TD | SMR; TD | EUR; TD | ESP; TD | MON; TD | GBR; TD | CAN; TD | USA; TD | FRA; TD | GER; TD | HUN; DSQ | TUR; 12 | ITA; 3 | CHN; 13 | JPN; 9 | BRA; 9 | | | | | 16th | 6 |
| 2007 | BMW Sauber F1 Team | BMW Sauber F1.07 | BMW P86/7 2.4 V8 | AUS; Ret | MAL; 18 | BHR; 6 | ESP; 4 | MON; 5 | CAN; Ret | USA | FRA; 4 | GBR; 4 | EUR; 7 | HUN; 5 | TUR; 8 | ITA; 5 | BEL; 9 | JPN; 7 | CHN; Ret | BRA; 5 | | | | | | 6th | 39 |
| 2008 | BMW Sauber F1 Team | BMW Sauber F1.08 | BMW P86/8 2.4 V8 | AUS; Ret | MAL; 2 | **BHR**; 3 | ESP; 4 | TUR; 4 | MON; 2 | CAN; 1 | FRA; 5 | GBR; Ret | GER; 7 | HUN; 8 | EUR; 3 | BEL; 6 | ITA; 3 | SIN; 11 | JPN; 2 | CHN; 6 | BRA; 11 | | | | | 4th | 75 |
| 2009 | BMW Sauber F1 Team | BMW Sauber F1.09 | BMW P86/9 2.4 V8 | AUS; 14^{†} | MAL; Ret | CHN; 13 | BHR; 18 | ESP; 11 | MON; Ret | TUR; 7 | GBR; 13 | GER; 14 | HUN; 13 | EUR; 8 | BEL; 4 | ITA; Ret | SIN; 8 | JPN; 9 | BRA; 2 | ABU; 10 | | | | | | 14th | 17 |
| 2010 | Renault F1 Team | Renault R30 | Renault RS27-2010 2.4 V8 | BHR; 11 | AUS; 2 | MAL; 4 | CHN; 5 | ESP; 8 | MON; 3 | TUR; 6 | CAN; 7 | EUR; 5 | GBR; Ret | GER; 7 | HUN; Ret | BEL; 3 | ITA; 8 | SIN; 7 | JPN; Ret | KOR; 5 | BRA; 9 | ABU; 5 | | | | 8th | 136 |
| 2018 | Williams Martini Racing | Williams FW41 | Mercedes M09 EQ Power+ 1.6 V6 t | AUS | BHR | CHN | AZE | ESP; TD | MON | CAN | FRA | AUT; TD | GBR | GER | HUN | BEL | ITA | SIN | RUS | JPN | USA | MEX | BRA | ABU; TD | | – | – |
| 2019 | ROKiT Williams Racing | Williams FW42 | Mercedes M10 EQ Power+ 1.6 V6 t | AUS; 17 | BHR; 16 | CHN; 17 | AZE; 16 | ESP; 18 | MON; 18 | CAN; 18 | FRA; 18 | AUT; 20 | GBR; 15 | GER; 10 | HUN; 19 | BEL; 17 | ITA; 17 | SIN; 16 | RUS; Ret | JPN; 17 | MEX; 18 | USA; Ret | BRA; 16 | ABU; 19 | | 19th | 1 |
| 2020 | Alfa Romeo Racing Orlen | Alfa Romeo Racing C39 | Ferrari 065 1.6 V6 t | AUT | STY; TD | HUN; TD | GBR | 70A; TD | ESP | BEL | ITA | TUS | RUS | EIF | POR | EMI | TUR | BHR; TD | SKH | ABU; TD | | | | | | – | – |
| 2021 | Alfa Romeo Racing Orlen | Alfa Romeo Racing C41 | Ferrari 065/6 1.6 V6 t | BHR | EMI | POR | ESP; TD | MON | AZE | FRA | STY; TD | AUT | GBR | HUN; TD | BEL | NED; 15 | ITA; 14 | RUS | TUR | USA | MXC | SAP | QAT | SAU | ABU | 20th | 0 |
| 2022 | Alfa Romeo F1 Team Orlen | Alfa Romeo C42 | Ferrari 066/7 1.6 V6 t | BHR | SAU | AUS | EMI | MIA | ESP; TD | MON | AZE | CAN | GBR | AUT | FRA; TD | HUN; TD | BEL | NED | ITA | SIN | JPN | USA | MXC | SAP | ABU; TD | – | – |

^{†} Did not finish, but was classified as he had completed more than 90% of the race distance.

=== Complete World Rally Championship results ===
| Year | Entrant | Car | 1 | 2 | 3 | 4 | 5 | 6 | 7 | 8 | 9 | 10 | 11 | 12 | 13 | 14 | Pos. | Points |
|---|---|---|---|---|---|---|---|---|---|---|---|---|---|---|---|---|---|---|
| 2013 | Robert Kubica | Citroën DS3 RRC | MON | SWE | MEX | POR; 19 | ARG | GRE; 11 | ITA; 9 | FIN; 9 | GER; 5 | AUS | FRA; 9 | ESP; 9 | | | 13th | 18 |
| 2013 | Abu Dhabi Citroën Total WRT | Citroën DS3 WRC | | | | | | | | | | | | | GBR; Ret | | 13th | 18 |
| 2014 | RK M-Sport World Rally Team | Ford Fiesta RS WRC | MON; Ret | SWE; 24 | MEX; Ret | POR; Ret | ARG; 6 | ITA; 8 | POL; 20 | FIN; 34 | GER; Ret | AUS; 9 | FRA; Ret | ESP; 17 | GBR; 11 | | 16th | 14 |
| 2015 | Robert Kubica | Ford Fiesta RS WRC | MON; Ret | SWE; 20 | MEX; 18 | ARG | POR; 9 | ITA; 30 | POL; 8 | FIN; Ret | GER; 35 | AUS | FRA; 22 | ESP; 11 | GBR; 8 | | 12th | 11 |
| 2016 | BRC Racing Team | Ford Fiesta RS WRC | MON; Ret | SWE; WD | MEX | ARG | POR | ITA | POL | FIN | GER | CHN; C | FRA | ESP | GBR | AUS | NC | 0 |

=== Complete WRC2 results ===
| Year | Entrant | Car | 1 | 2 | 3 | 4 | 5 | 6 | 7 | 8 | 9 | 10 | 11 | 12 | 13 | Pos. | Points |
|---|---|---|---|---|---|---|---|---|---|---|---|---|---|---|---|---|---|
| 2013 | Robert Kubica | Citroën DS3 RRC | MON | SWE | MEX | POR; 6 | ARG | GRE; 1 | ITA; 1 | FIN; 2 | GER; 1 | AUS | FRA; 1 | ESP; 1 | GBR | 1st | 143 |

=== Complete European Rally Championship results ===
| Year | Entrant | Car | 1 | 2 | 3 | 4 | 5 | 6 | 7 | 8 | 9 | 10 | 11 | 12 | Pos. | Points |
|---|---|---|---|---|---|---|---|---|---|---|---|---|---|---|---|---|
| 2013 | PH Sport | Citroën DS3 RRC | JÄN | LIE | CAN; Ret | AZO; 6 | COR; Ret | YPR | ROM | CZE | POL; Ret | CRO | SAN | VAL | 29th | 17 |
| 2014 | RK M-Sport WRT | Ford Fiesta RRC | JÄN; 1 | LIE | ROM | ACR | IRE | AZO | YPR | EST | CZE | CYP | VAL | COR | 13th | 39 |

=== Complete Deutsche Tourenwagen Masters results ===
(key) (Races in bold indicate pole position; races in italics indicate fastest lap)

| Year | Entrant | Chassis | 1 | 2 | 3 | 4 | 5 | 6 | 7 | 8 | 9 | 10 | 11 | 12 | 13 | 14 | 15 | 16 | 17 | 18 | Rank | Points |
|---|---|---|---|---|---|---|---|---|---|---|---|---|---|---|---|---|---|---|---|---|---|---|
| 2020 | Orlen Team ART | BMW M4 Turbo DTM | SPA; 1; 14 | SPA; 2; 14 | LAU; 1; 13 | LAU; 2; 13 | LAU; 1; 16 | LAU; 2; 16 | ASS; 1; 10 | ASS; 2; 14 | NÜR; 1; 16 | NÜR; 2; 12 | NÜR; 1; 13 | NÜR; 2 Ret | ZOL; 1; 14 | ZOL; 2; 12 | ZOL; 1 Ret | ZOL; 2; 3 | HOC; 1; 8 | HOC; 2; 15 | 15th | 20 |

=== Complete IMSA SportsCar Championship results ===
(key) (Races in bold indicate pole position; races in italics indicate fastest lap)

| Year | Entrant | Class | Make | Engine | 1 | 2 | 3 | 4 | 5 | 6 | 7 | Rank | Points |
|---|---|---|---|---|---|---|---|---|---|---|---|---|---|
| 2021 | High Class Racing | LMP2 | Oreca 07 | Gibson GK428 4.2 L V8 | DAY; 9† | SEB | WGL | WGL | ELK | LGA | PET | NC† | 0† |

^{†} Points only counted towards the Michelin Endurance Cup, and not the overall LMP2 Championship.

=== Complete European Le Mans Series results ===
(key) (Races in bold indicate pole position; results in italics indicate fastest lap)

| Year | Entrant | Class | Chassis | Engine | 1 | 2 | 3 | 4 | 5 | 6 | Rank | Points |
|---|---|---|---|---|---|---|---|---|---|---|---|---|
| 2021 | Team WRT | LMP2 | Oreca 07 | Gibson GK428 4.2 L V8 | CAT; 1 | RBR; 1 | LEC; 5 | MNZ; 4 | SPA; 1 | ALG; 2 | 1st | 118 |
| 2024 | Orlen Team AO by TF | LMP2 | Oreca 07 | Gibson GK428 4.2 L V8 | CAT; 7 | LEC; 3 | IMO; 2 | **SPA**; 1 | MUG; 5 | ALG; 2 | 1st | 93 |

=== Complete 24 Hours of Le Mans results ===
| Year | Team | Co-Drivers | Car | Class | Laps | Pos. | Class Pos. |
|---|---|---|---|---|---|---|---|
| 2021 | (Belgium) Team WRT | (Switzerland) Louis Delétraz (China) Yifei Ye | Oreca 07-Gibson | LMP2 | 362 | NC | NC |
| 2022 | (Italy) Prema Orlen Team | (Italy) Lorenzo Colombo (Switzerland) Louis Delétraz | Oreca 07-Gibson | LMP2 | 369 | 6th | **2nd** |
| 2023 | (Belgium) Team WRT | (Angola) Rui Andrade (Switzerland) Louis Delétraz | Oreca 07-Gibson | LMP2 | 328 | 11th | **2nd** |
| 2024 | (Italy) AF Corse | (Israel) Robert Shwartzman (China) Yifei Ye | Ferrari 499P | Hypercar | 248 | DNF | DNF |
| 2025 | (Italy) AF Corse | (United Kingdom) Phil Hanson (China) Yifei Ye | Ferrari 499P | Hypercar | 387 | **1st** | **1st** |
| 2026 | (Italy) AF Corse | (United Kingdom) Phil Hanson (China) Yifei Ye | Ferrari 499P | Hypercar | 381 | 7th | 7th |

=== Complete FIA World Endurance Championship results ===
(key) (Races in bold indicate pole position) (Races in italics indicate fastest lap)

| Year | Entrant | Class | Chassis | Engine | 1 | 2 | 3 | 4 | 5 | 6 | 7 | 8 | 9 | Rank | Points |
|---|---|---|---|---|---|---|---|---|---|---|---|---|---|---|---|
| 2017 | ByKolles Racing Team | LMP1 | ENSO CLM P1/01 | Nismo VRX30A 3.0 L Turbo V6 | SIL; DNA | SPA | LMS | NÜR | MEX | COA | FUJ | SHA | BHR | NC | 0 |
| 2021 | Team WRT | LMP2 | Oreca 07 | Gibson GK428 4.2 L V8 | SPA | ALG | MNZ | LMS; NC | | | | | | 21st | 10 |
| 2021 | High Class Racing | LMP2 | Oreca 07 | Gibson GK428 4.2 L V8 | | | | | BHR; 8 | BHR; 8 | | | | 21st | 10 |
| 2022 | Prema Orlen Team | LMP2 | Oreca 07 | Gibson GK428 4.2 L V8 | SEB; 4 | SPA; 7 | LMS; 2 | MNZ; 6 | FUJ; 6 | BHR; 4 | | | | 5th | 94 |
| 2023 | Team WRT | LMP2 | Oreca 07 | Gibson GK428 4.2 L V8 | SEB; 4 | ALG; 3 | SPA; 1 | LMS; 2 | MNZ; 3 | FUJ; 1 | BHR; 1 | | | 1st | 173 |
| 2024 | AF Corse | Hypercar | Ferrari 499P | Ferrari F163CG 3.0 L Turbo V6 | QAT; 4 | IMO; 8 | SPA; 8 | LMS; Ret | SÃO; 11 | COA; 1 | FUJ; 12 | BHR; 8 | | 9th | 57 |
| 2025 | AF Corse | Hypercar | Ferrari 499P | Ferrari F163CG 3.0 L Turbo V6 | QAT; 2 | IMO; 4 | SPA; 15 | LMS; 1 | SÃO; 8 | **COA**; 7 | FUJ; 9 | BHR; 5 | | 2nd | 117 |
| 2026 | AF Corse | Hypercar | Ferrari 499P | Ferrari F163CG 3.0 L Turbo V6 | IMO; 10 | SPA; 6 | LMS; 7 | SÃO; 5 | COA; 13 | FUJ; 12 | CAT; 5 | MNZ; 6 | | 14th | 49 |

Sporting positions
| Preceded by Heikki Kovalainen | Formula Renault 3.5 Series; Champion; 2005 | Succeeded by Alx Danielsson |
| Preceded by Craig Breen (S-WRC) | WRC2; Champion; 2013 | Succeeded by Nasser Al-Attiyah |
| Preceded by Phil Hanson; Filipe Albuquerque | European Le Mans Series; LMP2 Champion; 2021; With: Yifei Ye & Louis Delétraz | Succeeded by Louis Delétraz; Ferdinand Habsburg |
| Preceded by António Félix da Costa; Roberto González; Will Stevens | FIA Endurance Trophy for LMP2 Drivers; 2023; With: Rui Andrade & Louis Delétraz | Succeeded by None (Class discontinued) |
| Preceded by Alex Lynn; Kyffin Simpson; James Allen | European Le Mans Series; LMP2 Champion; 2024; With: Louis Delétraz & Jonny Edgar | Succeeded by Oliver Gray; Esteban Masson; Charles Milesi |
| Preceded by Antonio Fuoco; Miguel Molina; Nicklas Nielsen | Winner of the 24 Hours of Le Mans; 2025; With: Phil Hanson & Yifei Ye | Succeeded by Incumbent |
Awards
| Preceded by Felipe Massa | Lorenzo Bandini Trophy; 2008 | Succeeded by Sebastian Vettel |
| Preceded by Inaugural | FIA Personality of the Year; 2013 | Succeeded by Lewis Hamilton |
