= Mario Theissen =

German motorsport engineer

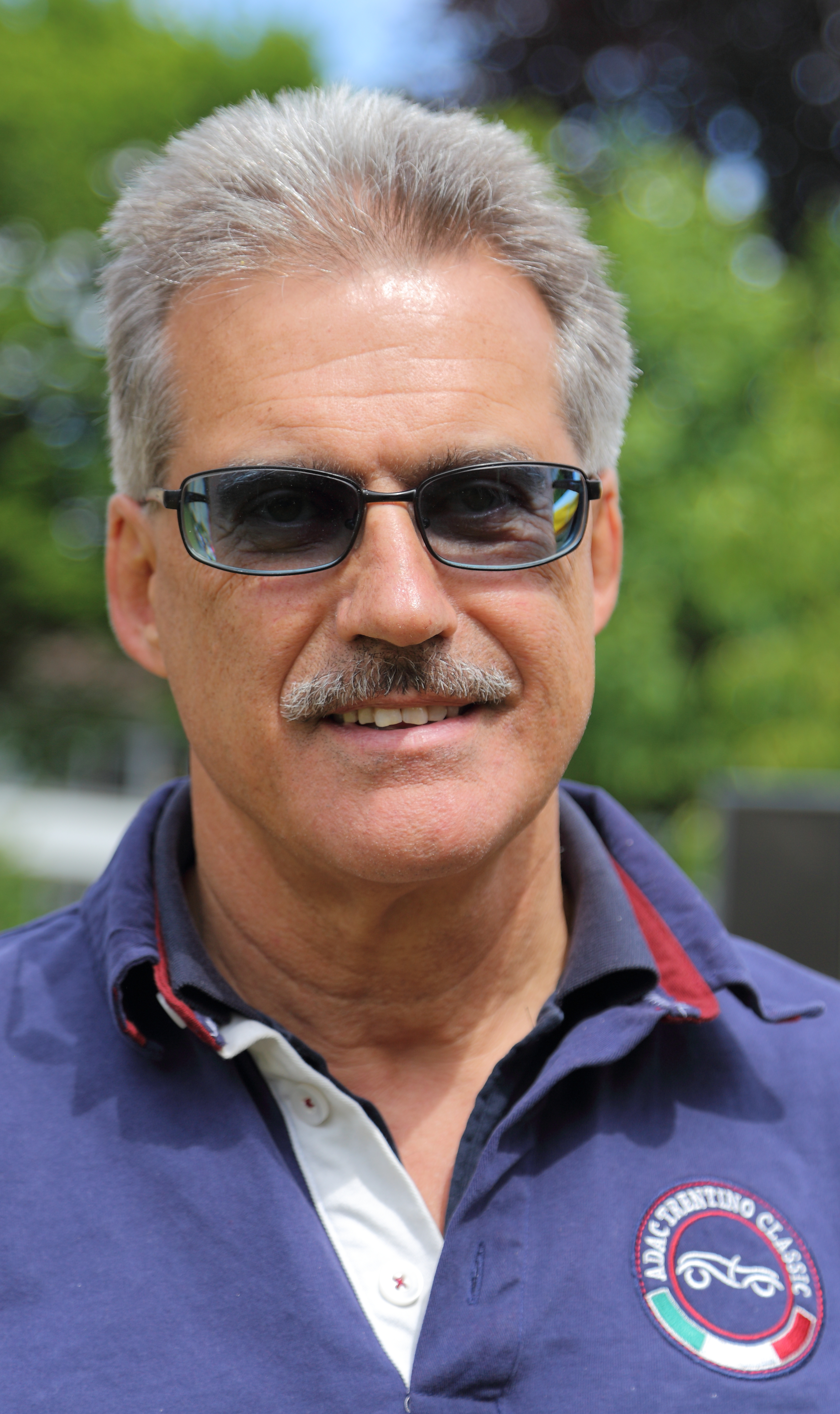
- Mario Theissen (2015)
- Born: 17 August 1952 (age 73)

Mario Albert Theissen (born 17 August 1952 in Monschau, Germany) is the former BMW Motorsport Director and was team principal of BMW Sauber, the company's Formula One team from 2005 until 2009, when BMW sold the team back to Peter Sauber.

== Career ==
After graduating from RWTH Aachen University with a diplom in mechanical engineering, Theissen joined BMW in the engine calculation department in 1977. Over the following years he took on various responsibilities in BMW's engine development division and in 1989 gained a doctorate in engineering from the Ruhr University in Bochum. In 1991 he was made head of Product Concepts at BMW and a year later became Director of Advanced Drivetrain Development. In 1994 he was promoted to Director of BMW Technik GmbH.

In 1998, in addition to his job as head of BMW Technik, he took on the task of setting up the BMW Technology Office in Palo Alto, California.

He became BMW Motorsport Director alongside Gerhard Berger in April 1999 with oversight of BMW's Formula One team and other motorsport activities, including BMW's factory entries in the World Touring Car Championship and the 24 Hours of Le Mans.

BMW entered Formula One supplying turbo engines to Brabham in the 1980s, and Nelson Piquet became world champion with that car in 1983. Later, BMW set a partnership agreement with Williams Racing in 1998. In 2001, BMW was credited with having the most powerful engine on the grid. While achieving notable successes, such as a strong championship challenge in 2003, the relationship between team and engine maker began to deteriorate. During the course of the 2004 and 2005 F1 seasons, Theissen increasingly became publicly critical of the Williams team's inability to create a package capable of winning the constructor's championship or even multiple victories within a single season. However, Williams blamed BMW for not producing a good enough engine. This public deterioration of the relationship between BMW and Williams, and between Theissen and Patrick Head in particular, was a factor in BMW's decision to buy Sauber.

Theissen was made team principal of the resulting BMW Sauber team, and in their first season, they achieved 5th in the constructors championship, both a considerable improvement on Sauber's previous season and a match for Williams' previous position in the standings. In 2007 the BMW Sauber team finished 2nd in the World Constructors Championship after McLaren-Mercedes were excluded following a spying episode. In the 2008 Canadian Grand Prix Robert Kubica led Nick Heidfeld to finish first and second, giving BMW its first victory as a constructor. After BMW's decision to sell the team back to Peter Sauber and depart from Formula 1, Theissen decided to leave the sport as well but retain his position as BMW Motorsport Director.

Theissen retired from BMW on 30 June 2011, to be replaced by Jens Marquardt.
