= 2012 Formula One World Championship =

Motor racing championship

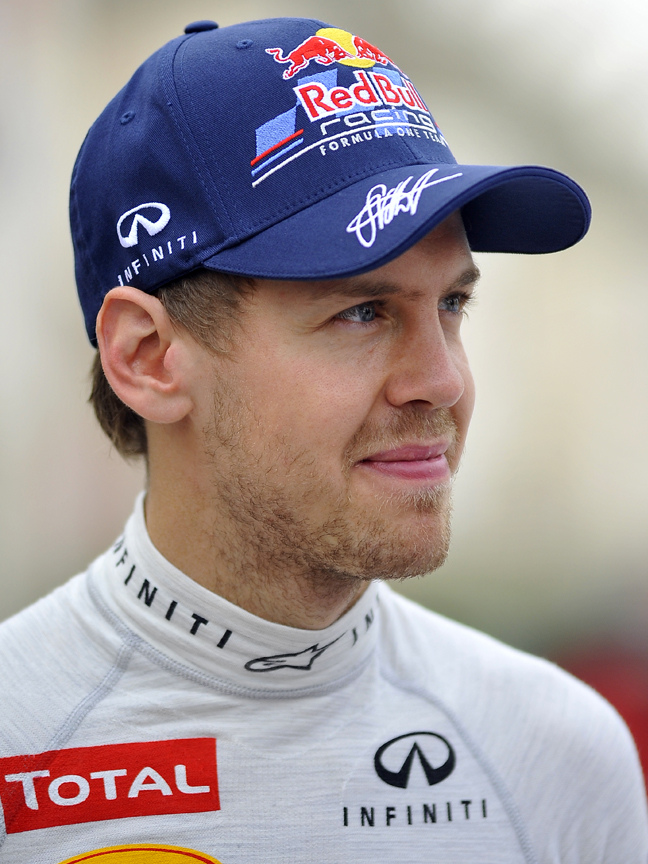
Reigning Champion Sebastian Vettel became a three-time World Champion with Red Bull Racing.

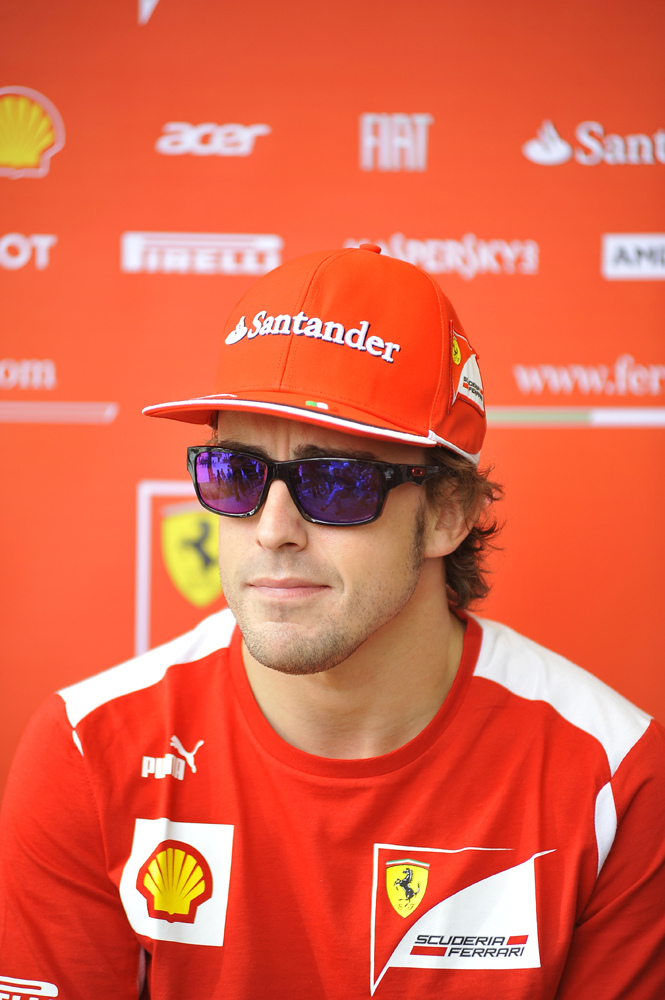
Two-time Champion Fernando Alonso, driving for Ferrari, finished runner-up, three points behind Vettel.

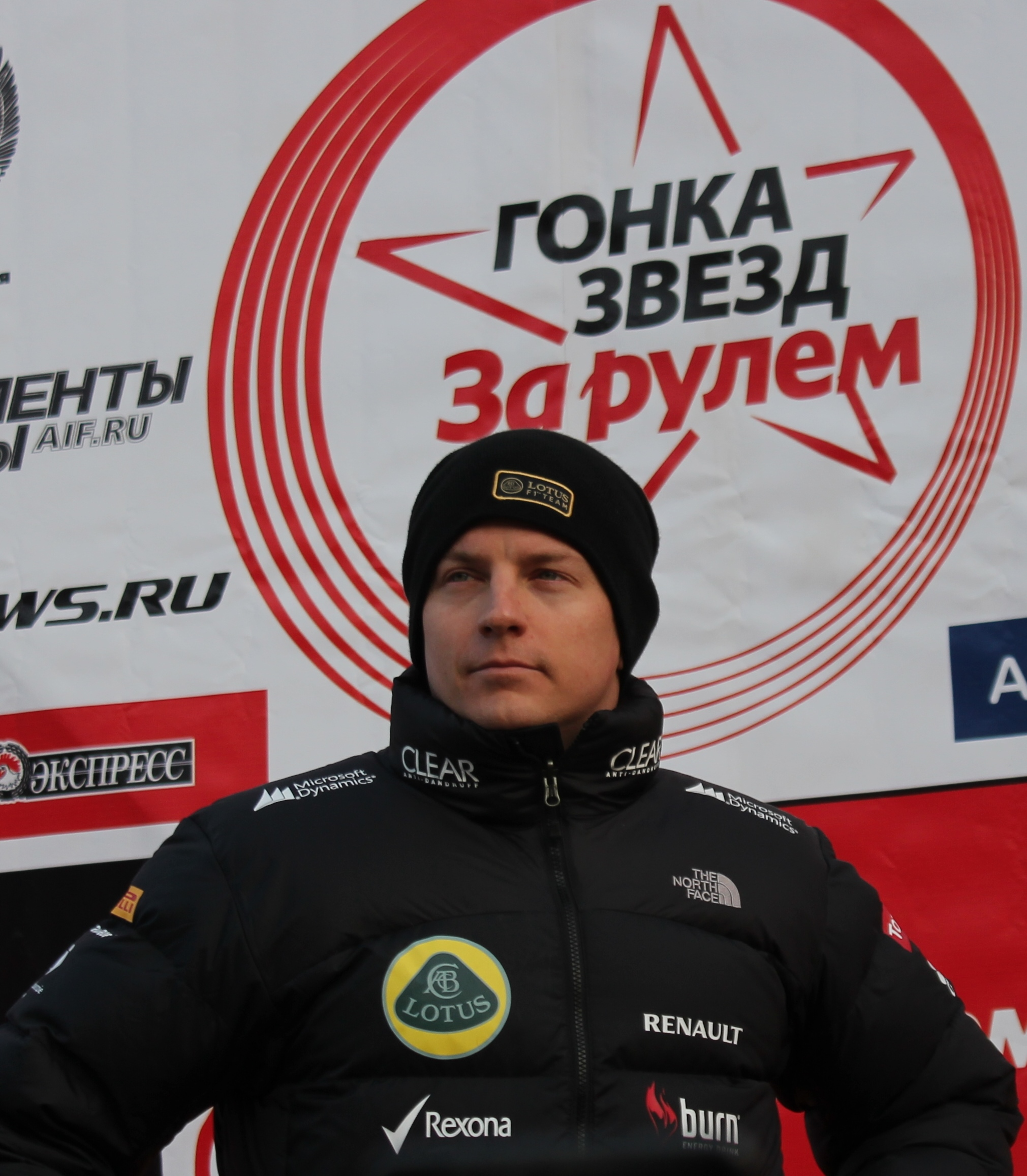
2007 Champion Kimi Räikkönen (pictured in 2013) finished the season in third place on his return to F1, driving for Lotus.

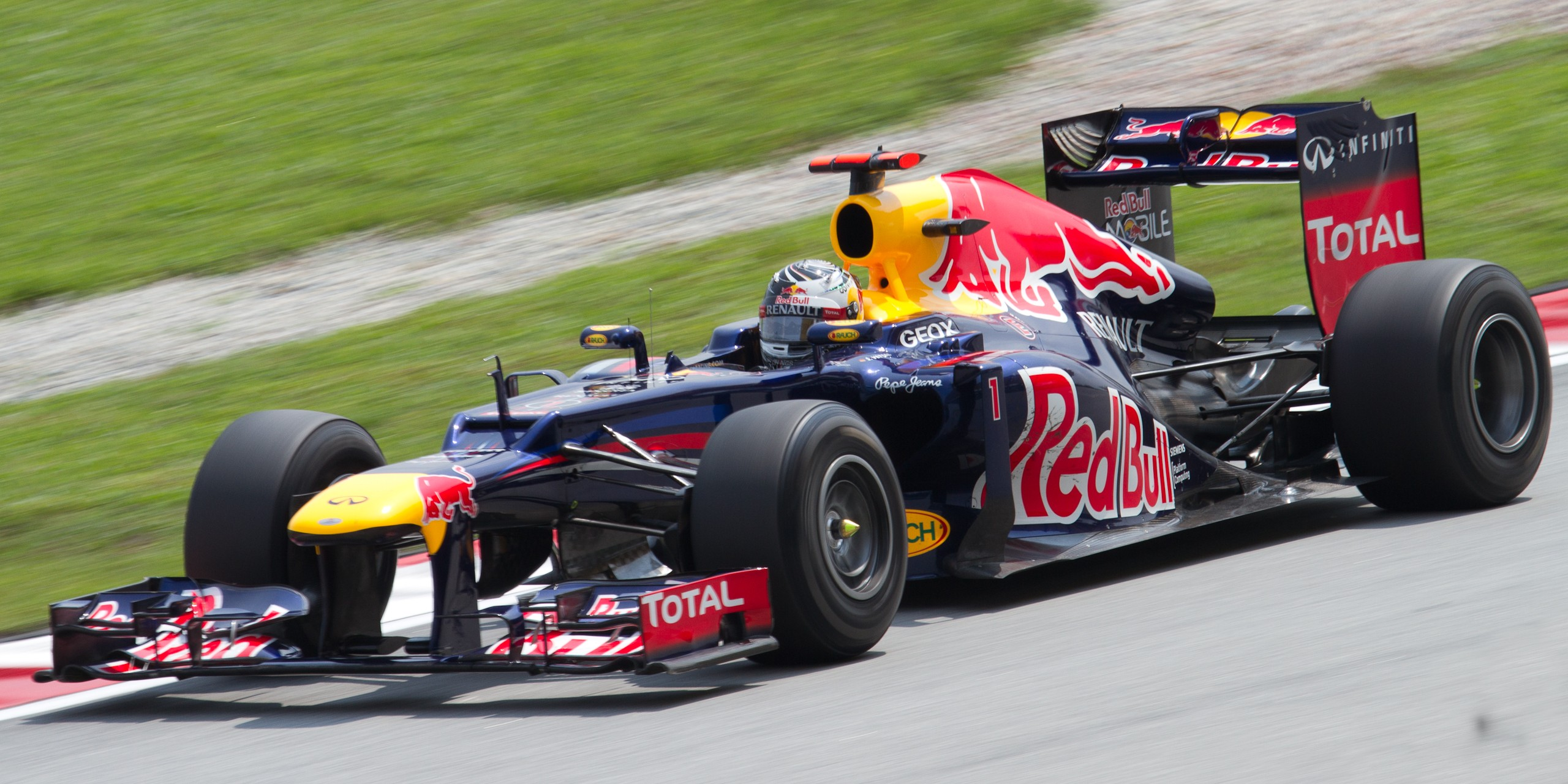
Red Bull won their third Constructors Title.

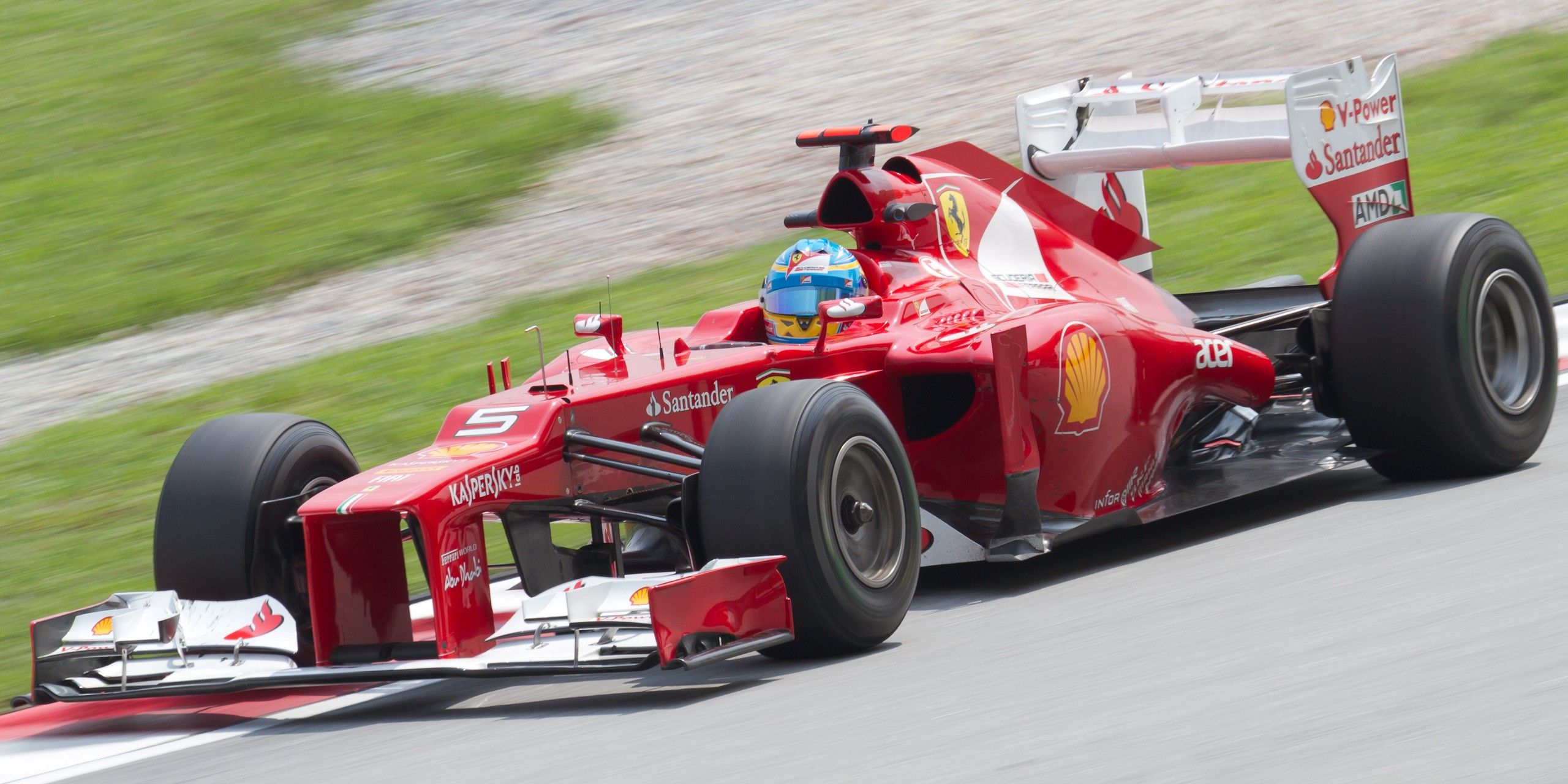
Ferrari finished second in the Constructors Standings.

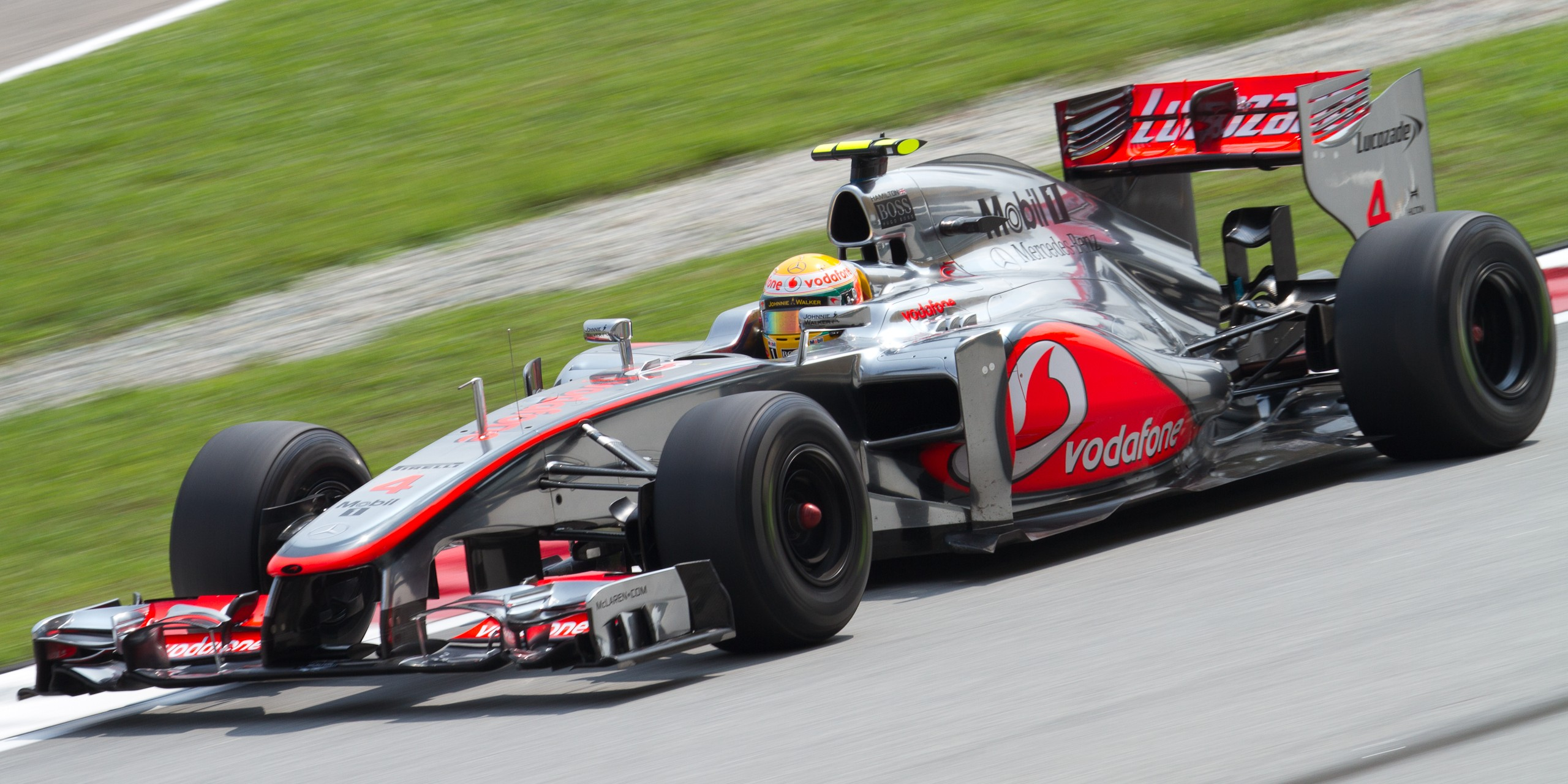
Despite having the fastest car on the grid, McLaren finished third in the Constructors as a result of many reliability issues and mechanical gremlins.

The 2012 FIA Formula One World Championship was the 66th season of FIA Formula One motor racing. It featured the 63rd FIA Formula One World Championship, a motor racing series for Formula One cars, recognised by the Fédération Internationale de l'Automobile (FIA) – the governing body of motorsport – as the highest class of competition for open-wheel racing cars. The championship was contested over twenty rounds, which started in Australia on 18 March and ended in Brazil on 25 November. The 2012 season saw the return of the United States Grand Prix, which was held at the Circuit of the Americas, a purpose-built circuit in Austin, Texas. After being cancelled in 2011 due to civil protests, the Bahrain Grand Prix also returned to the calendar.

The early season was tumultuous, with seven different drivers winning the first seven races of the championship; a record for the series. It was not until the European Grand Prix in June that a driver, Ferrari's Fernando Alonso, won his second race of the year, and with it, emerged as a championship contender. Alonso maintained his hold on the championship lead for the next seven races, taking his third win in Germany and finishing on the podium in the United Kingdom, Italy and Singapore. However, costly first-lap retirements in Belgium and Japan allowed his rivals to catch up, and defending World Champion Sebastian Vettel – like Alonso, a two-time title winner – took the lead in the sixteenth race of the season. Vettel, too, encountered difficulties throughout the season; contact with a backmarker left him to finish outside the points in Malaysia, while alternator failures at the European and Italian Grands Prix cost him valuable points and exclusion from qualifying in Abu Dhabi led him to start from the pit lane. Vettel entered the final race of the season with a thirteen-point lead over Alonso. Alonso needed a podium finish to stand any chance of becoming World Drivers' Champion, but in a race of attrition that finished under the safety car, Vettel finished in sixth place, scoring enough points to win his third consecutive championship, becoming just the third driver in the sport's sixty-three-year history to do so. In the World Constructors' Championship, Red Bull Racing secured their third consecutive title when Sebastian Vettel finished second at the United States Grand Prix.

In addition to seeing seven different drivers win the first seven races, the 2012 season broke several records. The calendar for the season included twenty races, breaking the previous record of nineteen, which was first set in 2005. Six current or former World Drivers' Champions – Sebastian Vettel, Fernando Alonso, Jenson Button, Lewis Hamilton, Kimi Räikkönen, and Michael Schumacher – started the season, breaking the record of five established in 1970.

This was the last season for 7-time world champion, Michael Schumacher as he announced his retirement from Formula One for the second time, after the 2012 Brazilian Grand Prix.

== Teams and drivers ==
The following twelve teams and twenty-five race drivers competed in the 2012 Formula One World Championship. The FIA published a provisional entry list on 30 November 2011, and the grid was finalised on 17 February. All teams competed with tyres supplied by Pirelli.

Entrant	Constructor	Chassis	Engine	No.	Race Drivers	Rounds
(Austria) Red Bull Racing Renault	Red Bull-Renault	RB8	Renault RS27-2012	1	(Germany) Sebastian Vettel	All
(Austria) Red Bull Racing Renault	Red Bull-Renault	RB8	Renault RS27-2012	2	(Australia) Mark Webber	All
(United Kingdom) Vodafone McLaren Mercedes	McLaren-Mercedes	MP4-27	Mercedes FO 108Z	3	(United Kingdom) Jenson Button	All
(United Kingdom) Vodafone McLaren Mercedes	McLaren-Mercedes	MP4-27	Mercedes FO 108Z	4	(United Kingdom) Lewis Hamilton	All
(Italy) Scuderia Ferrari	Ferrari	F2012	Ferrari Type 056	5	(Spain) Fernando Alonso	All
(Italy) Scuderia Ferrari	Ferrari	F2012	Ferrari Type 056	6	(Brazil) Felipe Massa	All
(Germany) Mercedes AMG Petronas F1 Team	Mercedes	F1 W03	Mercedes FO 108Z	7	(Germany) Michael Schumacher	All
(Germany) Mercedes AMG Petronas F1 Team	Mercedes	F1 W03	Mercedes FO 108Z	8	(Germany) Nico Rosberg	All
(United Kingdom) Lotus F1 Team	Lotus-Renault	E20	Renault RS27-2012	9	(Finland) Kimi Räikkönen	All
(United Kingdom) Lotus F1 Team	Lotus-Renault	E20	Renault RS27-2012	10	(France) Romain Grosjean	1–12, 14–20
(United Kingdom) Lotus F1 Team	Lotus-Renault	E20	Renault RS27-2012	10	(Belgium) Jérôme d'Ambrosio	13
Sahara Force India F1 Team	Force India-Mercedes	VJM05	Mercedes FO 108Z	11	(United Kingdom) Paul di Resta	All
Sahara Force India F1 Team	Force India-Mercedes	VJM05	Mercedes FO 108Z	12	(Germany) Nico Hülkenberg	All
(Switzerland) Sauber F1 Team	Sauber-Ferrari	C31	Ferrari Type 056	14	(Japan) Kamui Kobayashi	All
(Switzerland) Sauber F1 Team	Sauber-Ferrari	C31	Ferrari Type 056	15	(Mexico) Sergio Pérez	All
(Italy) Scuderia Toro Rosso	Toro Rosso-Ferrari	STR7	Ferrari Type 056	16	(Australia) Daniel Ricciardo	All
(Italy) Scuderia Toro Rosso	Toro Rosso-Ferrari	STR7	Ferrari Type 056	17	(France) Jean-Éric Vergne	All
(United Kingdom) Williams F1 Team	Williams-Renault	FW34	Renault RS27-2012	18	(Venezuela) Pastor Maldonado	All
(United Kingdom) Williams F1 Team	Williams-Renault	FW34	Renault RS27-2012	19	(Brazil) Bruno Senna	All
(Malaysia) Caterham F1 Team	Caterham-Renault	CT01	Renault RS27-2012	20	(Finland) Heikki Kovalainen	All
(Malaysia) Caterham F1 Team	Caterham-Renault	CT01	Renault RS27-2012	21	(Russia) Vitaly Petrov	All
(Spain) HRT Formula 1 Team	HRT-Cosworth	F112	Cosworth CA2012	22	(Spain) Pedro de la Rosa	All
(Spain) HRT Formula 1 Team	HRT-Cosworth	F112	Cosworth CA2012	23	(India) Narain Karthikeyan	All
(Russia) Marussia F1 Team	Marussia-Cosworth	MR01	Cosworth CA2012	24	(Germany) Timo Glock	All
(Russia) Marussia F1 Team	Marussia-Cosworth	MR01	Cosworth CA2012	25	(France) Charles Pic	All

=== Free practice drivers ===
Eight drivers were entered by teams as third or test drivers during Friday practice sessions:

Drivers who took part in free practice sessions during the 2012 FIA Formula One World Championship
Constructor	Practice drivers	
Constructor	Driver name	Rounds
Caterham-Renault	(Netherlands) Giedo van der Garde (United States) Alexander Rossi	3, 15–18, 20; 5
Force India-Mercedes	(France) Jules Bianchi	3, 5, 8–11, 13, 16, 18
Hispania-Cosworth	(Spain) Dani Clos (China) Ma Qinghua	5, 9–12, 16; 13–14, 18–19
Marussia-Cosworth	(United Kingdom) Max Chilton	18
Sauber-Ferrari	(Mexico) Esteban Gutiérrez	17
Williams-Renault	(Finland) Valtteri Bottas	2–5, 8–13, 15–18, 20

=== Team changes ===
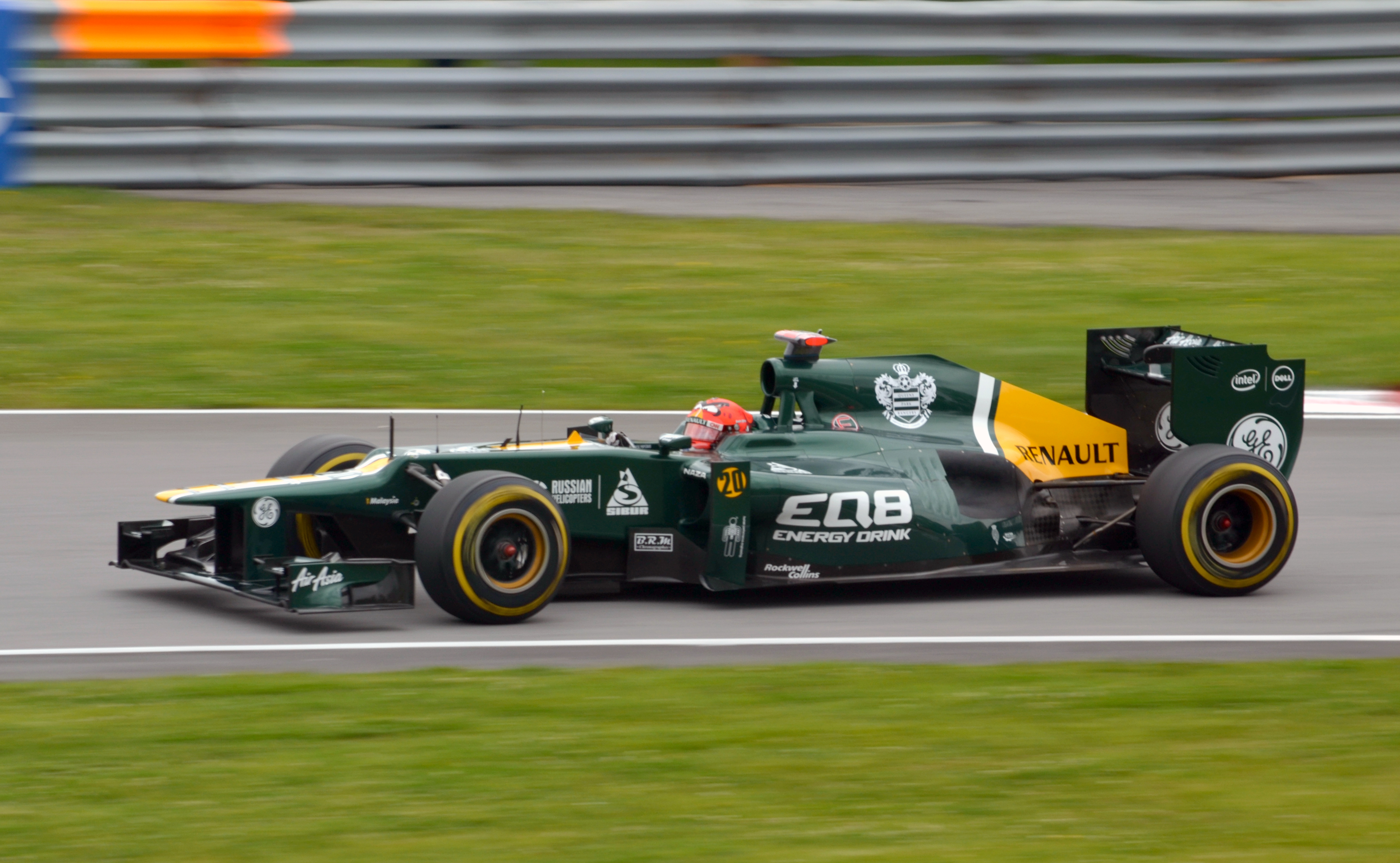
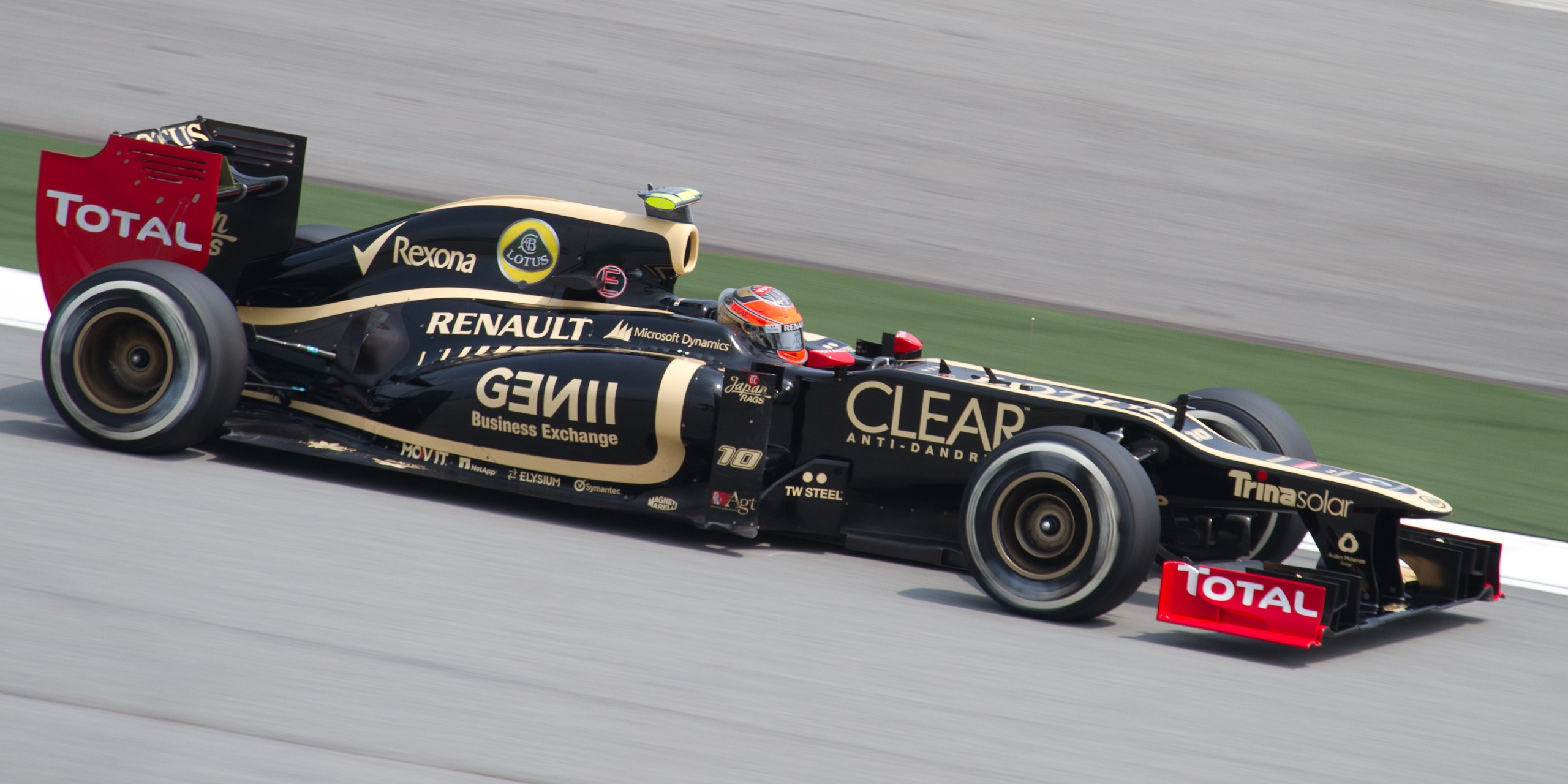

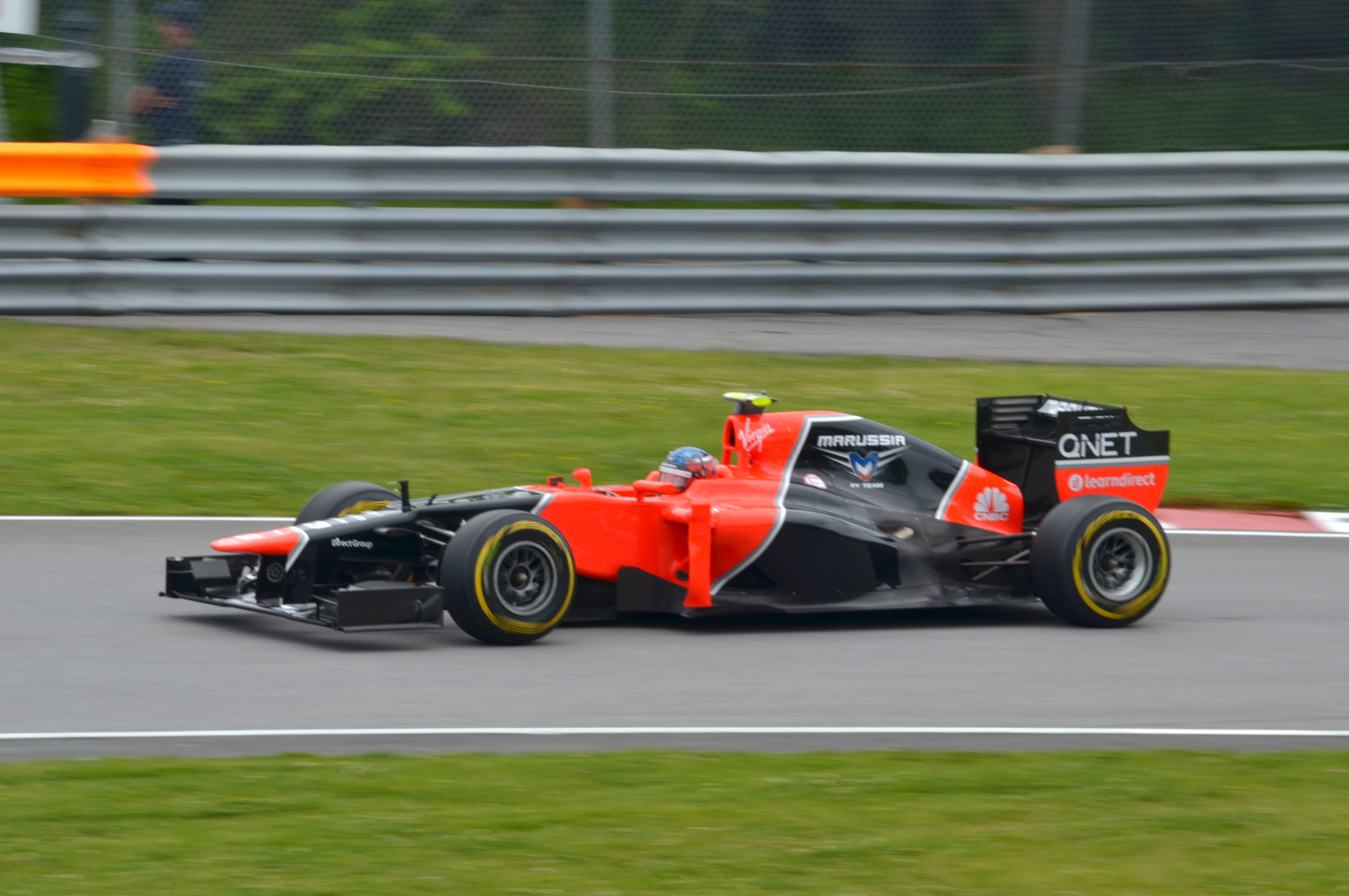
Three teams changed their names for 2012: Team Lotus became known as Caterham (top); Renault was renamed as Lotus (middle); and Virgin Racing changed its name to Marussia (bottom).

At the November 2011 meeting of the Formula One Commission in Geneva, several teams were given permission to change their constructor names – the name recognised by the FIA as the entity that effectively owns the team, and to which all results for that team are credited – with final approval from the World Motor Sport Council granted in December of that year:

- Lotus became known as Caterham, reflecting team principal Tony Fernandes's purchase of Caterham Cars.
- Renault changed its constructor name to Lotus after Lotus Cars expanded its title sponsorship program to include teams in Formula One and support series GP2 and GP3.
- Virgin became Marussia, following increased ownership of the team by Russian sports car manufacturer Marussia Motors.

As a result of the name changes, Team Lotus and Lotus Renault GP declared that their ongoing dispute over the use of the Lotus name was over after they had reached an "amicable conclusion". Although the exact terms of the settlement were kept confidential, the joint statement detailed the transfer of the rights to the Lotus and Team Lotus names to Group Lotus's ownership.

Williams announced that they would be using Renault engines for the 2012 and 2013 seasons, with an option to use Renault engines again in 2014 under the next generation of engine regulations. Renault had previously supplied engines to Williams from 1989 to 1997, when the team won four World Drivers' Championships and five World Constructors' Championships. Following their worst season in their thirty-year history – in which they finished ninth in the World Constructors' Championship with just five points – the team underwent a technical review, employing former McLaren designer Mike Coughlan (having served his suspension for his role in the 2007 Formula One espionage controversy) as Chief Designer, and promoting Jason Somerville to Head of Aerodynamics. Likewise, Marussia (then known as Virgin Racing) underwent a restructuring, splitting with Wirth Research mid-season after a technical review by Marussia Motors and the board of directors. The team also announced a technical partnership with McLaren that granted them access to McLaren's testing facilities as well as the purchase of Wirth Research facilities.

In the week before the 2011 Indian Grand Prix, Force India announced that the Sahara Group had purchased a 42.5% stake in the team, valued at US$100 million. The investment gave the Sahara Group and team principal Vijay Mallya an equal stake in the team, with team director Michiel Mol controlling the remaining 15% of the team. Under the terms of the sale, the Sahara Group became Force India's naming-rights sponsor. Mercedes GP also changed the name of their team, announcing that they were to become known as Mercedes AMG. The new name originates from AMG, Mercedes-Benz's performance and luxury road car brand.

HRT team principal Colin Kolles formally left his position, with the team citing the relocation of their headquarters to Spain as the reason for the separation. Former Minardi driver Luis Pérez-Sala took Kolles's place as team principal. In January 2012, the team relocated to a new facility in Valencia before settling at a permanent facility in Caja Mágica, Madrid.

Peter Sauber formally stepped down from his position as team principal of Sauber F1 in the week before the Korean Grand Prix, appointing the team's CEO, Monisha Kaltenborn as his successor. Kaltenborn's appointment made her the first female team principal in the sport's sixty-three-year history.

=== Driver changes ===
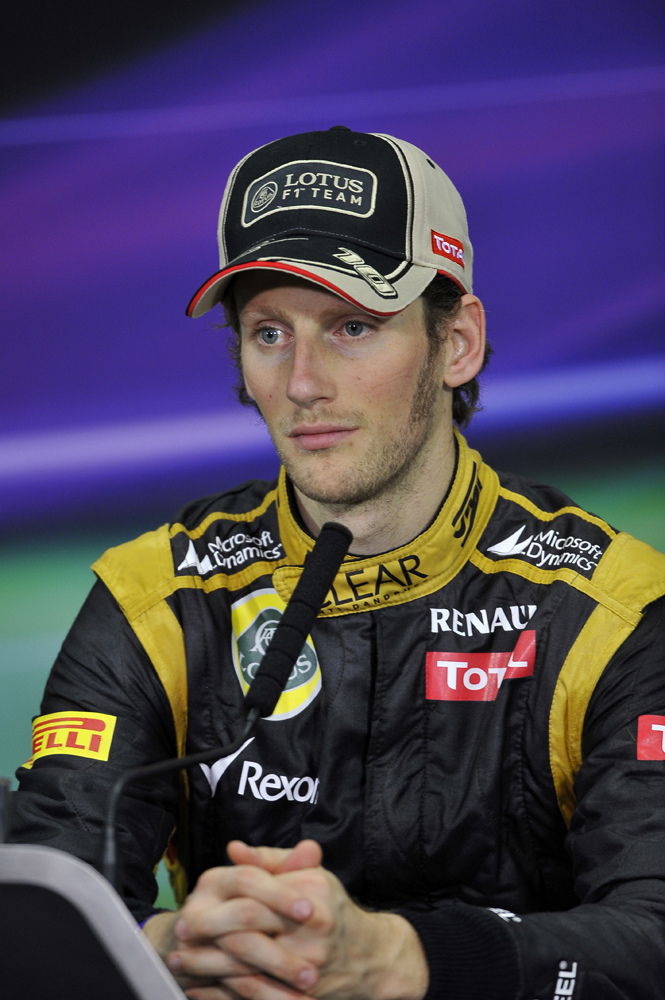
Romain Grosjean returned to Formula One with Lotus, the same team – then known as Renault F1 – with whom he made his debut in 2009.

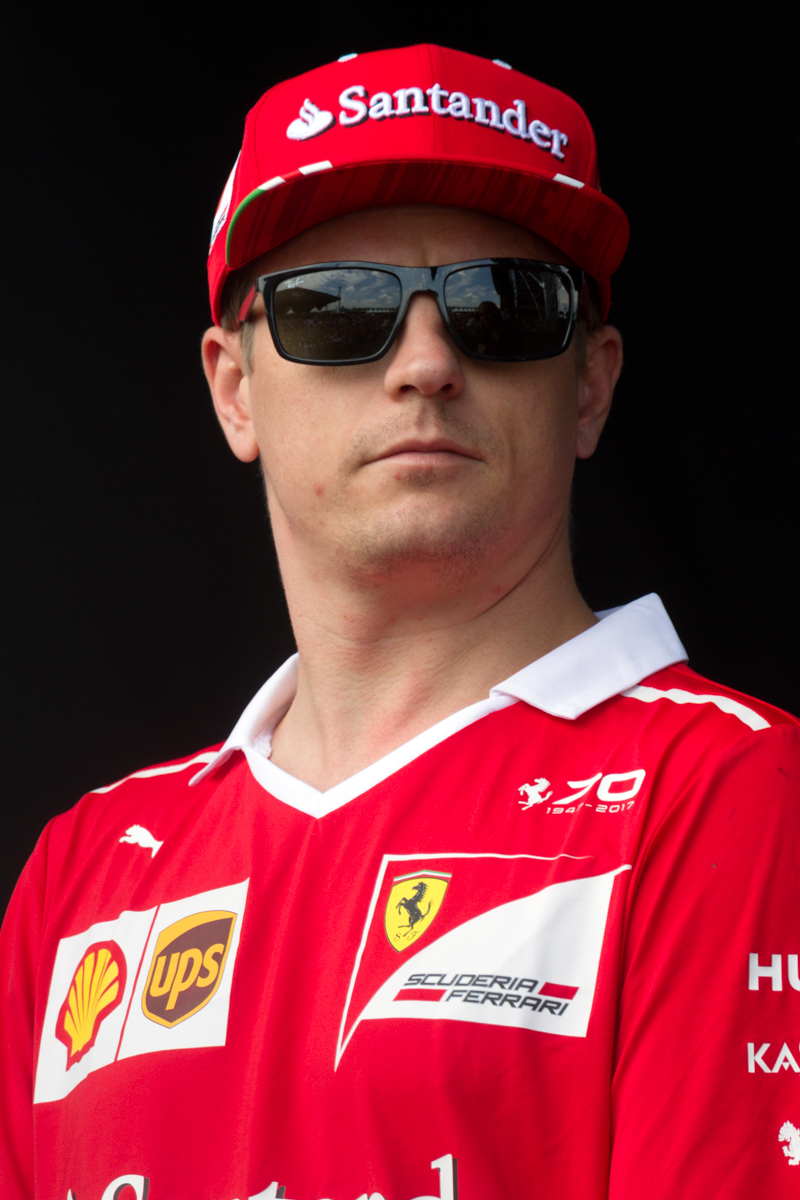
Kimi Räikkönen (pictured in 2017) returned to Formula One with Lotus after two years in rallying.

The 2012 season saw several driver changes. Lotus chose not to take up an option on Vitaly Petrov's contract, and did not offer Bruno Senna a new contract. Petrov and Senna were replaced by 2007 World Drivers' Champion Kimi Räikkönen – returning to the sport after two seasons competing in the World Rally Championship – and reigning GP2 Series champion Romain Grosjean, who also returned to the sport after a two-year absence. Petrov later replaced Jarno Trulli at Caterham; Trulli's replacement meant that the opening race of the season would be the first race since the 1973 German Grand Prix to take place without an Italian driver on the grid. Senna joined Williams, the team having previously attempted to secure Räikkönen for the season. Senna replaced Rubens Barrichello, who left Formula One after a record-breaking nineteen seasons. He later moved to IndyCar for the 2012 season, joining KV Racing Technology.

Like Räikkönen and Grosjean, Nico Hülkenberg also returned to Formula One, joining Force India alongside Paul di Resta. Adrian Sutil left the team, having spent six years with both Force India and its previous incarnations, Spyker and Midland. He initially sought a drive with Williams, before negotiations collapsed in December 2011. Sutil was later the subject of criminal action, charged with grievous bodily harm after allegedly assaulting a senior Renault team member with a glass in a Shanghai nightclub following the 2011 Chinese Grand Prix. Sutil was found guilty, and was sentenced to an eighteen-month suspended jail sentence and ordered to pay a €200,000 fine. Despite this, Sutil rejoined Force India for the 2013 season.

Scuderia Toro Rosso did not retain Jaime Alguersuari or Sébastien Buemi, instead choosing to replace them with Daniel Ricciardo and 2011 Formula Renault 3.5 Series runner-up Jean-Éric Vergne. Ricciardo had previously served as the team's test and reserve driver before being placed at HRT for the 2011 British Grand Prix, while Vergne had completed a limited testing schedule for the team in the second half of the 2011 season. Sébastien Buemi became Red Bull Racing's testing and reserve driver contested the 24 Hours of Le Mans with Toyota, driving a TS030 Hybrid. Alguersuari was offered a seat at HRT, but turned it down and instead joined tyre supplier Pirelli as their test driver, developing tyre compounds for use in racing alongside former Virgin Racing driver Lucas di Grassi.

Pedro de la Rosa and Narain Karthikeyan returned to Formula One with HRT. De la Rosa had been without a full-time drive since the 2010 Italian Grand Prix, having spent the majority of the 2011 season as a test driver for McLaren and making one appearance racing for Sauber; Karthikeyan was dropped by the team before the 2011 British Grand Prix in favour of Ricciardo. He, too, made a one-race appearance at the Indian Grand Prix, before leaving the team until the 2012 season began. Vitantonio Liuzzi, who drove for HRT in 2011, joined the Indian i1 Super Series. The series was later postponed until 2013, but Liuzzi was unable to retain his seat with the team. At the launch of the HRT F112 in March, Liuzzi was confirmed as one of the team's testing and reserve drivers alongside both former GP2 Series driver Dani Clos and Ma Qinghua, the first ever Chinese driver to step into a Formula 1 car.

Jérôme d'Ambrosio left Marussia (then known as Virgin Racing) after the 2011 Brazilian Grand Prix. He later joined Lotus F1 as their third driver. Charles Pic – who placed fourth in the 2011 GP2 Series driving for Addax – joined Marussia, replacing d'Ambrosio.

==== Mid-season changes ====
The season only saw one driver change, which was brought about when Lotus driver Romain Grosjean was found by race stewards to be responsible for causing a multi-car pile-up at the start of the Belgian Grand Prix. He was given a one-race ban and a €50,000 fine for his role in the collision, forcing him to miss the Italian Grand Prix. He was replaced by the team's testing and reserve driver, Jérôme d'Ambrosio. Grosjean returned to the team for the next round in Singapore.

== Calendar ==
Nations hosting Formula One Grands Prix in 2012.

Round	Grand Prix	Circuit	Date
1	Australian Grand Prix	(Australia) Albert Park Circuit, Melbourne	18 March
2	Malaysian Grand Prix	(Malaysia) Sepang International Circuit, Kuala Lumpur	25 March
3	Chinese Grand Prix	(China) Shanghai International Circuit, Shanghai	15 April
4	Bahrain Grand Prix	Bahrain International Circuit, Sakhir	22 April
5	Spanish Grand Prix	(Spain) Circuit de Catalunya, Montmeló	13 May
6	Monaco Grand Prix	Circuit de Monaco, Monte Carlo	27 May
7	Canadian Grand Prix	(Canada) Circuit Gilles Villeneuve, Montreal	10 June
8	European Grand Prix	(Spain) Valencia Street Circuit, Valencia	24 June
9	British Grand Prix	(United Kingdom) Silverstone Circuit, Silverstone	8 July
10	German Grand Prix	(Germany) Hockenheimring, Hockenheim	22 July
11	Hungarian Grand Prix	(Hungary) Hungaroring, Mogyoród	29 July
12	Belgian Grand Prix	(Belgium) Circuit de Spa-Francorchamps, Stavelot	2 September
13	Italian Grand Prix	(Italy) Autodromo Nazionale Monza, Monza	9 September
14	Singapore Grand Prix	Marina Bay Street Circuit, Singapore	23 September
15	Japanese Grand Prix	(Japan) Suzuka Circuit, Suzuka	7 October
16	Korean Grand Prix	(South Korea) Korea International Circuit, Yeongam	14 October
17	Indian Grand Prix	(India) Buddh International Circuit, Greater Noida	28 October
18	Abu Dhabi Grand Prix	(United Arab Emirates) Yas Marina Circuit, Abu Dhabi	4 November
19	United States Grand Prix	(United States) Circuit of the Americas, Austin, Texas	18 November
20	Brazilian Grand Prix	(Brazil) Autódromo José Carlos Pace, São Paulo	25 November

=== Calendar changes ===
Formula One returned to the United States in 2012, with the race held at the Circuit of the Americas near Austin, Texas.

==== New and returning races ====
- After the 2011 Bahrain Grand Prix was cancelled, the race was reinstated for the 2012 season with a provisional date in October. The final version of the calendar brought the race forward to April.
- The German Grand Prix returned to Hockenheim after the 2011 German Grand Prix was held at the Nürburgring, in line with the event's policy of alternating between venues.
- In May 2010, it was announced that Austin, Texas would host the return of the United States Grand Prix, the first since Indianapolis in 2007. Known as the Circuit of the Americas, the venue will be a brand-new, purpose-built permanent circuit designed by event promoter Tavo Hellmund and 1993 Grand Prix Motorcycle World Champion Kevin Schwantz with the assistance of German architect and circuit designer Hermann Tilke. In November 2011, Bernie Ecclestone expressed "minor" doubt over the race going ahead after what he described as "disagreements inside the [management] company" and gave the circuit owners and race organisers a deadline of 7 December – coinciding with the meeting of the FIA World Motor Sport Council and the release of the final 2012 calendar – to sort out their differences or else risk losing the event entirely. The final calendar included the race, with Ecclestone confirming that a new arrangement had been made, and that the event organisers had paid their circuit sanctioning fees for 2012. The race was originally scheduled to be held in June, but was moved back to become the penultimate event of the season in response to concerns over the heat of the Texas summer and its effects on teams, drivers and spectators, and the failure of race organisers to meet a key deadline for the race sanctioning fees.

==== Failed races ====
- The Turkish Grand Prix was firstly included in the provisional calendar, but then it was removed from the calendar after Formula One Management and the event organisers could not agree on a renewed contract. In August 2011, organisers of the race revealed that they were negotiating with Bernie Ecclestone to resume their place on the calendar. However, the race was removed from the calendar later that month. It would eventually return in 2020 due to the COVID-19 pandemic.

== Changes ==
=== Rule changes ===
==== Technical regulations ====
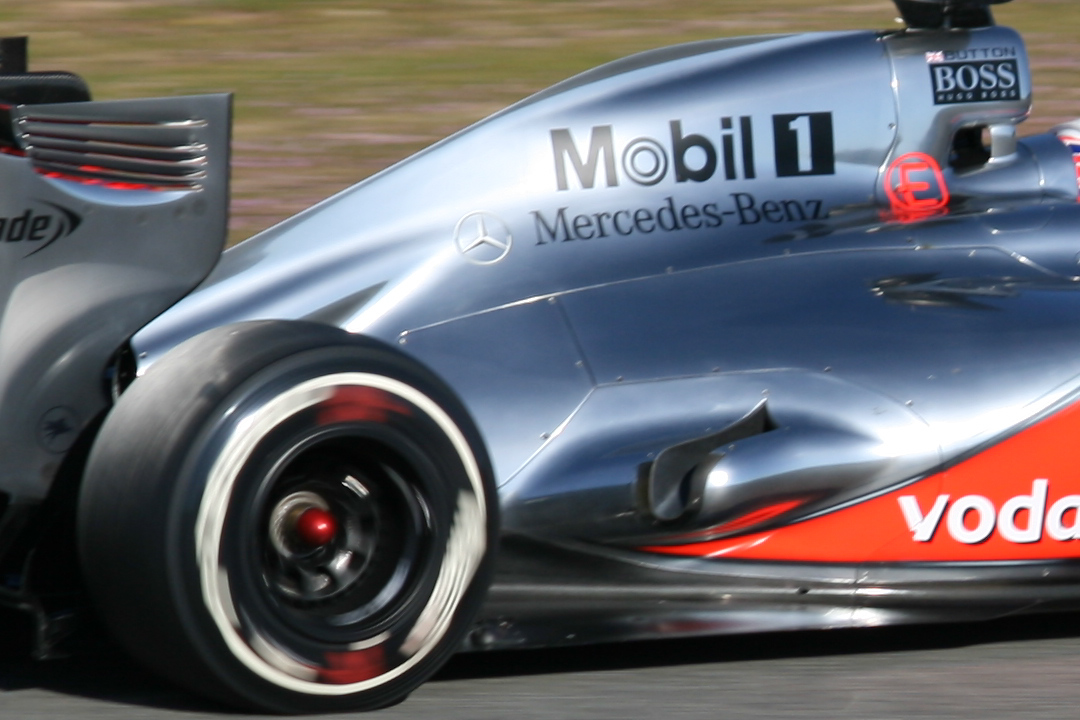
The banning of exhaust-blown diffusers meant all teams had to redevelop the exit of the exhaust.

- The 2011 season saw teams running "off-throttle blown diffusers", which created downforce by forcing fuel through the engine to produce exhaust gases and directing it over the diffuser when the driver was not applying the throttle. This concept was originally banned in incremental phases, with increasingly restrictive rules on what teams could and could not do, with a full ban to be applied from the 2011 British Grand Prix onwards. However, the incremental ban was controversial, with several teams applying for and receiving permission to circumvent the total ban. After discussion between the FIA and engine manufacturers, the original regulations were restored, with the full ban delayed until 2012. The regulations in 2012 governed the design of the exhaust with the teams agreeing to strict constraints on the position of the exhaust tailpipe. This resulted in the exhaust exiting the bodywork much higher up than in 2011, and no longer in the vicinity of the diffuser. Several teams, including Williams and Mercedes used the Young Driver Tests in Abu Dhabi as an opportunity to test parts for the 2012 season in the face of the ban. In October 2011, a clarification to the amended rules was issued, effectively banning "exotic" engine maps; in November, further amendments were introduced, completely banning the practice of blowing exhaust gasses over parts of the car to improve downforce, following a bid by several teams to allow it under certain conditions. Further amendments were made in February 2012 when Mercedes alerted the FIA to a loophole in the regulations that would allow teams to continue using a partially blown diffuser. The FIA responded by re-writing the software governing the engine's Electronic Control Unit to close the loophole.
- At the German Grand Prix in July, Red Bull Racing were referred to race stewards after FIA Technical Delegate Jo Bauer noted that their engine maps had the potential to violate the technical regulations. Red Bull stood accused of manipulating the relationship between the torque produced by the Red Bull RB8 and the degree to which the throttle was open – particularly in medium-speed corners – thereby allowing more air to pass through the exhaust and over the diffuser, generating more downforce. Red Bull were cleared of wrongdoing, as, in the stewards' words, they had not technically broken any rules, but the FIA announced plans to rewrite the regulations governing throttle mapping so as to outlaw the practice entirely ahead of the Hungarian Grand Prix one week later. The rule changes required teams to submit an engine map used during one of the first four races of the season, which became known as the "reference map". Any subsequent changes to the throttle map would require the approval of the FIA, provided that the torque output above 6,000 rpm was within two percent of the output specified on the reference map. Further changes would be allowed at races with "exceptional atmospheric conditions", as designated by the FIA.
- In January 2012, the FIA banned the use of "reactive ride-height". The system, first proposed by Lotus in 2010 (but not applied until 2012), used hydraulic cylinders located in the brake calipers and suspension push-rods to make minute adjustments to the ride height of the car, thereby keeping the ride height at an optimal level throughout the race and providing stability during braking. The FIA initially approved the device as being legal, and several teams, including Ferrari and Williams, submitted plans to the FIA for their own versions of the device before it was banned one week later. The FIA later confirmed that the reactive ride-height systems violated Article 3.15 of the technical regulations, which states that "any aerodynamic effect created by the suspension should be incidental to its primary function" and "any device that influences the car's aerodynamics must remain immobile in relation to the sprung part of the car" and further noted that the system's primary purpose was achieving aerodynamic gains as opposed to providing stability under braking, and that the use of reactive ride-heights could also be challenged under Article 10.2 of the technical regulations, which govern suspension systems.

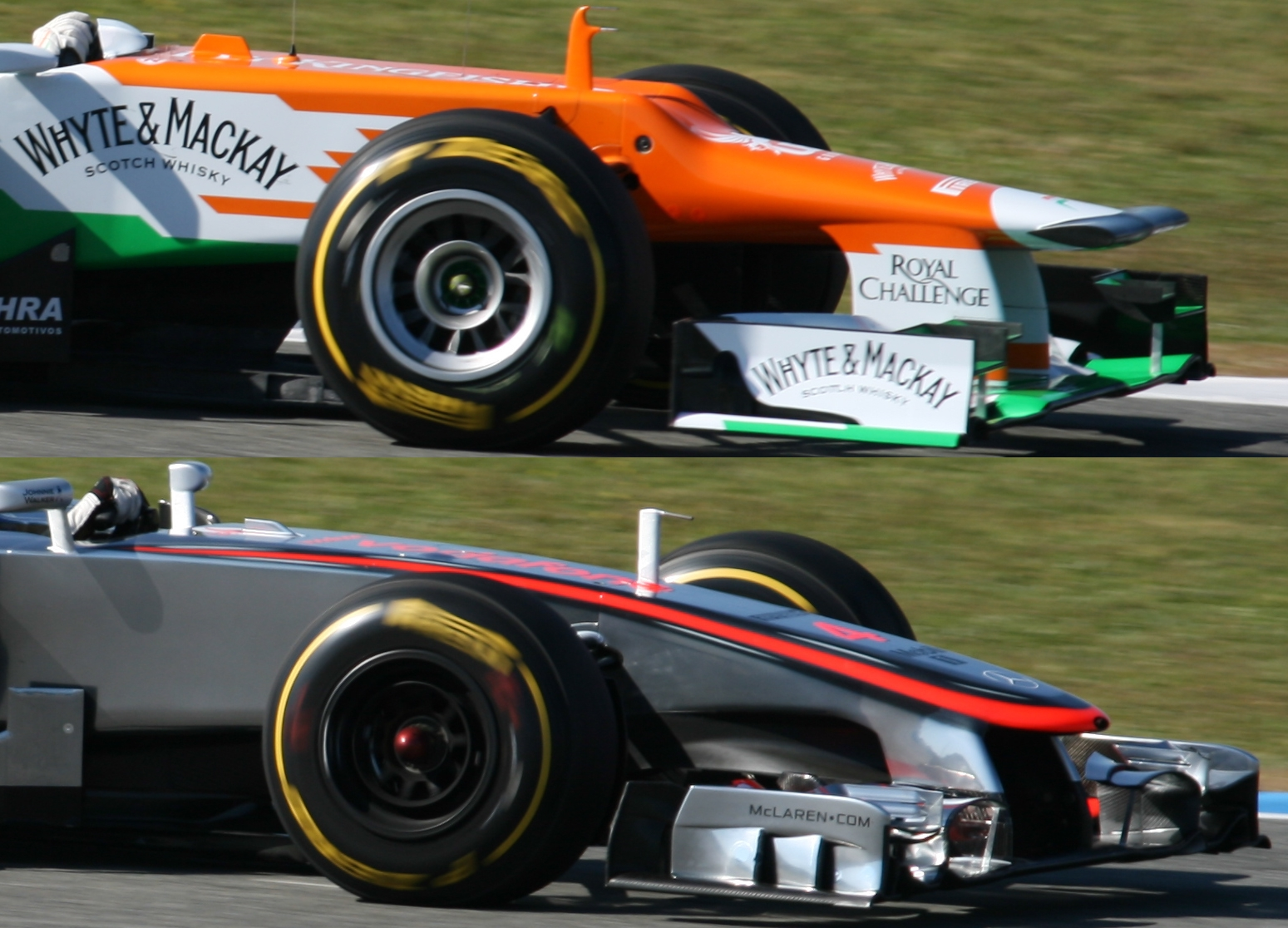
The reduction in the height of the nose led to several teams using a "platypus" nose design, as seen in the Force India VJM05 (top). However, McLaren did not use this design, as evidenced in the McLaren MP4-27 (bottom).

- Technical regulations for 2012 include the reprofiling of the car's nose. The pre-2012 regulations allowed the nose to be as high as 62.5 centimetres (24.6 in) above ground, but the revisions to the sporting code lowered the maximum allowable height to 55 centimetres (22 in) 150mm ahead of the front bulkhead. This resulted in cars being launched with a "platypus" nose, as teams designed cars with a visible change in height along the nose assembly of the car. Mercedes AMG team principal Ross Brawn explained the distinctive nose shape as having come about from "several teams" wanting to use their 2011 chassis as the basis for their 2012 cars.
- Drivers were no longer permitted to have a "joker" gearbox change. Prior to 2012, drivers were entitled to change their gearboxes once over the course of the season without incurring a five-place grid penalty. This system was abandoned in 2012, with drivers only being allowed to change gearboxes once every five races.
- Starting in 2012, all cars were required to pass their mandatory FIA crash tests before being allowed to take part in pre-season testing. Previously, passing the crash tests was only a requirement prior to the first race of the season. Crash tests for the 2012 season will also be more rigorous than in previous years.
- At the meeting for the Formula One Commission in Geneva in November 2011, the use of helium in air guns used to change tyres during pit stops was banned. Despite increasing the rotation speed of the air guns by up to 30%, the practice of using helium was deemed to be too expensive to continue for the competitive gains it offered.
- At the 2012 Abu Dhabi Grand Prix, the FIA banned the use of "trick brake" devices, which used a bi-metallic strip that changed shape when heated by the brakes to open or close off braking ducts and improving braking efficiency under certain conditions. This was deemed to be in breach of Article 11.4 of the Sporting Regulations, which states that the only permissible changes to the braking system while a car is moving must be directly controlled by the driver.

==== Sporting regulations ====
- After being banned in 2009, in-season testing returned in 2012, with a test held at Mugello on 1 May ahead of the European leg of the 2012 championship. As teams were only permitted to do fifteen days of testing over the course of the season, the pre-season winter testing schedule was cut back to accommodate the Mugello test.
- At the September 2011 meeting of the FIA World Motor Sport Council, representatives of the member organisations voted to amend the rules for double-waved yellow flags in all FIA-sanctioned championships. The amendment means that double-waved flags will be shown when a track marshal is working on or beside the circuit.
- Tyre supplier Pirelli revised their tyre compounds for the 2012 season in an effort to encourage teams to use each of the compounds supplied for individual races. Pirelli predicted that the changes would translate into 0.7 seconds' difference per lap between the harder and softer compounds, down from 1.5 seconds per lap in 2011. According to Pirelli, the hardest tyre compound available is just 31% harder than the softest compound on offer; by comparison, the hardest tyres used in 2011 were 70% harder than the softest.
- Faced with several constructors applying for name changes, teams requested a clearer definition of what constitutes a "constructor". Under the rules set out in the Sixth Concorde Agreement, several teams have been forced to compete under names that do not necessarily reflect their ownership—such as Sauber competing as "BMW Sauber" in 2010, despite BMW withdrawing from the sport at the end of the 2009 season—in order to preserve their status as a current constructor and their claim to a share of the television rights paid to teams that placed in the top ten in the final World Constructors' Championship standings.
- At the final meeting of the World Motorsports Commission in December 2011, a series of amendments to the sporting regulations were published. Chief among these is the re-introduction of a rule that will allow all lapped traffic under the safety car (which remained the Mercedes-Benz SLS AMG introduced in 2010) to be released from the queue before the car returns to pit lane, allowing the drivers to unlap themselves and to ensure a clean restart.
- Drivers were not permitted to leave the confines of the circuit without a justifiable reason, following a spate of incidents in 2011 when drivers were sighted using access roads around the circuit to shorten their reconnaissance and in-laps in order to preserve their fuel and tyres. Similarly, drivers will not be allowed to return to the normal racing line should they choose a defensive line going into a corner.
- Races were run to a maximum four-hour time limit to prevent the indefinite suspension of a race. This will stop the theoretical possibility of a race lasting more than eight hours. This rule was introduced in response to the rain-interrupted 2011 Canadian Grand Prix, which set a record for the longest race in Formula One history, at four hours, four minutes and thirty-nine seconds.
- Any driver in the pit lane when a race is suspended was permitted to return to the circuit and take up the position on the grid that they were running in at the time of the suspension.
- At the 2012 British Grand Prix in July, the FIA disabled the use of the Drag Reduction System (DRS) during a race while yellow flags were being shown in the same sector as the DRS zone. The move followed an incident at the European Grand Prix in which Michael Schumacher was observed to activate his DRS while yellow flags were being shown.

=== Other changes ===
- In July 2011, a joint broadcasting deal for Formula One in the United Kingdom was announced between Sky Sports and the BBC. The announcement was controversial, being met with highly negative reactions from fans and observers as it had previously been believed that the terms of the Concorde Agreement prevented Formula One from being broadcast exclusively on pay-per-view, but the Agreement did not prevent a shared broadcast such as the proposal made by Sky Sports and the BBC. The controversial nature of the broadcast deal led to the Culture, Media and Sport Committee of the House of Commons calling Bernie Ecclestone and "senior BBC figures" including director-general Mark Thompson to answer questions over the details of the broadcasting arrangement.
- In December 2011, Red Bull Racing and Scuderia Ferrari exited FOTA, the Formula One Teams Association, following prolonged debate over the implementation of the controversial Resource Restriction Agreement, though Red Bull team principal Christian Horner reaffirmed his team's commitment to cost-cutting measures and highlighting the team's concerns over certain loopholes in the Resource Restriction Agreement that they felt teams and manufacturers would willingly exploit. One week later, Sauber also left the organisation, though the Swiss team did not publicly give a reason for ending their membership. In February 2012, Red Bull Racing's sister team Scuderia Toro Rosso was also reported as having left the organisation since the first schism in December.

== Race summaries ==
=== Pre-season testing – Jerez de la Frontera and Barcelona ===
The 2012 season was preceded by three test sessions; one at Jerez de la Frontera and two in Barcelona. These sessions gave the teams and drivers the opportunity to familiarise themselves with their cars, though the teams downplayed the accuracy of testing times as being representative of the running order for the season. At the second test in Barcelona, Lotus F1 discovered a critical fault in the build of their chassis that forced them to miss four days of running, while both HRT and Marussia were unable to complete any mileage with their 2012 cars after both the HRT F112 and Marussia MR01 failed their crash tests, though both teams were able to complete shakedowns of their cars.

"We are all terrified that somebody will unlock the secret and win everything. Unless, of course, that's us!"

— 2009 World Drivers' Champion Jenson Button on the competitive nature of the 2012 season.

=== Round 1 – Australia Albert Park Circuit ===
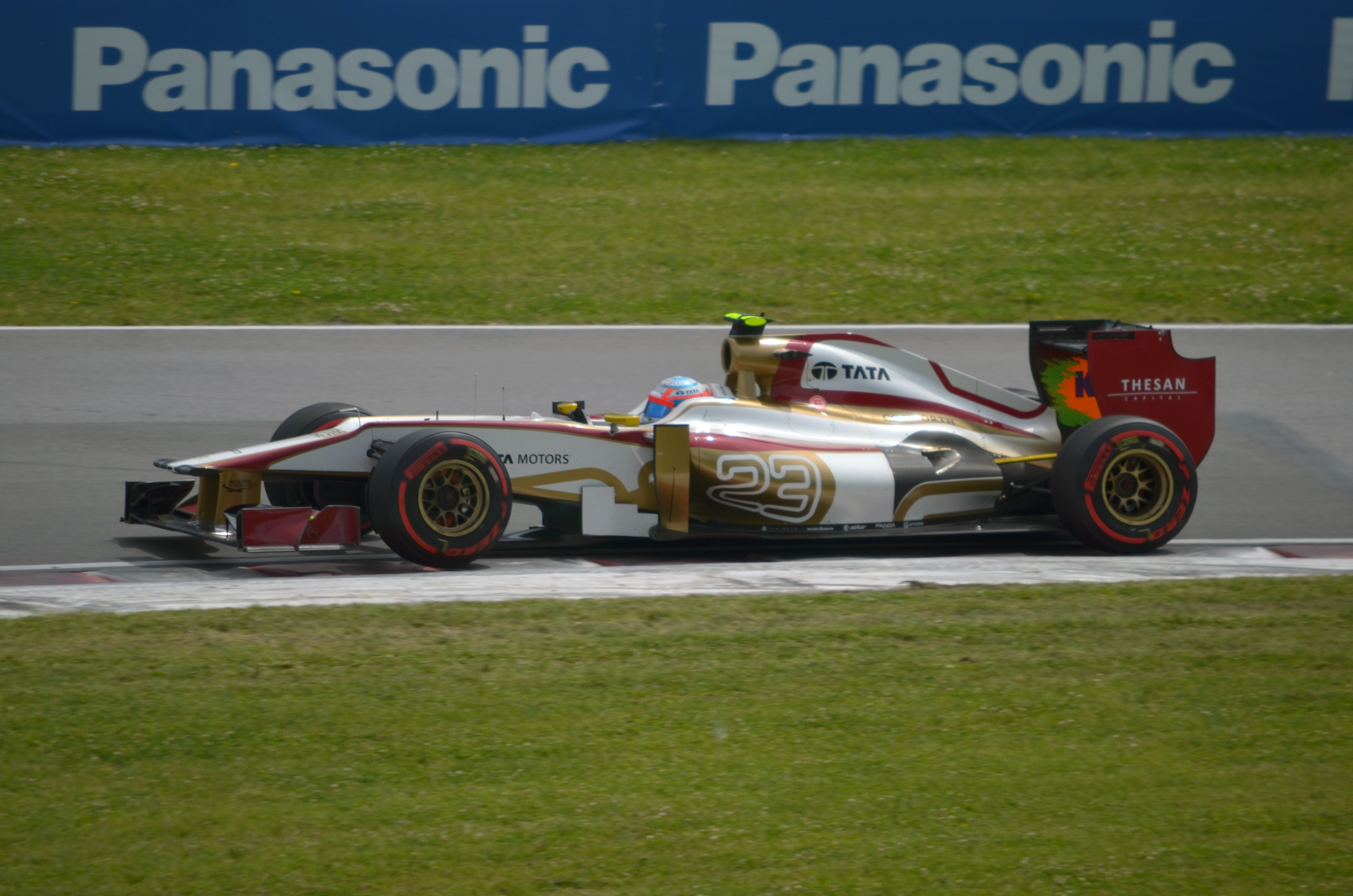
HRT failed to qualify for the Australian Grand Prix for the second consecutive year.

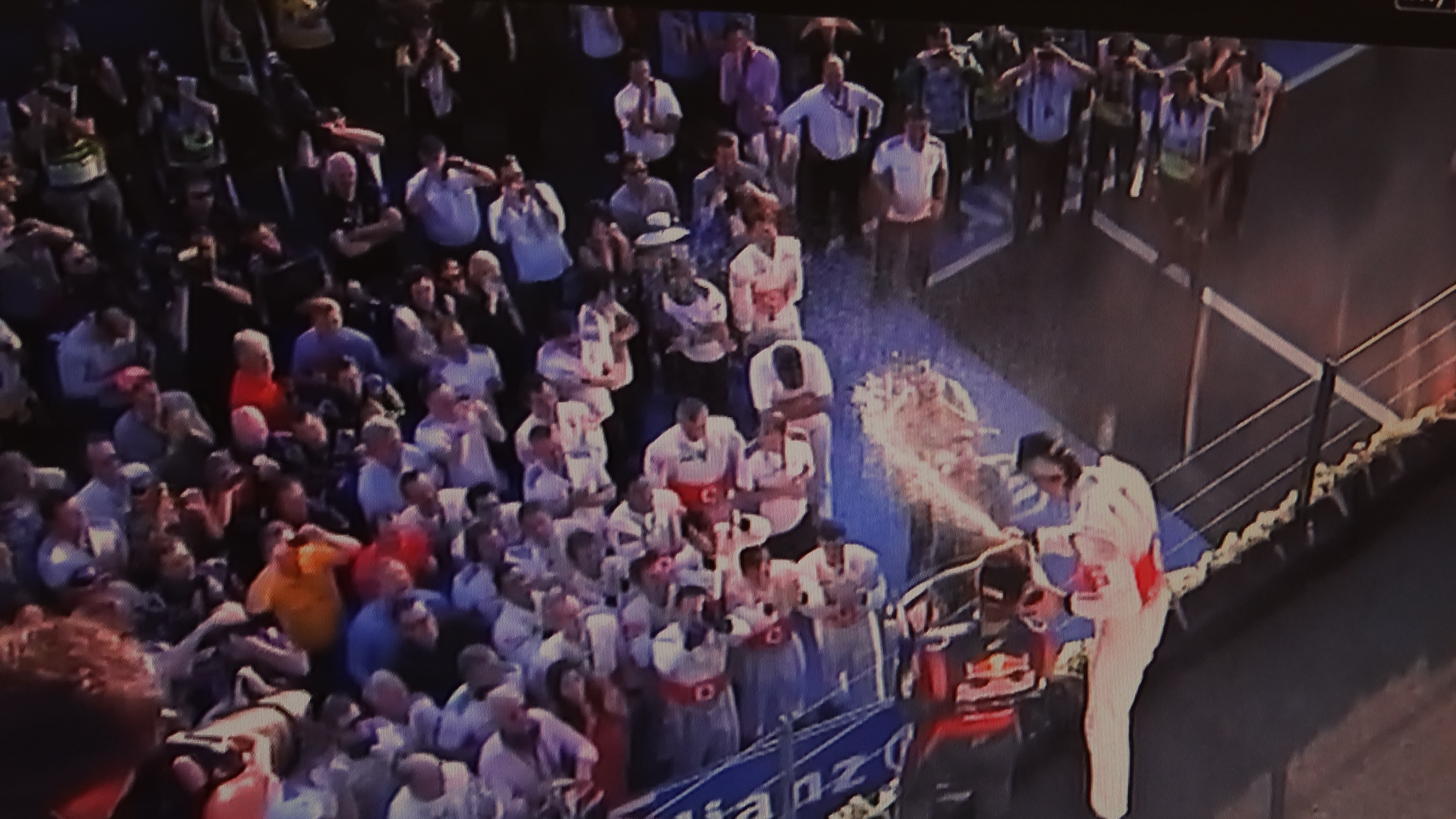
Jenson Button (on the podium) won the first race of the season. He never led the championship again for the rest of the season.

The season began in Australia. Jenson Button took an early lead from pole-sitter Lewis Hamilton and the Red Bull cars while the rest of the field was bottle-necked by contact in the first corner. Button remained unchallenged throughout, even after a mid-race safety car to retrieve the stricken Caterham of Vitaly Petrov. Button went on to take his third victory at the Melbourne circuit, ahead of Sebastian Vettel, who profited from the safety car to pass Hamilton. McLaren team principal Martin Whitmarsh later admitted that Button was "more than marginal" on fuel after the team made a mistake in calculating their fuel loads for the race, forcing Button to use a "severe fuel-saving mode" from the eighth lap of the race. Hamilton came under threat from Mark Webber in the late stages of the race, but held on to secure third place. Webber finished fourth – his best result in his home Grand Prix – while Fernando Alonso finished fifth, having endured pressure from Pastor Maldonado for the last half of the race. Maldonado's race ended when he crossed onto the astroturf on the final lap and spun into the wall. Kimi Räikkönen finished seventh after a poor qualifying session saw him start the race seventeenth, taking advantage of a chaotic final lap to make up two places, while Felipe Massa and Bruno Senna both retired after a bizarre collision that saw their cars tangled up in one another. HRT failed to qualify for the race for the second consecutive season after drivers Pedro de la Rosa and Narain Karthikeyan failed to set a lap time within 107% of the fastest qualifying time.

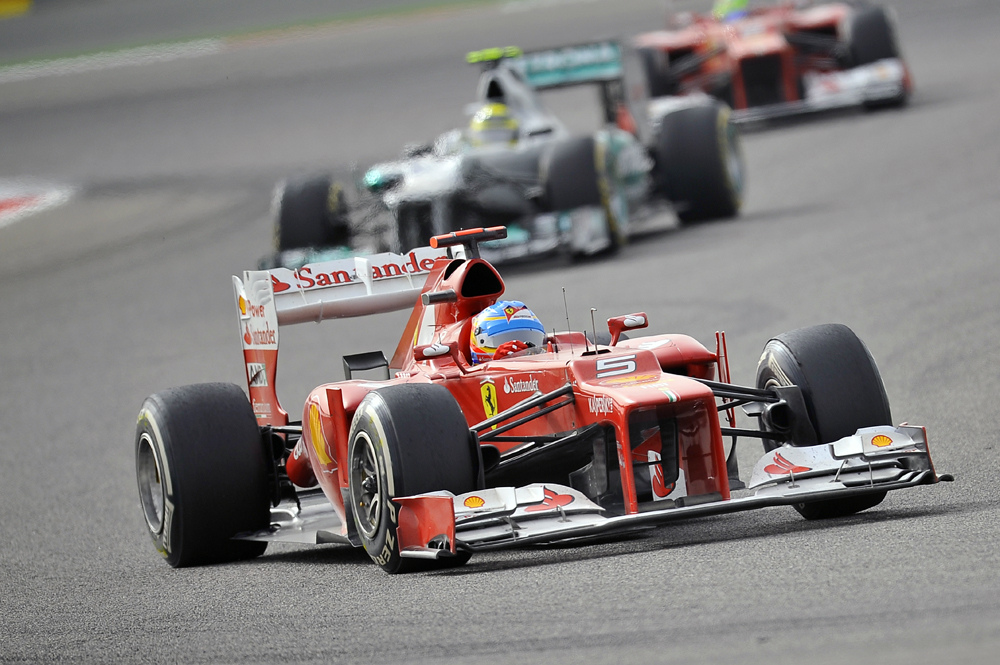
Fernando Alonso described driving the Ferrari F2012 as "like walking on a tightrope".

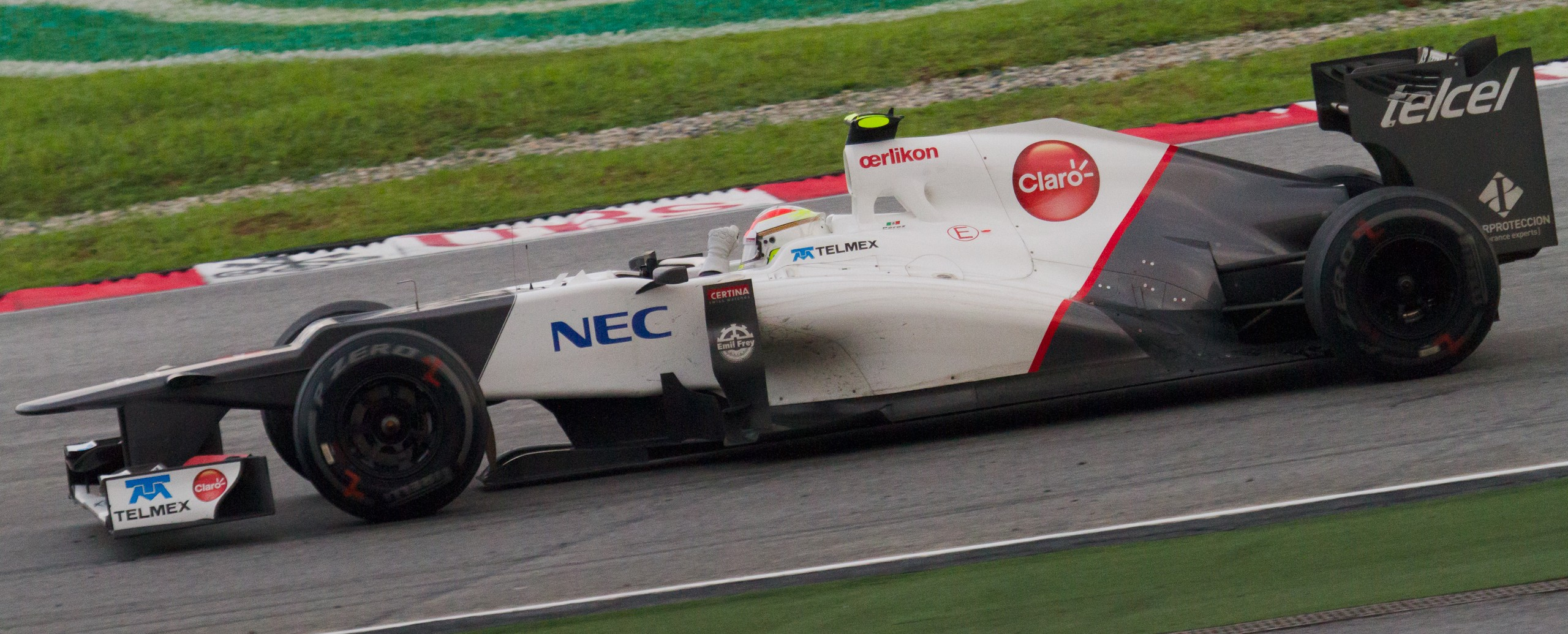
Sergio Pérez took the first podium of his career in Malaysia.

=== Round 2 – Malaysia Sepang International Circuit ===
McLaren locked out the front row of the grid for the second race in succession, with Lewis Hamilton once again on pole. Both HRT cars qualified for the race, but filled out the final row of the grid almost two seconds behind Marussia's Charles Pic in twenty-second position. In the race, Hamilton made a better start than Jenson Button, but his lead was short-lived; heavy rain interrupted the race, forcing the suspension of the Grand Prix. When the race restarted an hour later, Button was involved in contact with Narain Karthikeyan that forced him to make an unscheduled stop for a new front wing, while Hamilton had a slow pit stop and was held in the lane while other cars passed. Fernando Alonso inherited the lead, with Sauber's Sergio Pérez a surprise second, having made an early stop for extreme wet weather tyres and then taking advantage of a rush to the pit lane to position himself in third at the restart. As the race wore on, Pérez began to quickly catch Alonso on a drying track. Daniel Ricciardo was the first driver to pit for dry-weather tyres on lap 38, triggering another round of stops. Sauber and Pérez initially looked as if they had left their stop too late when Pérez emerged from the pits five seconds behind Alonso, but he began catching the two-time World Champion at the same rate as he had before. Pérez closed to within half a second with seven laps to go, but ran wide at turn 14 and lost five seconds, later admitting that it was his mistake. He was unable to close the gap, and Alonso went on to win the race by two seconds, the win giving him a five-point lead in the championship. Pérez was second, taking his first podium and Sauber's best ever result as an independent team. Hamilton finished third ahead of Mark Webber and Kimi Räikkönen, while Button had to settle for fourteenth. Bruno Senna finished in sixth, scoring more points in a single race than his team scored in 2011. Sebastian Vettel finished outside the points after making contact with Karthikeyan and developing a puncture.

=== Round 3 – China Shanghai International Circuit ===
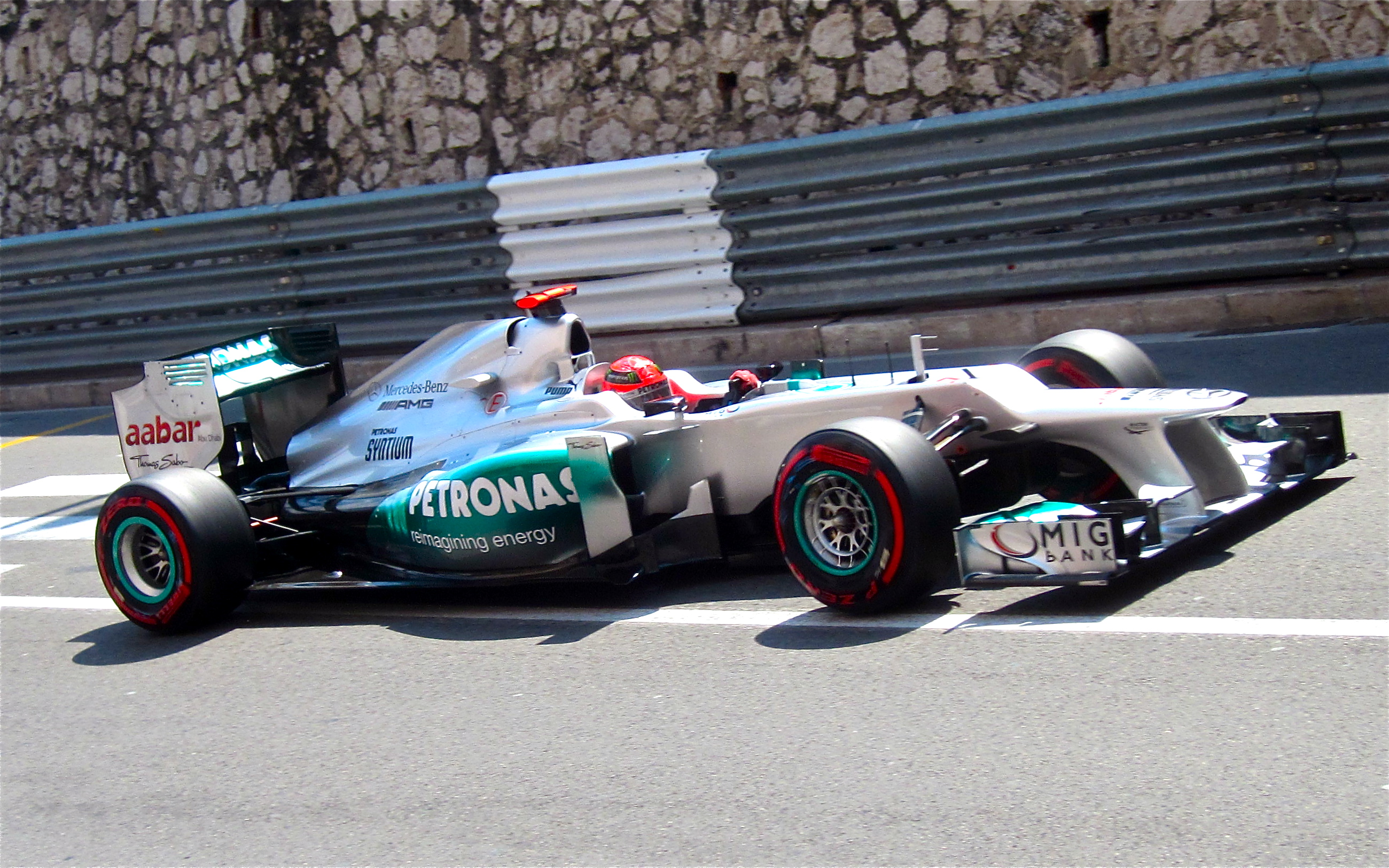
The legality of the Mercedes F1 W03's rear wing was an ongoing issue early in the season.

The championship resumed three weeks later in China, with the lead-in period to the race marked by Lotus F1 protesting the legality of Mercedes's rear wing design. The FIA rejected the protest, and with Mercedes allowed to continue racing with their car unchanged, Nico Rosberg took his – and the team's – first pole position since their return to Formula One in 2010, while a penalty to Lewis Hamilton for a gearbox change promoted Michael Schumacher to second on the grid. Schumacher would ultimately retire from the race after the first round of stops when it was discovered that one of his wheels had not been attached properly. Rosberg took an early lead in the race, and while his attempt to complete the race with only two pit stops came under threat from second-placed Jenson Button, a mistake by Button's pit crew during his final stop handed Rosberg a nineteen-second advantage over Kimi Räikkönen. Räikkönen was attempting a similar two-stop strategy, but his tyres wore out seven laps from the end of the race, and he lost eleven positions in a single lap. This forced Rosberg to drive conservatively to preserve his tyres while Button recovered from his disastrous pit stop to pass Sebastian Vettel for second. Button was held up by the incumbent World Champion long enough for Rosberg to preserve his tyres, and he became the 103rd person to win a Grand Prix. The result was also Mercedes's first win as a constructor since Juan Manuel Fangio won the 1955 Italian Grand Prix. Button was second, with Hamilton scoring his third consecutive third place, giving him a two-point championship lead over Button; Fernando Alonso, who had been leading the championship before the race, finished ninth. After two retirements in the opening rounds of the championship, Romain Grosjean scored his first points in Formula One by finishing sixth.

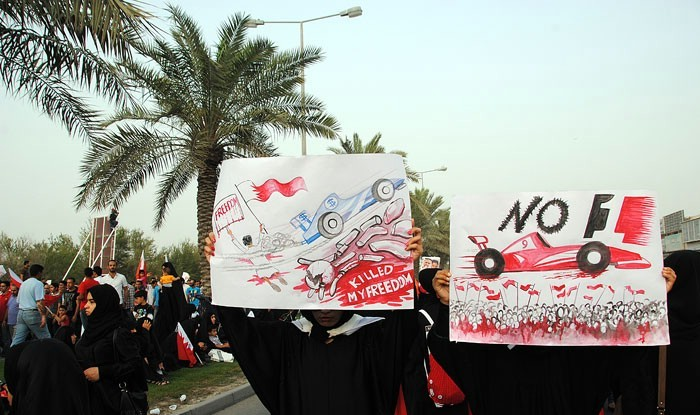
The Bahrain Grand Prix was overshadowed by civilian protests against the ruling Al Khalifa family.

=== Round 4 – Bahrain International Circuit ===
In the face of ongoing media speculation and public pressure to cancel the race due to ongoing political instability in Bahrain, the FIA released a statement at the Chinese Grand Prix confirming that the Bahrain Grand Prix would go ahead as planned. The week preceding the Grand Prix saw a renewed wave of protests against the government's attempts use the race to "tell the outside world that the whole thing is back to normal", while human rights organisations including Amnesty International criticised the decision to hold the race amid the violent crackdowns. Three days before the race, a group of Force India mechanics travelling in an unmarked hire car were involved in a petrol bombing incident at an impromptu roadblock and were briefly exposed to tear gas fired by security forces. There were no injuries or damage, but two of the mechanics involved chose to leave the country. The team later announced their intentions to race despite the incident.

Sebastian Vettel qualified on pole, his first since the 2011 Brazilian Grand Prix. Heikki Kovalainen qualified sixteenth, the second time Caterham (and its predecessor, Team Lotus) advanced beyond the first qualifying period in dry conditions. Vettel went on to win the race – becoming the fourth winner in as many races – after spending much of the race defending against Kimi Räikkönen. Having started eleventh, Räikkönen used an extra set of soft tyres to move up through the field. His team-mate, Romain Grosjean, finished third. Grosjean had initially shown the pace to challenge Vettel's lead, but unlike Räikkönen, he did not have an extra set of fresh tyres, and lost touch with the reigning World Champion after the first set of stops. Lewis Hamilton finished eighth, once again hampered by slow pit stops. He was later involved in an altercation with Nico Rosberg that saw Rosberg referred to the stewards for forcing Hamilton beyond the boundary of the circuit while defending his position, but he escaped without penalty. Hamilton went on to finish eighth, while team-mate Jenson Button was forced to retire two laps from the end of the race after reporting an unusual vibration from the differential. Daniel Ricciardo was involved in early contact that saw the Australian driver slide down the order from sixth at the start to fifteenth by the end of the race, having spent most of the Grand Prix caught behind Vitaly Petrov. Vettel's win gave him a four-point lead in the championship over Hamilton, while Mark Webber's fourth consecutive fourth place secured third overall. Red Bull Racing took the lead from McLaren in the World Constructors' Championship, while Lotus's double podium moved them into third overall.

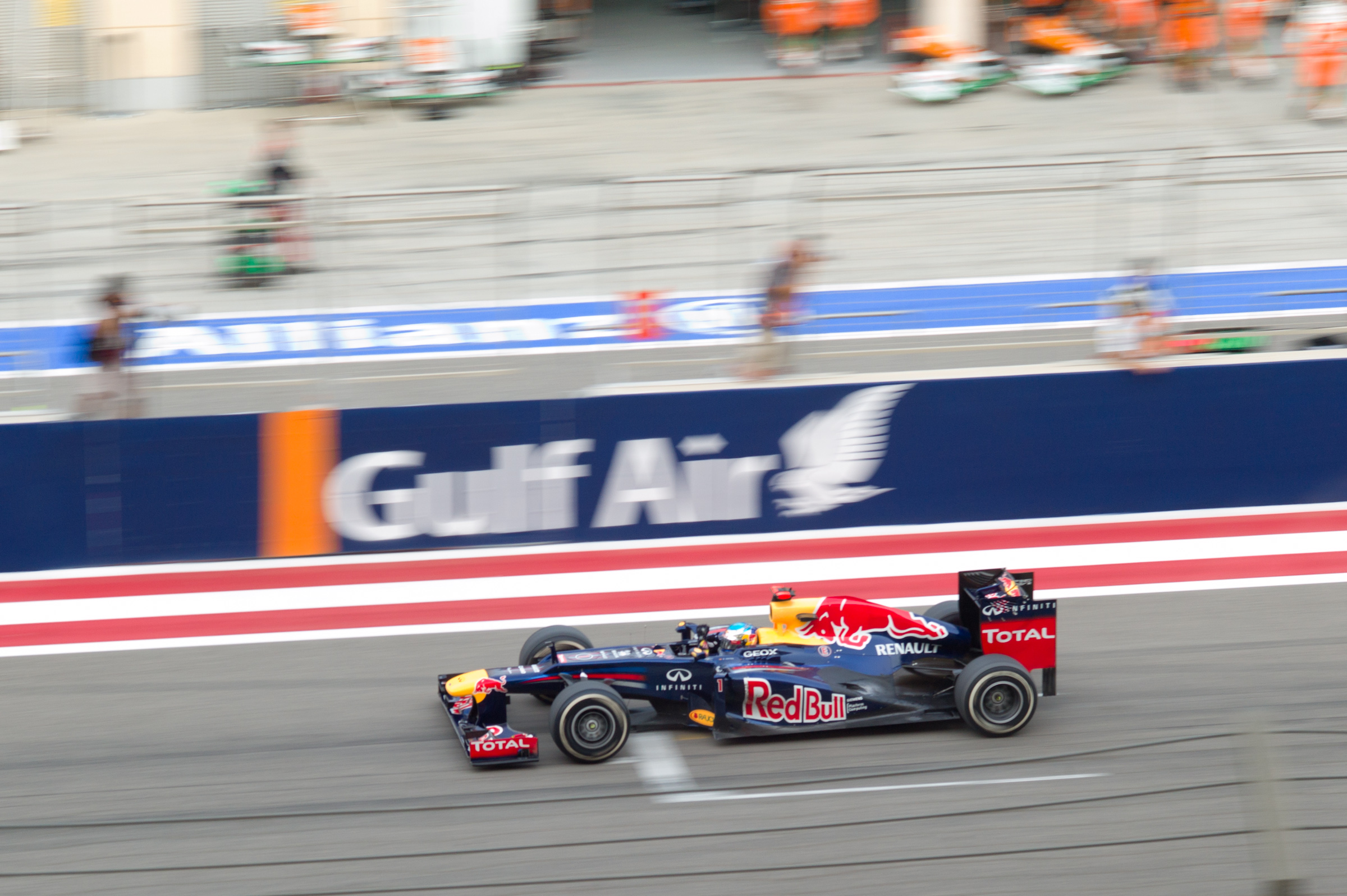
Sebastian Vettel won his first race of the 2012 season in Bahrain.

The decision to hold the race despite the ongoing protests made it one of the most controversial Grands Prix in the sport's sixty-year history.

=== Mid-season test – Mugello ===
Starting on 1 May, the teams conducted a three-day test at the Mugello Circuit in Italy ahead of the Spanish Grand Prix. The test gave teams the opportunity to assess major aerodynamic upgrades before racing them. HRT elected not to take part in the test, instead choosing to concentrate on establishing themselves at their new headquarters in Madrid. Both Lotus's trackside operations director Alan Permane and Red Bull Racing driver Mark Webber questioned the value of testing at the Mugello circuit as the characteristics of the circuit were unlike any of the circuits the championship was due to visit after the test, while Caterham driver Vitaly Petrov was critical of the choice of Mugello as a testing venue as he felt it was not safe enough for Formula One. Petrov's comments came shortly after Fernando Alonso crashed on the final morning of the test. Red Bull Racing and Lotus team principals Christian Horner and Éric Boullier were also critical of the test as they felt that the costs of conducting in-season testing outweighed any benefits, with Horner stating his opposition to continuing mid-season testing in the future.

"We drive like on raw eggs and I don't want to stress the tires at all. Otherwise you just overdo it and you go nowhere."

— Michael Schumacher's criticism of tyre supplier Pirelli's 2012 tyre compounds.

=== Round 5 – Spain Circuit de Barcelona-Catalunya ===
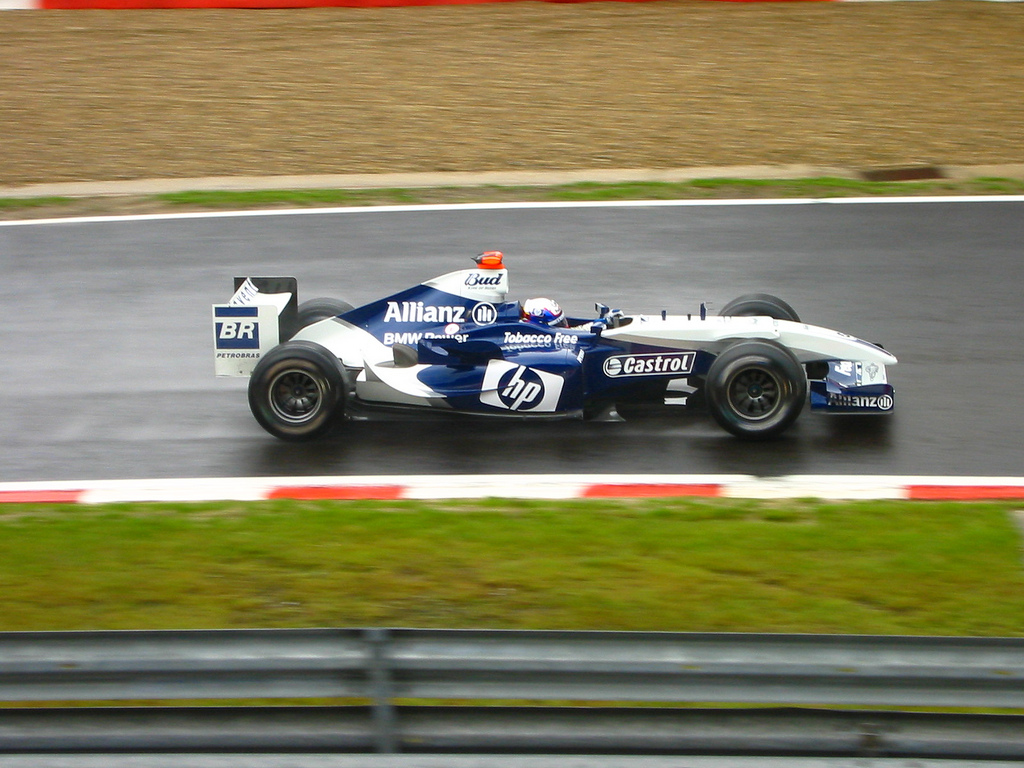

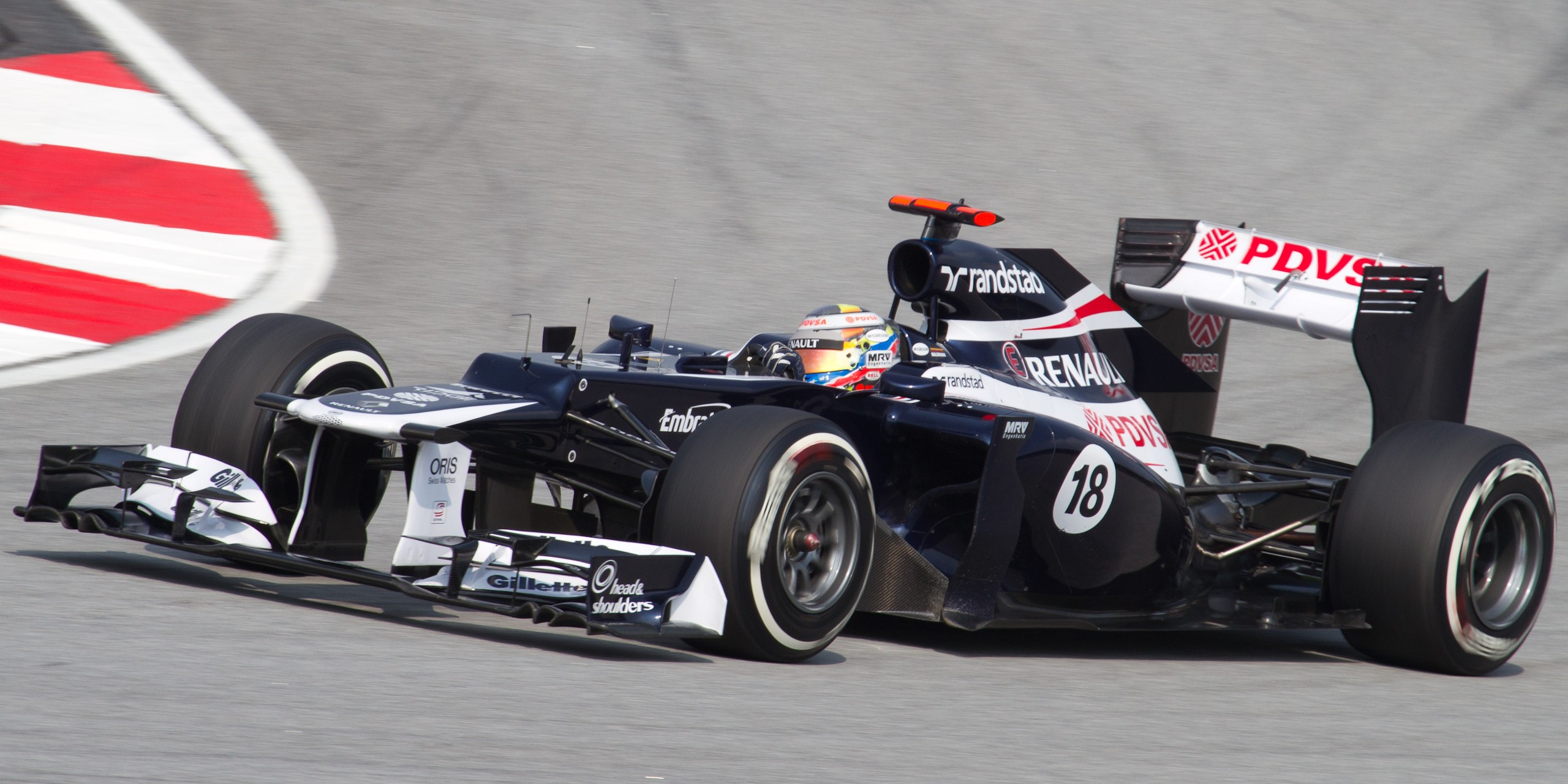
After Juan Pablo Montoya (top) won the 2004 Brazilian Grand Prix, Williams went eight years without a victory until Pastor Maldonado (bottom) won the 2012 Spanish Grand Prix.

Following criticism over the sensitivity of their tyre compounds, tyre supplier Pirelli announced changes to their tyre allocation for the Spanish Grand Prix, making pit strategy the focal point of the Grand Prix. Pirelli would later diagnose the problems with the tyre compounds as originating from developing them on a testing chassis that was two years out-of-date at the time. Lewis Hamilton took his third pole of the season, edging out Williams driver Pastor Maldonado by half a second, while Maldonado's team-mate Bruno Senna was eliminated early when he spun. Hamilton was later excluded from the qualifying results after his car did not have enough fuel to return to the pits for scrutineering, promoting Maldonado to pole position and moving Hamilton to the back of the grid. Fernando Alonso took the lead of the race at the first corner, but Maldonado reclaimed it during the second round of pit stops, when his team forced Ferrari to pit early while Alonso was held up by the Marussia of Charles Pic. Maldonado maintained a lead of seven seconds over Alonso, but a mistake by his crew during the third pit stop cost him time and left him vulnerable to the Ferrari driver in the final stint of the race. Meanwhile, third-placed Kimi Räikkönen moved to an ambitious strategy that would see him attempt to force Maldonado and Alonso to race beyond the life expectancy of their tyres, allowing him to swoop in at the last minute to steal first place. Räikkönen's strategy failed as Maldonado withstood pressure from Alonso for fifteen laps, winning the race by three seconds and becoming the first Venezuelan driver to win a Formula One Grand Prix. It was Williams's first win in one hundred and thirty Grand Prix starts; their previous race win was Juan Pablo Montoya's victory at the 2004 Brazilian Grand Prix. Lewis Hamilton recovered from twenty-fourth on the grid to finish eighth, while Sebastian Vettel overcame a drive-through penalty and an unscheduled stop for a technical fault that forced his team to replace his front wing to make a late move on Nico Rosberg for sixth place that would preserve his championship lead.

=== Round 6 – Monaco Circuit de Monaco ===
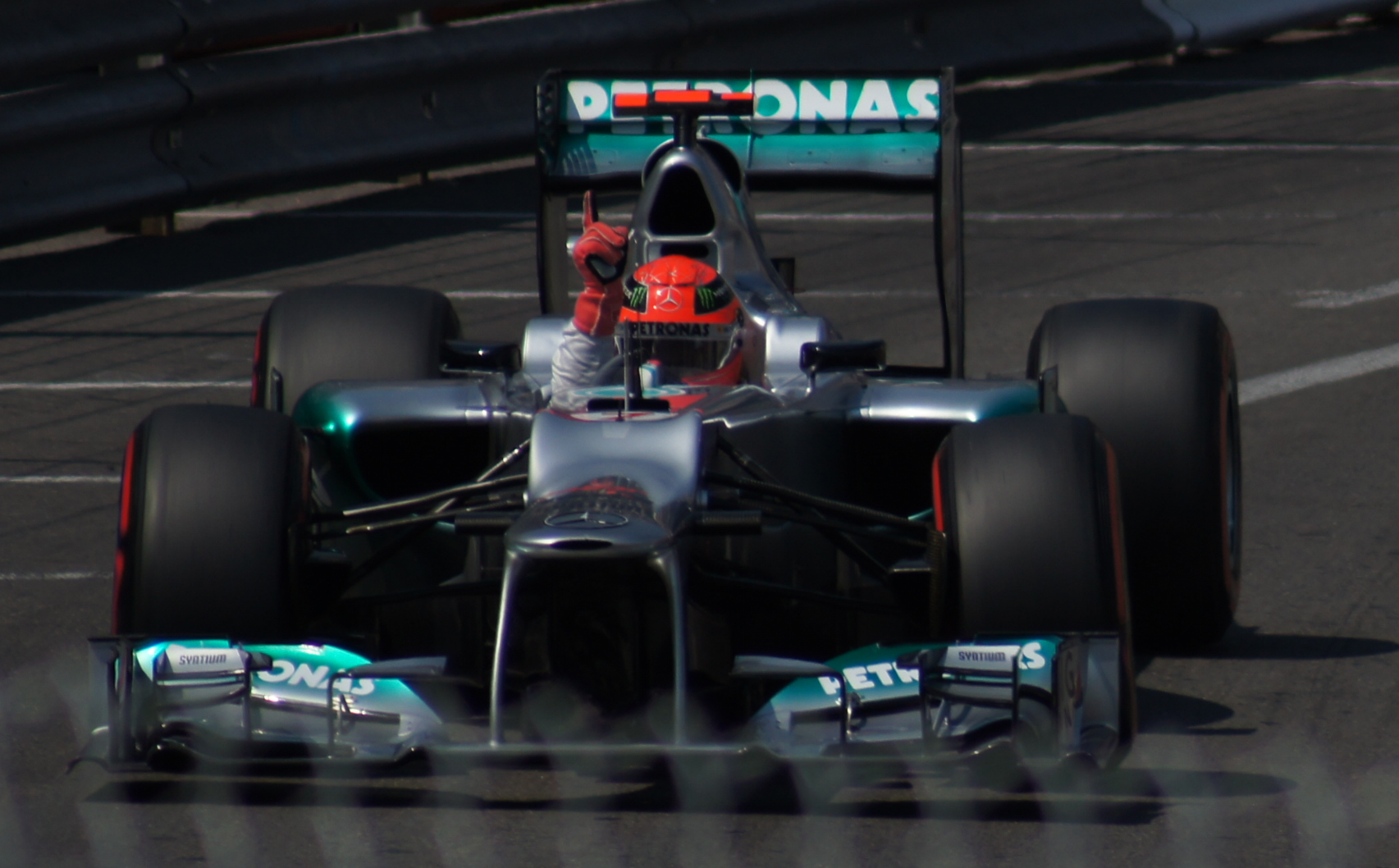
Although Schumacher qualified in pole, he received a five-grid penalty due to a collision with Bruno Senna. He also retired from the race.

For the second consecutive race, the fastest driver in qualifying did not start the race from pole. Michael Schumacher set the fastest time, but a five-place grid penalty left him sixth overall. Two hours before the race, protests against parts introduced onto the floor of the Red Bull RB8 left team principal Christian Horner with a choice: to change the offending parts and start both cars from the pit lane, guaranteeing that any result the team recorded would be preserved; or to leave the parts on the car, allowing both drivers to start the race from the positions they qualified in, but risking a post-race exclusion. Horner ultimately chose the latter option, and Mark Webber started from pole, establishing an early lead over Nico Rosberg as a first-corner accident eliminated four cars. The race was run under the constant threat of rain, with drivers trying to extend the life of their tyres to avoid being forced to make an additional stop and falling down the order. The rain never materialised, though Jean-Éric Vergne was observed using a set of intermediate tyres late in the race. The variety of strategies used by the front-runners resulted in the last ten laps being contested with the top six cars running nose-to-tail. Webber visibly faded in the final laps, but held on when the following cars were momentarily pinned behind the slow-moving Heikki Kovalainen. Webber won the race – his second on the streets of Monaco – with Rosberg second and Fernando Alonso third, the result giving Alonso a three-point lead in the championship. Red Bull Racing maintained their lead in the Constructors' Championship as rival teams chose not to follow through on the threat of their pre-race protest, while Kovalainen finished thirteenth to see Caterham overtake Marussia for tenth place. Elsewhere, Spanish Grand Prix winner Pastor Maldonado was given a ten-place grid penalty for an incident that saw him clip Sergio Pérez. Combined with a five-place penalty for changing his gearbox, Maldonado started from the back row of the grid where he was eliminated in the first-corner accident.

"It really pisses me off, to be honest, because the car has passed every single technical regulation after the race. All of the teams that were against it did not make any protest after Monaco. The car passed the test after Bahrain, the car passed the test after Monaco, and now there has been a clarification on the rule. And the rule now is different. We had a car which was legal for the first part of the season. And now the rule has been changed and we'll start again."

— Mark Webber's response to claims he won the Monaco Grand Prix with an "illegal car".

=== Round 7 – Canada Circuit Gilles Villeneuve ===
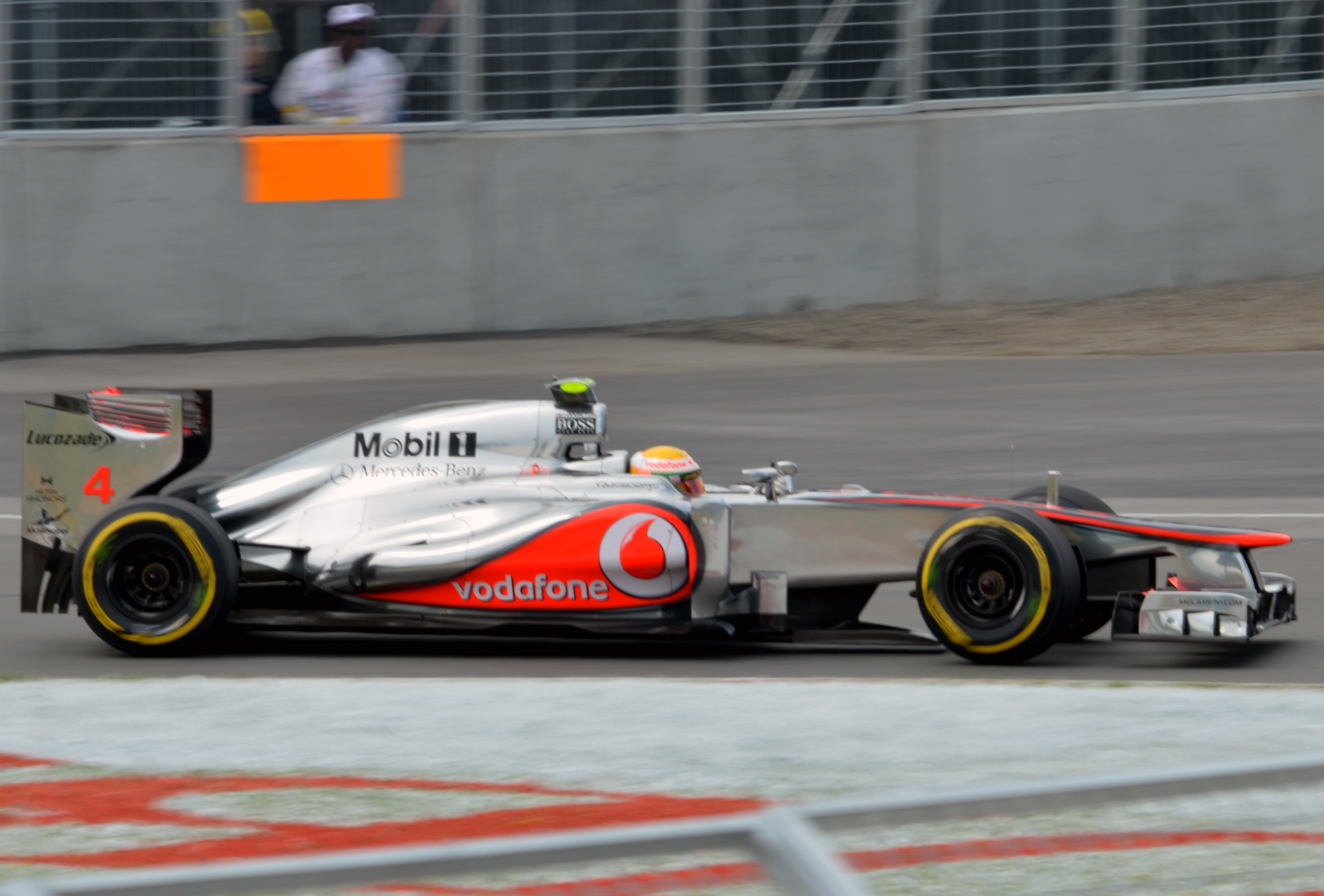
Lewis Hamilton became the seventh winner of the season when he won the Canadian Grand Prix.

One week before the Canadian Grand Prix, the FIA declared the floor used by Red Bull in Monaco to be illegal, forcing the team to change the offending parts for the Canadian Grand Prix. Despite the ruling, the team's results were kept intact. The team was also forced to change the design of their axles, after FIA Race Director Charlie Whiting felt that holes in the axles contravened the technical regulations. Nevertheless, Sebastian Vettel comfortably took pole position by three-tenths of a second. Vettel controlled the early phase of the race, but was caught and passed by Lewis Hamilton before the first round of stops, while Fernando Alonso slipped through shortly afterwards. All three drivers were using a two-stop strategy at the time, but as Hamilton made his second stop, both Alonso and Vettel shifted to a one-stop strategy, with Alonso's team resorting to discussing strategy options in his native Spanish to prevent their rivals from overhearing their plans. Hamilton had twenty laps to make up a twelve-second deficit, and he easily reeled Vettel in; in response, Red Bull pitted the reigning World Champion, and Vettel fell to fifth. Hamilton's next target was Alonso, whose tyres lost all grip and he fell victim to Hamilton, Romain Grosjean, Sergio Pérez and Vettel in quick succession. Hamilton won the race, becoming the seventh winner in seven races and taking a two-point lead in the championship. Grosjean's second place saw Lotus take third place in the Constructors' Championship from Ferrari. Both Grosjean and Pérez expressed surprise at finishing on the podium, while 2011 winner Jenson Button finished sixteenth in what he described as his "worst race in years" and Michael Schumacher suffered a hydraulics failure that left his drag reduction system (DRS) device jammed in the open position.

=== Round 8 – Europe Valencia Street Circuit ===
Fernando Alonso became the first man to win two races in 2012 at the European Grand Prix in Valencia, scoring his first home win since the 2006 Spanish Grand Prix. Starting eleventh, he was forced to navigate his way through traffic, narrowly avoiding early contact between Bruno Senna and Kamui Kobayashi as Sebastian Vettel broke free of the field to establish a twenty-second lead by the first round of stops. Vettel's lead was quashed when Heikki Kovalainen and Jean-Éric Vergne made contact, triggering the deployment of the safety car to clear debris from the circuit. Alonso found himself third at the restart and pounced on a mistake by second-placed Romain Grosjean to lead the chase against Vettel. Vettel pulled away once more, but his lead was short-lived as he lost drive and his engine shut down on lap 33. Grosjean attempted to challenge Alonso, but was forced out of the race with an alternator problem seven laps later, leaving Alonso in the lead, four seconds clear of Lewis Hamilton and Kimi Räikkönen. As the race entered the final laps, Räikkönen forced his way past Hamilton to secure second place, but Pastor Maldonado's attempts to take third place ended with Hamilton in the barrier and a broken nose for the Williams driver. Maldonado finished tenth, but was given a post-race drive-through penalty and was classified twelfth. Meanwhile, Michael Schumacher and Mark Webber had started to carve their way through the field by virtue of a late pit stop and easily picked off the minor points positions and taking advantage of the Maldonado—Hamilton collision to finish third and fourth behind Alonso and Räikkönen. It was Schumacher's first podium since the 2006 Chinese Grand Prix. Alonso's win cemented a twenty-point lead in the championship, whilst Vettel's retirement relegated him to fourth overall, twenty-six points behind Alonso.

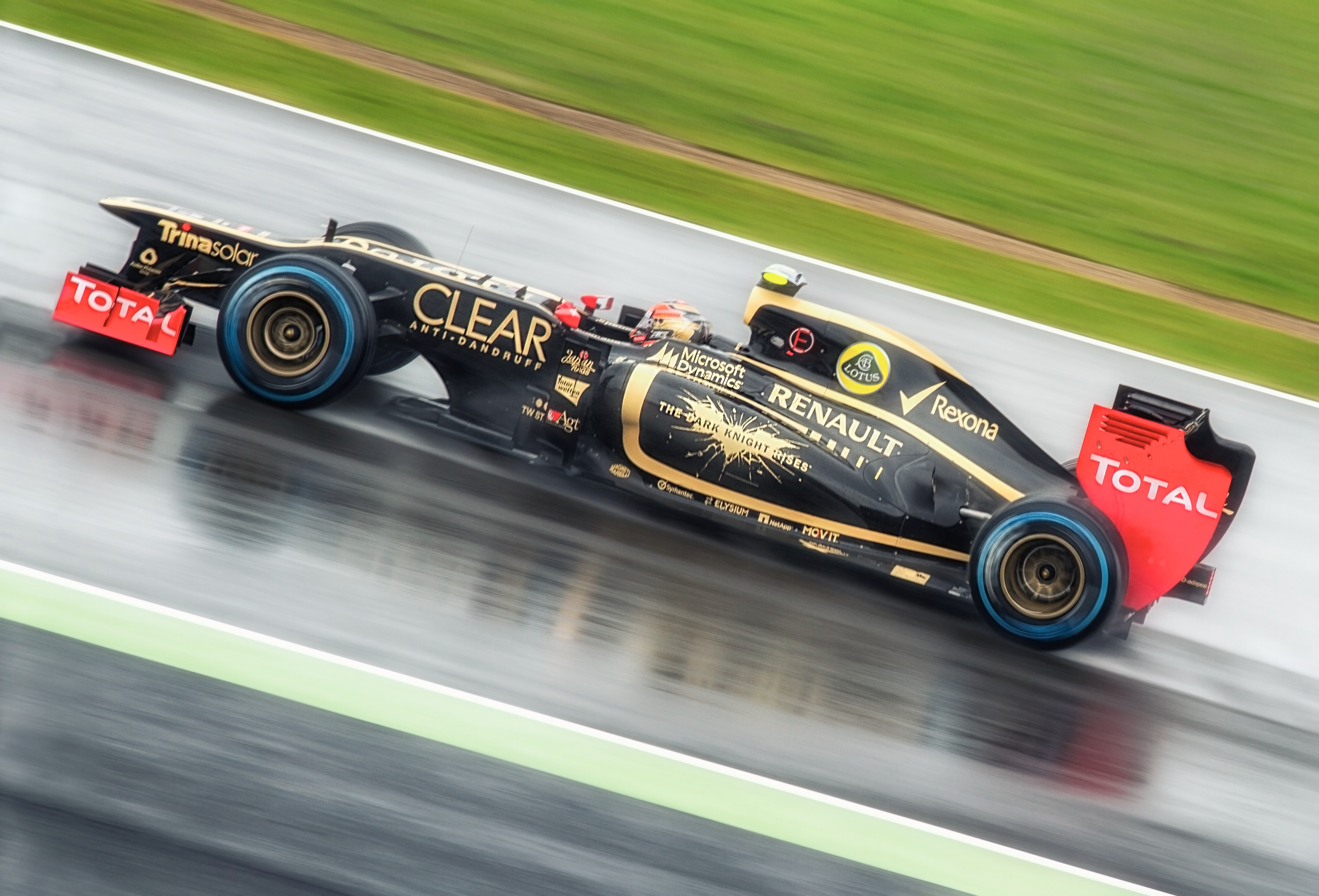
Heavy rain forced the suspension of qualifying for the British Grand Prix.

=== Round 9 – Great Britain Silverstone Circuit ===
Difficult conditions greeted the teams upon their arrival at the Silverstone Circuit, as parts of the Midlands received a month's rainfall in the space of two days. The torrential rain lasted throughout the weekend, forcing qualifying to be suspended for ninety minutes, before race day dawned clear. The circuit was declared dry, allowing the drivers to start on the tyre compound of their choice, with Alonso on the harder tyre streaking away at the start while Paul di Resta crashed at Aintree on the first lap after making contact with Romain Grosjean. As the leaders settled into a rhythm, Pastor Maldonado and Sergio Pérez collided at Brooklands, prompting an angry response from the Mexican driver. Perez's teammate Kamui Kobayashi also ran into trouble, locking his tyres as he entered his pit box and hitting three members of his pit crew, though none were seriously injured. The race was ultimately decided by the choice of tyre in the first stint as Alonso moved onto the softer option and Webber onto the harder prime for the final phase of the race. Webber caught Alonso with five laps to go, passing him on the Wellington Straight. Webber held on for his second win of the season, with Vettel third and Felipe Massa in fourth, his best result since achieving a podium in South Korea in 2010. The result meant Webber closed to within thirteen points of Alonso's championship lead, with both drivers breaking away from third-placed Vettel. After showing early promise in the wet conditions, McLaren went backwards in the dry, losing second place in the Constructors' Championship to Ferrari and third to Lotus.

=== Round 10 – Germany Hockenheimring ===
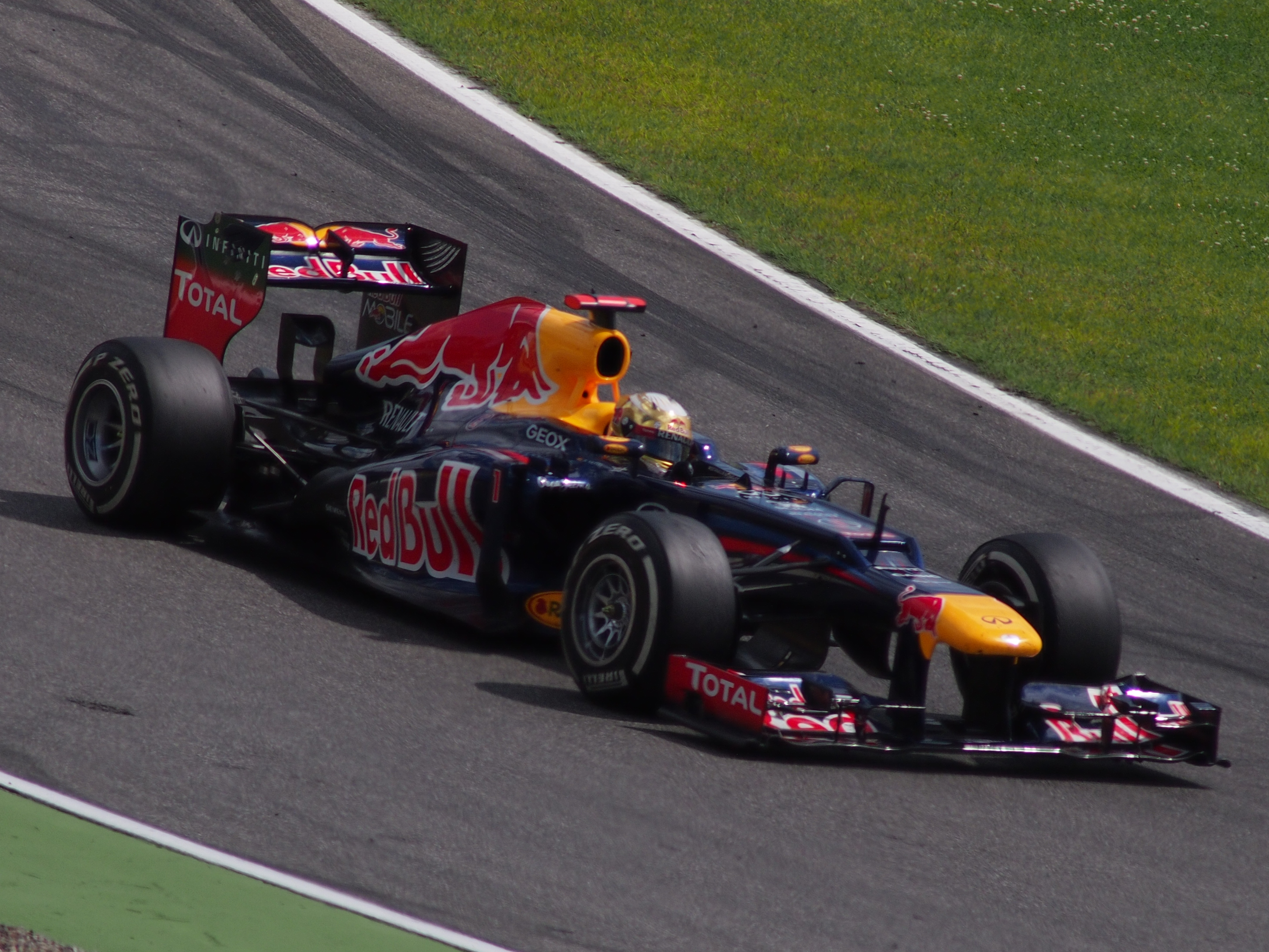
Reigning World Constructors' Champion Red Bull was involved in several technical disputes that challenged the legality of its car.

Limited running in practice and a wet qualifying session meant that teams had to improvise their strategies at the Hockenheimring. Fernando Alonso controlled much of the race from pole position, only relinquishing the lead when he pitted, and he went on to take his third victory of the season. Lewis Hamilton's one hundredth Grand Prix started with a disaster when he picked up a puncture on the third lap and spent most of the race at the tail end of the field before retiring on lap 56 with a suspension problem. Confusion briefly reigned when Hamilton, in seventeenth place at the time, began lapping faster than the leaders and sought to unlap himself. Sebastian Vettel later claimed that this was a ploy by McLaren to force both him and Alonso to drive defensively against Hamilton, slowing them down enough to allow team-mate Jenson Button to leap-frog them at the second round of stops; Vettel lost a position to Button, but Alonso was unaffected, as Ferrari pitted him before Hamilton could interfere with his race. Button briefly looked as if he had the pace to pass Alonso for the race lead, but the race was deadlocked in the final twenty laps, and Button began to fade in the final five laps of the race. The race was marked by another technical dispute regarding Red Bull Racing, who were referred to the stewards by FIA Technical Delegate Jo Bauer for what he felt was an illegal engine map in use on the Red Bull RB8. The stewards elected to take no action against Red Bull, stating that the team had not violated any of the technical regulations, but noted that they did not accept all of the arguments presented by the team when asked to explain. The stewards were less forgiving of Vettel, who ran wide at the hairpin while trying to pass Button and could only complete the pass outside the limits of the circuit. Vettel had twenty seconds added to his race time as a penalty, demoting him to fifth overall. With Button promoted to second, Kimi Räikkönen inherited third place and Kamui Kobayashi was classified a then season-best fourth.

=== Round 11 – Hungary Hungaroring ===
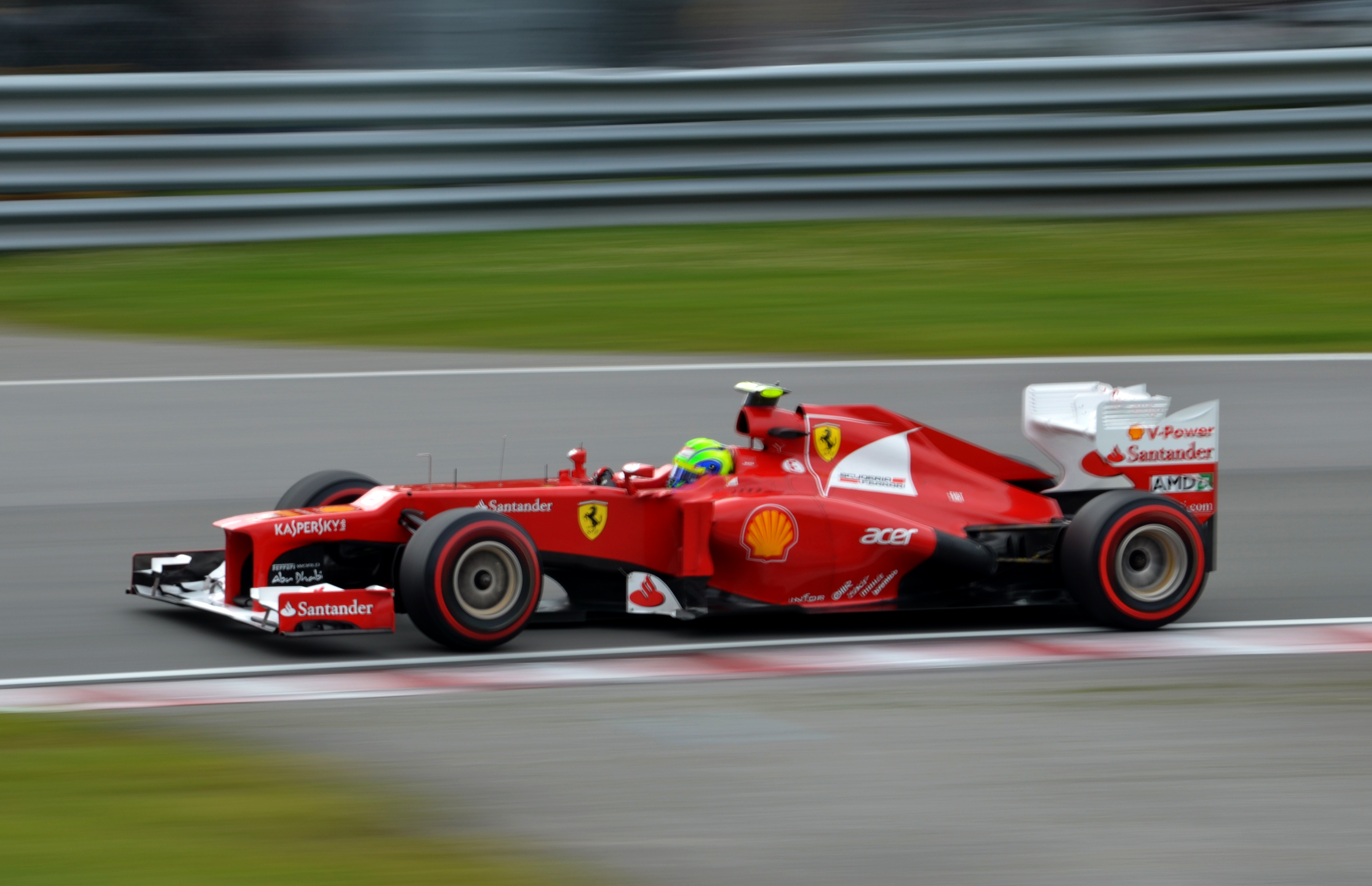
Following the mid-season break, Ferrari's Felipe Massa was in fourteenth place in the championship, 139 points behind team-mate and championship leader Fernando Alonso.

As the championship moved into the second half of the season, Fernando Alonso maintained a thirty-four-point lead over his nearest rival, Mark Webber, with Sebastian Vettel a further ten points behind. Alonso's outlook for the race was dour, qualifying sixth and pinning his hopes on a wet race as Lewis Hamilton continued McLaren's mid-season resurgence, returning to pole position for the first time since the Malaysian Grand Prix. Following an aborted start triggered by Michael Schumacher lining up in the wrong grid position and then shutting his engine off in the confusion, Hamilton and Grosjean lead the field away. After prematurely moving Jenson Button onto a three-stop strategy, McLaren gave Hamilton the order to hold position as the tight confines of the Hungaroring circuit forced the teams to try to make up positions in the pits. This was evidenced by Kimi Räikkönen, who inherited the lead after the first set of stops and produced a series of fast laps that allowed him to rejoin in second, coming dangerously close to team-mate Grosjean under brakes as he emerged from the pit lane. Despite taking two seconds out of Hamilton's lead within five laps of rejoining the race, Räikkönen was powerless to reel Hamilton in any further. Hamilton won the race, the nineteenth of his career, with Räikkönen second and Grosjean in third. Hamilton's victory brought with it twenty-five points that put him back in championship contention, while a late decision by Red Bull to move Mark Webber onto a three-stop strategy saw the Australian slip further behind Fernando Alonso, as the Spaniard extended his championship lead to forty points.

=== Round 12 – Belgium Circuit de Spa-Francorchamps ===
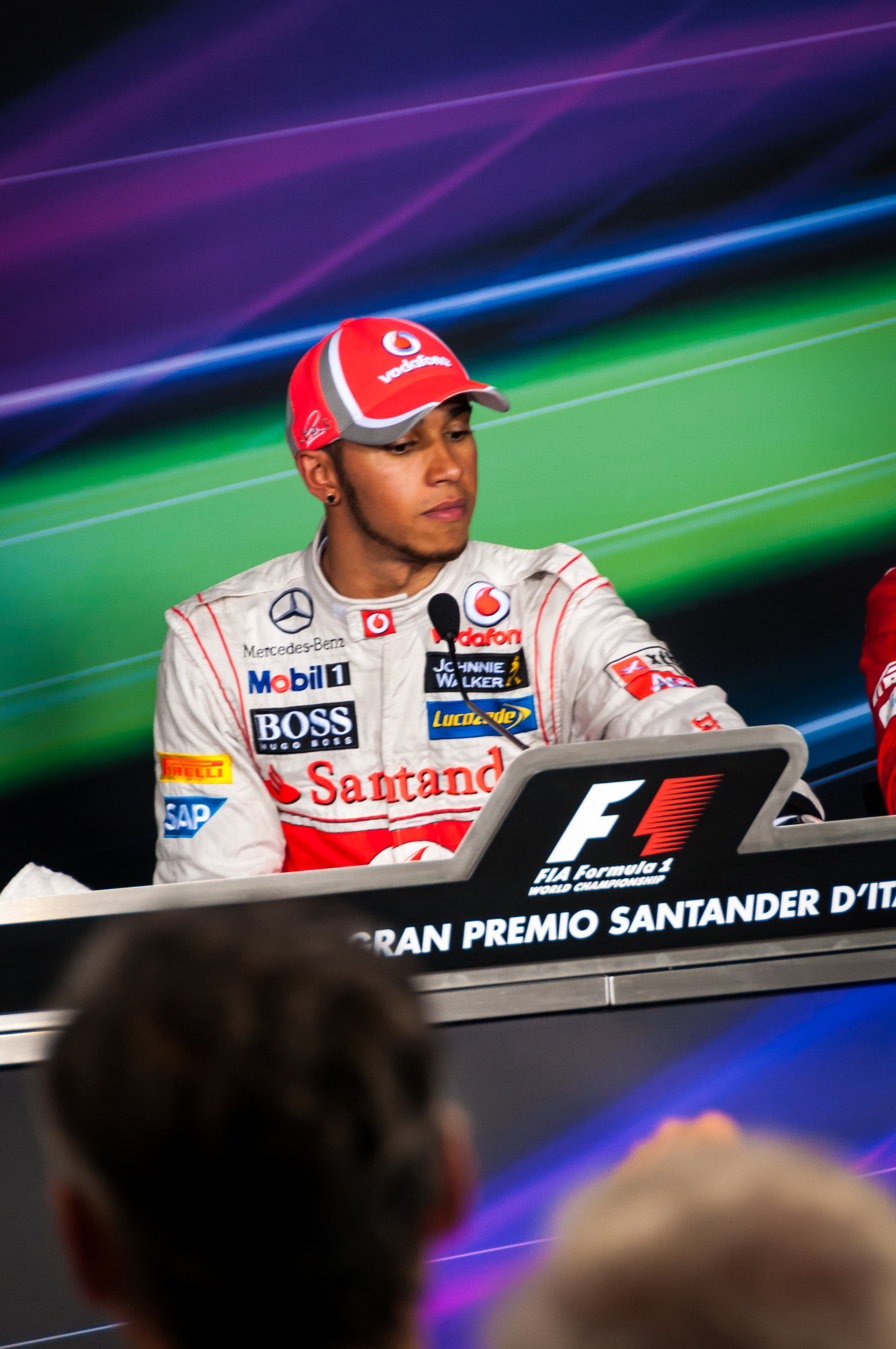
Lewis Hamilton's future was a source of ongoing speculation during the second half of the season, amid contract negotiations with McLaren and Mercedes.

The championship resumed one month later in Belgium. Jenson Button qualified on pole and broke away at the start while a four-car pile-up started behind him when Romain Grosjean made contact with Lewis Hamilton and they both slammed into Fernando Alonso and Sergio Pérez, eliminating all four on the spot and triggering the safety car. Kamui Kobayashi's car was also damaged, and Pastor Maldonado was spun around amidst the chaos. Grosjean was later given a one-race ban for causing the collision, becoming the first driver in eighteen years to be banned from racing. Maldonado retired shortly after the restart with a broken front wing after making contact with Timo Glock, while Narain Karthikeyan spun off at Stavelot mid-way through the race when his wheel came loose. Button controlled the race from the front and was unchallenged throughout, while Sebastian Vettel clawed his way up to second from tenth on the grid. Kimi Räikkönen started and finished third, let down by a conservative pit strategy that forced him to make a second stop late in the race in order to use both compounds of tyre as per the rules – even when it became apparent that Button and Vettel were racing on a one-stop strategy – and Nico Hülkenberg finished in a career-best fourth place. Button's win allowed him to regain precious ground on the championship fight, while Alonso's retirement from the race and Vettel's second place moved the reigning World Champion to within twenty-four points of the championship lead. Scuderia Toro Rosso scored their first points since the Malaysian Grand Prix, with Jean-Éric Vergne and Daniel Ricciardo finishing eighth and ninth respectively. Further down the order, Caterham was summoned to the stewards on charges of an unsafe pit release when Heikki Kovalainen was released directly into the path of Karthikeyan and the team was given a €10,000 fine for the incident.

"When you love racing this is very hard. I accept my mistake. We know that La Source is a very tough corner. [...] I did a mistake [sic] and I misjudged the gap with Lewis [Hamilton]. I was sure I was in front of him. So a small mistake made a big incident. I didn't change my line, I went from left to right. I was not really wanting to put anyone in the wall – I'm not here to stop the race in the first corner. I'm very, very sorry and I'm glad that nobody is hurt. But I have to say it is a very, very hard decision to hear."

— Romain Grosjean's response to being given a one-race ban for causing a multi-car pile-up at the start of the Belgian Grand Prix.

=== Round 13 – Italy Autodromo Nazionale Monza ===
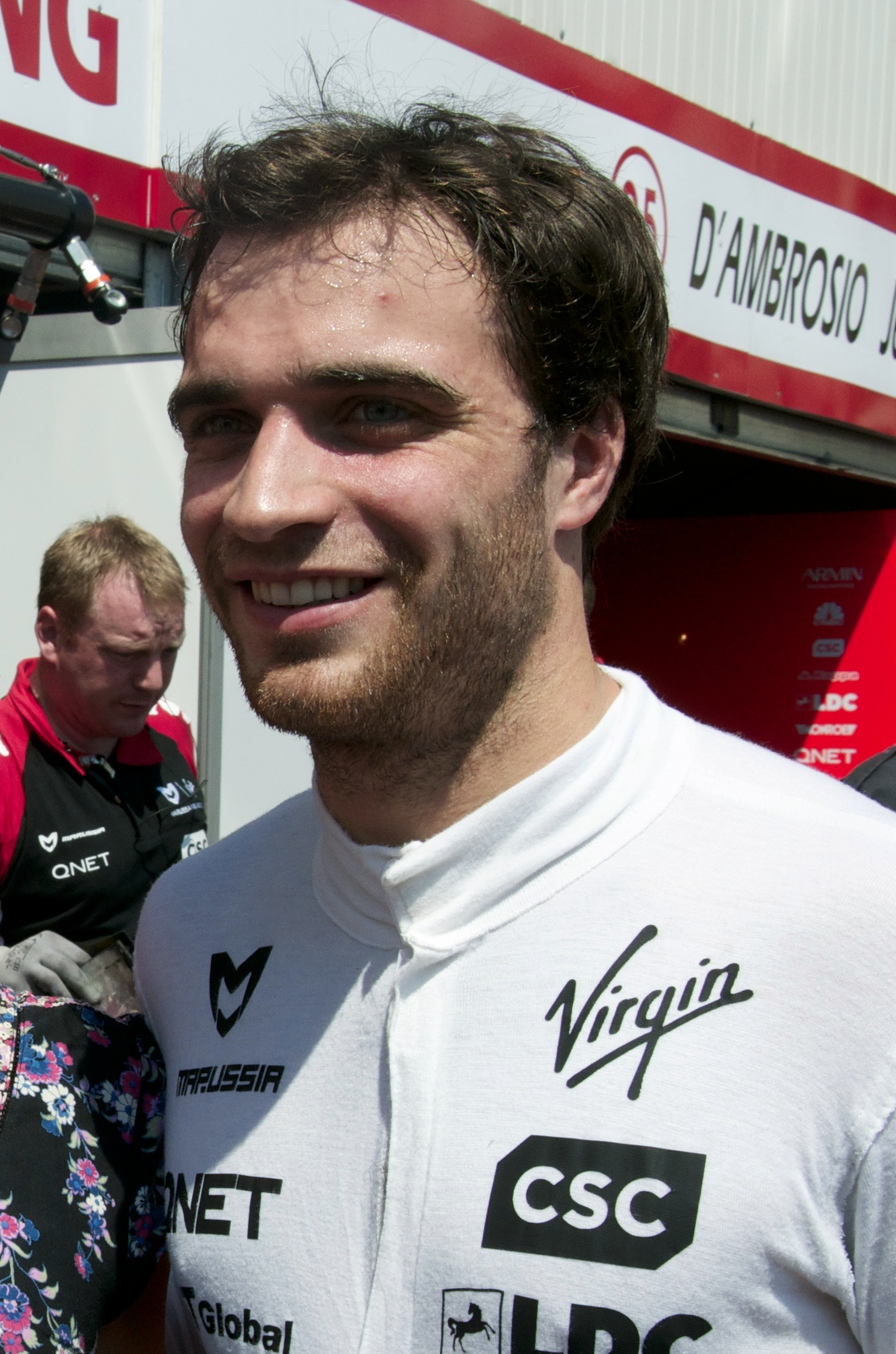
Jérôme d'Ambrosio – seen here at the 2011 Monaco Grand Prix – replaced Romain Grosjean for the Italian Grand Prix.

The final race in Europe took place at Monza. Ferrari's early bid to put Fernando Alonso on pole position by way of using Felipe Massa to offer him a slipstream ended in disaster when Alonso's rear anti-roll bar failed in the final period of qualifying, leaving the championship leader marooned in tenth while Lewis Hamilton took pole. Hamilton asserted early control over the race, and while Ferrari made significant ground early on to be running second and third – despite losing the data uplink between their cars and the pit wall that provided them with telemetry – it was Sergio Pérez who proved to be Hamilton's biggest challenge. Starting outside the top ten, Pérez elected to start on the harder compound tyres and complete one stop, producing fastest lap after fastest lap as McLaren's confidence was broken when Jenson Button's car was paralysed by a fuel pressure problem. Hamilton would ultimately prevail, but he was forced to push in the final few laps to maintain his lead, and won the race by four seconds as Pérez claimed his third podium of the season with second place. Alonso went on to finish third, benefiting from Button's retirement and a drive-through penalty for Sebastian Vettel when the reigning World Champion forced him so wide through the Curva Grande that Alonso was forced off the circuit. Bruno Senna later criticised the race stewards for not penalising Paul di Resta for a similar altercation on the approach to the Variante della Roggia early in the race. Meanwhile, with Romain Grosjean serving his suspension, Lotus enlisted former Marussia F1 driver Jérôme d'Ambrosio as their second driver for the weekend. He qualified sixteenth, and went on to finish thirteenth overall.

Red Bull Racing suffered a double retirement, with Vettel falling victim to another alternator failure and Mark Webber spinning violently at the Ascari chicane, with the resultant damage to his tyres sending vibrations through the car that forced him to retire. This allowed Hamilton to leapfrog both drivers and Kimi Räikkönen – who finished the race fifth – to take second place in the World Drivers' Championship, with the result enabling McLaren to close the gap to Red Bull in the World Constructors' Championship.

=== Round 14 – Singapore Marina Bay Street Circuit ===
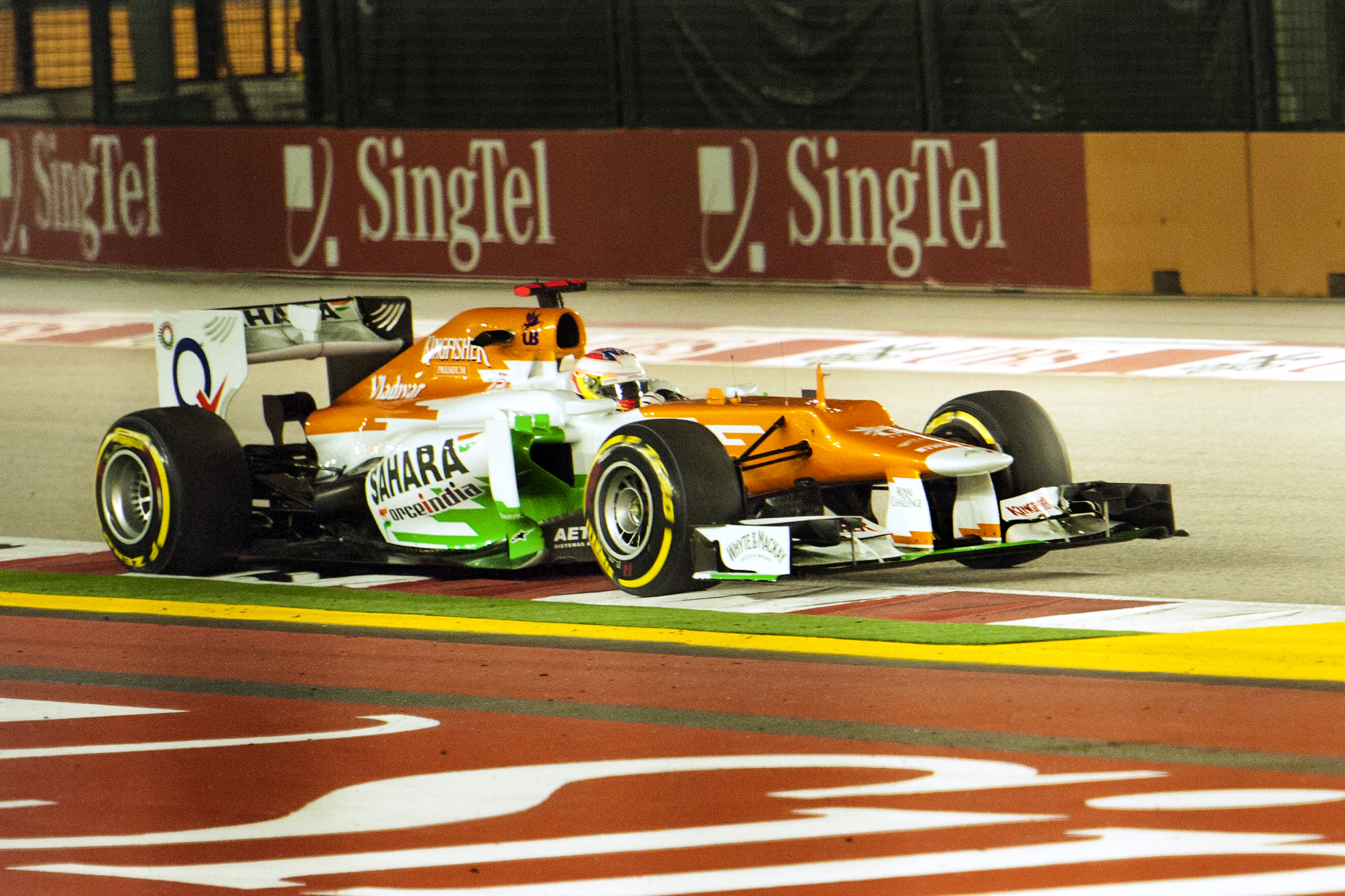
Paul di Resta finished in a career-best fourth place in Singapore.

As the teams returned to Asia, the focus shifted to the championship race. Lewis Hamilton put himself in the ideal position to take the fight to Fernando Alonso, qualifying on pole whilst Alonso could only manage fifth place. In the physically most demanding race of the year, the teams jostled for position through the first phase of the Grand Prix, trying to position themselves for the final ten laps. Just as the drivers established a rhythm, Hamilton's gearbox failed, forcing him out of the race and handing the lead to Sebastian Vettel. The race was shortened by two laps to fit the two-hour time limit for a Grand Prix following a pair of lengthy safety car interventions; first, Narain Karthikeyan understeered into the barriers under the grandstands on lap 30, forcing the safety car to be deployed. The drivers had little opportunity to get comfortable on the restart, as Michael Schumacher misjudged his braking point at the end of the Esplanade Bridge, careening into the back of Jean-Éric Vergne and triggering the safety car for the second time in an accident that was a near mirror-image of his collision with Sergio Pérez in 2011. He was later given a ten-place grid penalty for the Japanese Grand Prix. Vettel controlled the race from the second restart, beating Jenson Button to the line, for his second win of the season and his first since the Bahrain Grand Prix five months previously. Alonso completed the podium, retaining his championship lead after defending from Paul di Resta late in the race. Elsewhere, a string of retirements – including a late engine problem for Bruno Senna, which left the Brazilian with minor burns to his back – and a series of altercations involving Mark Webber, Nico Hülkenberg, Kamui Kobayashi and Sergio Pérez as they fought over the minor points positions allowed Timo Glock to finish twelfth, the result seeing Marussia retake tenth position in the World Constructors' Championship from Caterham.

=== Round 15 – Japan Suzuka International Racing Course ===
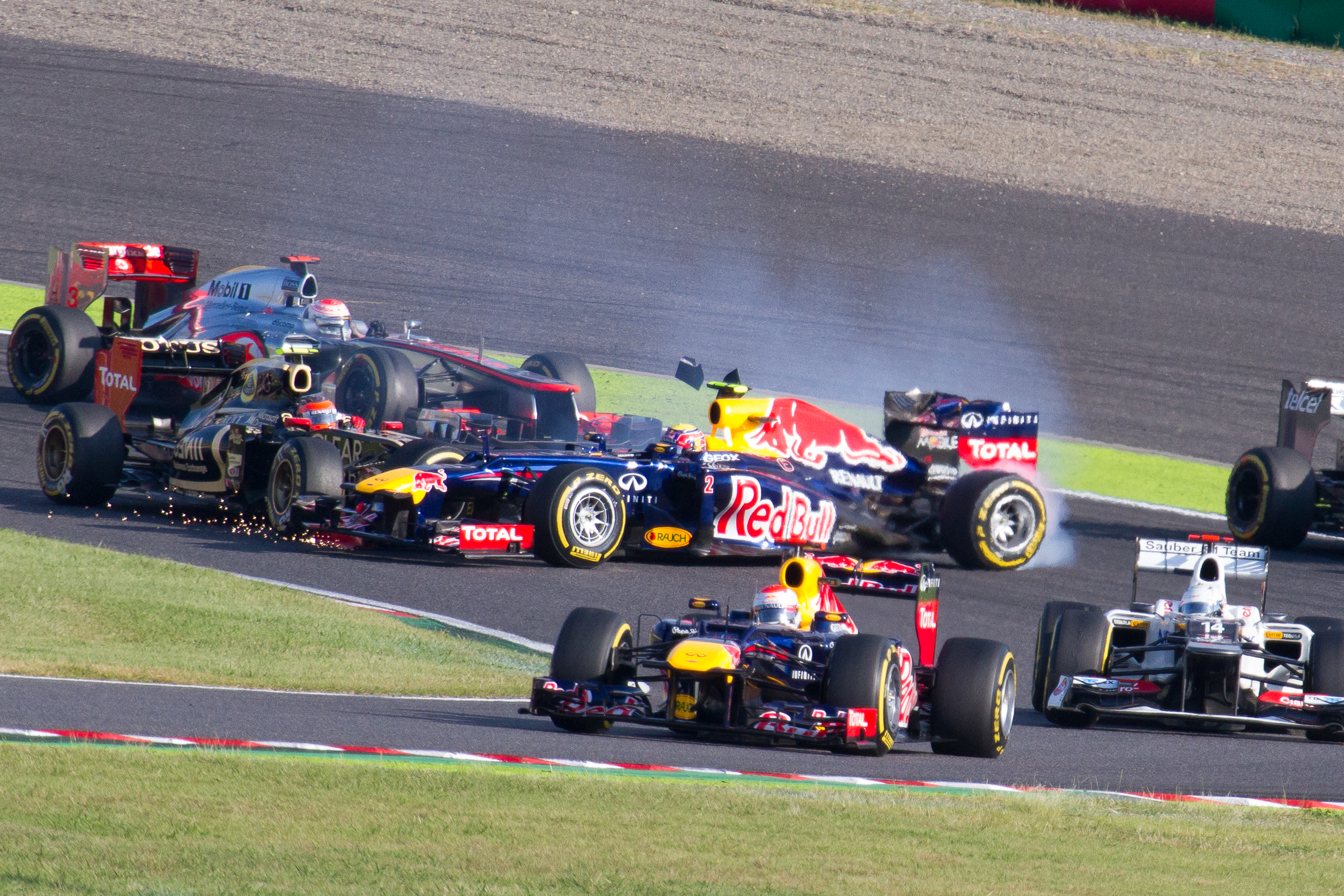
Romain Grosjean (left) was criticised for his role in causing another first-lap incident, this time spinning Mark Webber around at the start of the race.

Fernando Alonso was the victim of a dramatic first corner clash, spinning out when he made contact with Kimi Räikkönen and paving the way for his championship rivals to make considerable inroads into his twenty-nine-point championship lead. Mark Webber was also caught up in the opening lap melee when he was hit by Romain Grosjean; Webber was forced to pit straight away, while Grosjean was given a ten-second stop-go penalty for causing yet another first lap incident. Bruno Senna also ran afoul of the stewards, hitting Nico Rosberg whilst trying to avoid Grosjean and Webber and earning a drive-through penalty for his troubles while Rosberg retired on the spot. Sergio Pérez added his name to the growing list of early retirements when he slid off at the hairpin under brakes and into the gravel trap whilst trying to force his way past a struggling Lewis Hamilton. Sebastian Vettel won the race from pole position, having led every lap of the race and setting the fastest lap time in the process to complete his second Grand Chelem. Felipe Massa finished second, his first podium result since the 2010 Korean Grand Prix, whilst Kamui Kobayashi claimed the first podium of his career – and the first podium for a Japanese driver at the Suzuka Circuit since Aguri Suzuki finished third in 1990 – after withstanding late pressure from Jenson Button.

With Alonso retiring and Vettel taking a full twenty-five points for victory, the championship fight became as close as it had been all season long.

"It's five races to go, it will be like a mini championship, because we start with the same points and we need to score one more point [than Vettel] in five races. So we will try to do it."

— Championship leader Fernando Alonso when asked how he will win the World Drivers' Championship after Sebastian Vettel cut his lead to just four points after the Japanese Grand Prix.

=== Round 16 – Korea International Circuit ===
Sebastian Vettel's momentum continued one week later in Korea, winning his third consecutive race and taking a six-point championship lead as Fernando Alonso finished third. Vettel overcame pole-sitter Mark Webber at the start, and was aided in building up a lead by first-lap contact between Jenson Button, Nico Rosberg and Kamui Kobayashi that saw Button and Rosberg retire with damage from the collision; Rosberg pulled over on the approach to the third turn, forcing a protracted yellow flag period as marshalls attempted to retrieve his car. With the sporting regulations banning overtaking while yellow flags were shown, the field was effectively thinned out in the opening laps as drivers were unable to pass one another. Tyre management became the focus of the race, as drivers reported heavy graining, particularly on the right-front tyre, which bore most of the load over a lap of the circuit. Vettel ignored six radio calls from his pit wall cautioning him that a tyre failure was imminent, only backing off just enough in the final few laps to secure victory over Webber by six seconds. The team later denied that there had ever been a problem with Vettel's tyres. Further down the order, Scuderia Toro Rosso's Jean-Éric Vergne and Daniel Ricciardo fought their way from sixteenth and twenty-first on the grid to finish eighth and ninth, while Romain Grosjean drove a conservative race to finish seventh, having been warned beforehand by the stewards that another first-lap altercation would likely result in his disqualification from the race. Lewis Hamilton's day went from bad to worse when an anti-roll bar on his McLaren failed, while the car handled its tyres so poorly that he was forced to make an unscheduled stop in order to make it to the finish, only to tear up a length of astroturf that wreaked havoc on his downforce and he slid down to tenth place, narrowly fending off an opportunistic charge from Sergio Pérez to take the final World Championship point on offer. Button's retirement and Hamilton's single point meant that McLaren lost second place in the World Constructors' Championship to Ferrari, and Hamilton admitted that his bid to be the 2012 World Drivers' Champion was over.

=== Round 17 – India Buddh International Circuit ===
Ferrari's strategy for staying in the championship battle saw them introduce upgrades to the F2012 at every remaining race in the season, starting with an extensive revision for the Indian Grand Prix, but whatever advantage they offered was still not enough for Fernando Alonso to catch Sebastian Vettel. Vettel dominated the weekend, setting the fastest time in every practice session before qualifying on pole, and leading every lap of the sixty-lap race, though he was denied his third Grand Chelem when Jenson Button set the fastest lap of the race on the final lap. Fernando Alonso finished second, conceding another seven championship points to Vettel. The Ferrari driver rounded up both McLaren drivers at the start of the race and proceeded to chase down Mark Webber for second, only overtaking the Australian on the long back straight when his car developed a KERS fault fifteen laps from the end that it never recovered from. Webber held off a late challenge from Lewis Hamilton to complete the podium. Further down the order, Kimi Räikkönen finished seventh after spending most of the race trapped behind Felipe Massa, and later claimed that mistakes on Saturday had robbed him of a podium on Sunday, while Pedro de la Rosa retired from the race when he suffered a brake failure that saw him spin into the barriers at Turn 4. The race was marked by a series of explosive punctures after cars made light contact with one another; Michael Schumacher's right-rear tyre deflated on the first lap when he made contact with Jean-Éric Vergne at the first corner; Sergio Pérez suffered a puncture under similar circumstances when he glanced Daniel Ricciardo's front wing, with the loose rubber damaging the floor of Pérez's car enough that he was forced into retirement; and Pastor Maldonado also had a tyre punctured when he and Kamui Kobayashi touched at speed on the approach to Turn 5, forcing the Venezuelan to run wide onto the tarmac run-off, but suffering no lasting damage.

=== Round 18 – Abu Dhabi Yas Marina Circuit ===
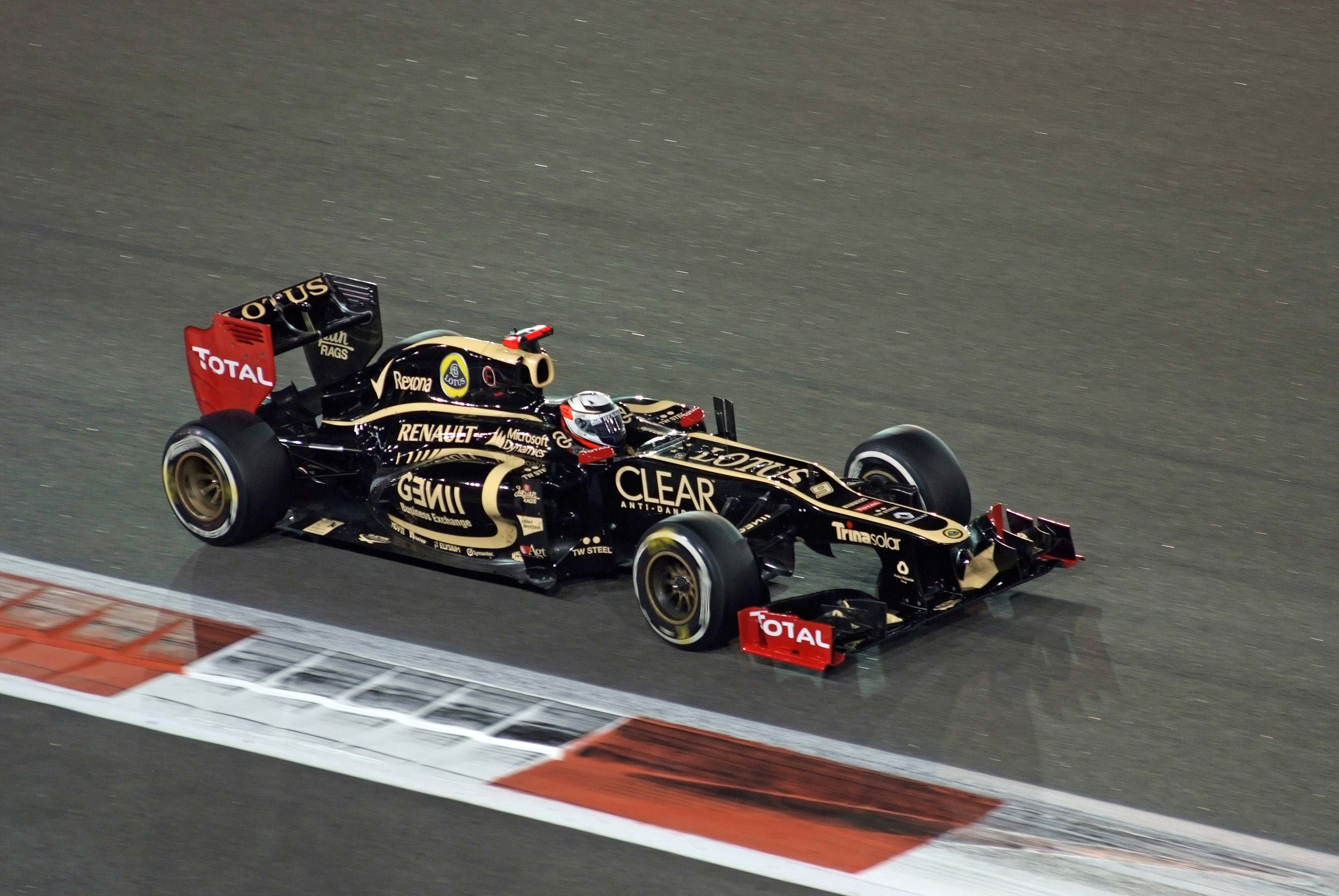
Kimi Räikkönen took Lotus's only victory of the 2012 season in Abu Dhabi after he inherited the lead following Lewis Hamilton's retirement from the race.

Sebastian Vettel's dominant run was derailed in Abu Dhabi when his car was found to have insufficient fuel after qualifying and he was subsequently moved to the back of the grid. As Lewis Hamilton led the race away from the start, Vettel started from pit lane and took advantage of a chaotic opening corner that saw Nico Hülkenberg, Paul di Resta, Romain Grosjean and Bruno Senna tangle; Hülkenberg was forced out, while di Resta and Grosjean pitted with damage. Vettel began to round up the HRTs, Marussias and Caterhams, but his early progress came at the expense of his front wing endplate when he made contact with Senna at Turn 8 switchback. He chose not to pit for the time being, as the race was interrupted by the intervention of the safety car. Nico Rosberg, who had been forced to pit with damage to his front wing, was in the process of overtaking Narain Karthikeyan as Karthikeyan's car began to fail and the Indian quickly slowed. Rosberg, caught unawares by Karthikeyan's troubles, was launched over the back of the HRT and into the barrier. During the safety car period, Vettel was forced to pit when he swerved to avoid Daniel Ricciardo and crashed into the polystyrene bollard marking the start of the DRS zone, further damaging his wing. Red Bull Racing took the opportunity to pit him early, with the downside being that Vettel would have to do 42 laps on the soft tyre when supplier Pirelli predicted they could only do 36. Meanwhile, Hamilton suffered another mechanical failure while leading the race, and was once again forced out, handing the lead to Kimi Räikkönen while Fernando Alonso inherited second. Vettel began to work his way through the field again, but was forced to make a second stop when his tyres started losing grip. He was saved by the second appearance of the safety car moments later, brought about when di Resta forced Sergio Pérez wide; as Pérez rejoined the circuit, he cut back across the front of Grosjean and the two made contact, which in turn forced Grosjean into the path of Mark Webber. Grosjean and Webber retired, whilst Pérez was given a stop-go penalty. When racing resumed, Räikkönen began to rebuild his lead over Alonso, who was being harried by Jenson Button; Button himself was being harried by Vettel in fourth. Button and Vettel's duel allowed Alonso to break free, and he started chasing down Räikkönen in the last five laps. Räikkönen held on to secure his – and Lotus F1's – only victory of the season. Alonso was second, while Vettel caught and passed Button to complete the podium, keeping a ten-point championship lead in the process. With both Alonso and Vettel finishing on the podium with him, Räikkönen's win was not enough to keep him in contention for the World Drivers' Championship, leaving the title to be fought out between Alonso and Vettel over the final two races of the season.

=== Round 19 – United States COTA ===
Despite its troubled construction period, the Circuit of the Americas passed its final FIA inspection on 25 September, allowing the race to go ahead. Sebastian Vettel took his sixth pole position of the season, whilst Alonso struggled throughout qualifying to start the race ninth, which became eighth when Romain Grosjean received a grid penalty for an unscheduled gearbox change. Amid concerns that drivers starting from even-numbered grid slots would suffer from a lack of grip as they were located off the racing line, Ferrari deliberately broke the seal on Felipe Massa's gearbox, thereby giving him a five-place grid penalty and promoting Alonso to seventh and the clean side of the grid. Ferrari's fears were not without merit as the drivers starting from even-number spaces fell behind at the start of the race. Vettel quickly converted pole position into a steady race lead as Lewis Hamilton fought to regain second place from Mark Webber. Moments after Hamilton caught him on lap 17, the Australian suffered yet another alternator problem, and coasted to a halt. Red Bull Racing team principal Christian Horner later admitted that the team's perpetual alternator problems were a serious concern with just one race left in the championship, a World Championship at stake and very little time to diagnose and correct the problem. With Webber now out of the running, Hamilton then turned his attentions on Vettel and steadily closed the gap to the lead, overtaking the World Championship leader on lap 42 when Vettel got caught behind Narain Karthikeyan in the meandering first sector, which allowed Hamilton to pass Vettel along the long back straight. Hamilton held onto the lead for the final fourteen laps, but with Vettel never more than a second and a half behind him, Hamilton could not afford to relax, and he won the race by just six-tenths of a second. Alonso recovered from seventh to finish third – marking the first time that he, Hamilton and Vettel had stood on the podium together in the one hundred races all three had contested together – and forcing the title fight to extend to the final round in Brazil. Further down the order, Massa overcame his gearbox penalty to finish fourth, while Jenson Button fell from twelfth on the grid to sixteenth at the end of the first lap, using an alternative strategy to claw his way back up to fifth. Michael Schumacher, on the other hand, went backwards; after qualifying fifth, his Mercedes chewed through its tyres, forcing him to make a second stop that sent him plummeting down the order to finish sixteenth, and a clutch problem during his stop deprived Kimi Räikkönen of the chance to compete with Alonso for the final podium place. Both Marussia drivers out-qualified the Caterhams for the first time, only for Timo Glock and Charles Pic be out-raced by Heikki Kovalainen and Vitaly Petrov, but the Russian team held onto tenth place in the World Constructors' Championship. Despite losing Webber to an alternator failure, Red Bull collected enough points to secure their third consecutive World Constructors' Championship title.

=== Round 20 – Brazil Autódromo José Carlos Pace (Interlagos) ===
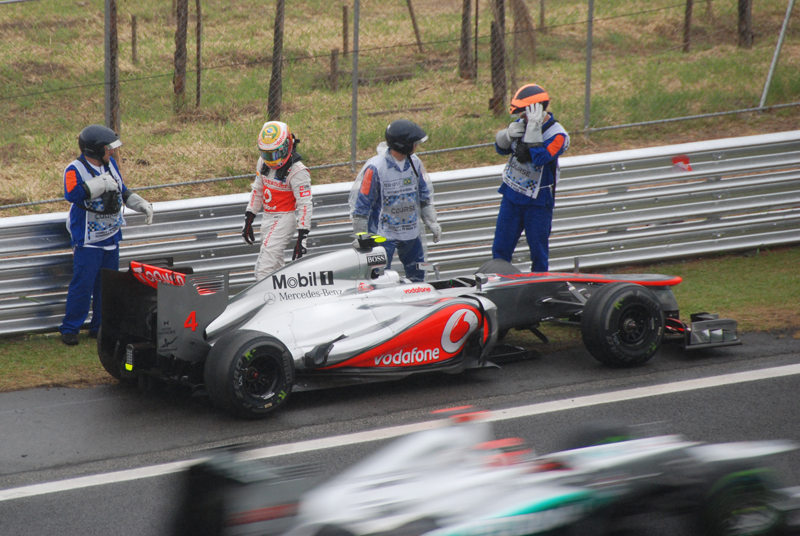
Lewis Hamilton retiring from the Brazilian Grand Prix, ending his McLaren career, before moving to Mercedes.

Championship leader table
Grand Prix	Championship leader	Lead
Australia	(United Kingdom) Jenson Button	7
Malaysia	(Spain) Fernando Alonso	5
China	(United Kingdom) Lewis Hamilton	2
Bahrain	(Germany) Sebastian Vettel	4
Spain	(Germany) Sebastian Vettel	0
Monaco	(Spain) Fernando Alonso	3
Canada	(United Kingdom) Lewis Hamilton	2
(Spain) Europe	(Spain) Fernando Alonso	20
(United Kingdom) Great Britain	(Spain) Fernando Alonso	13
Germany	(Spain) Fernando Alonso	34
Hungary	(Spain) Fernando Alonso	40
Belgium	(Spain) Fernando Alonso	24
Italy	(Spain) Fernando Alonso	37
Singapore	(Spain) Fernando Alonso	29
Japan	(Spain) Fernando Alonso	4
(South Korea) Korea	(Germany) Sebastian Vettel	6
India	(Germany) Sebastian Vettel	13
(United Arab Emirates) Abu Dhabi	(Germany) Sebastian Vettel	10
United States	(Germany) Sebastian Vettel	13
Brazil	(Germany) Sebastian Vettel	3

The final race of the season was run in conditions that were never quite wet enough for drivers to use wet tyres, but never quite dry enough for slick tyres to provide enough grip. While Jenson Button and Lewis Hamilton fought over the race lead, Sebastian Vettel was involved in a first-lap clash with Bruno Senna that damaged his exhaust and spun him around, relegating him to last place. Senna retired on the spot, as did Sergio Pérez, who was caught in the crossfire. The race was one of attrition, with Pastor Maldonado and Romain Grosjean also crashing out early. Button seized the lead from Hamilton, but soon found himself under pressure from Nico Hülkenberg and lost the lead to the German driver on lap 18, and second place to Hamilton shortly thereafter. The field stabilised themselves after the first round of stops, with Vettel in the lower points and Fernando Alonso running fourth when he needed a podium to stand any chance of being champion. Hülkenberg spun on lap 48 and lost the lead to Hamilton, but caught the McLaren on lap 54 as they encountered lapped traffic. The two made contact in the first corner, forcing Hamilton out of the race and earning Hülkenberg a drive-through penalty for causing an avoidable accident. In the wake of their collision, Button re-took the lead and held on to the end of the race. Meanwhile, the rain intensified, prompting teams to scramble for tyres. Hülkenberg's penalty and Hamilton's retirement promoted Alonso to the podium, which became second place when team-mate Felipe Massa yielded for him. A slow stop for Vettel relegated him to twelfth and swinging the balance of power in Alonso's favour. In the last ten laps of the race, Vettel began to make his way back up the order until he was seventh, just enough to secure the title, but leaving him vulnerable if the damage he received on the first lap – which by now had left a long crack running along the floor of his car – got worse. Vettel's seventh became sixth when Michael Schumacher moved aside to let Vettel through. Two laps from the end of the race, Paul di Resta crashed heavily as he came onto the main straight, forcing the deployment of the safety car. Button won the race, with Alonso second and Massa third, but Vettel's sixth place was enough to secure his third consecutive World Drivers' Championship. Kimi Räikkönen finished the season third overall, having benefited from Hamilton's retirement to hold onto the place following a bizarre incident in which he left the circuit and attempted to rejoin by taking to the support paddock pit lane, only to find the way blocked and forcing him to double back and find another way onto the circuit. In his final race in Formula One, Schumacher's seventh place saw him finish the season in thirteenth place overall; his worst performance over a season since he contested six rounds during the 1991 season. In the World Constructors' Championship, Ferrari secured second place from McLaren with two cars on the podium, while Kamui Kobayashi's ninth place was not enough for Sauber to take fifth from Mercedes, and Marussia lost tenth place to Caterham when Vitaly Petrov secured the team's best result of the season with eleventh place. Nikolai Fomenko, Marussia's director of engineering, later claimed that Charles Pic had deliberately let Petrov through, as Pic had announced his move to Caterham for the 2013 season two days before the race.

=== Post-season controversy ===
Three days after the Brazilian Grand Prix, reports began to surface suggesting that Sebastian Vettel's championship was under threat and that Ferrari would be filing a formal protest against the race results. The challenge centred on a pass Vettel made on Jean-Éric Vergne early in the race. At the time, the first sector of the circuit was under yellow flag conditions following the spin and retirement of Pastor Maldonado at Curva do Sol, the Interlagos circuit's third corner, which feeds onto the back straight. Vettel overtook Vergne along the straight, which led to claims that the pass was illegal because of the yellow flags. Intense media speculation suggested that the challenge threatened Vettel's championship because as the race finished behind the safety car, any post-race penalty had the potential to demote him in the race standings, and Vettel would not have enough points to secure the title. Ferrari wrote to the FIA, requesting clarification on the matter. The FIA reviewed the incident and declared that Vettel's pass was legal as a green flag was being shown by a marshal adjacent to the pit exit, meaning the track was green from that point onward; the confusion had been caused by a digital board showing a yellow flag on the exit of Curva do Sol some one hundred metres before the marshalling post. Both Ferrari and Red Bull Racing announced that they were satisfied with the ruling, thereby preserving Vettel's championship.

== Results and standings ==
=== Grands Prix ===
Round	Grand Prix	Pole position	Fastest lap	Winning driver	Winning constructor	Report
1	(Australia) Australian Grand Prix	(United Kingdom) Lewis Hamilton	(United Kingdom) Jenson Button	(United Kingdom) Jenson Button	(United Kingdom) McLaren-Mercedes	Report
2	(Malaysia) Malaysian Grand Prix	(United Kingdom) Lewis Hamilton	(Finland) Kimi Räikkönen	(Spain) Fernando Alonso	(Italy) Ferrari	Report
3	(China) Chinese Grand Prix	(Germany) Nico Rosberg	(Japan) Kamui Kobayashi	(Germany) Nico Rosberg	(Germany) Mercedes	Report
4	Bahrain Grand Prix	(Germany) Sebastian Vettel	(Germany) Sebastian Vettel	(Germany) Sebastian Vettel	(Austria) Red Bull-Renault	Report
5	(Spain) Spanish Grand Prix	(Venezuela) Pastor Maldonado (Note: Lewis Hamilton was excluded from pole position at the Spanish Grand Prix for a technical infringement and moved to the back of the grid. Pastor Maldonado was recognised as the pole-sitter for the race.)	(France) Romain Grosjean	(Venezuela) Pastor Maldonado	(United Kingdom) Williams-Renault	Report
6	Monaco Grand Prix	(Australia) Mark Webber (Note: Michael Schumacher set the fastest time in qualifying for the Monaco Grand Prix, but received a five-place grid penalty for causing a collision with Bruno Senna in the previous race. Mark Webber was promoted to pole position in his place.)	(Mexico) Sergio Pérez	(Australia) Mark Webber	(Austria) Red Bull-Renault	Report
7	(Canada) Canadian Grand Prix	(Germany) Sebastian Vettel	(Germany) Sebastian Vettel	(United Kingdom) Lewis Hamilton	(United Kingdom) McLaren-Mercedes	Report
8	(Spain) European Grand Prix	(Germany) Sebastian Vettel	(Germany) Nico Rosberg	(Spain) Fernando Alonso	(Italy) Ferrari	Report
9	(United Kingdom) British Grand Prix	(Spain) Fernando Alonso	(Finland) Kimi Räikkönen	(Australia) Mark Webber	(Austria) Red Bull-Renault	Report
10	(Germany) German Grand Prix	(Spain) Fernando Alonso	(Germany) Michael Schumacher	(Spain) Fernando Alonso	(Italy) Ferrari	Report
11	(Hungary) Hungarian Grand Prix	(United Kingdom) Lewis Hamilton	(Germany) Sebastian Vettel	(United Kingdom) Lewis Hamilton	(United Kingdom) McLaren-Mercedes	Report
12	(Belgium) Belgian Grand Prix	(United Kingdom) Jenson Button	(Brazil) Bruno Senna	(United Kingdom) Jenson Button	(United Kingdom) McLaren-Mercedes	Report
13	(Italy) Italian Grand Prix	(United Kingdom) Lewis Hamilton	(Germany) Nico Rosberg	(United Kingdom) Lewis Hamilton	(United Kingdom) McLaren-Mercedes	Report
14	Singapore Grand Prix	(United Kingdom) Lewis Hamilton	(Germany) Nico Hülkenberg	(Germany) Sebastian Vettel	(Austria) Red Bull-Renault	Report
15	(Japan) Japanese Grand Prix	(Germany) Sebastian Vettel	(Germany) Sebastian Vettel	(Germany) Sebastian Vettel	(Austria) Red Bull-Renault	Report
16	(South Korea) Korean Grand Prix	(Australia) Mark Webber	(Australia) Mark Webber	(Germany) Sebastian Vettel	(Austria) Red Bull-Renault	Report
17	(India) Indian Grand Prix	(Germany) Sebastian Vettel	(United Kingdom) Jenson Button	(Germany) Sebastian Vettel	(Austria) Red Bull-Renault	Report
18	(United Arab Emirates) Abu Dhabi Grand Prix	(United Kingdom) Lewis Hamilton	(Germany) Sebastian Vettel	(Finland) Kimi Räikkönen	(United Kingdom) Lotus-Renault	Report
19	United States Grand Prix	(Germany) Sebastian Vettel	(Germany) Sebastian Vettel	(United Kingdom) Lewis Hamilton	(United Kingdom) McLaren-Mercedes	Report
20	(Brazil) Brazilian Grand Prix	(United Kingdom) Lewis Hamilton	(United Kingdom) Lewis Hamilton	(United Kingdom) Jenson Button	(United Kingdom) McLaren-Mercedes	Report

=== Scoring system ===
Points were awarded to the top 10 classified finishers.

Position	1st	2nd	3rd	4th	5th	6th	7th	8th	9th	10th
Points	25	18	15	12	10	8	6	4	2	1

=== World Drivers' Championship standings ===
Pos.	Driver	AUS (Australia)	MAL (Malaysia)	CHN (China)	BHR (Bahrain)	ESP (Spain)	MON (Monaco)	CAN (Canada)	EUR (Spain)	GBR (United Kingdom)	GER (Germany)	HUN (Hungary)	BEL (Belgium)	ITA (Italy)	SIN (Singapore)	JPN (Japan)	KOR (South Korea)	IND (India)	ABU (United Arab Emirates)	USA (United States)	BRA (Brazil)	Points
1	(Germany) Sebastian Vettel	2	11	5	1^{P}^{F}	6	4	4^{P}^{F}	Ret^{P}	3	5	4^{F}	2	22^{†}	1	1^{P}^{F}	1	1^{P}	3^{F}	2^{P}^{F}	6	281
2	(Spain) Fernando Alonso	5	1	9	7	2	3	5	1	2^{P}	1^{P}	5	Ret	3	3	Ret	3	2	2	3	2	278
3	(Finland) Kimi Räikkönen	7	5^{F}	14	2	3	9	8	2	5^{F}	3	2	3	5	6	6	5	7	1	6	10	207
4	(United Kingdom) Lewis Hamilton	3^{P}	3^{P}	3	8	8	5	1	19^{†}	8	Ret	1^{P}	Ret	1^{P}	Ret^{P}	5	10	4	Ret^{P}	1	Ret^{P}^{F}	190
5	(United Kingdom) Jenson Button	1^{F}	14	2	18^{†}	9	16^{†}	16	8	10	2	6	1^{P}	Ret	2	4	Ret	5^{F}	4	5	1	188
6	(Australia) Mark Webber	4	4	4	4	11	1^{P}	7	4	1	8	8	6	20^{†}	11	9	2^{P}^{F}	3	Ret	Ret	4	179
7	(Brazil) Felipe Massa	Ret	15	13	9	15	6	10	16	4	12	9	5	4	8	2	4	6	7	4	3	122
8	(France) Romain Grosjean	Ret	Ret	6	3	4^{F}	Ret	2	Ret	6	18	3	Ret		7	19^{†}	7	9	Ret	7	Ret	96
9	(Germany) Nico Rosberg	12	13	1^{P}	5	7	2	6	6^{F}	15	10	10	11	7^{F}	5	Ret	Ret	11	Ret	13	15	93
10	(Mexico) Sergio Pérez	8	2	11	11	Ret	11^{F}	3	9	Ret	6	14	Ret	2	10	Ret	11	Ret	15	11	Ret	66
11	(Germany) Nico Hülkenberg	Ret	9	15	12	10	8	12	5	12	9	11	4	21^{†}	14^{F}	7	6	8	Ret	8	5	63
12	(Japan) Kamui Kobayashi	6	Ret	10^{F}	13	5	Ret	9	Ret	11	4	18^{†}	13	9	13	3	Ret	14	6	14	9	60
13	(Germany) Michael Schumacher	Ret	10	Ret	10	Ret	Ret	Ret	3	7	7^{F}	Ret	7	6	Ret	11	13	22^{†}	11	16	7	49
14	(United Kingdom) Paul di Resta	10	7	12	6	14	7	11	7	Ret	11	12	10	8	4	12	12	12	9	15	19^{†}	46
15	(Venezuela) Pastor Maldonado	13^{†}	19^{†}	8	Ret	1^{P}	Ret	13	12	16	15	13	Ret	11	Ret	8	14	16	5	9	Ret	45
16	(Brazil) Bruno Senna	16^{†}	6	7	22^{†}	Ret	10	17	10	9	17	7	12^{F}	10	18^{†}	14	15	10	8	10	Ret	31
17	(France) Jean-Éric Vergne	11	8	16	14	12	12	15	Ret	14	14	16	8	Ret	Ret	13	8	15	12	Ret	8	16
18	(Australia) Daniel Ricciardo	9	12	17	15	13	Ret	14	11	13	13	15	9	12	9	10	9	13	10	12	13	10
19	(Russia) Vitaly Petrov	Ret	16	18	16	17	Ret	19	13	DNS	16	19	14	15	19	17	16	17	16	17	11	0
20	(Germany) Timo Glock	14	17	19	19	18	14	Ret	DNS	18	22	21	15	17	12	16	18	20	14	19	16	0
21	(France) Charles Pic	15^{†}	20	20	Ret	Ret	Ret	20	15	19	20	20	16	16	16	Ret	19	19	Ret	20	12	0
22	(Finland) Heikki Kovalainen	Ret	18	23	17	16	13	18	14	17	19	17	17	14	15	15	17	18	13	18	14	0
23	(Belgium) Jérôme d'Ambrosio													13								0
24	(India) Narain Karthikeyan	DNQ	22	22	21	Ret	15	Ret	18	21	23	Ret	Ret	19	Ret	Ret	20	21	Ret	22	18	0
25	(Spain) Pedro de la Rosa	DNQ	21	21	20	19	Ret	Ret	17	20	21	22	18	18	17	18	Ret	Ret	17	21	17	0
Pos.	Driver	AUS (Australia)	MAL (Malaysia)	CHN (China)	BHR (Bahrain)	ESP (Spain)	MON (Monaco)	CAN (Canada)	EUR (Spain)	GBR (United Kingdom)	GER (Germany)	HUN (Hungary)	BEL (Belgium)	ITA (Italy)	SIN (Singapore)	JPN (Japan)	KOR (South Korea)	IND (India)	ABU (United Arab Emirates)	USA (United States)	BRA (Brazil)	Points

Key
Colour	Result
Gold	Winner
Silver	Second place
Bronze	Third place
Green	Other points position
Blue	Other classified position
Blue	Not classified, finished (NC)
Purple	Not classified, retired (Ret)
Red	Did not qualify (DNQ)
Black	Disqualified (DSQ)
White	Did not start (DNS)
White	Race cancelled (C)
Blank	Did not practice (DNP)
Blank	Excluded (EX)
Blank	Did not arrive (DNA)
Blank	Withdrawn (WD)
Blank	Did not enter (empty cell)
Annotation	Meaning
P	Pole position
F	Fastest lap

Notes:

- † – Drivers did not finish the Grand Prix, but were classified as they completed more than 90% of the race distance.

=== World Constructors' Championship standings ===
Pos.	Constructor	No.	AUS (Australia)	MAL (Malaysia)	CHN (China)	BHR (Bahrain)	ESP (Spain)	MON (Monaco)	CAN (Canada)	EUR (Spain)	GBR (United Kingdom)	GER (Germany)	HUN (Hungary)	BEL (Belgium)	ITA (Italy)	SIN (Singapore)	JPN (Japan)	KOR (South Korea)	IND (India)	ABU (United Arab Emirates)	USA (United States)	BRA (Brazil)	Points
1	(Austria) Red Bull-Renault	1	2	11	5	1^{P}^{F}	6	4	4^{P}^{F}	Ret^{P}	3	5	4^{F}	2	22^{†}	1	1^{P}^{F}	1	1^{P}	3^{F}	2^{P}^{F}	6	460
1	(Austria) Red Bull-Renault	2	4	4	4	4	11	1^{P}	7	4	1	8	8	6	20^{†}	11	9	2^{P}^{F}	3	Ret	Ret	4	460
2	(Italy) Ferrari	5	5	1	9	7	2	3	5	1	2^{P}	1^{P}	5	Ret	3	3	Ret	3	2	2	3	2	400
2	(Italy) Ferrari	6	Ret	15	13	9	15	6	10	16	4	12	9	5	4	8	2	4	6	7	4	3	400
3	(United Kingdom) McLaren-Mercedes	3	1^{F}	14	2	18^{†}	9	16^{†}	16	8	10	2	6	1^{P}	Ret	2	4	Ret	5^{F}	4	5	1	378
3	(United Kingdom) McLaren-Mercedes	4	3^{P}	3^{P}	3	8	8	5	1	19^{†}	8	Ret	1^{P}	Ret	1^{P}	Ret^{P}	5	10	4	Ret^{P}	1	Ret^{P}^{F}	378
4	(United Kingdom) Lotus-Renault	9	7	5^{F}	14	2	3	9	8	2	5^{F}	3	2	3	5	6	6	5	7	1	6	10	303
4	(United Kingdom) Lotus-Renault	10	Ret	Ret	6	3	4^{F}	Ret	2	Ret	6	18	3	Ret	13	7	19^{†}	7	9	Ret	7	Ret	303
5	(Germany) Mercedes	7	Ret	10	Ret	10	Ret	Ret	Ret	3	7	7^{F}	Ret	7	6	Ret	11	13	22^{†}	11	16	7	142
5	(Germany) Mercedes	8	12	13	1^{P}	5	7	2	6	6^{F}	15	10	10	11	7^{F}	5	Ret	Ret	11	Ret	13	15	142
6	(Switzerland) Sauber-Ferrari	14	6	Ret	10^{F}	13	5	Ret	9	Ret	11	4	18^{†}	13	9	13	3	Ret	14	6	14	9	126
6	(Switzerland) Sauber-Ferrari	15	8	2	11	11	Ret	11^{F}	3	9	Ret	6	14	Ret	2	10	Ret	11	Ret	15	11	Ret	126
7	Force India-Mercedes	11	10	7	12	6	14	7	11	7	Ret	11	12	10	8	4	12	12	12	9	15	19^{†}	109
7	Force India-Mercedes	12	Ret	9	15	12	10	8	12	5	12	9	11	4	21^{†}	14^{F}	7	6	8	Ret	8	5	109
8	(United Kingdom) Williams-Renault	18	13^{†}	19^{†}	8	Ret	1^{P}	Ret	13	12	16	15	13	Ret	11	Ret	8	14	16	5	9	Ret	76
8	(United Kingdom) Williams-Renault	19	16^{†}	6	7	22^{†}	Ret	10	17	10	9	17	7	12^{F}	10	18^{†}	14	15	10	8	10	Ret	76
9	(Italy) Toro Rosso-Ferrari	16	9	12	17	15	13	Ret	14	11	13	13	15	9	12	9	10	9	13	10	12	13	26
9	(Italy) Toro Rosso-Ferrari	17	11	8	16	14	12	12	15	Ret	14	14	16	8	Ret	Ret	13	8	15	12	Ret	8	26
10	(Malaysia) Caterham-Renault	20	Ret	18	23	17	16	13	18	14	17	19	17	17	14	15	15	17	18	13	18	14	0
10	(Malaysia) Caterham-Renault	21	Ret	16	18	16	17	Ret	19	13	DNS	16	19	14	15	19	17	16	17	16	17	11	0
11	(Russia) Marussia-Cosworth	24	14	17	19	19	18	14	Ret	DNS	18	22	21	15	17	12	16	18	20	14	19	16	0
11	(Russia) Marussia-Cosworth	25	15^{†}	20	20	Ret	Ret	Ret	20	15	19	20	20	16	16	16	Ret	19	19	Ret	20	12	0
12	(Spain) HRT-Cosworth	22	DNQ	21	21	20	19	Ret	Ret	17	20	21	22	18	18	17	18	Ret	Ret	17	21	17	0
12	(Spain) HRT-Cosworth	23	DNQ	22	22	21	Ret	15	Ret	18	21	23	Ret	Ret	19	Ret	Ret	20	21	Ret	22	18	0
Pos.	Constructor	No.	AUS (Australia)	MAL (Malaysia)	CHN (China)	BHR (Bahrain)	ESP (Spain)	MON (Monaco)	CAN (Canada)	EUR (Spain)	GBR (United Kingdom)	GER (Germany)	HUN (Hungary)	BEL (Belgium)	ITA (Italy)	SIN (Singapore)	JPN (Japan)	KOR (South Korea)	IND (India)	ABU (United Arab Emirates)	USA (United States)	BRA (Brazil)	Points

Key
Colour	Result
Gold	Winner
Silver	Second place
Bronze	Third place
Green	Other points position
Blue	Other classified position
Blue	Not classified, finished (NC)
Purple	Not classified, retired (Ret)
Red	Did not qualify (DNQ)
Black	Disqualified (DSQ)
White	Did not start (DNS)
White	Race cancelled (C)
Blank	Did not practice (DNP)
Blank	Excluded (EX)
Blank	Did not arrive (DNA)
Blank	Withdrawn (WD)
Blank	Did not enter (empty cell)
Annotation	Meaning
P	Pole position
F	Fastest lap

Notes:

- † – Drivers did not finish the Grand Prix, but were classified as they completed more than 90% of the race distance.
- Official FIA results for the Constructors' Championship identified the constructors as "Red Bull Racing", "Scuderia Ferrari", "Vodafone McLaren Mercedes", etc.
