= Red Bull RB10 =

2014 Formula One racing car

- Sebastian Vettel driving the RB10 in the Chinese Grand Prix
- Category: Formula One
- Constructor: Red Bull
- Designers: Adrian Newey (Chief Technical Officer); Rob Marshall (Chief Designer); Pierre Waché (Chief Engineer, Performance); Giles Wood (Chief Engineer, Simulation and Analysis); Steve Winstanley (Deputy Chief Designer, Composites and Structures); David Worner (Deputy Chief Designer, Mechanics and Suspension); Rob Gray (Head of R&D); Peter Prodromou (Chief Engineer, Aerodynamics); Dan Fallows (Chief Aerodynamicist); Rob White (Managing Director - Renault); Naoki Tokunaga (Technical Director - Renault)
- Predecessor: Red Bull RB9
- Successor: Red Bull RB11

Technical specifications
- Chassis: Composite monocoque structure, designed and built in-house, carrying the Renault V6 as fully stressed member.
- Suspension (front): Aluminium alloy uprights, carbon-composite double wishbone with springs and anti-roll bar, Multimatic dampers.
- Suspension (rear): Same as front
- Length: 5,070 mm (200 in; 17 ft)
- Width: 1,800 mm (71 in; 6 ft)
- Height: 950 mm (37 in; 3 ft)
- Axle track: Front: 1,470 mm (58 in); Rear: 1,405 mm (55 in)
- Wheelbase: 3,150 mm (124 in; 10 ft)
- Engine: Renault Energy F1-2014 1.6 L (98 cu in) V6 (90°). Turbo, 15,000 rpm mid-mounted.
- Transmission: Red Bull Technology; 8-speed, longitudinally mounted with hydraulic system for power shift and clutch operation. semi-automatic
- Power: 760 hp
- Weight: 691 kg (1,523 lb)
- Fuel: Total Excellium 94.25% 102 RON unleaded gasoline + 5.75% biofuel
- Lubricants: Total Quartz 9000 5W10
- Brakes: Brembo calipers. Friction material; carbon/carbon composites discs and pads
- Tyres: Pirelli P Zero (dry), Cinturato (wet); O.Z. Racing wheels, Front: 12.0in x 13in diam., Rear: 13.7in x 13in diam.

Competition history
- Notable entrants: Infiniti Red Bull Racing
- Notable drivers: 1. (Germany) Sebastian Vettel; 3. (Australia) Daniel Ricciardo
- Debut: 2014 Australian Grand Prix
- First win: 2014 Canadian Grand Prix
- Last win: 2014 Belgian Grand Prix
- Last event: 2014 Abu Dhabi Grand Prix
Races	Wins	Podiums	Poles	F/Laps
19	3	12	0	3

The Red Bull RB10 is a Formula One racing car designed by Adrian Newey for defending world champions Infiniti Red Bull Racing to compete in the 2014 Formula One season. It was driven by reigning World Drivers' Champion Sebastian Vettel and Daniel Ricciardo, who was promoted from junior team Scuderia Toro Rosso after Mark Webber announced his retirement from the sport at the end of the 2013 season. The RB10 was designed to use Renault Sport's new 1.6-litre V6 turbocharged engine, the Renault Energy F1-2014.

The car was launched on 28 January 2014 at the Circuito de Jerez. Keeping with the tradition of naming his race cars, world champion, Sebastian Vettel named the RB10 as "Suzie".

== Design and development ==
The early stages of the RB10's development were seriously limited by several recurring issues, with the team managing less than 100 kilometres (62 miles) of running during the first test in Jerez de la Frontera, less than any other team which attended the test. The team—like fellow Renault-powered outfits Scuderia Toro Rosso and Caterham—were affected first by problems with the physical Renault Energy F1-2014 unit that prevented the individual components of the power unit from working together. Once these issues were resolved, the team experienced problems with the software governing the turbo unit. Red Bull also suffered from unique problems arising from the tight packaging of the RB10 chassis, which caused temperatures within the car to climb so high that parts started to burn.

The team's problems continued during the second test at the Bahrain International Circuit, where they were forced to run with the Energy Recovery System (ERS) disabled on Renault's advice, robbing the RB10 of up to 150 horsepower (112 kW). Although Sebastian Vettel was able to complete over seventy laps of the circuit on the first of four days of testing, the team completed less than forty more over the remaining three days as the chassis was further plagued by mechanical issues. As the test ended, Red Bull had completed fewer laps than any other team save for Lotus and Marussia, and the fastest times recorded by Vettel and Daniel Ricciardo were outside 107% of the fastest time recorded during the test; had the test been treated as a qualifying session, neither Vettel nor Ricciardo would have qualified for a race.

The final test of the season—also held in Bahrain—was little better; although Ricciardo recorded the car's fastest lap time, it was still two and a half seconds slower than the fastest lap time recorded by Felipe Massa. When Vettel returned to the car, he failed to complete a lap before the car broke down, and team principal Christian Horner admitted the team had no idea when the problems with the car would be fixed.

== Season summary ==
The start of the season was unfortunate for Red Bull, with MGU-K problems causing Vettel to retire in the opening laps of the Australian Grand Prix. A first ever podium for Ricciardo was stripped due to illegal fuel flow throughout the race. Despite warnings from officials throughout the race, Red Bull used their own fuel flow system rather than the mandated FIA item, claiming the FIA unit was faulty.

Vettel was able to achieve third place in Malaysia, though a botched pit stop and front wing damage forced Ricciardo to retire from the race. Ricciardo and Vettel would both go on to finish in the points at the Bahrain Grand Prix, finishing fourth and sixth, respectively. They would repeat this feat once more at the Chinese Grand Prix, with Ricciardo finishing fourth again, and Vettel behind him in fifth. The form of the RB10 improved at the Spanish Grand Prix, where Ricciardo achieved a third-place finish, and Vettel finished fourth, also ending Mercedes's streak of setting the fastest laps of every race. Ricciardo repeated a third place podium finish in Monaco, managing to hound Lewis Hamilton in a battle for second after the latter had problems with his vision. Conversely, Vettel retired early on due to power unit issues.

The RB10 took its first win of the 2014 season when Ricciardo won the seventh race of the season, in Canada. The win was also Ricciardo's first in Formula One, while Vettel was also able to record his second podium finish of the season, finishing in third place. Red Bull were not able to repeat a great result at its home race in Austria, with Ricciardo finishing in eighth, and Vettel retiring for the third time, falling behind due to a power unit glitch, and later retiring due to front wing damage. Ricciardo and Vettel bounced back to place third and fifth, respectively in Britain.

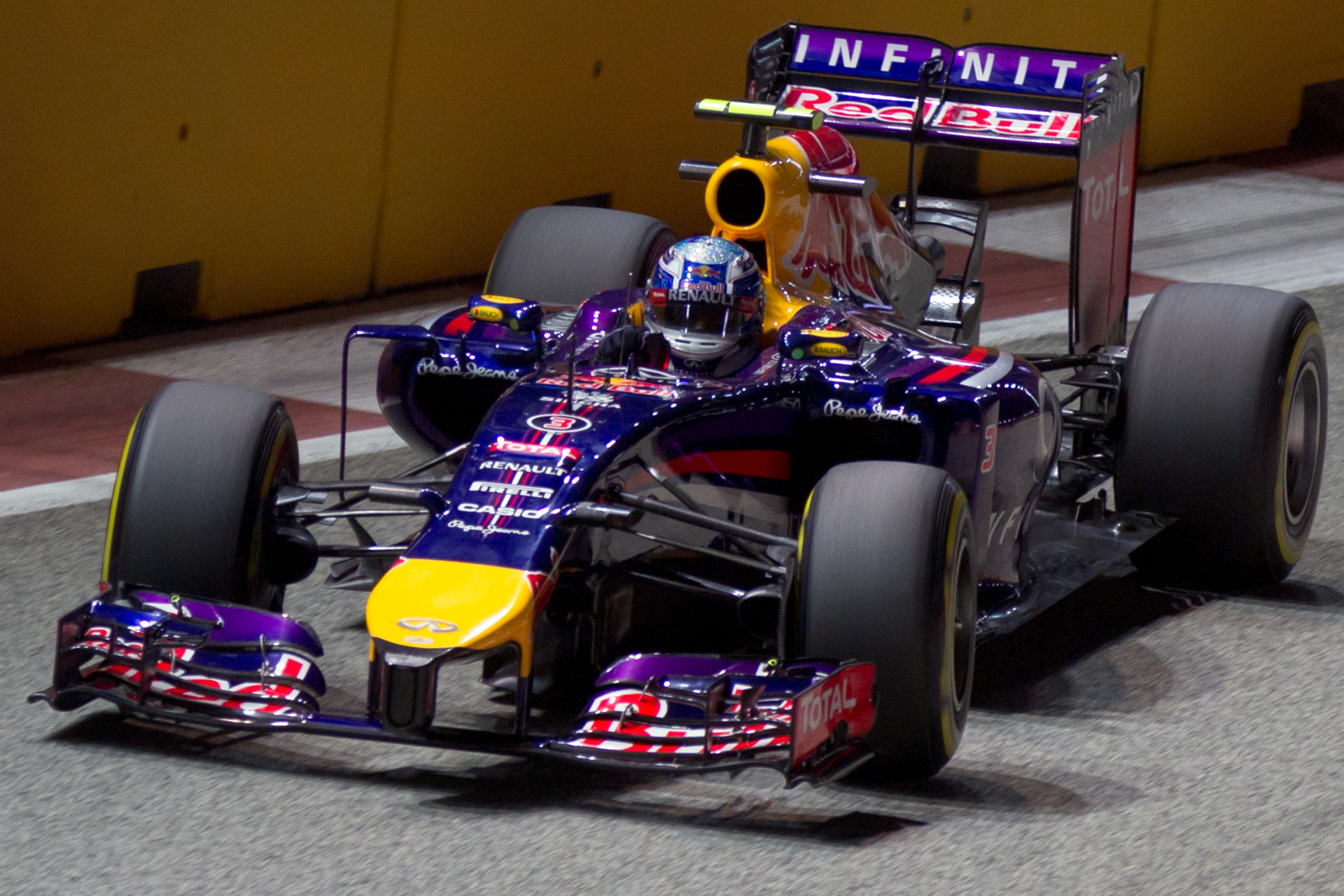
Daniel Ricciardo during the FP2 of the Singapore Grand Prix

Ricciardo gave the RB10 its second and third wins at the Hungarian and the Belgian Grands Prix respectively. The team finished second in the Constructors' Championship, with Ricciardo finishing third in the Drivers' Championship, beating Vettel, who finished fifth, the defending champion unable to notch a single race victory or pole position.

At the final race of the season in Abu Dhabi, the Red Bulls were excluded from qualifying for having a front wing which was over the wing flex limits. As a result, the Red Bull cars were sent to the back of the grid. The team was, however, able to claw back a decent result with Daniel Ricciardo finishing fourth and the departing Sebastian Vettel finishing in eighth place.

== Display ==
As of September 2021, the RB10 driven by Daniel Ricciardo throughout the season was on display at The Motor Museum of Western Australia.

== Complete Formula One results ==
(key) (results in italics indicate fastest lap)

Year	Entrant	Engine	Tyres	Drivers	Grands Prix																			Points	WCC
Year	Entrant	Engine	Tyres	Drivers	AUS	MAL	BHR	CHN	ESP	MON	CAN	AUT	GBR	GER	HUN	BEL	ITA	SIN	JPN	RUS	USA	BRA	ABU‡	Points	WCC
2014	Red Bull Racing	Renault Energy; F1-2014 V6	P	(Germany) Sebastian Vettel	Ret	3	6	5	4	Ret	3	Ret	5	4	7	5	6	2	3	8	7	5	8	405	2nd
2014	Red Bull Racing	Renault Energy; F1-2014 V6	P	(Australia) Daniel Ricciardo	DSQ	Ret	4	4	3	3	1	8	3	6	1	1	5	3	4	7	3	Ret	4	405	2nd

‡ — Teams and drivers scored double points at the Abu Dhabi Grand Prix.
