= Red Bull RB7 =

2011 Formula One car

- Sebastian Vettel driving the RB7 at the Italian Grand Prix
- Category: Formula One
- Constructor: Red Bull
- Designers: Adrian Newey (Chief Technical Officer); Rob Marshall (Chief Designer); Mark Ellis (Chief Engineer, Performance); Giles Wood (Chief Engineer, Simulation and Analysis); Steve Winstanley (Deputy Chief Designer, Composites and Structures); David Worner (Deputy Chief Designer, Mechanics and Suspension); Rob Gray (Head of R&D); Peter Prodromou (Chief Engineer, Aerodynamics); Dan Fallows (Chief Aerodynamicist)
- Predecessor: Red Bull RB6
- Successor: Red Bull RB8

Technical specifications
- Chassis: carbon-fibre and honeycomb composite monocoque, designed and built in-house, carrying engine as fully stressed member
- Suspension (front): Aluminium alloy uprights, carbon-composite double wishbones with springs and anti-roll bar, push rod-actuated Multimatic dampers
- Suspension (rear): as front, except pull rod-actuated rear dampers
- Engine: Renault RS27-2011 2,400 cc (146.5 cu in) 90° V8, limited to 18,000 RPM with KERS naturally aspirated mid-mounted
- Transmission: Seven-speed semi-automatic gearbox with reverse gear Hydraulic system for power shift and clutch operation
- Power: >750 hp @ 18,000 rpm
- Weight: 640 kg (1,411 lb) (including driver)
- Fuel: Total
- Tyres: Pirelli P Zero; OZ Wheels (front and rear): 13"

Competition history
- Notable drivers: 1. (Germany) Sebastian Vettel; 2. (Australia) Mark Webber
- Debut: 2011 Australian Grand Prix
- First win: 2011 Australian Grand Prix
- Last win: 2011 Brazilian Grand Prix
- Last event: 2011 Brazilian Grand Prix
Races	Wins	Podiums	Poles	F/Laps
19	12	27	18	10
- Constructors' Championships: 1 (2011)
- Drivers' Championships: 1 (2011, Sebastian Vettel)

The Red Bull RB7 is a Formula One racing car designed by the Red Bull Racing team for the 2011 Formula One season. It was driven by defending champion Sebastian Vettel and Australian driver Mark Webber for the third year running. The highly competitive and reliable RB7 took 12 victories and 27 podiums as Red Bull took the Constructors' Championship and Vettel taking the Drivers' Championship title that year.

== Season summary ==
The car was launched at the Circuit Ricardo Tormo in Valencia, Spain on 1 February 2011. Sebastian Vettel was the first driver to test the car.

The car was fastest throughout Barcelona testing with Vettel at the wheel. It won the first race of the season at Melbourne with Vettel, whilst Webber finished fifth. In the nineteen races of the 2011 season, the RB7 only failed to finish in the top five twice, when Mark Webber crashed out of the Italian Grand Prix and when Sebastian Vettel retired from the Abu Dhabi Grand Prix.

Webber leaving the pit lane during Brazilian Grand Prix, in what would be his only victory of the year

Vettel used the RB7 to claim the 2011 World Drivers' Championship in Japan and Red Bull won the World Constructors' Championship the following weekend in South Korea. The car achieved three 1-2 finishes during the season. It is one of the most dominant Formula One cars ever built, winning 12 of the 19 races and claiming all but one pole position in the 2011 season, in part due to the innovative but controversial exhaust-blown diffuser.

Sebastian Vettel, who (since joining Scuderia Toro Rosso) makes a habit of naming his cars, named his RB7 chassis Kinky Kylie.

The RB7 was the first Red Bull car to assume Renault full-works team partnership status after the Renault F1 Team was rebranded to Lotus Renault GP and later Lotus F1 Team following Renault's sale of their 25 percent stake in the team to Lotus Cars in late 2010. The RB7 was also the first-ever KERS-equipped Formula One car to win the constructors' title.

== Sponsorship and livery ==
The livery is the team's traditional one, featuring blue and yellow colors and a large red bull on the engine cover. Starting this year, the sponsor Infiniti has been added; in the years to follow, it would come to occupy increasingly prominent spaces.

From the Hungarian Grand Prix onwards, the sponsor ServusTV appeared on the endplate of the car's rear wing. At the Japanese Grand Prix, the sponsor 7-Eleven appeared on the endplate of the car's bargeboards. At the Brazilian Grand Prix, the Brazilian telecommunications company Sky logo could be seen on the bargeboard of the cars.

== Later uses ==
Brendon Hartley driving the RB7 during the 2025 Adelaide 500

After the 2011 season, the RB7 was frequently used in demonstrations and rewrapped in different liveries throughout the years:

- On 15 March 2014 Daniel Ricciardo raced an RB7 against a Royal Australian Air Force (RAAF) F/A-18 Hornet, piloted by RAAF pilot Michael Keightley.
- On 14 January 2016, the RB7 was used by future Red Bull driver Max Verstappen to make a snow demonstration run at Kitzbühel.
- On 4 February 2023, the RB7 was used by New Zealand Formula 2 driver Liam Lawson to make a demonstration lap of the Mount Panorama race track in between practice and qualifying sessions for the 2023 Liqui Moly Bathurst 12 Hour.
- On 15 March 2025, the Brazilian city of Curitiba, Paraná staged a Red Bull Showrun with two RB7s. A Red Bull Racing-liveried example was driven by Patrick Friesacher, and a Racing Bulls-liveried example by Scott Speed. This event mobilized over 100,000 people to watch and was an absolute success.
- On 2 April 2025, these cars reappeared with the same liveries during the Red Bull Showrun x Powered by Honda event at Tokyo ahead of the Japanese Grand Prix.
- On 8 June 2025 the same cars participated in Red Bull Showrun Sofia and were driven by David Coulthard and Nikola Tsolov.
- On 26 July 2025, the Lithuanian city of Klaipėda organized the second Red Bull Showrun in Lithuania. The car was driven by Patrick Friesacher.
- On 13 September 2025, the car took part of the Red Bull Motormania in Magny-Cours in France. Two RB7s were driven by F1 driver Isack Hadjar and former F1 driver Sébastien Buemi. They notably demonstrated with former MotoGP rider Dani Pedrosa and multiple WRC champion Sébastien Loeb, each with their own machinery.
- On 27-30 November 2025, these cars participated in the Red Bull Demo Run where they did on track demonstrations for the Adelaide Grand Final at the Adelaide Street Circuit in Australia. Two RB7s were driven by Former F1 drivers David Coulthard, Scott Speed and Brendon Hartley.
- On 21 February 2026, one of the cars caught fire during the Red Bull Showrun in Marina Green San Francisco, while the Red Bull and Racing Bulls teams' reserve driver Yuki Tsunoda was doing demonstrations for the fans. Yuki was forced to jump out the RB7 by the fire.
- On 25 July 2026 (postponed from July 18 due to air quality concerns), these cars participated in the Red Bull Showrun, doing track demonstrations in Dearborn Michigan.

== Complete Formula One results ==
(key) (results in bold indicate pole position; results in italics indicate fastest lap)

Year	Entrant	Engine	Tyres	Drivers	1	2	3	4	5	6	7	8	9	10	11	12	13	14	15	16	17	18	19	Points	WCC
2011	Red Bull Racing	Renault RS27 V8	**P**		AUS	MAL	CHN	TUR	ESP	MON	CAN	EUR	GBR	GER	HUN	BEL	ITA	SIN	JPN	KOR	IND	ABU	BRA	**650**	**1st**
2011	Red Bull Racing	Renault RS27 V8	**P**	(Germany) Sebastian Vettel	**1**	**1**	**2**	**1**	1	**1**	**2**	**1**	2	4	**2**	**1**	**1**	**1**	**3**	1	**1**	**Ret**	**2**	**650**	**1st**
2011	Red Bull Racing	Renault RS27 V8	**P**	(Australia) Mark Webber	5	4	3	2	**4**	4	3	3	**3**	**3**	5	2	Ret	3	4	3	4	4	1	**650**	**1st**

Awards
Preceded by Red Bull RB6	Autosport; Racing Car Of The Year; 2011	Succeeded by Red Bull RB8
