= Red Bull RB11 =

2015 Formula One racing car

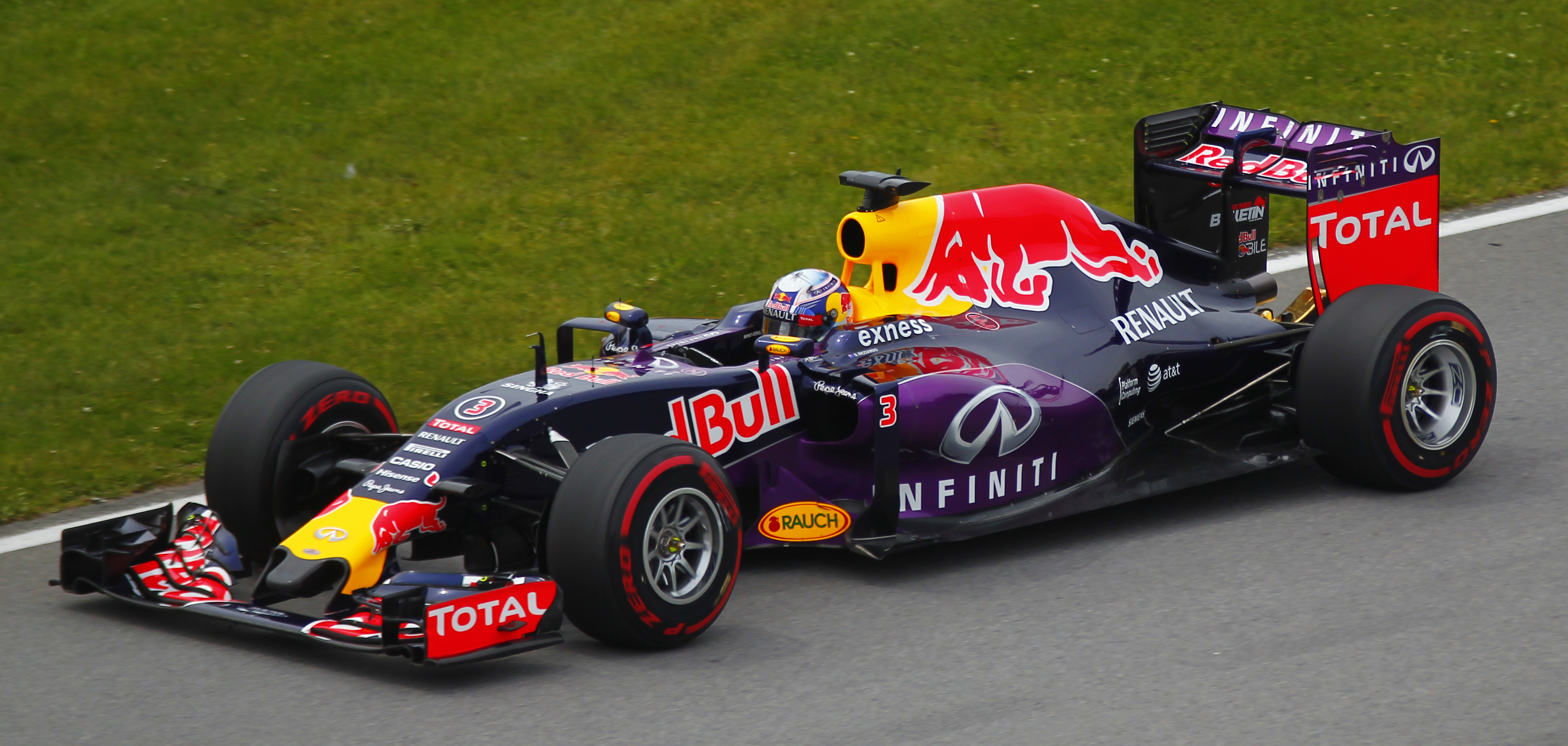
- Daniel Ricciardo driving the RB11 at the Canadian Grand Prix
- Category: Formula One
- Constructor: Red Bull
- Designers: Adrian Newey (Chief Technical Officer); Rob Marshall (Chief Engineering Officer); Rob Gray (Chief Designer); Steve Winstanley (Deputy Chief Designer, Composites and Structures); David Worner (Deputy Chief Designer, Mechanics and Suspension); Pierre Waché (Chief Engineer, Performance); Dan Fallows (Head of Aerodynamics); Craig Skinner (Deputy Head of Aerodynamics); Stefano Sordo (Head of Aerodynamic Performance); Rob White (Managing Director - Renault); Naoki Tokunaga (Technical Director - Renault)
- Predecessor: Red Bull RB10
- Successor: Red Bull RB12

Technical specifications
- Chassis: Composite monocoque structure, designed and built in-house, carrying the Renault V6 as fully stressed member.
- Suspension (front): Aluminium alloy uprights, carbon-composite double wishbone with springs and anti-roll bar, Multimatic dampers
- Suspension (rear): Same as front
- Length: 5,070 mm (200 in; 17 ft)
- Width: 1,800 mm (71 in; 6 ft)
- Height: 950 mm (37 in; 3 ft)
- Axle track: Front: 1,470 mm (58 in); Rear: 1,405 mm (55 in)
- Wheelbase: 3,150 mm (124 in; 10 ft)
- Engine: Renault Energy F1-2015 1.6 L (98 cu in) V6 (90°). turbo, 15,000 RPM mid-mounted.
- Transmission: Red Bull Technology Semi-automatic eight-speed gearbox, longitudinally mounted with hydraulic system for power shift and clutch operation
- Power: 850 hp
- Weight: 702 kg (1,548 lb)
- Fuel: Total Excellium
- Lubricants: Total Quartz 9000
- Brakes: Brembo calipers
- Tyres: Pirelli P Zero (dry), Cinturato (wet); O.Z. Racing wheel rims, Front: 12.0in x 13in diam., Rear: 13.7in x 13in diam.

Competition history
- Notable entrants: Infiniti Red Bull Racing
- Notable drivers: 3. (Australia) Daniel Ricciardo; 26. (Russia) Daniil Kvyat
- Debut: 2015 Australian Grand Prix
- Last event: 2015 Abu Dhabi Grand Prix
Races	Wins	Podiums	Poles	F/Laps
19	0	3	0	3

The Red Bull RB11 is a Formula One racing car designed by Adrian Newey for Infiniti Red Bull Racing to compete in the 2015 Formula One season. It was driven by Daniel Ricciardo and Daniil Kvyat. This was the last Red Bull car with engines originally badged as "Renault" and to feature their title sponsor Infiniti as they split from Red Bull at the end of the season due to a breakdown in the team's relationship with Renault.

After good results in previous seasons, 2015 was not a successful season for Red Bull. This was mainly due to the Renault engine lacking performance and reliability, compared to the Mercedes and Ferrari power units. They were also unable to compete with Mercedes as they did in 2014, and also lost out to Ferrari and Williams, finishing fourth overall in the Constructors' Championship. The team suffered their first winless season since 2008 and their last as of the end of 2025, with the best results being 2nd for Kvyat in Hungary and Ricciardo in Singapore.

== Season summary ==
The RB11 was launched on 1 February 2015. During pre-season testing, the car ran a camouflage livery – akin to pre-production cars – before the team reverted to their normal livery for the race season.

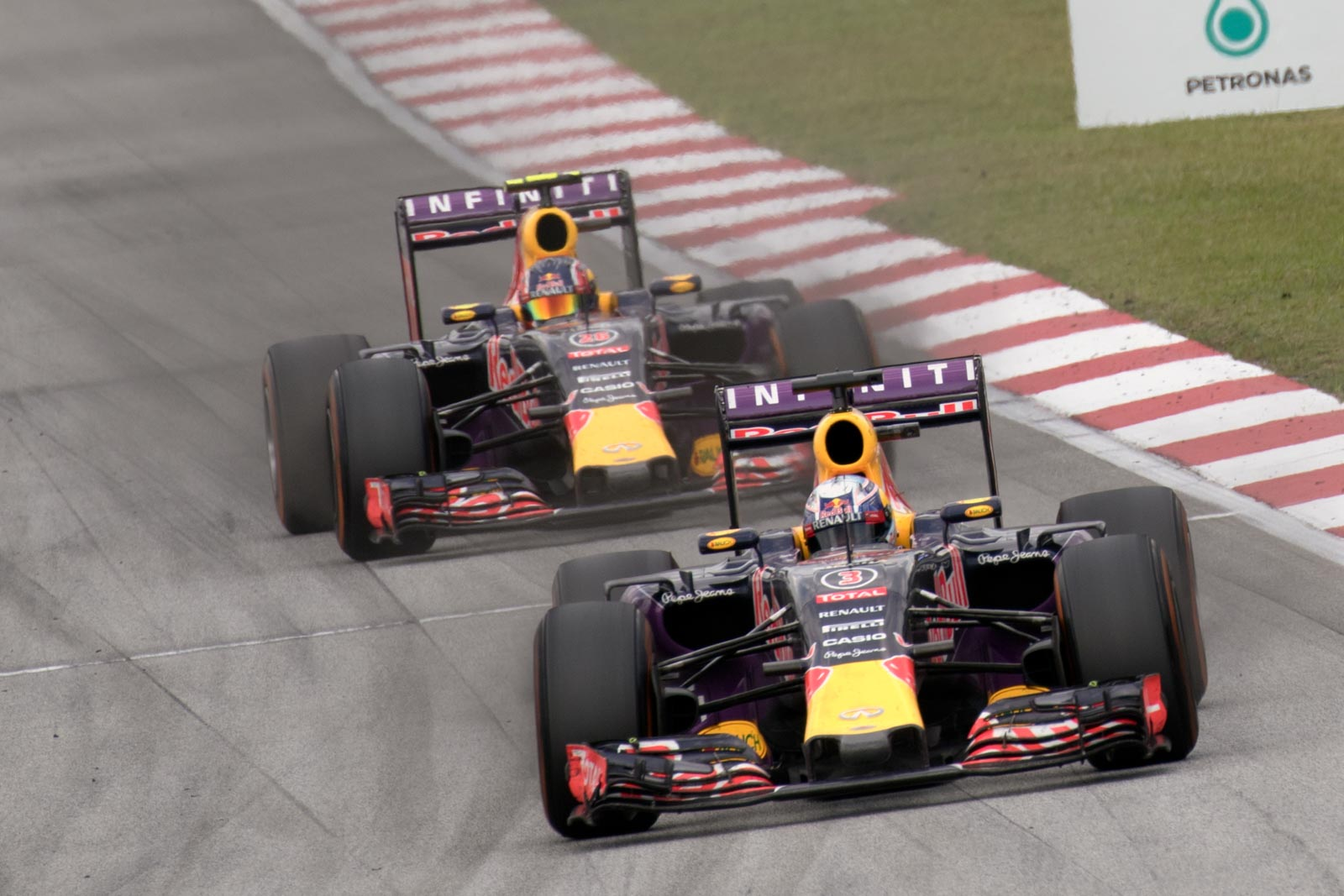
Ricciardo leads teammate Kvyat at the Malaysian Grand Prix

Red Bull had a terrible start to the 2015 Formula One season with a lack of performance from its Renault power unit compounded by reliability problems. Red Bull and Renault both stated that they seemed to have 'moved backwards' in performance terms from the previous year. After the first four races, Red Bull still continued to struggle for reliability and performance, only scoring 23 points, the team's worst start since the 2008 Formula One season. Red Bull faced more problems at the Bahrain Grand Prix, as Daniel Ricciardo's Renault V6 engine gave up as he exited the final corner on the last lap, thus forcing him to move onto his fourth power unit at the Spanish Grand Prix. Under the current regulations, drivers are permitted to use only four engines per season.

Renault countered with their own threat to pull out of Formula One as an engine supplier if its reputation continued to be damaged or was otherwise not profitable to the company. Red Bull had targeted the Spanish Grand Prix where it would make a step forward on performance due to multiple aerodynamic upgrades, but in the end no results had come thus far as both drivers still finished a lap down on Mercedes and Ferrari. Renault quoted that past glories may have led to present woes with both Red Bull and Renault struggling with power unit reliability and aerodynamic upgrades. Ultimately, the team slumped to 4th place in the Constructors' Championship, with no wins for the first time since 2008. The team's best place was 2nd place each for Kvyat at Hungary and Ricciardo at Singapore on the tracks which suited more to the aerodynamics of the car rather than outright speed. Overall, the chassis proved to be at most on par with the dominant Mercedes team, but the engine proved to be a letdown to the car's performance.

== Sponsorship and livery ==
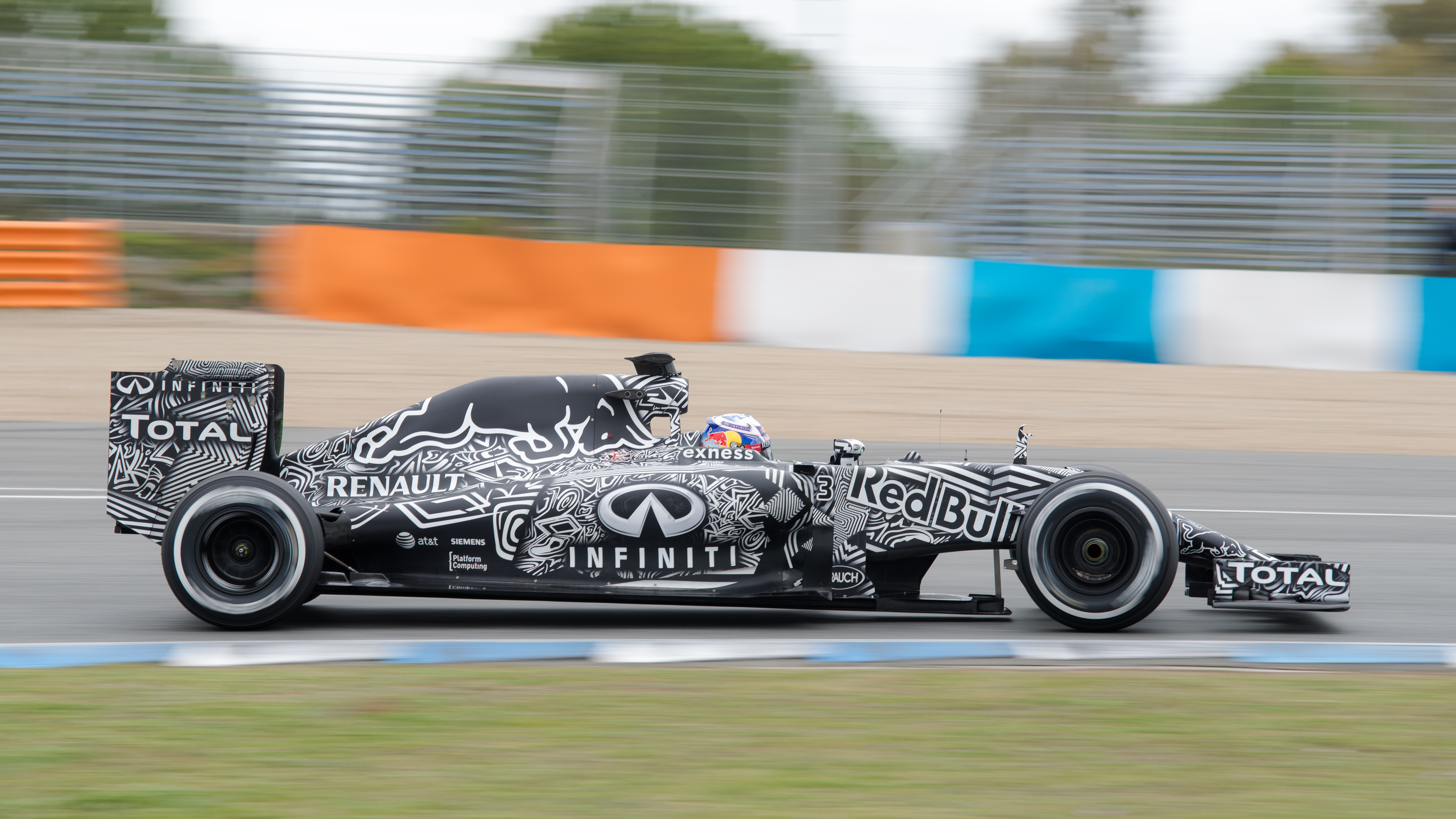
The RB11 in its distinctive camouflage testing livery

In the shakedown held at the beginning of February 2015 on the Jerez de la Frontera circuit, the RB11 did not take to the track in the traditional blue colour of the Red Bull team but with a special black and white "zebra" livery which earned it the nickname CamoBull, designed to camouflage the shapes and technical details of the bodywork from the eyes of the competition.

The final livery, officially presented on March 2, does not differ from that seen on the previous Austrian single-seaters, but shows the novelty of a more marked use of purple (especially on the side panels and the cockpit) alongside the blue. The gray, red and blue stripes are eliminated. The Red Bull brand now stands out large on the sides of the cockpit with slightly inclined characters. The Exness sponsor makes its appearance on the sides of the cockpit.

== Complete Formula One results ==
(key) (results in bold indicate pole position; results in italics indicate fastest lap)

Year	Entrant	Engine	Tyres	Drivers	Grands Prix																			Points	WCC
Year	Entrant	Engine	Tyres	Drivers	AUS	MAL	CHN	BHR	ESP	MON	CAN	AUT	GBR	HUN	BEL	ITA	SIN	JPN	RUS	USA	MEX	BRA	ABU	Points	WCC
2015	Infiniti Red Bull Racing	Renault; Energy F1-2015	**P**	(Russia) Daniil Kvyat	DNS	9	Ret	9	10	4	9	12	6	2	4	10	6	13	5	Ret	4	7	10	187	4th
2015	Infiniti Red Bull Racing	Renault; Energy F1-2015	**P**	(Australia) Daniel Ricciardo	6	10	9	6	7	5	13	10	Ret	3	Ret	8	2	15	15†	10	5	11	6	187	4th

† Driver failed to finish the race, but was classified as they had completed greater than 90% of the race distance.
