= Red Bull RB3 =

Racing automobile

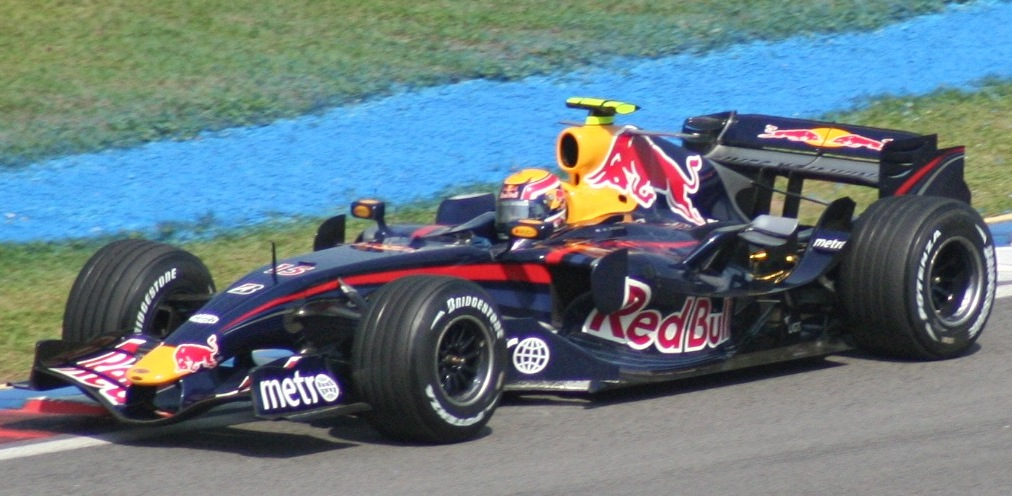
- Mark Webber driving the RB3 at the 2007 Malaysian Grand Prix
- Category: Formula One
- Constructor: Red Bull
- Designers: Adrian Newey (Chief Technical Officer); Mark Smith (Technical Director); Rob Marshall (Chief Designer); Andrew Green (Head of R&D); Peter Prodromou (Head of Aerodynamics); Dan Fallows (Chief Aerodynamicist)
- Predecessor: RB2
- Successor: RB4

Technical specifications
- Chassis: Carbon-fibre and honeycomb composite monocoque
- Suspension (front): Twin-keel double wishbone, pushrod activated torsion bar springing.
- Suspension (rear): Double wishbone, pushrod activated torsion bar springing.
- Engine: Renault RS27 2.4 L V8, naturally aspirated, mid-engine, longitudinally-mounted
- Transmission: Red Bull Technology 7-speed hydraulic power-shift
- Power: >750 hp @ 19,000 rpm
- Fuel: Elf
- Tyres: Bridgestone

Competition history
- Notable entrants: Red Bull Racing
- Notable drivers: 14. (United Kingdom) David Coulthard; 15. (Australia) Mark Webber
- Debut: 2007 Australian Grand Prix
- Last event: 2007 Brazilian Grand Prix
Races	Wins	Podiums	Poles	F/Laps
17	0	1	0	0
- Constructors' Championships: 0
- Drivers' Championships: 0

The Red Bull Racing RB3 is a Formula One racing car produced by Red Bull Racing for the 2007 season. It was the team's first Adrian Newey-designed car and used customer Renault RS27 engines, after the team's contract with Ferrari was transferred to the Toro Rosso team.

This was the first non-Enstone based Formula One car to use full works Renault engines since the Williams FW19 in 1997.

== Controversy ==
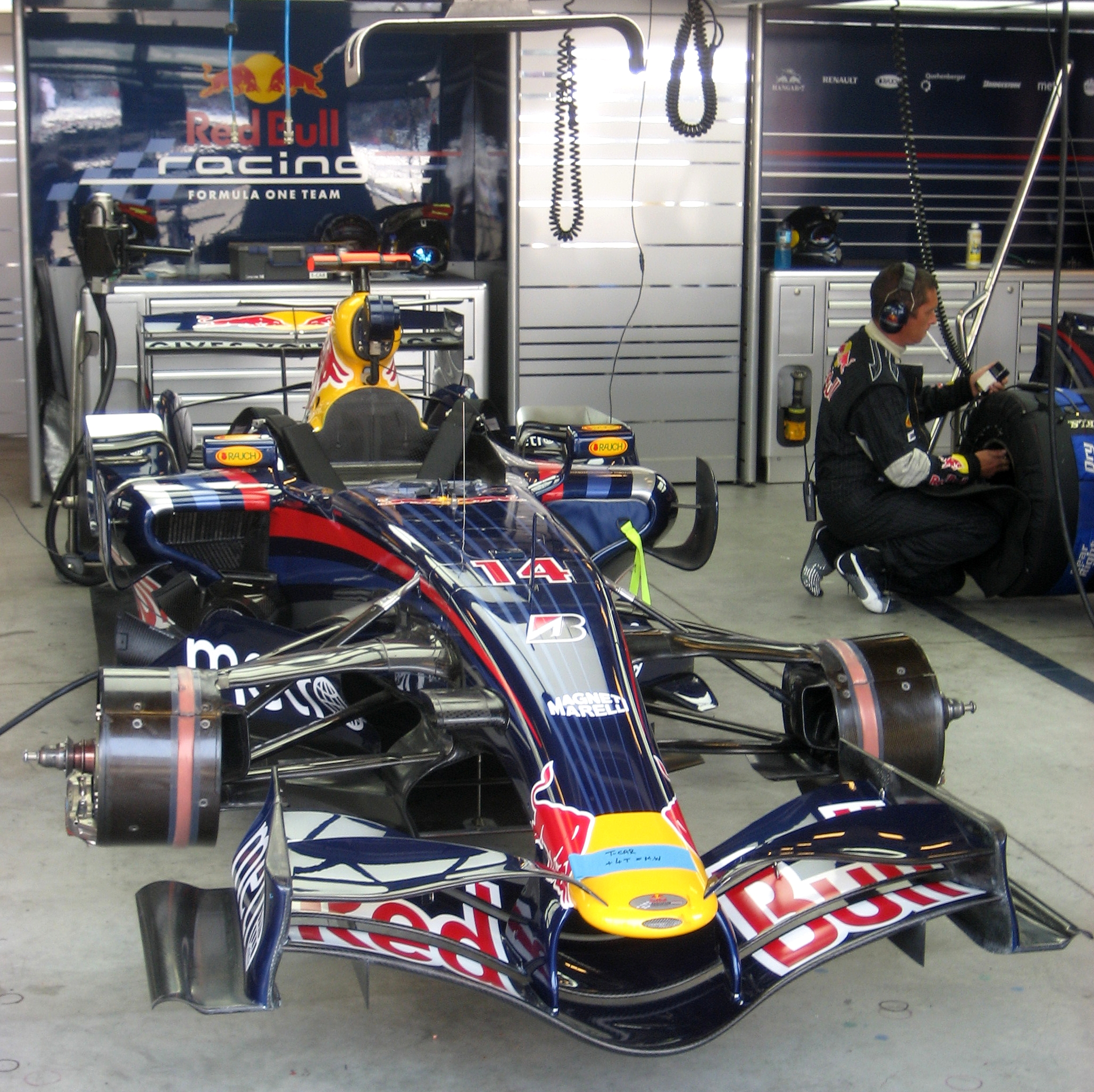
The RB3 of David Coulthard in the garage at the 2007 United States Grand Prix

Controversy surrounded the Red Bull and Toro Rosso teams during the 2007 launch season as a row over customer cars erupted. Both Williams and Spyker claimed that the cars of the two teams were identical, having been designed by Red Bull Technology, a third-party subsidiary of the Red Bull parent company. Thus, the teams themselves did not design their respective cars themselves, which Williams and Spyker believed was a breach of F1's Concorde Agreement. The FIA however declared that the cars were legal for 2007. Gerhard Berger, Christian Horner and other Toro Rosso and Red Bull Racing staff have also stated that they had their legal representatives confirm that the cars they were running were legal and that the operations they had set up (two teams running the same chassis, designed by Red Bull Technology) were legal.

== Performance ==
The car, in the hands of both Mark Webber and David Coulthard, is seen to have point-scoring pace, highlighted by Webber's series of top-ten qualifying positions and Coulthard running fastest in the pre-race Barcelona testing. The design is distinctly Adrian Newey, bearing a resemblance to past cars such as the 2005 McLaren MP4-20. However, like the McLaren, poor reliability and mechanical problems have hampered the drivers on numerous occasions. Problems included things as trivial as faulty brake pedals and notoriously jamming fuel-flaps. However, the most pressing reliability issue was the introduction of a seamless-shift gearbox to the car, which resulted in numerous race retirements for both Mark Webber and David Coulthard, such as at the Monaco and Canadian Grands Prix respectively.

Comments made throughout the season stated clearly that the car had much potential, despite David Coulthard's distaste of the word. Towards the middle of the season, after being frustrated by continuous retirements at the expense of championship points, team principal Christian Horner put into place a strict and thorough method to deal with and eradicate any mechanical unreliability, which along with the appointment of Geoff Willis (formerly of the Williams and BAR/Honda teams), was expected to provide better results in the 2008 season.

The car's best result was in the hands of Mark Webber, when he scored a podium in changeable conditions at the 2007 European Grand Prix. It scored points on only two other occasions for Webber, 7th in both the United States and Belgian Grand Prix, despite his consistent fast qualifying, starting in the top 11 on eleven occasions. Coulthard was more successful, scoring points at four races, including a 4th place at the Japanese Grand Prix, a race at which Mark Webber was running in second before he was hit from behind by Sebastian Vettel, driving Red Bull's sister Toro Rosso car, under the safety car, following a bunch up caused by race leader Lewis Hamilton.

== Sponsorship and livery ==
At the British Grand Prix, the RB3s sported a livery of fan-submitted images as part of a one-off event for the charity Wings for Life. More than 30,000 fans pledged money and uploaded images to the team's website, and each fan has selected a spot on either car to have their image placed. The goal was to raise €1 million.

At the Japanese Grand Prix, the sponsor 7-Eleven appeared on the endplate of the car's rear wing.

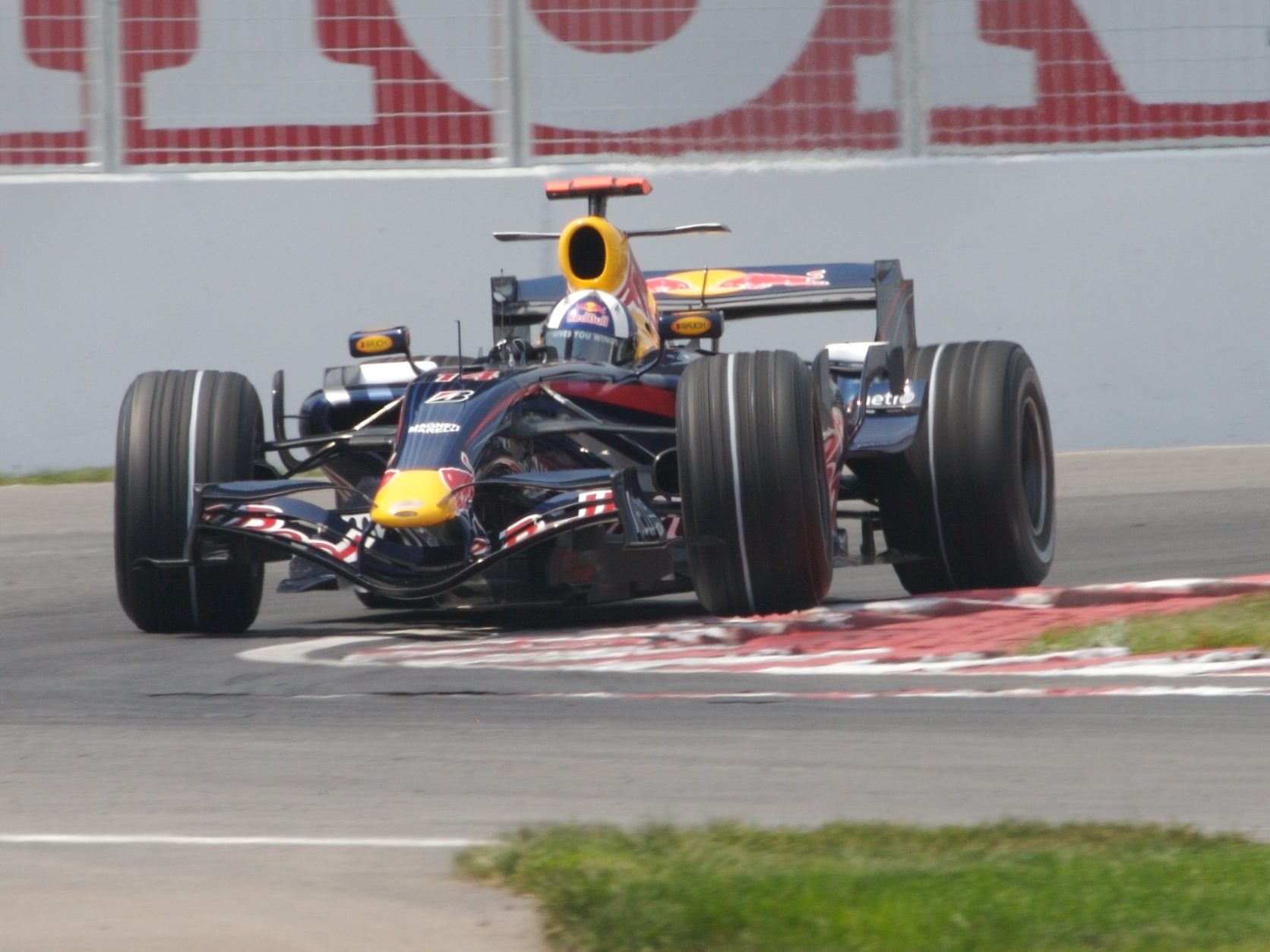
David Coulthard driving the RB3 at the 2007 Canadian Grand Prix.

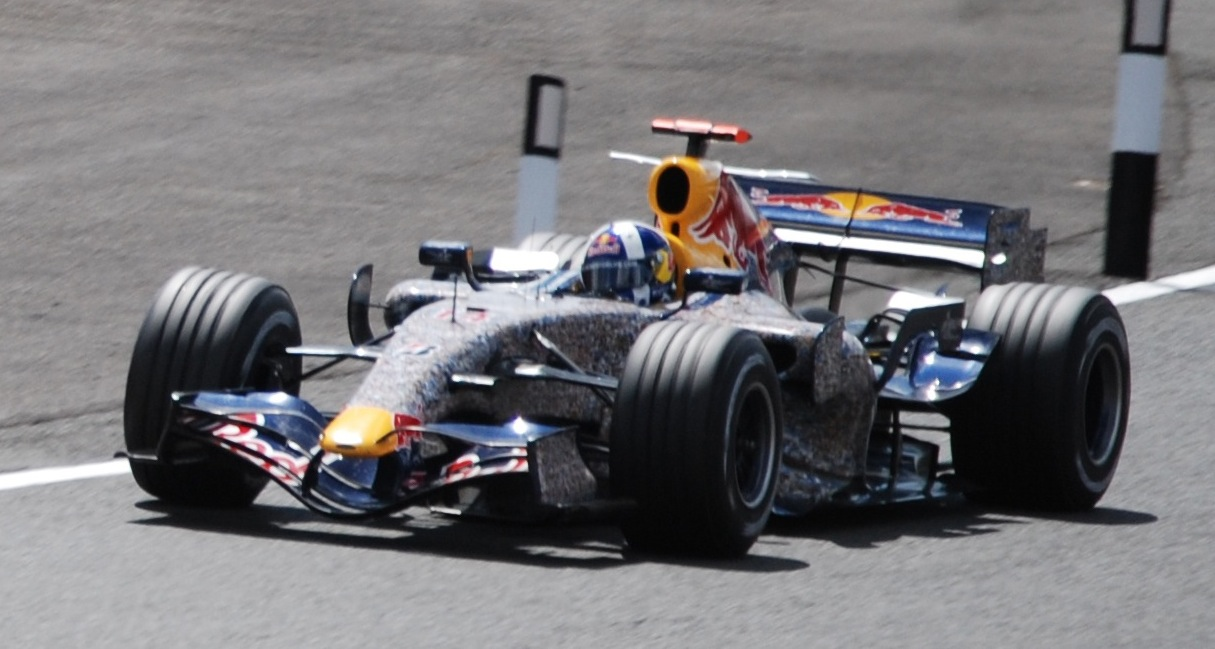
David Coulthard driving the RB3 at the 2007 British Grand Prix, with the one-off Wings for Life livery.

== Complete Formula One results ==
(key)

Year	Team	Engine	Tyres	Drivers	1	2	3	4	5	6	7	8	9	10	11	12	13	14	15	16	17	Points	WCC
2007	Red Bull Racing	Renault V8	B		AUS	MAL	BHR	ESP	MON	CAN	USA	FRA	GBR	EUR	HUN	TUR	ITA	BEL	JPN	CHN	BRA	24	5th
2007	Red Bull Racing	Renault V8	B	(United Kingdom) David Coulthard	Ret	Ret	Ret	5	14	Ret	Ret	13	11	5	11	10	Ret	Ret	4	8	9	24	5th
2007	Red Bull Racing	Renault V8	B	(Australia) Mark Webber	13	10	Ret	Ret	Ret	9	7	12	Ret	3	9	Ret	9	7	Ret	10	Ret	24	5th
