= Red Bull RB17 =

Hypercar manufactured by Red Bull

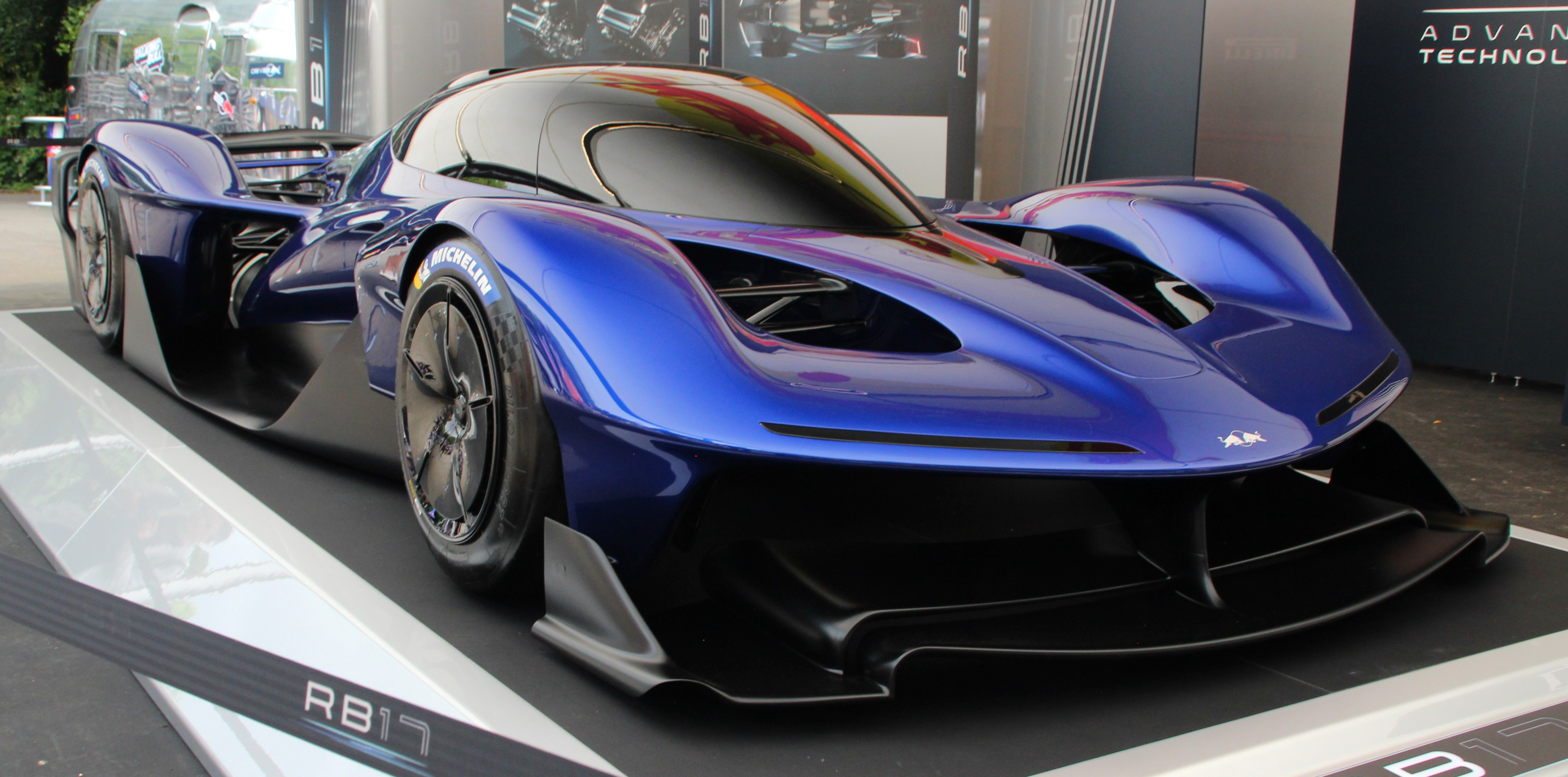

Overview
- Manufacturer: Red Bull Advanced Technologies
- Production: 2026 (expected)
- Assembly: Milton Keynes, Buckinghamshire, United Kingdom
- Designer: Adrian Newey (Chief Technical Officer); Rob Gray (Technical Director)

Body and chassis
- Class: Track-only car
- Body style: 2-door coupé
- Layout: Rear mid-engine, rear-wheel-drive
- Related: Aston Martin Valkyrie

Powertrain
- Engine: 4,500 cc (275 cu in) Cosworth naturally-aspirated V10
- Electric motor: 200 hp (149 kW; 203 PS); 400 N⋅m (295 lb⋅ft)
- Power output: 1,200 hp (895 kW; 1,217 PS) @ 15,000 rpm 1,100 N⋅m (811 lb⋅ft)
- Transmission: 6-speed sequential transmission
- Hybrid drivetrain: Full hybrid

Dimensions
- Kerb weight: 900 kg (1,984 lb)

The Red Bull RB17 is an upcoming limited production track-only hybrid sports car produced by Red Bull Advanced Technologies, the commercial technology and engineering arm of Formula One team Red Bull Racing. Primarily designed by Red Bull Racing's former Chief Technical Officer, designer, and aerodynamicist Adrian Newey, with additional assistance from team engineers, the RB17 is Red Bull's first production car.

The name RB17 is derived from Red Bull Racing's Formula One car naming scheme sequence, having been skipped in 2021 when the 2020 RB16 was reused as the RB16B and was followed in 2022 by the RB18. The car was unveiled to the public as a non-working full-scale version on 12 July 2024 at the Goodwood Festival of Speed. Production is scheduled to begin in 2026, and will be limited to 50 cars, costing £5 million each.

== Specifications ==
It is to be powered by a Cosworth-developed 4.5-litre V10 engine producing 1,000 hp (746 kW; 1,014 PS), and an electric motor producing 200 hp (149 kW; 203 PS). Producing a combined 1,200 hp (890 kW; 1,200 PS). Red Bull initially planned for the car to be powered by an F1-inspired twin-turbocharged V8 engine.

The transmission will be a six-speed sequential unit developed in-house, with the gears built by Xtrac. The weight of the RB17 will be 900 kg (2,000 lb), and it will be built entirely with carbon composite materials. It will use active suspension, which has not been permitted in F1 since the conclusion of the 1993 season.
