= Red Bull X2010 =

Fictional prototype vehicle

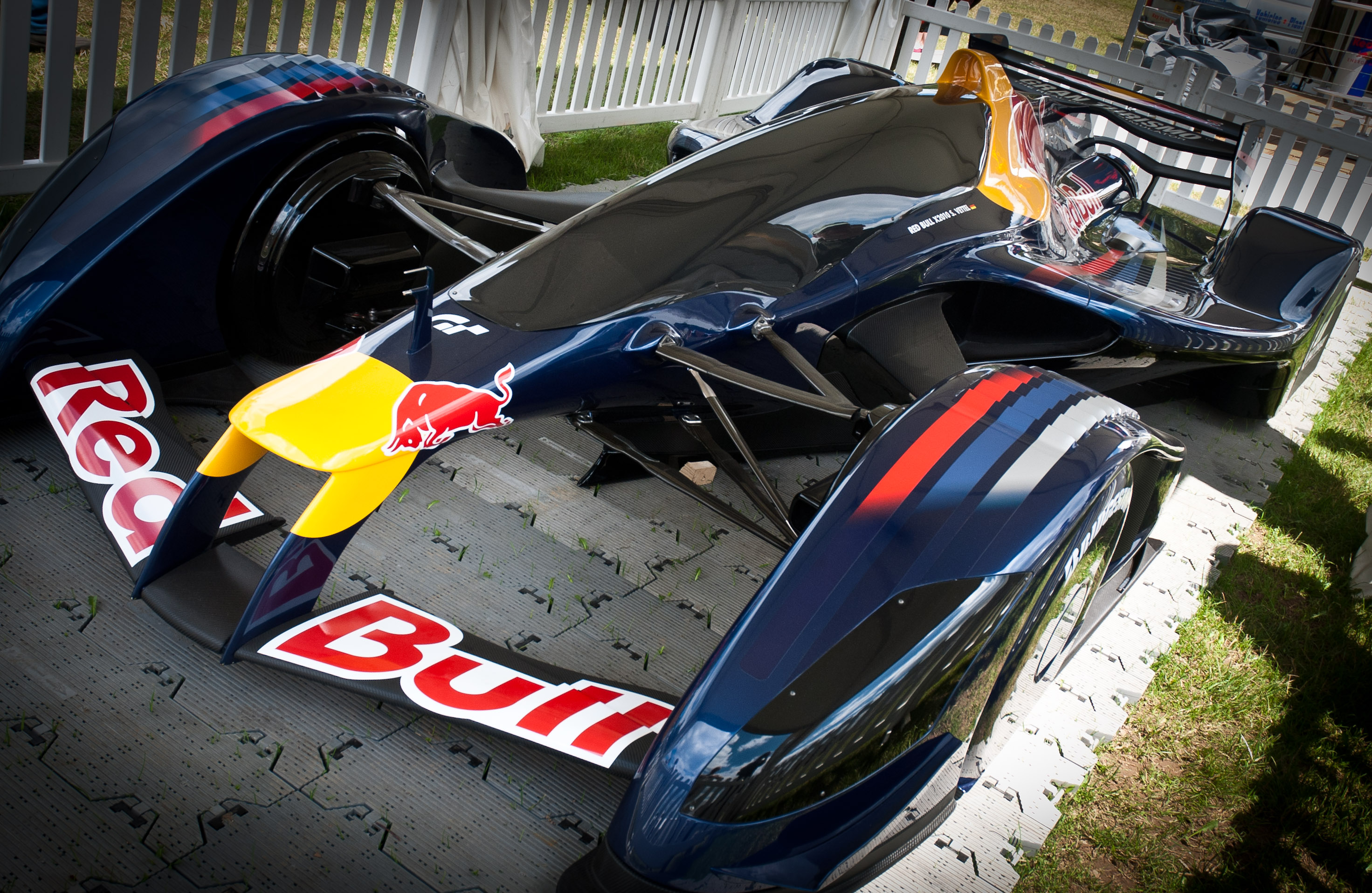
- A replica of the X2010
- Designers: Adrian Newey; Kazunori Yamauchi

Technical specifications
- Engine: 3.0L twin-turbocharged V6 in mid-mounted position
- Transmission: 7-speed semi-automatic transmission
- Power: 1,483 hp
- Weight: 545 kg (1,201.5 lb)

Competition history
- Debut: N/A

The Red Bull X2010, originally named Red Bull X1, is a fictional prototype vehicle featured in the PlayStation 3 video games Gran Turismo 5 and Gran Turismo 6. A full-size, non-functioning model appeared at the Goodwood Festival of Speed and in West Sussex, England. The digital creation was a response to Kazunori Yamauchi's question: "If you built the fastest racing car on land, one that throws aside all rules and regulations, what would that car look like, how would it perform, and how would it feel to drive?"

The prototype was designed by Red Bull Racing Chief Technical Officer Adrian Newey in conjunction with Yamauchi. It features enclosed wheels, and a fan element to increase low- and medium-speed downforce (much like in a Chaparral 2J or Brabham BT46B).

== Overview ==
The X2010 was theorised by Newey, former head engineer of Red Bull Racing, and Yamauchi, and features exclusively in later Gran Turismo video games. The hypothetical car, designed as an ultimate racing machine, was designed with pure speed in mind, rather than adherence to rules and regulations, making it theoretically superior to a Formula One car in terms of speed and handling.

Initially, the concept of the X2010 was based on a low air resistance, single-seat covered-wheel prototype: a car powered by a forced induction engine producing 1483 HP, aiming to achieve a top speed of over 470 km/h (292 mph) (max of 494 km/h whilst using slipstreams in the game) and a maximum lateral G-force of 6g. Upon seeing the machine's concept and design model, Newey proposed the addition of fan car technology, a long-time dream held as a racing designer.

The benefit of a so-called "fan car" is that air is continuously pulled from underneath the car, creating an area of comparatively lower pressure. This difference in pressure above and below the car presses it towards the ground, producing downforce. The fan principle allows the X2010 to maintain high cornering speeds in corners where traditional aerodynamic devices become insufficient at low speeds.

After the evaluation of the X2010's technology, the car was redesigned, incorporating refinement advice from Newey. With its low air resistance achieved through a smooth glass canopy and full cowling over the tyres, and the downforce gained from the fans (at lower speeds), the front and rear wings, and the rear diffuser (at higher speeds), the car ultimately achieved a theoretical maximum speed of 500 km/h, a weight of 545 kg, and a maximum lateral G force exceeding 8G.

The driver who performed the virtual shakedown test of the car was Red Bull Racing driver Sebastian Vettel. On his first run, he shortened the simulated course record held by Formula 1 cars on GT5's simulation of the Suzuka Circuit by over 20 seconds, drawing out the theoretical potential of the X2010 machine.

Due to its great speed and cornering, possession of the car makes simulator progress much easier, and because of this, it became a much sought-after model soon after Gran Turismo 5's release. In the United States, virtual copies of the car were on sale on the auction website eBay for as much as $250.

== Later versions ==
Version 2.0 of Gran Turismo 5 features an updated version of the car, the X2011, featuring a larger rear wing, a more powerful engine, and lower air resistance. A slightly detuned version of the X2010 with a larger wing and no fan, called the X2010 5G, was only offered in Japan as part of that country's Red Bull 5G competition series.

An updated version of the car, the X2014, appears in Gran Turismo 6 (with and without fan technology), Gran Turismo Sport (without fan technology), alongside an entry-level "Junior" variant, and Gran Turismo 7. A model was displayed at Autosport International 2014.

On Update 1.40 of Gran Turismo Sport, Red Bull Racing and Gran Turismo released the X2019 Competition, which was developed from the X2014 Standard. Unlike the previous models, the X2019 features a 3-liter naturally aspirated V12 engine rather than a turbocharged V6. The X2019 is designed to be a more realistic version of the car to be used in the FIA-Certified Gran Turismo Championships, as previous versions of the car were considered too fast to be used effectively by most drivers. The car was first introduced in the 2019 FIA Gran Turismo Championships, and will be painted in the colours of the finalists from their represented country in the Nations Cup Finals. The X2019 would appear again in Gran Turismo 7.

== Merchandise ==
In September 2012, it was announced that AUTOart would be producing a 1:18 scale version of the X2010. The model was released in a range of colours in 2013 and sold out. In 2016, the same company released a model of the X2014, available in three colours.
