= Adrian Newey =

British engineer, aerodynamicist and motorsport executive (born 1958)

Adrian Newey OBE
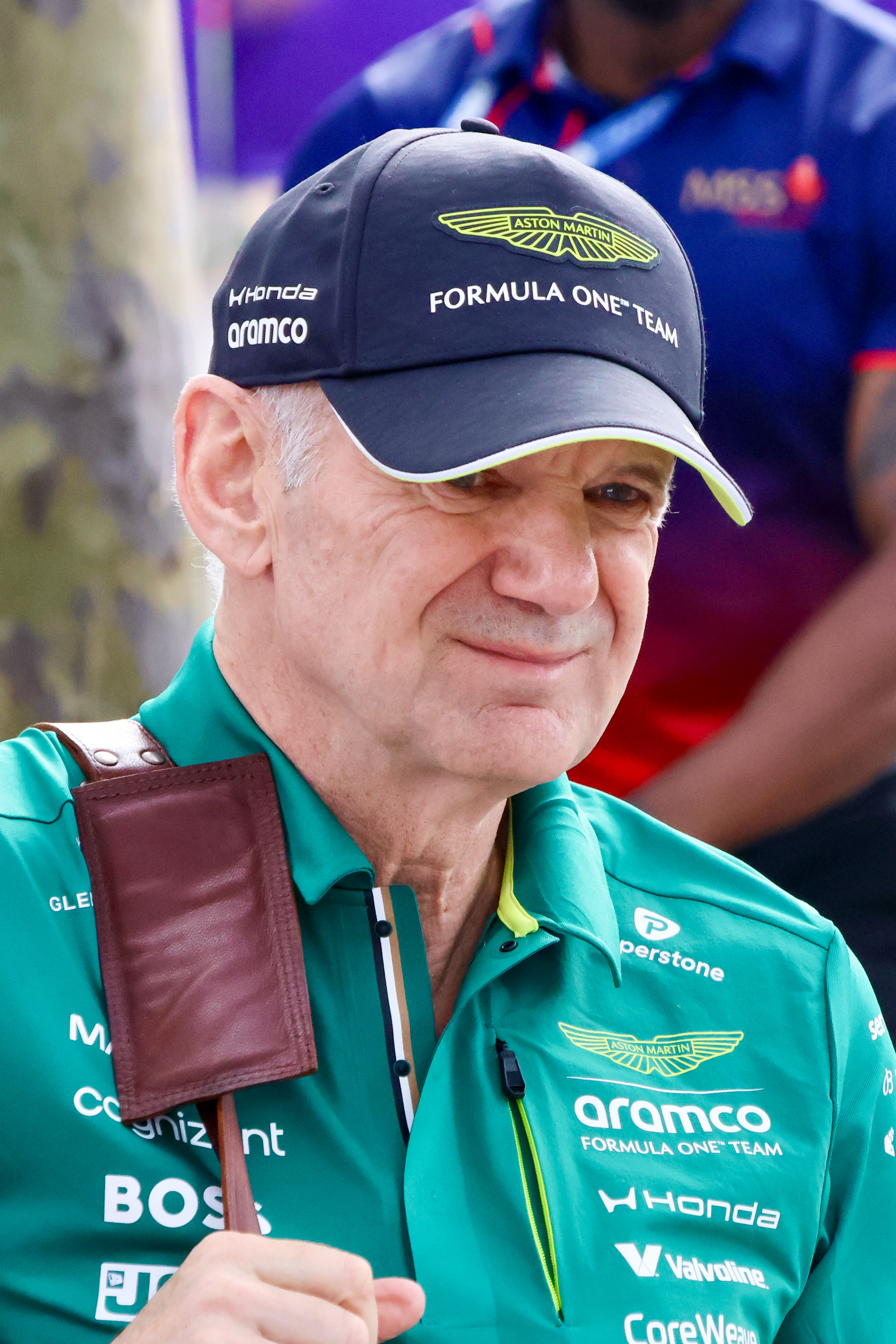
- Newey at the 2026 Australian Grand Prix
- Born: Adrian Martin Newey; 26 December 1958 (age 67); Colchester, Essex, England
- Education: University of Southampton (BSc)
- Occupations: Engineer; aerodynamicist; automotive designer; motorsport executive
- Employers: IMSA GT; March (1981–1983); CART IndyCar; March (1984–1986); Kraco (1986); Newman/Haas (1987); Formula One; Fittipaldi (1980); Haas Lola (1986); March (1988–1989); Leyton House (1990); Williams (1991–1996); McLaren (1997–2005); Red Bull (2006–2024); Aston Martin (2025–present)
- Title: Team Principal and Managing Technical Partner
- Spouses: Amanda (m. 1983; div. 1989) Marigold (m. 1992; div. 2010) Amanda Smerczak (m. 2017)
- Children: 4, including Harrison
- Relatives: Ron Smerczak (father-in-law)

24 Hours of Le Mans career
- Years: 2007
- Teams: AF Corse
- Best finish: 22nd (2007)
- Class wins: 0

Adrian Martin Newey (born 26 December 1958) is a British engineer, aerodynamicist, automotive designer, and motorsport executive. Since 2026, Newey has been team principal, technical director, and co-owner of Aston Martin in Formula One; he previously was technical director of Leyton House and McLaren, chief designer of March and Williams, and chief technical officer of Red Bull Racing. Widely regarded as the greatest engineer in Formula One history, Newey's designs have won 14 Drivers' and 12 Constructors' titles and 223 Grands Prix between 1991 and 2024.

After designing championship-winning Formula One cars for Williams and McLaren, Newey moved to Red Bull in 2006, his cars winning the Formula One Drivers' and Constructors' titles consecutively from 2010 to 2013, the Drivers' Championship in 2021, and both titles in 2022 and 2023. The Newey-designed RB19 is the most successful Formula One car in history, winning 21 out of the 22 races (95.45%) in which it competed. Newey's designs also won the 1985 and 1986 CART titles. On 1 May 2024, Red Bull Racing announced that Newey would leave his day-to-day Formula One design duties immediately and shift his focus to the RB17 hypercar. Newey departed the company in the first quarter of 2025 and commenced work at Aston Martin, though he is still involved in the RB17 hypercar project, including its updated final design.

== Early life and career ==
Adrian Martin Newey was born in Colchester, Essex, England, on 26 December 1958, the son of Richard and Edwina Newey. His father was a veterinarian and his mother was an ambulance driver during World War II. He attended Repton public school alongside motoring journalist and writer Jeremy Clarkson. Repton expelled Newey at age 16 after at a Greenslade concert at Repton's 19th-century Pears School Building organised by the school's sixth formers, Newey pushed up the sound levels on the band's mixer, which cracked the building's stained glass windows.

Newey gained a first class honours degree in Aeronautical Engineering from the University of Southampton in 1980. Immediately after graduation, Newey began working in motorsport for the Fittipaldi Formula One team under Harvey Postlethwaite. In 1981, he joined the March team. After a period as a race engineer for Johnny Cecotto in European Formula 2, Newey began designing racing cars. His first projects were the March 82G and 83G sports cars to compete in the IMSA GT Championship. The latter was highly successful and won the IMSA's title in 1983 and 1984.

== CART career ==
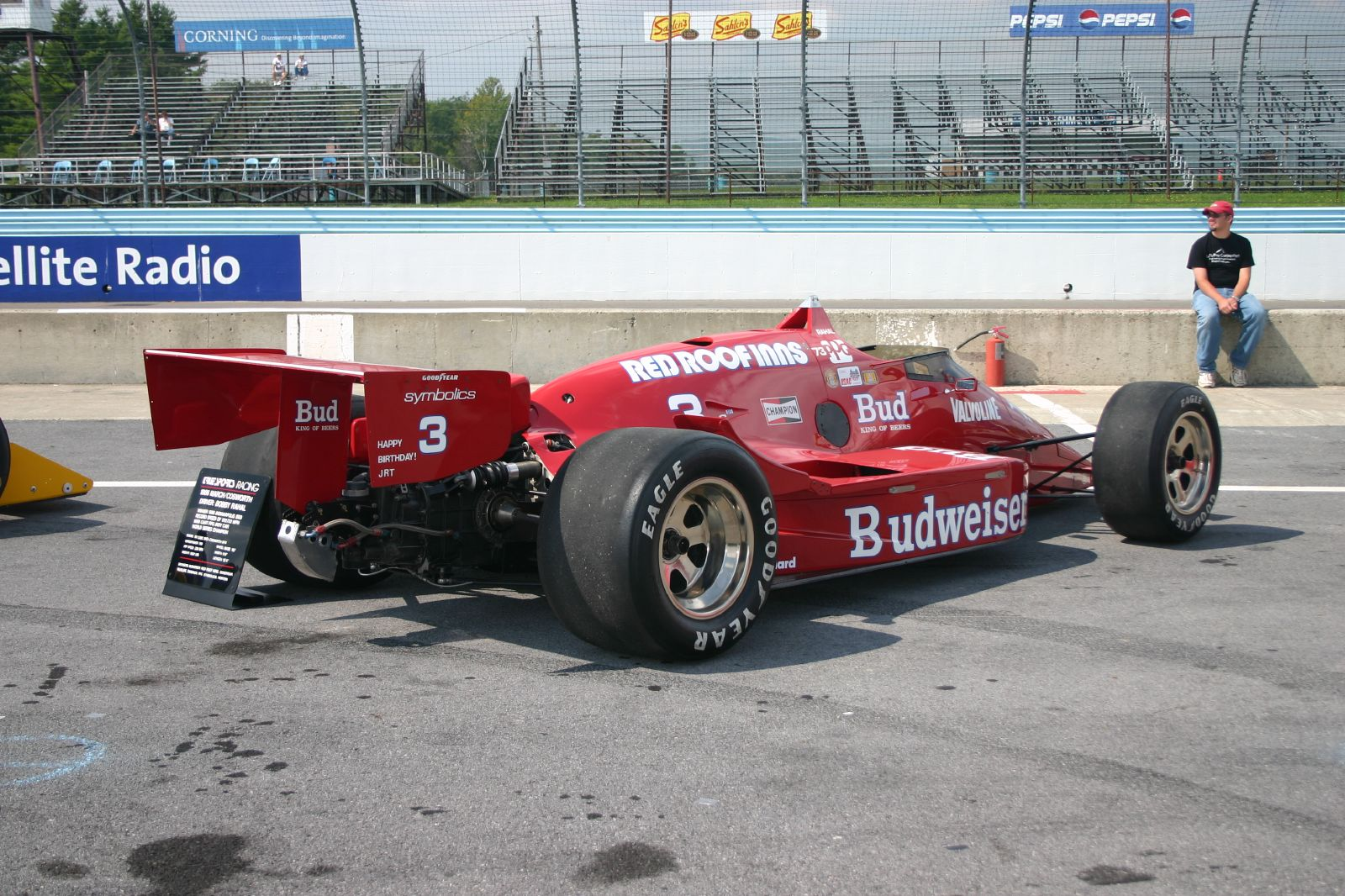
The March 86C chassis driven by Bobby Rahal won the 1986 Indianapolis 500 and the CART title.

In 1984, Newey moved to the March Indy car project, working as designer and race engineer for Bobby Rahal at Truesports. Newey formed a close friendship with Rahal, which would impact their careers some fifteen years later. Newey's March 85C design won the 1985 CART championship in the hands of Al Unser, and the 1985 Indianapolis 500 with Danny Sullivan. In 1986, Newey moved to Kraco to engineer Michael Andretti's car, while his March 86C design won the 1986 CART championship and 1986 Indianapolis 500 with Bobby Rahal. At the end of 1986, Newey joined the Haas Lola Formula One team in an effort to improve its fortunes, but the team withdrew at the conclusion of the 1986 season. After a spell at Newman-Haas in 1987 working as Mario Andretti's race engineer, Newey was re-hired by March, this time to work in Formula One as chief designer.

== Formula One career ==
=== March/Leyton House (1988–1990) ===
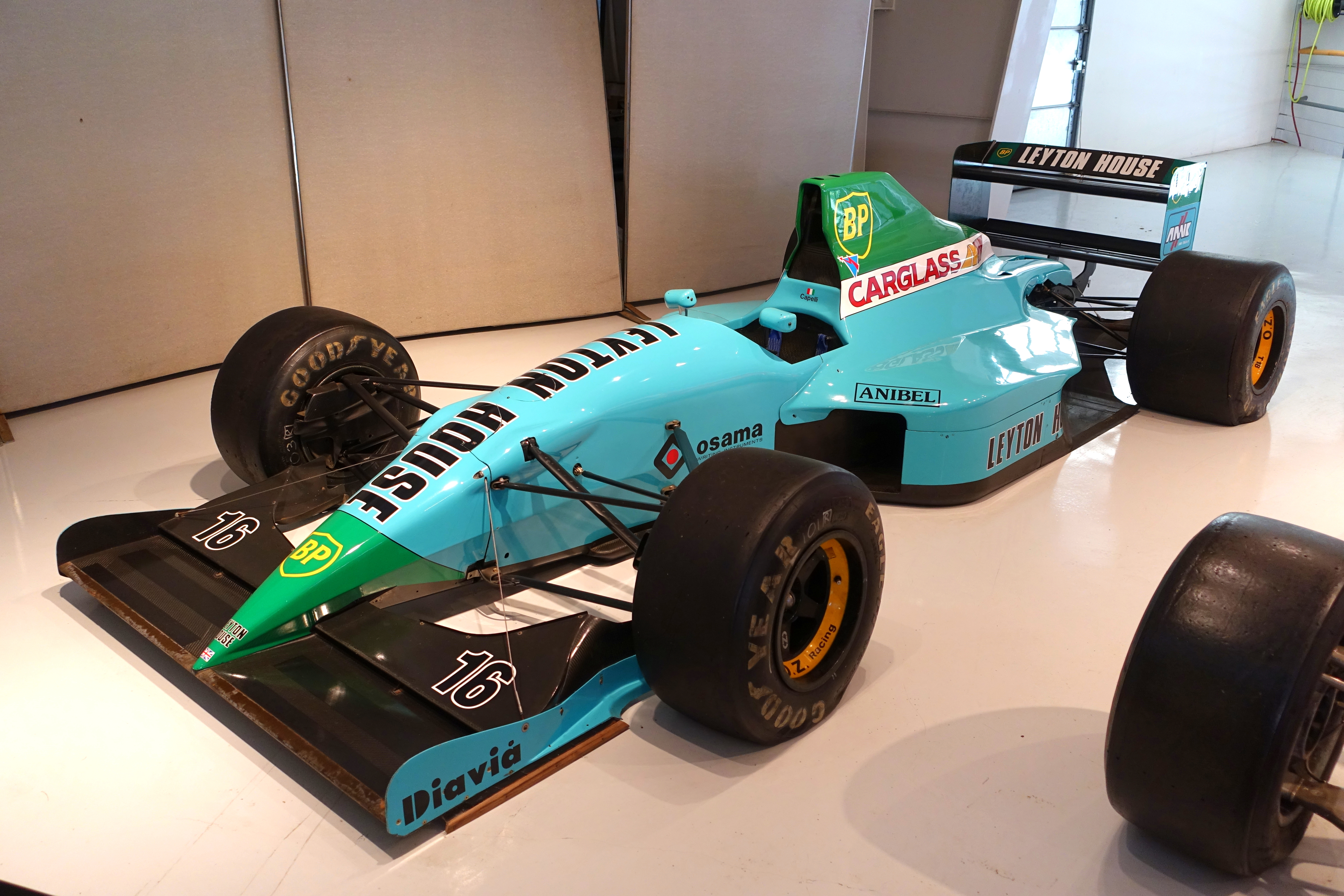
At the 1990 French Grand Prix, Ivan Capelli led and finished second at the wheel of the Leyton House CG901.

Newey's first Formula One design, the 1988 March 881, was far more competitive than many expected, with Ivan Capelli finishing second in Portugal, and even passing Alain Prost's McLaren-Honda turbo for the lead of the 1988 Japanese Grand Prix briefly on lap 16. As March became Leyton House Racing in 1990, Newey gained promotion to the role of technical director. At the 1990 French Grand Prix, Capelli led the most part of the race and finished second after a late pass by Prost's Ferrari, but that proved to be the year's bright spot, with the team's results declining. In the summer of 1990, Newey was fired, although he soon found another role. Newey later said: "I was fired but I'd already made up my mind I was going – because once a team gets run by an accountant, it's time to move. Your self-confidence does suffer but Williams had approached me."

=== Williams (1991–1996) ===
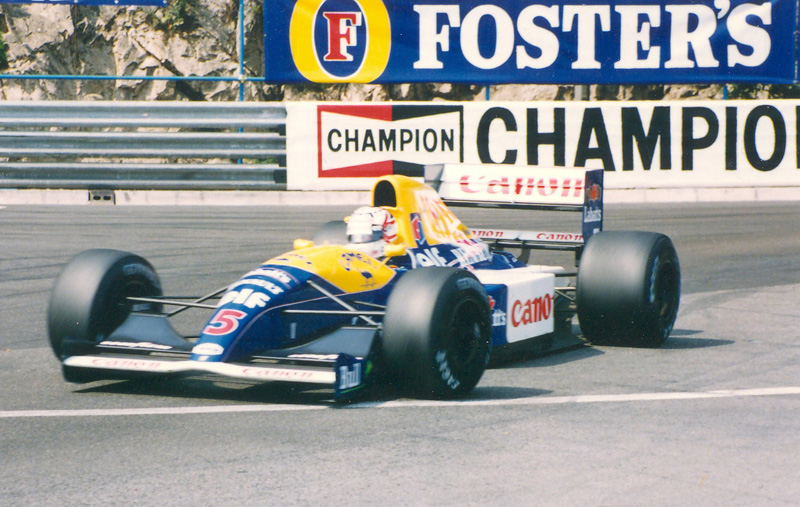
The Williams FW14 won 17 Grands Prix, 21 pole positions, and 289 points, earning Nigel Mansell the 1992 title.

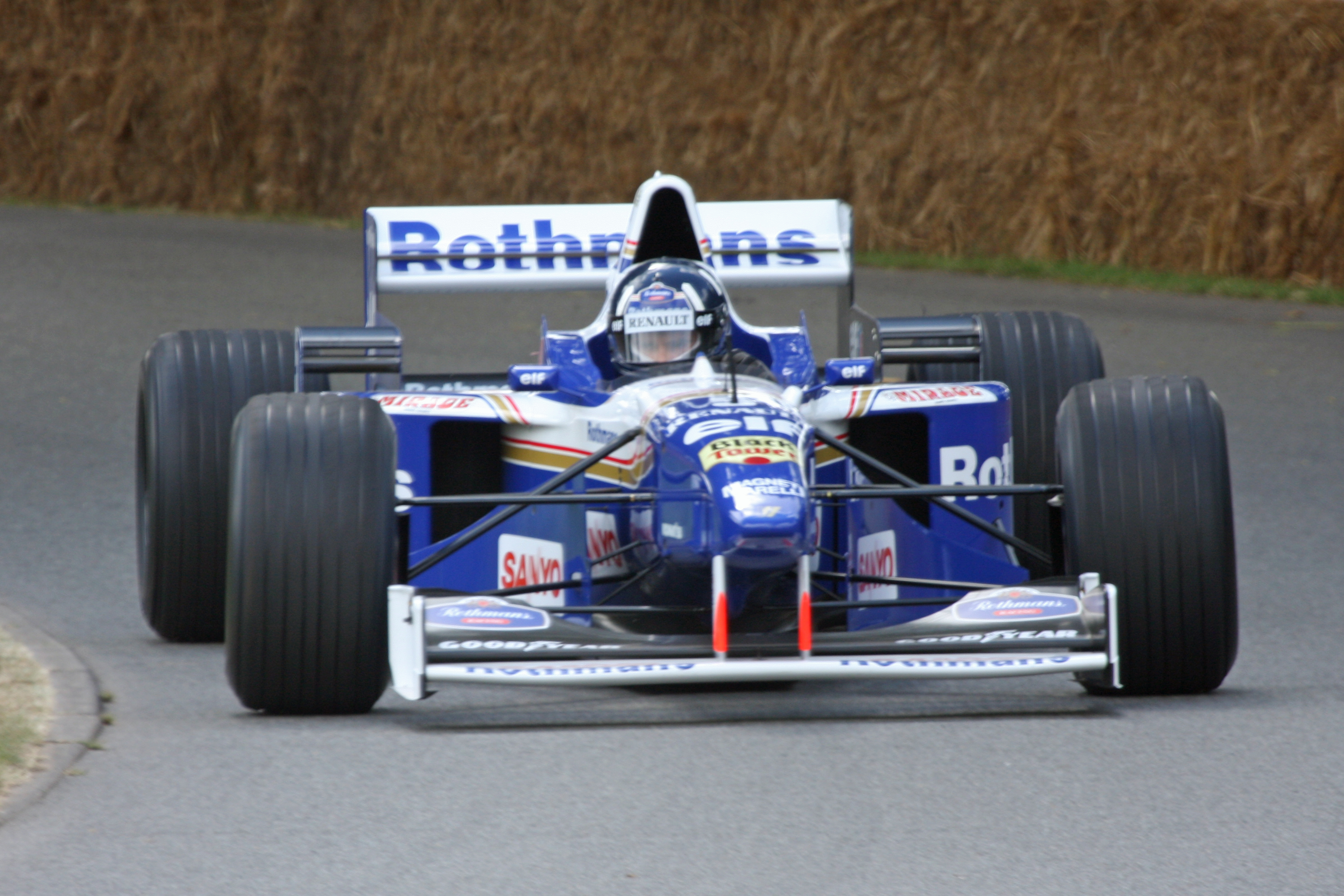
Williams Renault FW18 driven by 1996 World Champion Damon Hill

Through the 1980s and into the 1990s, Williams was a top running team, and technical director Patrick Head wasted no time in getting a contract signed. With a vastly superior budget, drivers, and resources at his disposal, Newey and Head rapidly became the dominant design partnership of the early 1990s. By mid-season 1991, Newey's FW14 chassis was every bit a match for the previously dominant McLaren, but early season reliability issues and the efforts of Ayrton Senna prevented Williams team leader Nigel Mansell from taking the title. In 1992, there would be no problems, and with dominance of the sport not repeated until the 2000s Ferrari years of Michael Schumacher, Mansell took the Drivers' title and Newey secured his first Constructors' title. 1993 delivered a second, this time with Alain Prost at the wheel of the FW15C.

1994 saw a rare dip in performance for Newey-designed cars and the team and drivers struggled to match Schumacher and the Rory Byrne-designed Benetton B194 for pace and reliability. Disaster struck at the 1994 San Marino Grand Prix with the death of Senna who had joined Williams that year. A late-season charge, helped by a two-race ban for Schumacher, enabled Williams to claim their third straight Constructors' title; however, Williams were unable to take a third consecutive Drivers' title, and with possible manslaughter charges for Senna's accident in prospect, cracks began to show in Newey's relationship with Williams team management.

By 1995, it was clear that Newey was once more ready to become technical director of a team. With Head a share-holding founder of Williams, he found his way blocked. Loss of both Drivers' and Constructors' titles to Benetton in 1995 saw further distance put between Newey and Williams, and by the time Damon Hill and Jacques Villeneuve secured both titles in 1996, Newey had been placed on gardening leave prior to joining McLaren. His career at Williams ended with his cars winning 59 race victories, 78 pole positions, and 60 fastest laps all from 114 races from 1991 until 1997. These seven years saw four drivers clinch World Championship titles.

=== McLaren (1997–2005) ===
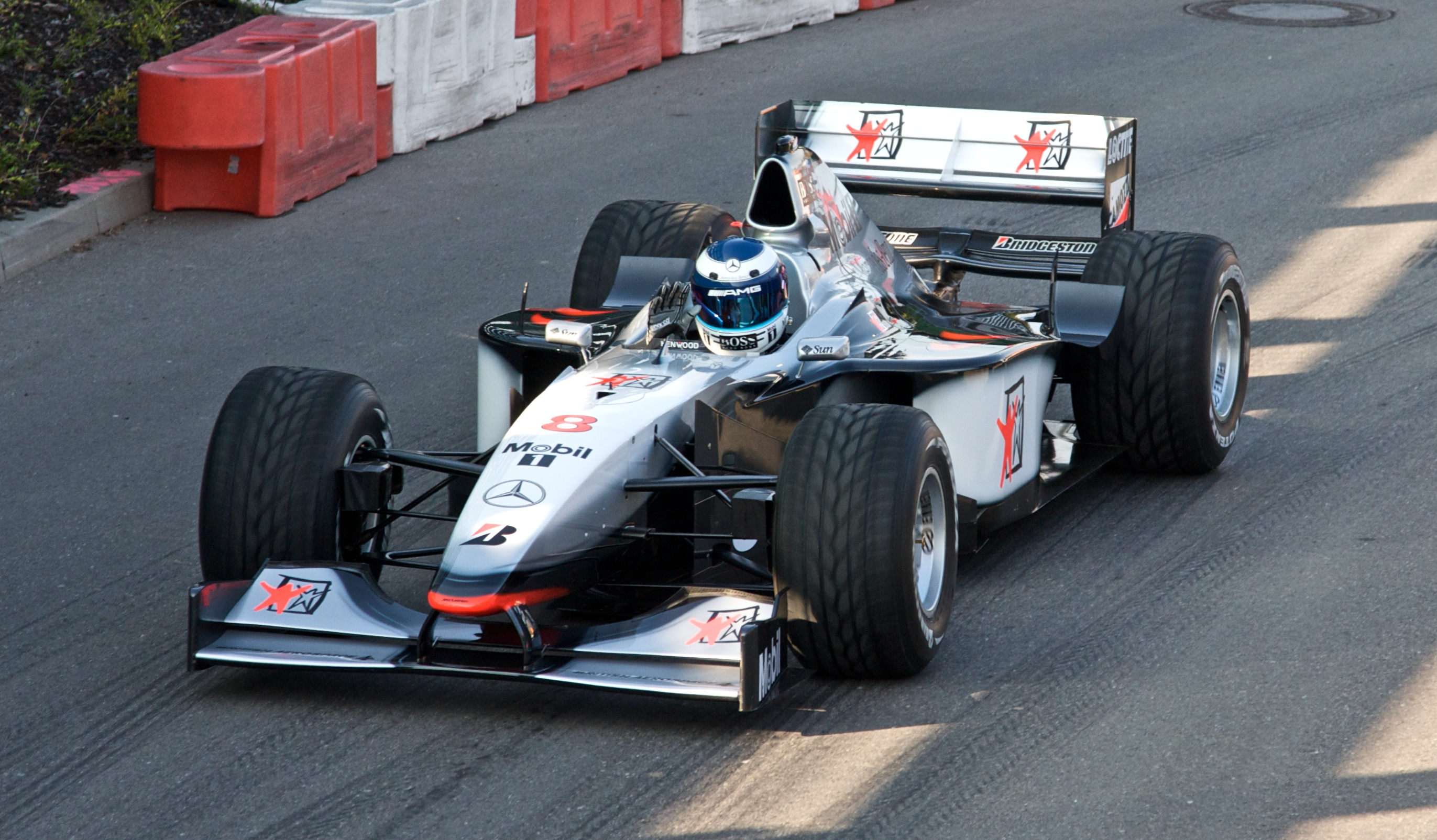
Mika Häkkinen in a McLaren MP4-13

Unable to influence the design of the 1997 McLaren (the MP4/12), Newey was forced to attempt to improve on the Neil Oatley design while concentrating his efforts on the 1998 car. A win at the 1997 European Grand Prix saw McLaren enter the off-season on a high, and when the racing resumed four months later the McLaren MP4/13 was the car to beat. Titles followed in 1998 and 1999 (with the McLaren MP4/14), and Mika Häkkinen narrowly missed out on a third Drivers' title in 2000.

In the spring of 2001, Newey signed a contract with the Jaguar F1 team managed by Newey's friend and former CART colleague Bobby Rahal. Despite having a signed contract, Rahal was unable to complete the deal when McLaren boss Ron Dennis persuaded Newey to stay. Newey and Rahal later stated that the deal failed due to Rahal's position within Jaguar being undermined by Niki Lauda and internal politics at Ford. Rahal was fired from the team several months later.

Despite remaining with McLaren, rumours persisted that Newey wanted to leave the team. By late 2004, his future began to look uncertain when speculation began that Newey could return to Williams or even leave the sport completely. Despite strenuous denials from Dennis, stories continued to circulate during the 2004–2005 off-season that Newey's departure was imminent. In April 2005, it was confirmed that his contract with the team had been extended by six months to the end of the year at which point he was expected to take a sabbatical or retire from Formula One design completely. On 19 July, he stated that "this step can wait" and he would remain with McLaren for the year 2006.

=== Red Bull (2006–2024) ===
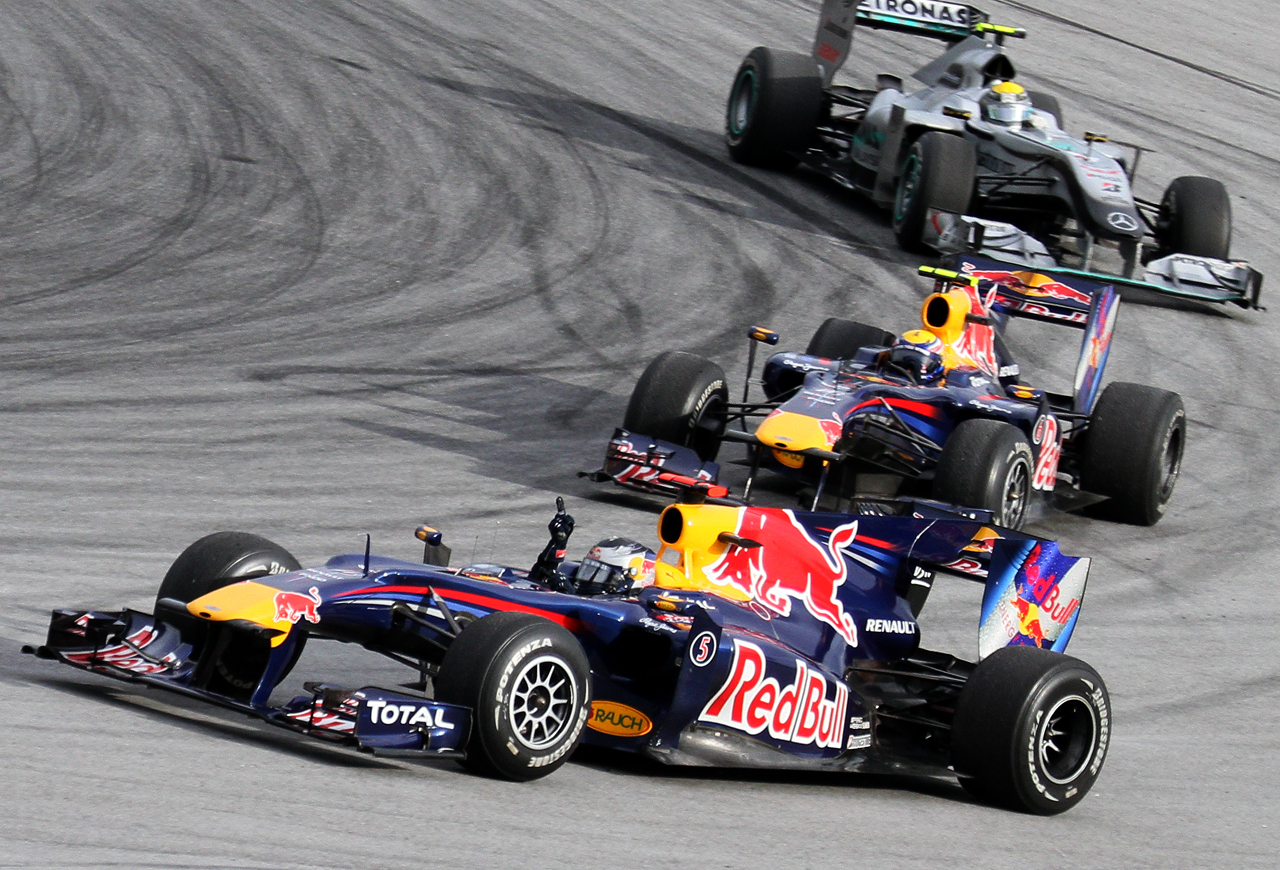
Sebastian Vettel and Mark Webber at the 2010 Malaysian Grand Prix in the Red Bull RB6. Vettel won his and Red Bull's maiden title that year.

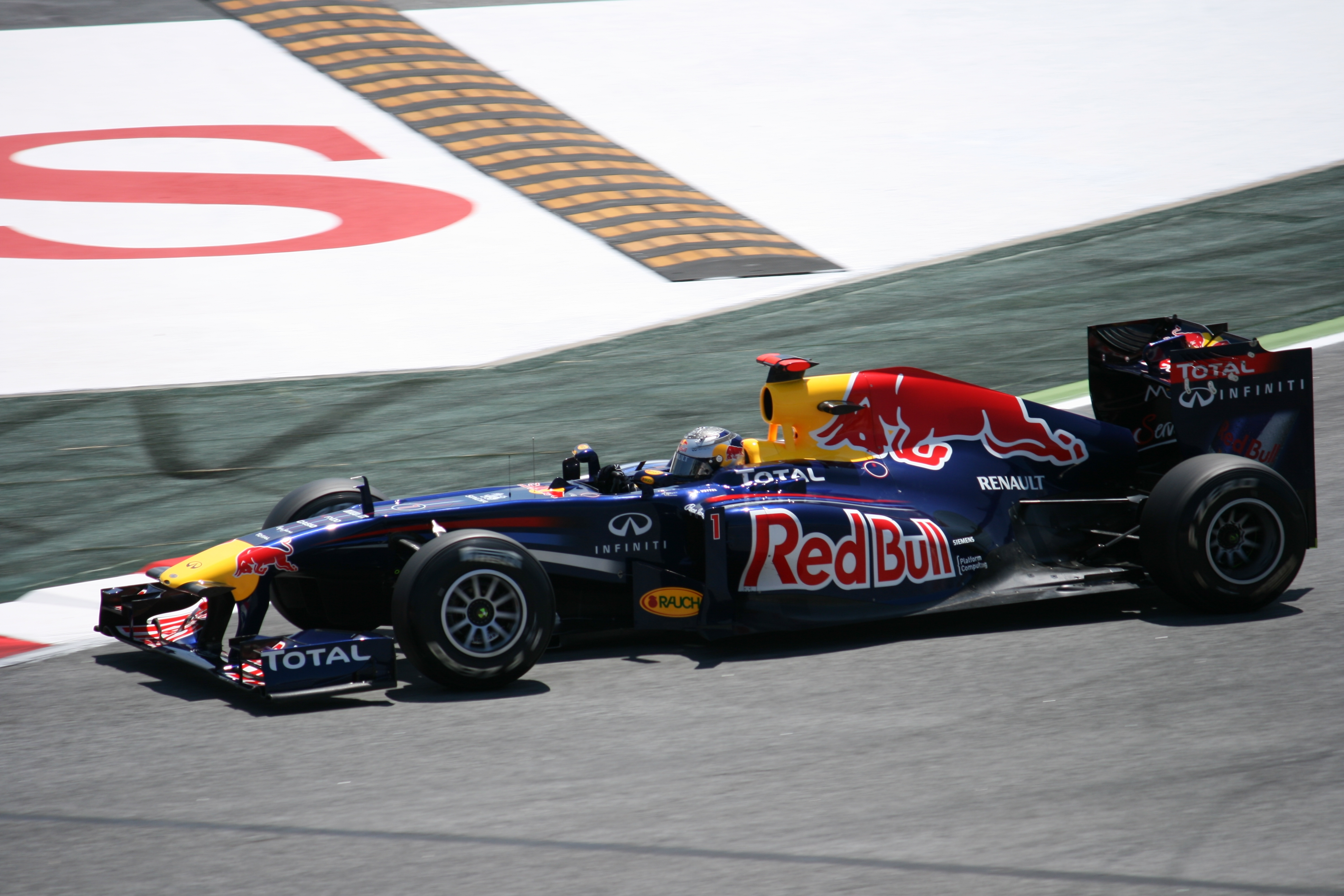
Sebastian Vettel took his second title in 2011 driving the Red Bull RB7.

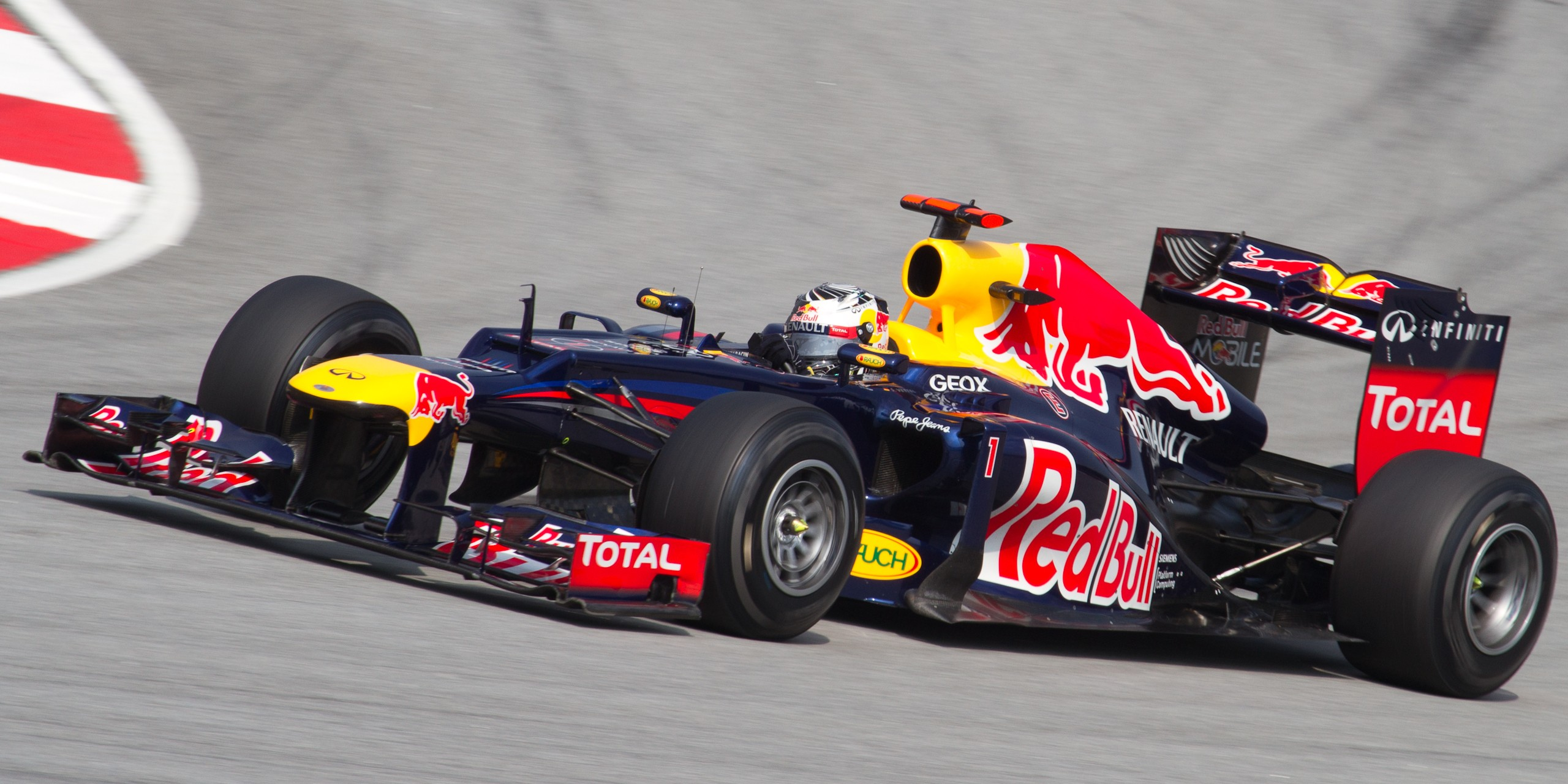
Sebastian Vettel took his third consecutive title in 2012 in a Red Bull RB8.

Despite those assurances, Red Bull Racing announced on 8 November 2005 that Newey would join the team from February 2006. He was reported to getting around $10 million a year at Red Bull after McLaren baulked at increasing his salary in contract renewal negotiations. Newey could hardly influence the design of the 2006 car (the RB2) and Red Bull's season started with poor results, having scored only two points from six races; however, the team's lead driver, David Coulthard, who had driven Newey-designed cars for years for both Williams and McLaren, managed to secure third place and six points in the Monaco Grand Prix. Although assisted by retirements of other competitors, indications were that the team was eventually beginning to pick up where it left off in 2005 when they finished a close seventh overall.

The 2007 Red Bull of his design (the RB3) was powered by the Renault RS26 engine as the Ferrari 056 contract was transferred to Toro Rosso, Red Bull Racing's sister team. The car was reasonably fast but rather unreliable, with each driver retiring seven times in a season of 17 races. Nevertheless, with the disqualification of McLaren-Mercedes, Red Bull achieved fifth place in the 2007 Constructors' Championship as targeted. Newey and his fellow technical director Geoff Willis noted that the 2008 chassis (the RB4) was the most intricate design to have rolled out of their factory. The season started well for the team, with Mark Webber scoring five consecutive points finishes and Coulthard claiming a podium at Montreal. At the half-way mark, Red Bull was in a fierce battle for fourth place in the Constructors Championship, along with Renault and Toyota; however, Red Bull scored just five points in the second half of the season (compared to 24 in the first half) as the team slipped down the grid. Even Toro Rosso managed to outscore them by the end of the season.

The RB5, the car Newey designed for 2009, represented a large step up in performance for the team, with one–two finishes at Shanghai, in a rain affected race, and at the British Grand Prix, both won by Sebastian Vettel. Webber went on to win in Germany before a hat-trick of wins for the team at the end of the season, including another one–two in Abu Dhabi. Red Bull finished the season a comfortable second in the Constructors' Championship. The 2010 Red Bull car (the RB6) started the season well and proved to be the class of the field, winning on circuits requiring strengths in widely differing areas and winning the Constructors' Championship. It took 15 out of a possible 19 pole positions. At the 2010 Brazilian Grand Prix, Red Bull won the 2010 Constructors' Championship. On 14 November 2010, when Red Bull won the World Drivers' Championship with Vettel, Newey became the only Formula One designer to have won Constructors' Championships with three different teams.

The 2011 RB7 built on the RB6's speed and also proved to be reliable, making it the clearly dominant car in the pack. The car took 18 of the 19 pole positions and won 12 races. On 9 October, Red Bull won the 2011 World Drivers' Championship, making Vettel the youngest double champion in the history of Formula One. Red Bull followed up this title with securing the Constructors' Championship on 16 October at the 2011 Korean Grand Prix. In 2012, despite initial concerns as to the RB8's superiority compared to the McLaren MP4-27 and a stern challenge from Ferrari's Fernando Alonso in the inferior F2012, Red Bull and Vettel once again claimed the championship at a dramatic 2012 Brazilian Grand Prix. In 2013, the RB9 and Vettel dominated the field after the summer break to defend both the World Drivers' and World Constructors' Championship in style at the 2013 Indian Grand Prix with Vettel scoring a record-breaking 9 consecutive wins from the 2013 Belgian Grand Prix until the season-ending 2013 Brazilian Grand Prix. On 8 June 2014, Red Bull Racing announced that Newey had extended his contract for the next few seasons, giving Newey a wider responsibility including "new Red Bull Technology projects". Allegedly, Red Bull fought off a £20 million contract offer by Ferrari.

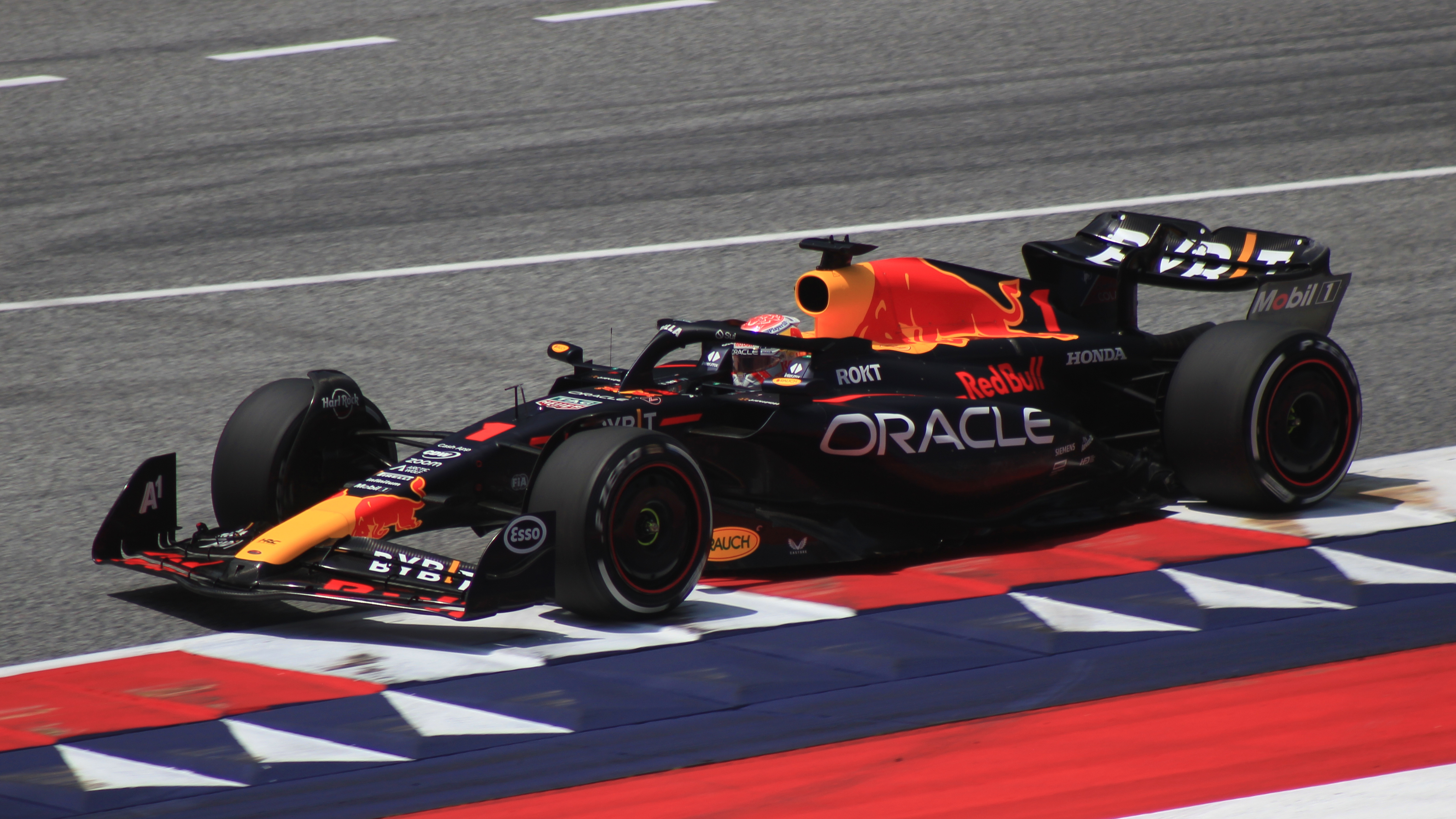
The RB19, the car Newey designed for Red Bull for the 2023 season, driven by Max Verstappen.

After the sport introduced V6 turbo-hybrid power units in 2014, Newey's cars were held back by the performance of the Renault power units, but a switch to Honda power in 2019 eventually gave the team a power unit capable of winning a title. Between 2014 and 2020, all of his cars except the RB11 driven by Daniel Ricciardo and Daniil Kvyat in 2015 won at least two Grands Prix, with the RB10, RB12, and RB16 taking second place in the 2014, 2016, and 2020 Constructors' Championships. The 2021 season saw the team return to title contention, with the RB16B design winning the Drivers' Championship with Max Verstappen. In 2022, the RB18 proved to be a strong contender and gave Verstappen his second Drivers' Championship at the 2022 Japanese Grand Prix, as well as delivering Red Bull their first Constructors' Championship since 2013. It was followed in 2023 by the RB19, which would end up being one of the most dominant Formula One cars in history, with a win rate of 95.45% beating the previous record of 93.8% set by the McLaren MP4/4 from 1988.

At the 2023 Canadian Grand Prix, Verstappen took Red Bull's 100th win, which also marked Newey's 200th win in Formula One. Later that year, Red Bull broke McLaren's legendary record of 11 consecutives victories by winning in Hungary. At Monza, Verstappen broke Vettel's historic 9 consecutive wins. This win was also the 15th in a row for Red Bull, setting two new records. On 25 April 2024, motorsport media outlets began reporting Newey having interest in leaving Red Bull. Red Bull Racing responded to the reports via a spokesman to PlanetF1.com stating that "Adrian is contracted until at least the end of 2025 ... We are unaware of him joining any other team." Five days later, it was reported that Newey's departure was complete and an official announcement would be issued prior to the 2024 Miami Grand Prix. In 2024, the RB20 went on to win the Drivers' Championship with Verstappen but Red Bull finished only third in the Constructors' Championship. Newey left Red Bull Racing during the first quarter of 2025 and stepped away from his Formula One duties while still working on their first hypercar on the trackside, the RB17.

=== Aston Martin (2025–present) ===
Newey signed a contract with Aston Martin, as a shareholder and Managing Technical Partner for the team. His move was announced in September 2024 with him officially starting work on 1 March 2025, in time for the 2026 regulations. In November 2025, it was announced that Newey will take over the role of Team Principal at Aston Martin in 2026, replacing incumbent Andy Cowell who will move to the role of Chief Strategy Officer.

== Death of Ayrton Senna ==
Following the death of Ayrton Senna at the 1994 San Marino Grand Prix in a car that Newey helped to design, Newey was among several members of the Williams team to be charged with manslaughter. In an initial ruling in December 1997, Newey was acquitted. The acquittal was upheld on appeal in November 1999. In January 2003, Italy's Supreme Court of Cassation re-opened the case, citing "material errors"; the court gave Newey a full acquittal in May 2005.

== Other ventures ==
Newey is an avid sports car collector and driver, having participated in the Le Mans Legend races for a few years. He destroyed a Ford GT40 while competing in 2006, but escaped with only a cut finger. He later wrecked a Jaguar E-Type at the Goodwood Revival Meeting. In 2007, he made the move to modern racing, becoming part of the driver line-up in the AF Corse Ferrari F430 for the 24 Hours of Le Mans. Newey and co-drivers Ben Aucott and Joe Macari managed to finish 22nd outright, and fourth in class.

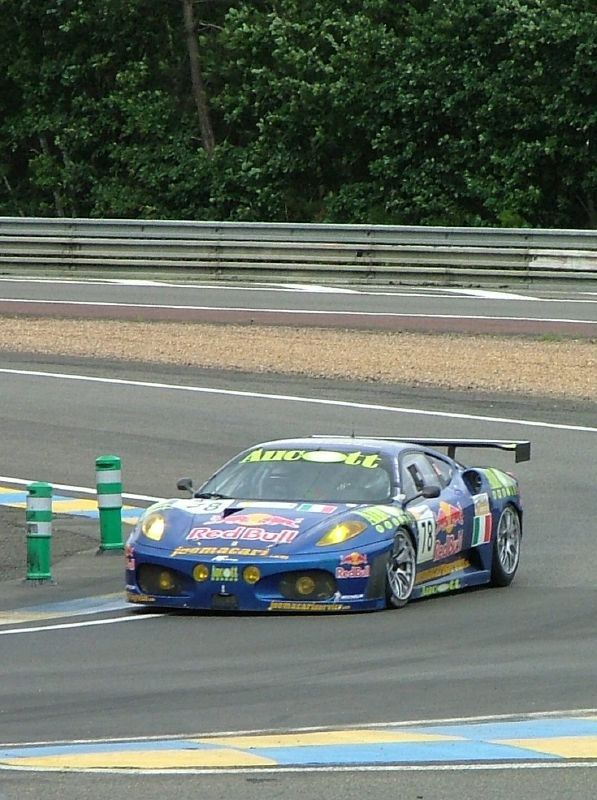
The No. 78 Ferrari F430 that Newey drove at the 2007 24 Hours of Le Mans.

On 15 June 2010, during the Sony E3 Electronic Entertainment Expo press conference, it was revealed that Newey collaborated as the chief technical officer for the video game Gran Turismo 5 for the PlayStation 3. A game trailer showed Newey along with race car driver Sebastian Vettel at the Red Bull Technology building in Great Britain in discussion with Kazunori Yamauchi, a Japanese game designer who is the CEO of Polyphony Digital and creator and producer of the Gran Turismo series. The three's collaboration would later lead to the completion of concept cars Red Bull X2010 and Red Bull X2011, which appeared in that game.

On 2 July 2010, Newey was rewarded with his own Red Bull RB5, out of regard for his achievements with Red Bull Racing since he joined the team in 2007. Newey first drove the car up the hill at the 2010 Goodwood Festival of Speed. On 8 August 2010, Newey was involved in an accident whilst taking part in the Ginetta G50 Cup at the Snetterton circuit as a guest driver. He was spun into the path of Tony Hughes, and his car sustained a heavy side-on impact. He was taken to hospital for precautionary checks, but sustained no serious injuries. On 10 October 2018, Newey was announced as an advisory board member of the forthcoming W Series, a racing championship for women based on Formula 3-homologated Tatuus T-318 chassis.

Apart from the RB17 hypercar that Newey is involved in, he had also been involved in the design of the Aston Martin Valkyrie hybrid sports car back during his time in Red Bull Racing as Chief Technical Officer, working in collaboration with Aston Martin and also Red Bull Advanced Technologies. Besides cars, Newey has also been involved in the design of a submarine for Red Bull's late co-founder Dietrich Mateschitz which was a personal wish and one which Dietrich had intended to use in his private island, Laucala Island. In addition to the submarine, Newey was also involved in the design of a custom Oyster 885 Yacht Series II, by Oyster Yachts to "build his ‘dream bluewater sailing boat’, with the ambition to one day to sail around the world."

== Personal life ==
Newey's first wife was Amanda, a nurse, and they had two daughters. They married in 1983 and separated in 1989. He married his second wife Marigold in 1992 and they separated in 2010. They had a daughter, and son Harrison, who became a racing driver, winning both the 2016–17 MRF Challenge Formula 2000 Championship and the 2017–18 Asian Le Mans Series. Newey has been married to Amanda "Mandy" Smerczak since August 2017. She is the daughter of South African actor Ron Smerczak.

== Awards and honours ==
=== Formula One World Championships ===
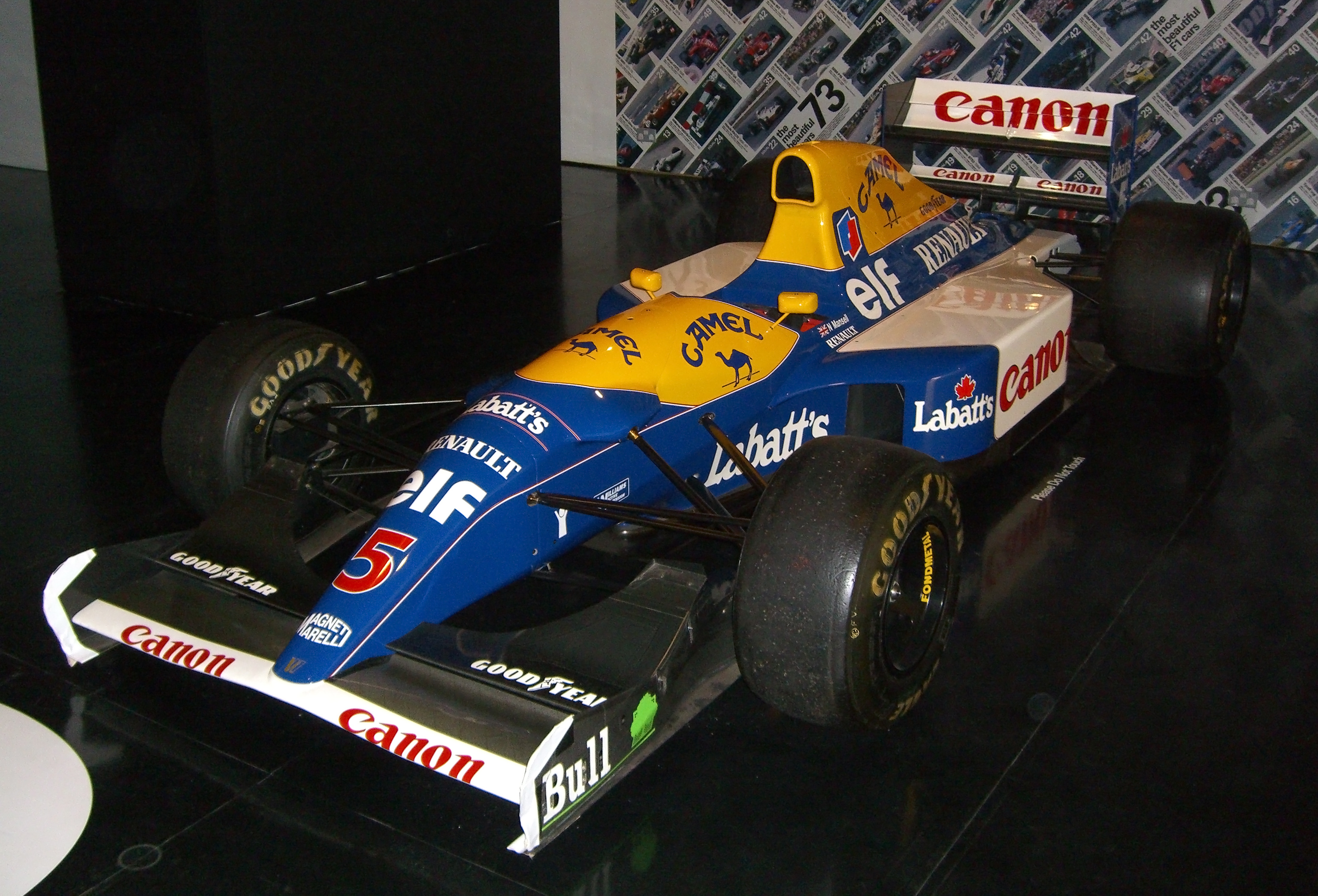
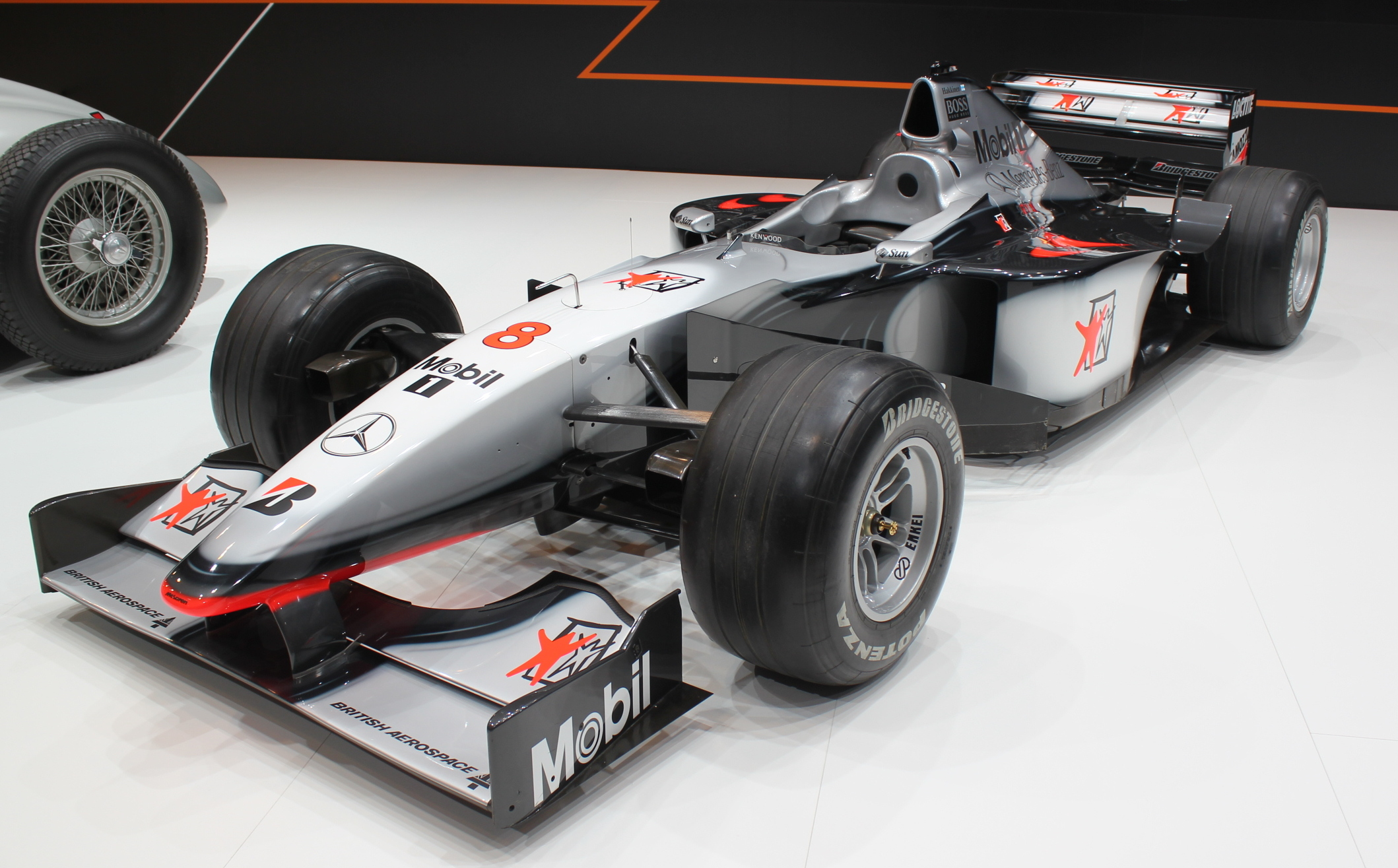
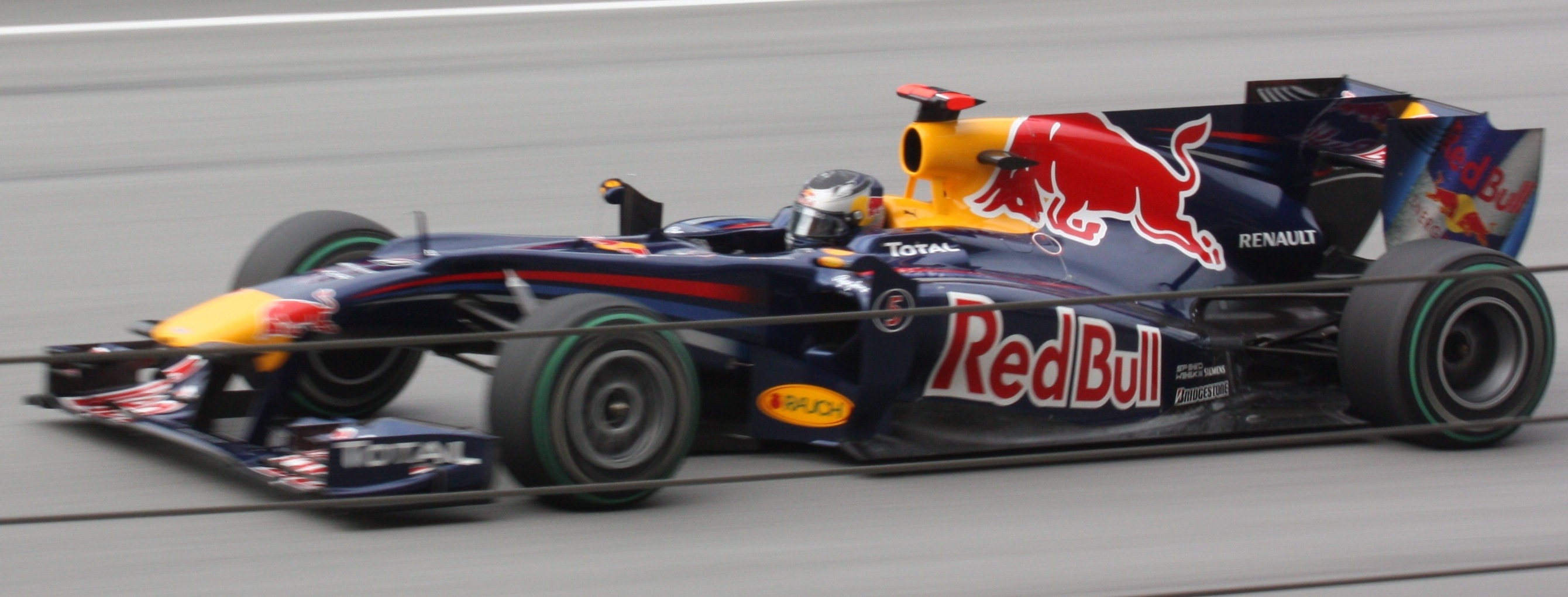
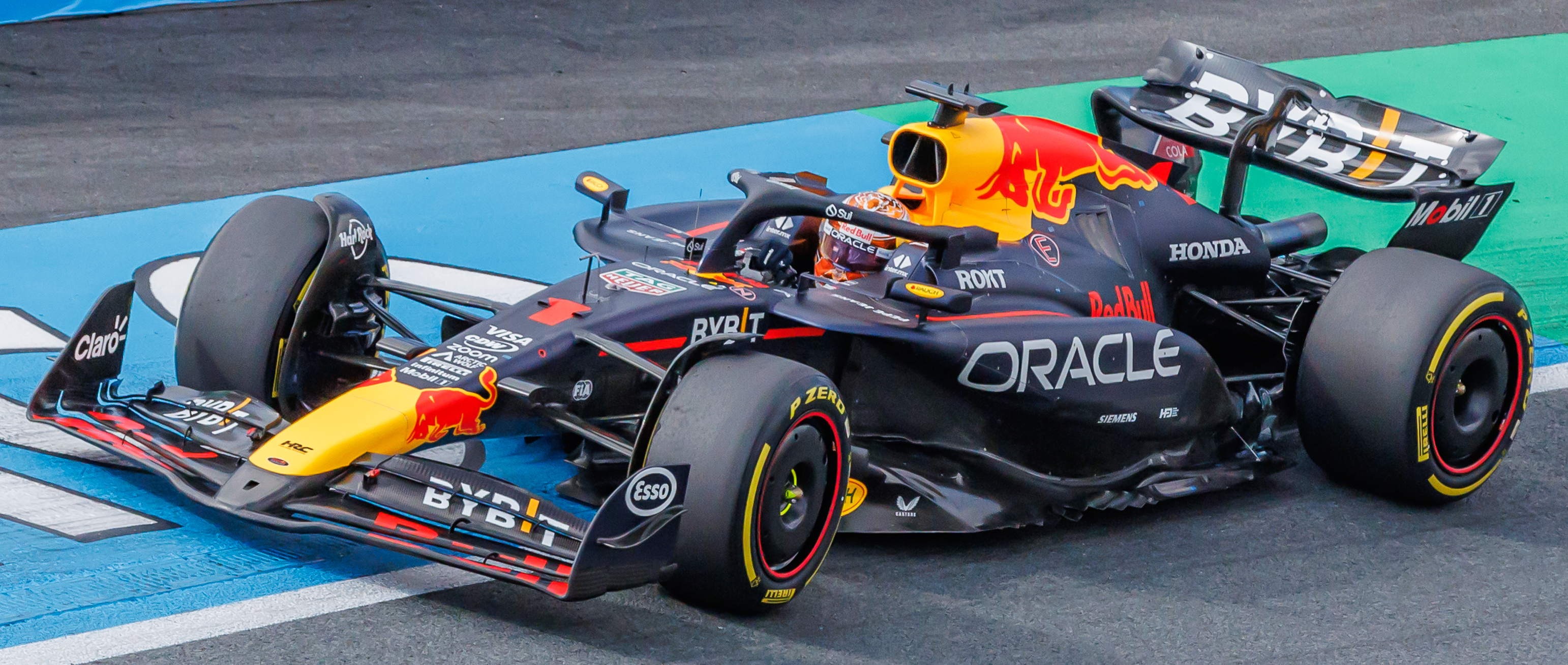
Newey's first championship-winning chassis from each of his teams, and his most recent: Williams FW14B (1992), McLaren MP4/13 (1998), Red Bull RB6 (2010), and Red Bull RB20 (2024)

Newey-designed chassis have won 12 World Constructors' Championships and 14 World Drivers' Championships, including four consecutive Constructors' titles from 2010 to 2013 with Red Bull. Newey has made 40 entries as a lead designer in Formula One, (Note: Including three entries with Toro Rosso from 2007 to 2009.) winning World Championships with 15 and Grands Prix with 31 as of 2026. As a result of his accomplishment and successful car designs, Newey is widely recognised among the greatest engineers in the history of Formula One, being described as Formula One's "design genius", with some arguing his case as the most successful designer.

Season	World Championship		Chassis	Engine	Statistics					
Season	Constructors'	Drivers'	Chassis	Engine	Races	Wins	Poles	F/Laps	Podiums	WCC
1988	Newey becomes chief designer at March									
1988	—		881	Judd	18 (Note: March also used the 881 at the opening two Grands Prix of the 1989 season.)	0	0	0	3	6th
1989	—		CG891	Judd	14	0	0	1*	0	12th
1990	March becomes Leyton House with Newey promoted to technical director									
1990	—		CG901	Judd	16	0	0	0	1*	7th
1991	Newey moves to Williams as chief designer									
1991	—		FW14	Renault	16	7	6	8	17	2nd
1992	(United Kingdom) Williams	(United Kingdom) Nigel Mansell	FW14B	Renault	16	10	15*	11*	21	1st
1993	(United Kingdom) Williams (2)	(France) Alain Prost	FW15C	Renault	16	10	15*	10	22*	1st
1994	(United Kingdom) Williams (3)	—N/a	FW16	Renault	16	7	6	8	13	1st
1995	—		FW17	Renault	17	5	12	6	17	2nd
1996	(United Kingdom) Williams (4)	(United Kingdom) Damon Hill	FW18	Renault	16	12*	12	11*	21	1st
1997	(United Kingdom) Williams (5)	(Canada) Jacques Villeneuve	FW19	Renault	17	8	11	9	15	1st
1998	Newey moves to McLaren as technical director									
1998	(United Kingdom) McLaren	(Finland) Mika Häkkinen	MP4/13	Mercedes	16	9	12	9	20	1st
1999	—N/a	(Finland) Mika Häkkinen (2)	MP4/14	Mercedes	16	7	11	9	16	2nd
2000	—		MP4/15	Mercedes	17	7	7	12*	22	2nd
2001	—		MP4-16	Mercedes	17	4	2	6	13	2nd
2002	—		MP4-17	Mercedes	17	1	0	2	10	3rd
2003	—		MP4-17D	Mercedes	16	2	2	3	13	3rd
2004	—		MP4-19	Mercedes	18	1	1	2	4	5th
2005	—		MP4-20	Mercedes	19	10	7	12*	18	2nd
2006	—		MP4-21	Mercedes	18	0	3	3	9	3rd
2007	Newey moves to Red Bull as CTO									
2007	—		RB3; STR2 (Note: As CTO of Red Bull, Newey also designed the Toro Rosso chassis from 2007 to 2009; as variants of their parent team counterparts.)	Renault; Ferrari (Note: Between 2007 and 2009, Red Bull competed with Renault engines, whilst Toro Rosso competed with Ferrari engines.)	17	0	0	0	1	5th (Note: Best result achieved by Red Bull; Toro Rosso finished 7th in 2007.)
2008	—		RB4; STR3	Renault; Ferrari	18	1 (Note: One win achieved by Sebastian Vettel for Toro Rosso.)	1 (Note: One pole position achieved by Sebastian Vettel for Toro Rosso.)	0	2 (Note: Including one podium achieved by Sebastian Vettel for Toro Rosso.)	6th (Note: Best result achieved by Toro Rosso; Red Bull finished 7th in 2008.)
2009	—		RB5; STR4	Renault; Ferrari	17	6	5	6	16	2nd (Note: Best result achieved by Red Bull; Toro Rosso finished 10th in 2009.)
2010	(Austria) Red Bull	(Germany) Sebastian Vettel	RB6	Renault	19	9	15	6	20	1st
2011	(Austria) Red Bull (2)	(Germany) Sebastian Vettel (2)	RB7	Renault	19	12	18*	10	27	1st
2012	(Austria) Red Bull (3)	(Germany) Sebastian Vettel (3)	RB8	Renault	20	7	8	7	14	1st
2013	(Austria) Red Bull (4)	(Germany) Sebastian Vettel (4)	RB9	Renault	19	13	11	12*	24	1st
2014	—		RB10	Renault	19	3	0	3	12	2nd
2015	—		RB11	Renault	19	0	0	3	3	4th
2016	—		RB12	TAG Heuer (Note: From 2016 to 2018, Red Bull competed using Renault power units rebadged to "TAG Heuer" for sponsorship purposes.)	21	2	1	5	16	2nd
2017	—		RB13	TAG Heuer	20	3	0	2	13	3rd
2018	—		RB14	TAG Heuer	21	4	2	6	13	3rd
2019	—		RB15	Honda	21	3	2	5	9	3rd
2020	—		RB16	Honda	17	2	1	3	13	2nd
2021	—N/a	(Netherlands) Max Verstappen	RB16B	Honda	22	11	10	8	23	2nd
2022	(Austria) Red Bull (5)	(Netherlands) Max Verstappen (2)	RB18	RBPT	22	17	8	8	28	1st
2023	(Austria) Red Bull (6)	(Netherlands) Max Verstappen (3)	RB19	Honda RBPT	22	21†	14	11	30*	1st
2024	—N/a	(Netherlands) Max Verstappen (4)	RB20	Honda RBPT	24	9	8	4	18	3rd
2024	Newey departs Red Bull and enters gardening leave									
2025	Newey moves to Aston Martin as team principal, technical director, and co-owner									
2026	—		AMR26	Honda	20	0	0	0	0	10th

Key: (Bold) Personal record; (*) constructor record; (†) Formula One record

=== Other motorsport championships ===
==== IMSA GT Championship ====
- IMSA GT Championship: 1983, 1984 (as a designer)
- 24 Hours of Daytona: 1984 (as a designer)

==== CART IndyCar ====
- CART IndyCar World Series: 1985, 1986 (as a designer)
- Indianapolis 500: 1985, 1986 (as a designer)

=== Orders and special awards ===
- United Kingdom
  - Officer of the Order of the British Empire (2012)

==== Honorary degrees ====
- Doctor of Science, University of Sussex (2013)
- Doctor of Engineering, Oxford Brookes University (2013)

== Bibliography ==
- How to Build a Car (2017)

== 24 Hours of Le Mans results ==
Year	Team	Co-Drivers	Car	Class	Laps	Pos.	Class Pos.
2007	(Italy) AF Corse (United Kingdom) Aucott Racing	(United Kingdom) Joe Macari (United Kingdom) Ben Aucott	Ferrari F430 GT2	GT2	308	22nd	4th
