= March 82G =

Sports prototype race car

- Category: Group C/IMSA GTP
- Constructor: March Engineering
- Successor: March 83G

Technical specifications
- Chassis: Honeycomb aluminium monocoque with semi-stressed engine
- Axle track: 1,565 mm (61.6 in) (front); 1,539 mm (60.6 in) (rear)
- Wheelbase: 2,685 mm (105.7 in)
- Engine: Chevrolet 5.7 L (347.8 cu in) V8 engine naturally-aspirated mid-engined
- Transmission: 5-speed manual
- Weight: 900 kg (1,984.2 lb)

Competition history
- Debut: 1984 24 Hours of Daytona
Races	Wins	Podiums
55	1	8

The March 82G is a IMSA GTP/Group C sports prototype race car, designed, developed and built by British manufacturer and constructor March Engineering, for sports car racing (specifically the IMSA GT Championship and World Sportscar Championship), in 1982. It competed in motor racing between 1982 and 1986, but only scored 1 race win, 8 podium finishes, and 2 pole positions. It was powered by a naturally-aspirated 620 hp (460 kW) 5.7 L (350 cu in) Chevrolet V8 engine.
