= Giles Wood =

South African engineer

- Education: University of Cambridge; University of the Witwatersrand
- Occupation: Engineer
- Employer: Aston Martin F1 Team
- Known for: Formula One engineer
- Title: Simulation and modelling director

Giles Wood is a South African Formula One and motorsport engineer. He is currently the simulation and modelling director at the Aston Martin F1 Team.

== Career ==
Wood studied mechanical engineering at the University of the Witwatersrand, before completing a PhD in engineering at the University of Cambridge. He began his professional career as a Principal Software Engineer at MathWorks, where he worked on advanced modelling and simulation tools such as MATLAB and Simulink, which are widely used across the automotive and motorsport sectors.

Wood moved into Formula One in 2004 with McLaren Racing as Simulation Lead, contributing to the development of the pioneering seamless shift transmission system used on the McLaren MP4-20 and the team’s driver-in-the-loop simulator. He later followed Technical Director Adrian Newey to Red Bull Racing, becoming Head of Simulation and taking responsibility for developing the team’s in-house simulator in Milton Keynes. He was promoted to Chief Engineer, Simulation and Analysis at the start of the 2010 season, playing a key role in the organisation that secured four consecutive Drivers’ and Constructors’ Championships from 2010 to 2013.

In 2014, Wood transitioned to Red Bull Advanced Technologies as Technical Director, where he applied high-performance modelling and simulation expertise to projects beyond Formula One, including the Aston Martin Valkyrie, again working closely with Newey. In 2017, Wood left motorsport to join Apple as a Senior Engineering Manager within its Autonomous Technologies group, focusing on vehicle automation and systems modelling.

Wood returned to Formula One in 2025 with the Aston Martin F1 Team as Simulation and Vehicle Modelling Director, reuniting once again with Newey. In this role, he oversees simulation, modelling and analysis capabilities supporting the team’s cars development programmes.
