= Rob Gray (engineer) =

British engineer

- Education: Swansea University (BSc)
- Occupation: Engineer
- Years active: 2002–2020
- Employer: Red Bull Advanced Technologies
- Known for: Formula One engineer
- Title: Technical Director

Rob Gray is a British Formula One engineer who currently serves as the Technical Director at Red Bull Advanced Technologies.

== Career ==
Gray graduated from Swansea University with a degree in Mechanical Engineering. He began his motorsport career with Jaguar Racing working as a Structures Analyst. When the team transitioned into Red Bull Racing he became a project engineer, before being the group leader of development in 2006. The following year he was appointed Head of Drivetrain Engineering, being responsible for transmission, clutch and rear axis. In 2009 Gray was appointed Head of R&D Projects, having responsibilities over special projects such as the KERS system and innovative FRIC suspension concept.

In October 2014, Gray was appointed Chief Designer at Red Bull, replacing Rob Marshall who was promoted to Chief Engineering Officer. In this role, Gray became responsible for the entire chassis design for the team, until November 2020. He has since become Technical director at Red Bull Advanced Technology - overseeing engineering delivery across a portfolio of projects beyond Formula One, including leading the design for the Red Bull RB17 hypercar.
