= Rob Marshall (motorsport) =

British engineer

- Born: 14 April 1968 (age 58); Taunton, England
- Occupation: Engineer
- Employer: McLaren
- Known for: Formula One engineer
- Title: Chief Technical Officer and Chief Designer

Rob Marshall (born 14 April 1968) is a British Formula One engineer for McLaren, being their Chief Technical Officer and Chief Designer leading their technical team after initially being hired as the Technical Director for Engineering and Design. He previously had a leading role in the Red Bull Racing team from 2006-2023.

== Career ==
Marshall studied mechanical engineering at Cardiff University. After his study, he went to work at the design department of Rolls-Royce.

He switched to Benetton Formula as a race engineer in 1994. He continued working for Benetton until the take over by Renault F1 team. Through a duration in which the team was taken over by Renault (2000–2002), Marshall worked his way through the ranks to eventually become Head of Mechanical Design and in 2005, his work, particularly the development of his innovative mass damper system, helped the team to its first Drivers' and Constructors’ Championship titles.

For the 2006 season, Marshall moved to the new Red Bull Racing team, where he worked with Adrian Newey in the role of Chief Designer. Here he had a key role in the cars that won 4 world titles between 2010 and 2013 with Sebastian Vettel. The introduction of hybrid engines to F1 led to a less successful spell, but with Marshall at the helm of the Red Bull's engineering department the podiums and victories have continued to flow. In 2016 Marshall was promoted to the position of chief engineering officer.

On 30 May 2023, it was announced that after a 17-year tenure with Red Bull Racing, Marshall would be leaving the team and joining McLaren as the Technical Director responsible for Engineering and Design, beginning in January 2024 after a period of gardening leave. However, after just three months this role was changed to that of Chief Designer as part of a technical restructuring at McLaren which involved David Sanchez, Technical Director for Car Concept and Performance, leaving the team.
