= William Royce =

William Royce may refer to:

- William Royce (politician), English politician
- William James Royce, American playwright, director, screenwriter, and novelist
- William Hobart Royce, American writer and bookseller
- Bill Royce, college football player

== See also ==
- Royce (disambiguation)
