= Red Bull RB8 =

Formula One racing car

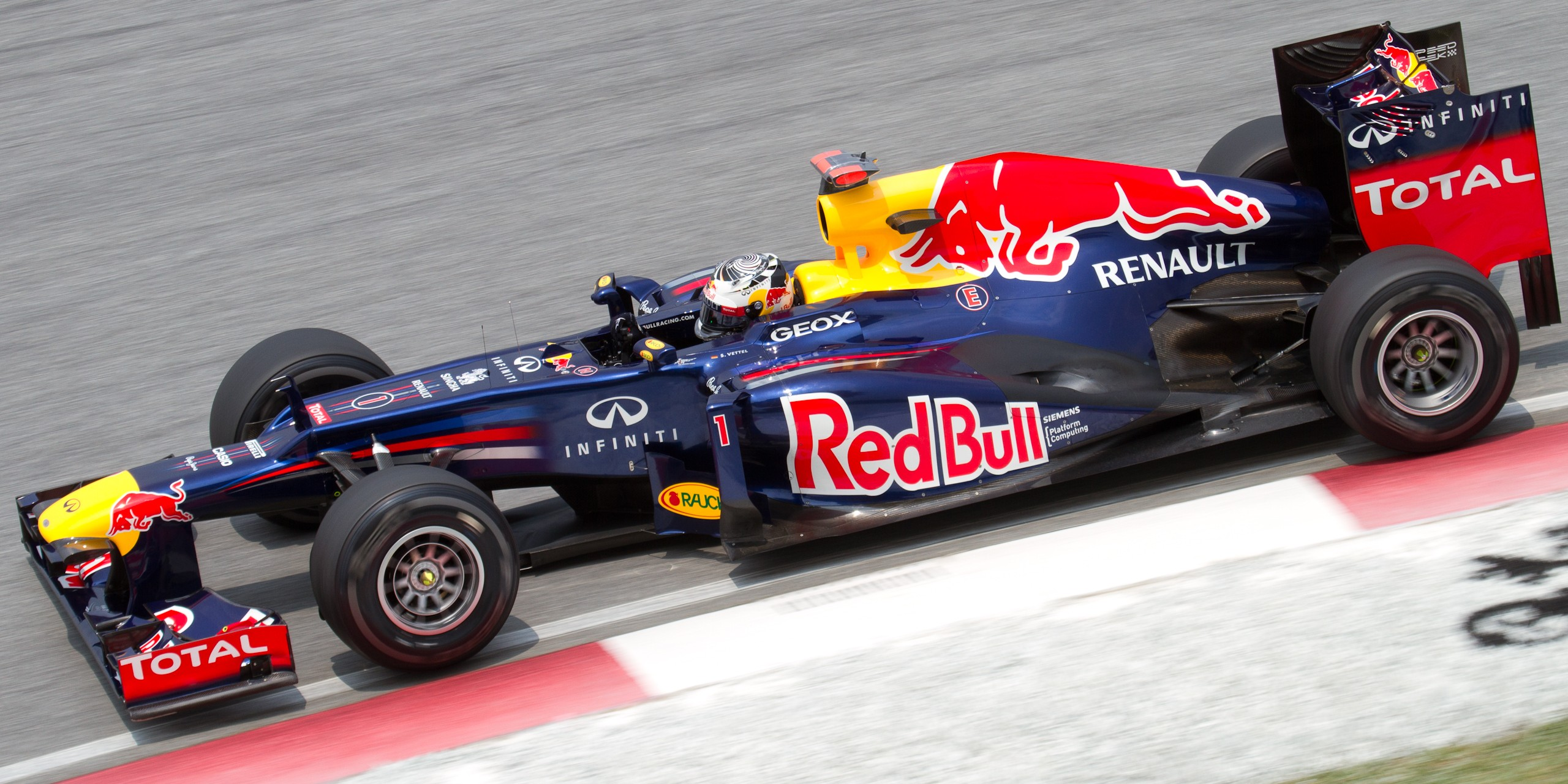
- Sebastian Vettel driving the RB8 at the 2012 Malaysian Grand Prix
- Category: Formula One
- Constructor: Red Bull
- Designers: Adrian Newey (Chief Technical Officer); Rob Marshall (Chief Designer); Mark Ellis (Chief Engineer, Performance); Giles Wood (Chief Engineer, Simulation and Analysis); Steve Winstanley (Deputy Chief Designer, Composites and Structures); David Worner (Deputy Chief Designer, Mechanics and Suspension); Rob Gray (Head of R&D); Peter Prodromou (Chief Engineer, Aerodynamics); Dan Fallows (Chief Aerodynamicist)
- Predecessor: Red Bull RB7
- Successor: Red Bull RB9

Technical specifications
- Chassis: Carbon composite monocoque, incorporating the engine as a fully stressed member
- Suspension (front): Carbon composite double wishbone suspension
- Suspension (rear): As front
- Engine: Renault RS27-2012 2,400 cc (146.5 cu in) 90° V8, limited to 18,000 RPM, with KERS, naturally aspirated, mid-mounted 750 hp @ 18,000 rpm
- Transmission: Red Bull 7-speed, hydraulic power shift
- Fuel: Total
- Tyres: Pirelli P Zero (dry) and Cinturato (wet); 13" diameter OZ wheels (front and rear)

Competition history
- Notable drivers: 1. (Germany) Sebastian Vettel; 2. (Australia) Mark Webber
- Debut: 2012 Australian Grand Prix
- First win: 2012 Bahrain Grand Prix
- Last win: 2012 Indian Grand Prix
- Last event: 2012 Brazilian Grand Prix
Races	Wins	Podiums	Poles	F/Laps
20	7	14	8	7
- Constructors' Championships: 1 (2012)
- Drivers' Championships: 1 (2012, Sebastian Vettel)

The Red Bull RB8 is a Formula One racing car designed by Red Bull Racing which competed in the 2012 Formula One season. The car was driven by reigning World Drivers' Champion Sebastian Vettel, and Mark Webber, with former Scuderia Toro Rosso driver Sébastien Buemi filling the role of test driver. The car was launched online on 6 February, and made its debut at the first pre-season test at Jerez.

== Design ==
Before the start of the season, it was reported that the team were in no hurry to copy the reactive ride-height system developed by Lotus into the design of the RB8. Team principal Christian Horner stated that "things have to work as a package rather than as individual components". The system was later banned by the FIA. Like most 2012-specification cars, the RB8 features a 'stepped-nose' to conform with new regulations to improve safety in the event of a collision with another car. The RB8 features a slot cut into the step of the nose section, although Adrian Newey claimed this has no use other than to aid cooling for the driver.

Sebastian Vettel, who (since joining Scuderia Toro Rosso) makes it a habit to give his racing cars names, named his RB8 'Abbey'. Its name is based neither on his favourite band's album Abbey Road, nor on the famous Silverstone corner. According to him, "it's just a cool name".

=== Legality ===
The legality of the RB8 would become an ongoing theme as the 2012 season progressed. Before the Monaco Grand Prix, several teams complained over the legality of a slot in the rear floor of the RB8. However, Red Bull dismissed claims and pointed out that the hole was within the regulations, as the part in question has been introduced at the Bahrain Grand Prix and had subsequently passed every scrutineering session. Nevertheless, the FIA passed regulation changes before the Canadian Grand Prix that outlawed the use of a hole in the floor, forcing the team to change its design.

The team was involved in a second, more serious dispute at the German Grand Prix when FIA Technical Delegate Jo Bauer referred the team to the race stewards over what he felt was an illegal throttle map. The 2011 season saw teams produce more downforce by programming their engines to force more air through the exhaust and over the diffuser. This practice was banned for 2012, with the regulations dictating the position of the exhaust outlet and requiring teams to observe a linear relationship between the degree to which the throttle was opened and the amount of torque being produced by the car. Red Bull were accused of abusing this relationship in medium-speed corners, allowing their throttle to be more open than it should be for the amount of torque being produced. This would allow more air to flow through the engine and out the exhaust, which was angled to direct exhaust gasses towards the diffuser. Although the effect was less than that created in 2011, Bauer felt that this practice had the potential to produce more downforce, and even serve as a rudimentary form of traction control if applied under certain conditions. The race stewards cleared Red Bull of any wrongdoing, stating that the team had not broken any of the rules, and the team was permitted to start the race. However, the FIA passed further regulation changes ahead of the Hungarian Grand Prix, once again forcing Red Bull to make changes to their car.

A third dispute came less than a week later, as the teams prepared to race in Hungary. Red Bull were accused of having illegally made changes to the ride height of their car while under parc fermé conditions at the Canadian Grand Prix after the FIA asked them to make changes to the RB8. The technical regulations at the time dictated that any adjustments to the ride height of the car must be made with the use of a tool, but the FIA had requested that the team change a part of the car that would enable them to change the front ride height by hand. Team principal Christian Horner admitted that the team had been asked to change the offending part, but denied that the team had illegally changed the front ride height of their cars after qualifying for the race.

== Season review ==
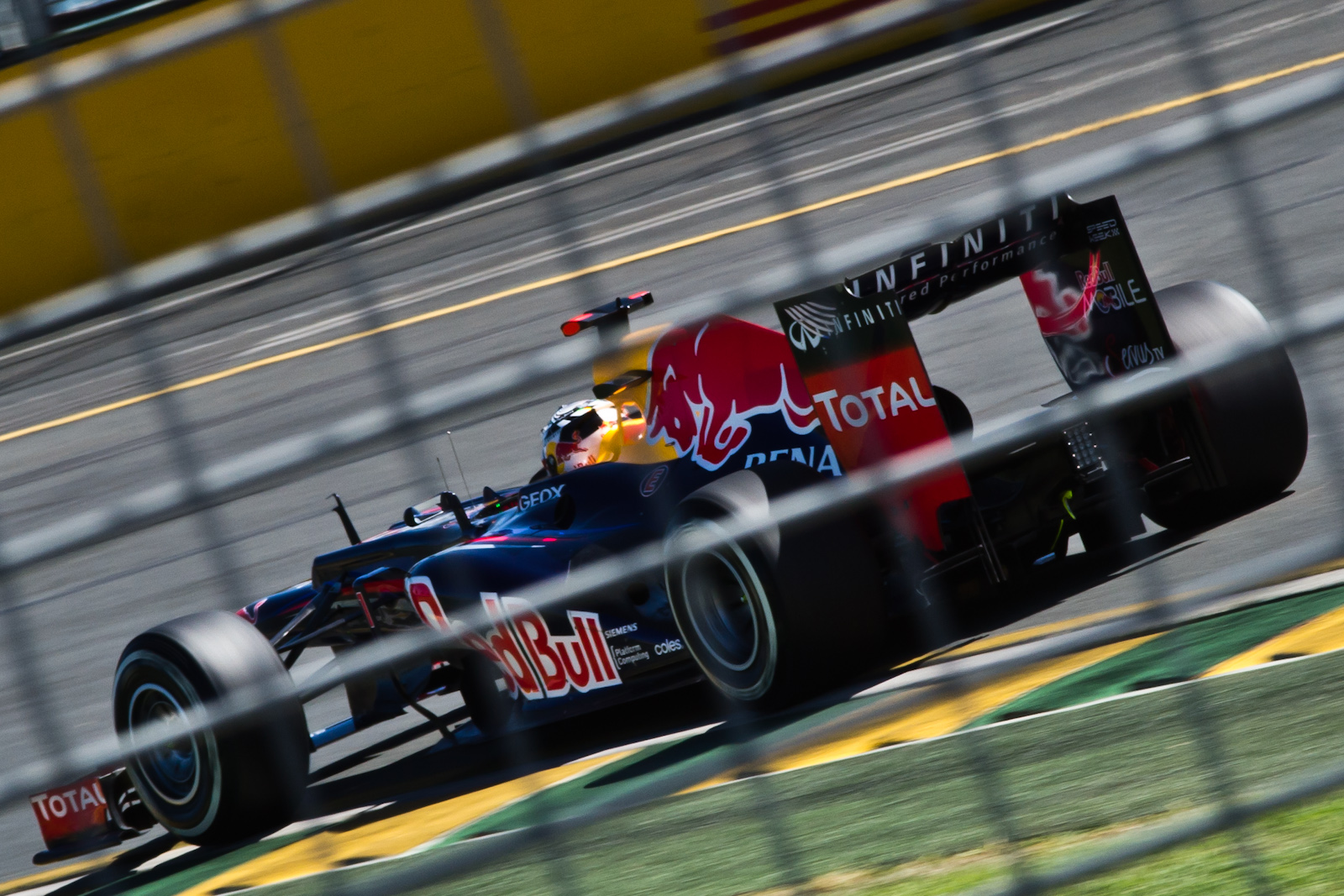
The RB8 debuted at the Australian Grand Prix and scored a podium in the hands of Sebastian Vettel.

After three pre-season tests, one in Jerez and two in Barcelona, the RB8 arrived at the opening round of the 2012 Formula One season and its first race - the Australian Grand Prix. Webber and Vettel qualified the car on the third row of the grid, setting the fifth and sixth fastest times respectively. During the race their pace improved in comparison to the other cars, allowing Vettel to finish second, and Webber fourth. At the following round, in Malaysia, the cars had a similar qualifying performance to Australia, but wet weather prevented them from replicating the previous race result. Vettel, running in fourth place with a handful of laps to go, was involved in a collision which resulted in a puncture, placing him outside the points. Webber inherited the fourth place. The Chinese Grand Prix had a difficult qualifying in store for the RB8, in which Webber was seventh and Vettel ended up down in eleventh place. The two drivers gained places in the race though, with Webber overtaking Vettel on the final lap to take fourth place, leaving Vettel fifth.

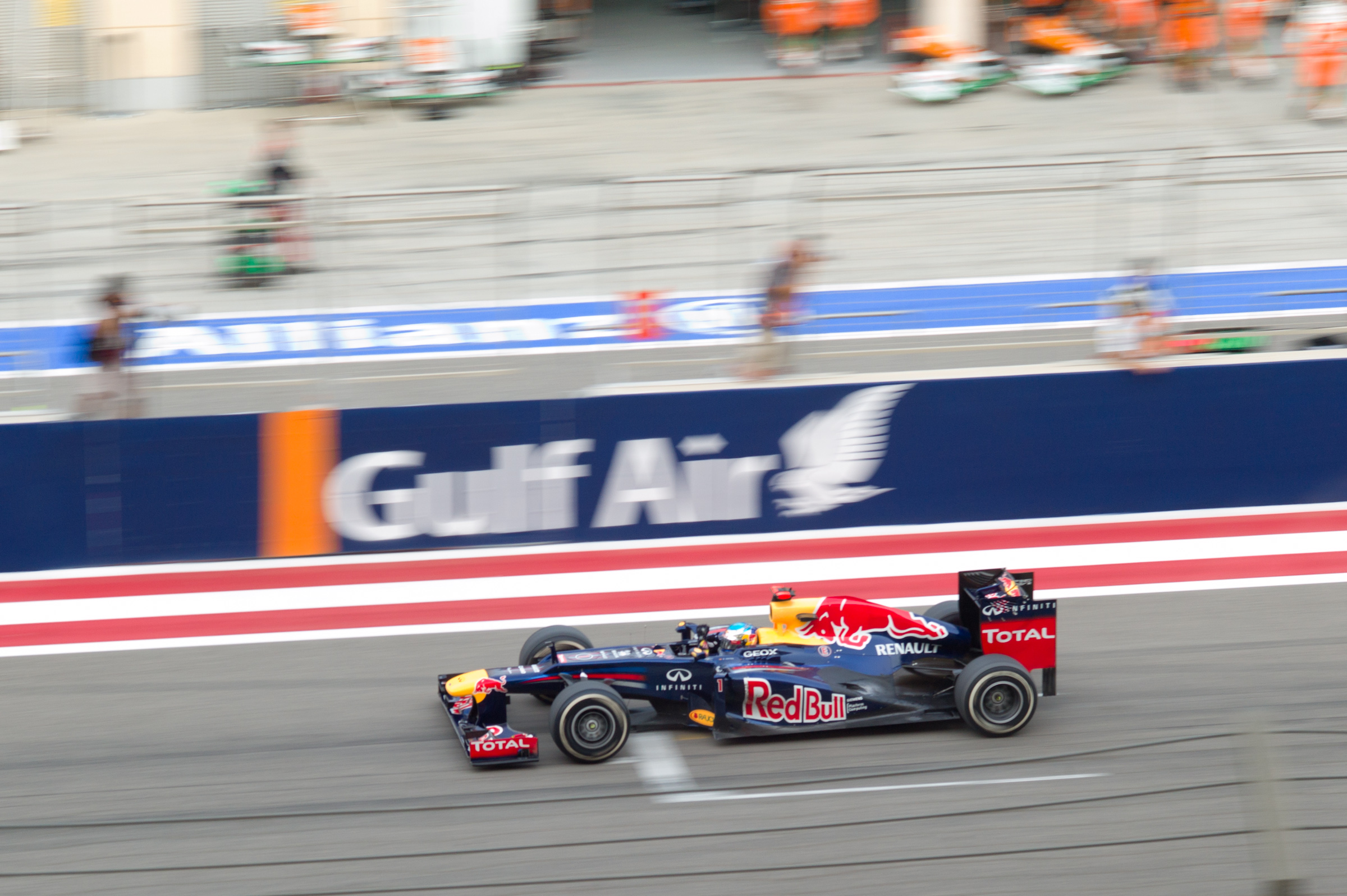
Vettel took the RB8's first victory of the 2012 season at the Bahrain Grand Prix, after taking its first pole position the previous day.

The 2012 Bahrain Grand Prix was the race at which the RB8 took its first pole position and victory, both courtesy of Vettel. He led all of the race, excluding the pit stop phases, despite pressure from the two Lotus cars. Webber, after qualifying third, finished the race behind these two cars to take his fourth successive fourth place in as many races. The result of the race moved Vettel into the lead of the Drivers' Championship and Red Bull into the lead of the Constructors' Championship for the first time in the season.

The Spanish Grand Prix was the first race after the only allowed in-season test at the Mugello Circuit. The RB8 did not enjoy a weekend as successful as its last though, with Webber starting the race eleventh and Vettel seventh. Webber finished in the same place he started and Vettel gained one place to finish sixth after both drivers had to pit for the pit crew to replace the front wings on their cars due to a problem. Two weeks later at the Monaco Grand Prix, things were looking far better for the team, as Webber took pole position after Michael Schumacher was penalised. Vettel, for the second race in succession, intentionally did not complete a full timed lap in the final part of qualifying, and started ninth. Webber eventually won the race to take the team's third successive win in the principality, while Vettel moved up to fourth and finished just 1.3 seconds behind the winner. Despite Webber becoming the sixth driver to win a race in the first six races, and the RB8 becoming the only car to win multiple races, it was becoming clearer who the team's rivals for the championship title would be. The McLaren MP4-27, the Ferrari F2012, the Mercedes F1 W03 and the Lotus E20 joined the RB8 near the top of the Constructors' Championship, and looked likely to make a bid for the title; other cars like the Williams FW34 and the Sauber C31 had produced good results, but looked unlikely to make a title challenge. Also, as a consequence of the race, Vettel lost his lead in the Drivers' championship.

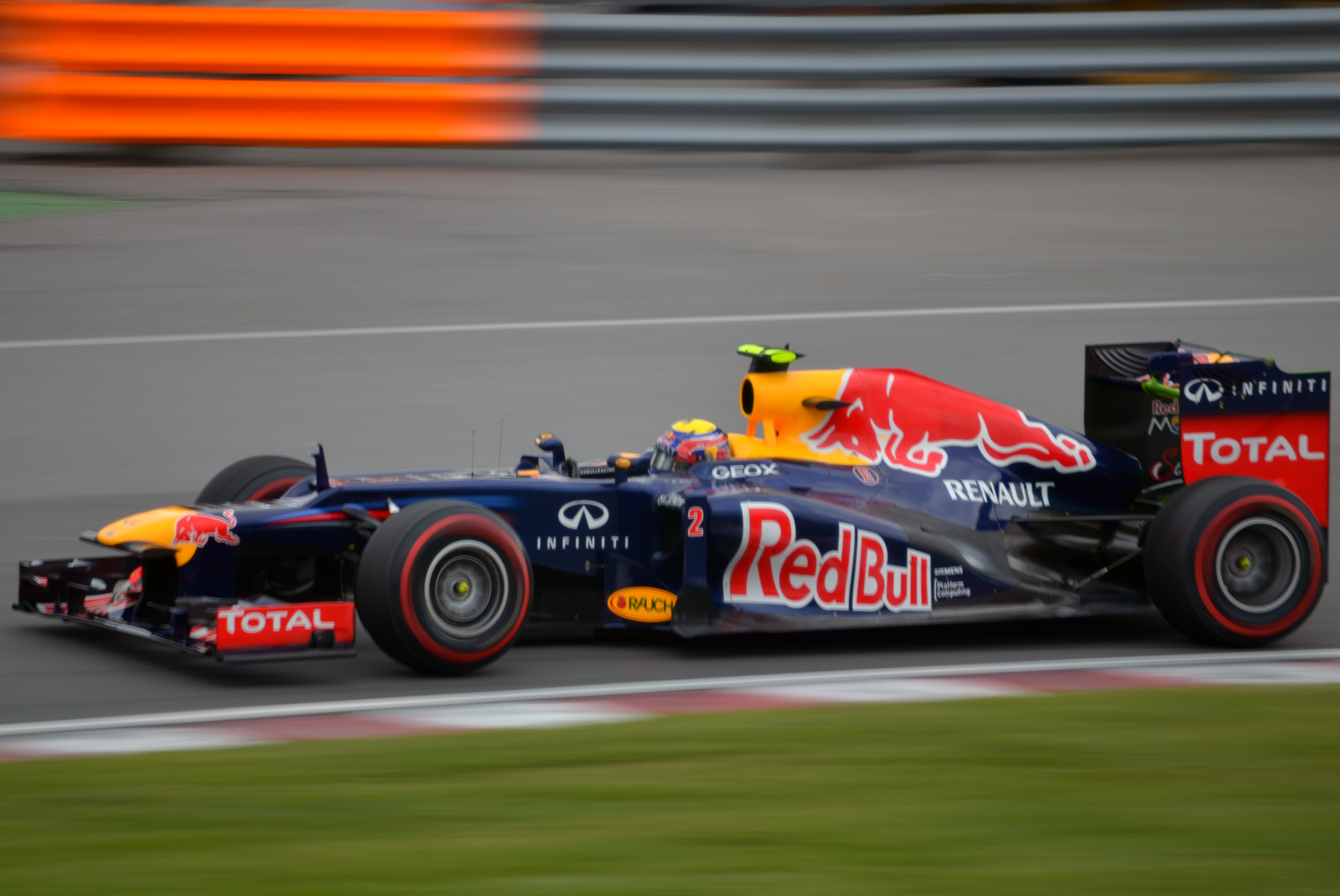
Mark Webber finished the Canadian Grand Prix in seventh position.

After the FIA had deemed a hole in the floor of the RB8 illegal, the team had arrived at the Canadian Grand Prix with a slightly altered car. Vettel qualified on pole position, and after a close fight with Hamilton and Alonso for the majority of the race, finished fourth after making an extra stop due to poor tyre degradation. Webber encountered similar problems and dropped to seventh after starting fourth. Hamilton became the seventh winner in seven races and took over the lead in the drivers' standings as a result. At the following race, the European Grand Prix, Vettel qualified in pole position for the third time in 2012, three tenths faster than Hamilton. Webber qualified in a lowly nineteenth position, but fought back during the race to finish an impressive fourth; Vettel retired from the lead on lap 33, with an alternator failure which would become a recurring issue for Renault engines and particularly the RB8, having led the whole race up to that point.

At the British Grand Prix, Webber qualified in second and Vettel was fourth at a wet Silverstone, where new championship leader Alonso took his first pole position of the season. Webber overtook Alonso for the lead of the race with a handful of laps remaining and Vettel finished in third place after losing ground at the start and making it back up to finish 5 seconds behind Webber. The German Grand Prix at the Hockenheimring was won by Alonso from pole position. Vettel and Webber qualified well behind him in second and third respectively, but Webber dropped down to eighth throughout the race. Vettel was running in third place in the closing moments of the race when he made a controversial manoeuvre around the outside of Jenson Button to take second place, where he appeared on the podium. After the race, however, Vettel was issued a penalty which dropped him to fifth because his car was completely off the track during the overtake. The 2012 Hungarian Grand Prix was the eleventh and last round of the season before the Summer break. Hamilton qualified in pole position and won the race, whilst Vettel started third, but finished fourth and Webber started eleventh and finished eighth. This left Webber and Vettel second and third in the Drivers' Championship, only two points apart but forty adrift of Alonso. Hamilton and Räikkönen also remained title contenders with Button slipping further behind. Red Bull led the Constructors' Championship and were firm favourites holding a 53-point lead over McLaren. Lotus and Ferrari were also contenders as both were within 3 points of McLaren; Mercedes's poor mid season had left them trailing.

Over one month later, Formula One returned to Spa-Francorchamps for the Belgian Grand Prix. Vettel missed out on Q3 and qualified in eleventh for the second time in 2012, whilst Webber did slightly better to take eighth. Starting tenth on the grid, Vettel moved up to second during the race helped by a large collision at the start. Webber finished sixth as polesitter Button took the race victory, showing an improved McLaren pace. This improved pace in the RB8's main rival continued at the Italian Grand Prix as Hamilton took the McLaren MP4-27 to its third successive victory. After Vettel and Webber took sixth and eleventh respectively during qualifying, the team suffered their first double retirement since the 2010 Korean Grand Prix. Vettel suffered another alternator failure and Webber spun violently at the Ascari chicane, with the resultant damage to his tyres sending vibrations through the car that forced him to retire.

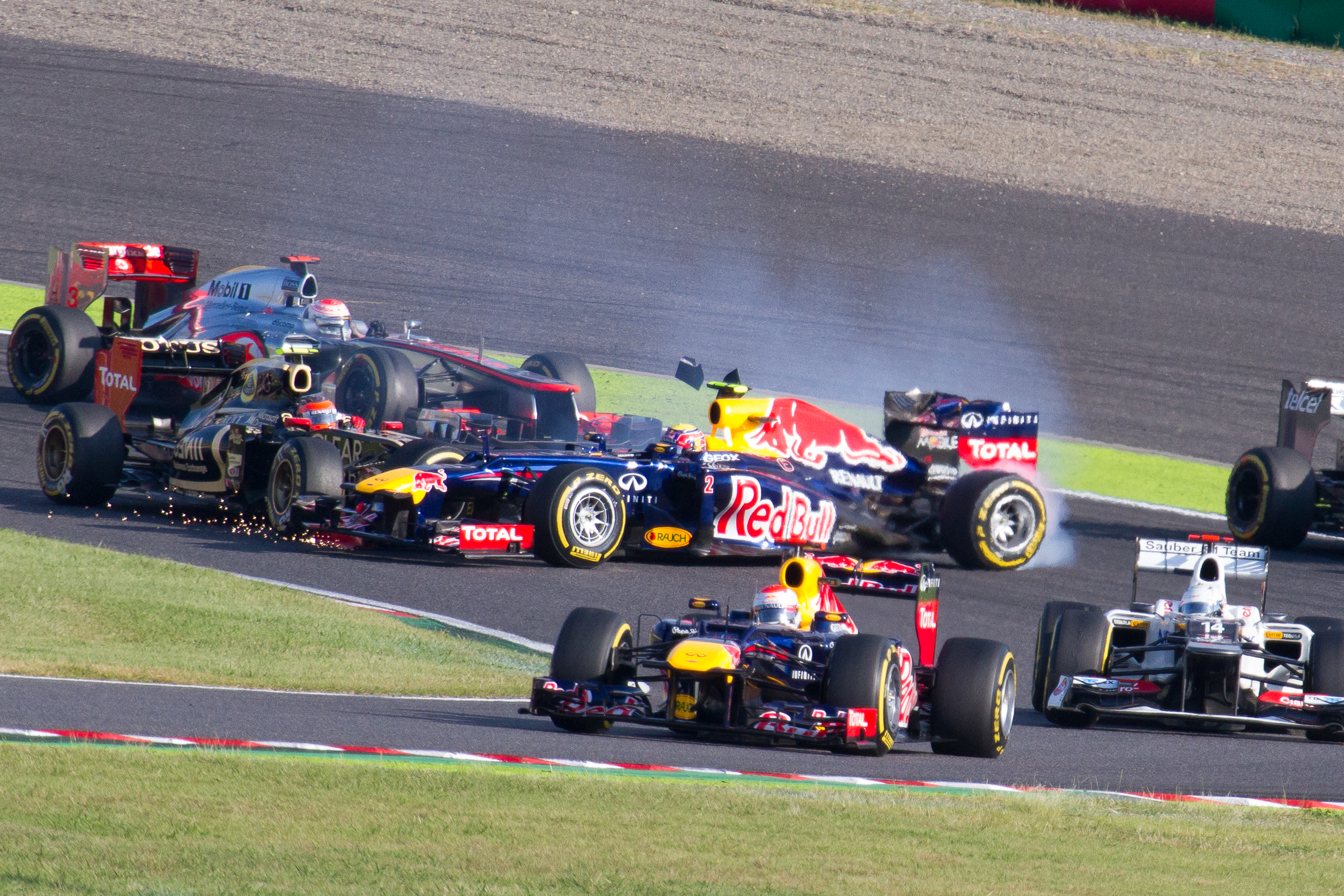
Vettel became the first driver to win consecutive races in 2012 and took the championship lead in Japan; Webber was pushed off track by Romain Grosjean on the first lap before he recovered to ninth place.

Red Bull arrived in Singapore with a new "double-DRS" device fitted on the car. The system had been used by Mercedes near the start of the season, causing a stir due to an effect it created similar to that of the F-duct system, banned after 2010 season. The teams unanimously agreed to ban its use for the 2013 season after the Hungarian Grand Prix, but despite this Lotus made a version which they attempted to use before Red Bull. McLaren still looked to have a strong car with Hamilton in pole. Vettel and Webber qualified third and seventh respectively, and after Hamilton's gearbox failed when he was leading the race, Vettel inherited the victory. Webber finished in eleventh after taking a time penalty and losing the tenth place slot he initially finished in. The RB8, like the previous three of its predecessors, seemed very well suited the Suzuka Circuit at the Japanese Grand Prix. Vettel took pole position and Webber qualified second to take the team's first row lock-out of the season. Vettel led every lap of the race, and set the fastest lap, to become the first driver to take successive wins in the 2012 season. Webber lost one place at the first corner and then was spun by Romain Grosjean meaning he had to fight his way through the grid to finish ninth. As a consequence of Alonso's retirement at the start, Vettel narrowed the gap between himself and the Ferrari driver from 29 to just 4 points in the drivers' standings with 5 races remaining. Webber remained just in contention behind Räikkönen and Hamilton. Red Bull remained a healthy lead in the Constructors' standings over McLaren and Ferrari.

At the Korean Grand Prix, the Red Bull cars once again achieved a front row lock-out, except the cars were reversed with Webber in pole position. Vettel took the lead at the first corner, though, and took the victory and a 6-point championship lead whilst Webber completed a 1–2. Vettel's main rival for the title, Alonso, finished third in a Ferrari with improved pace, but was still at a disadvantage in terms of pace to Red Bull and McLaren. At the Indian Grand Prix, Vettel took pole and Webber qualified second to take the team's third successive front row lock-out. It was the first time Red Bull had done this, and the first time anyone had since 2007. Vettel led the race from start to finish, as he had done in Japan and Korea, and took his fourth consecutive win and his fifth of the season. Webber remained in second place for the majority of the race, but Alonso overtook him after he suffered a KERS problem near the end of the race. Webber held off Hamilton in the final two laps to remain on the podium.

== Sponsorship and livery ==
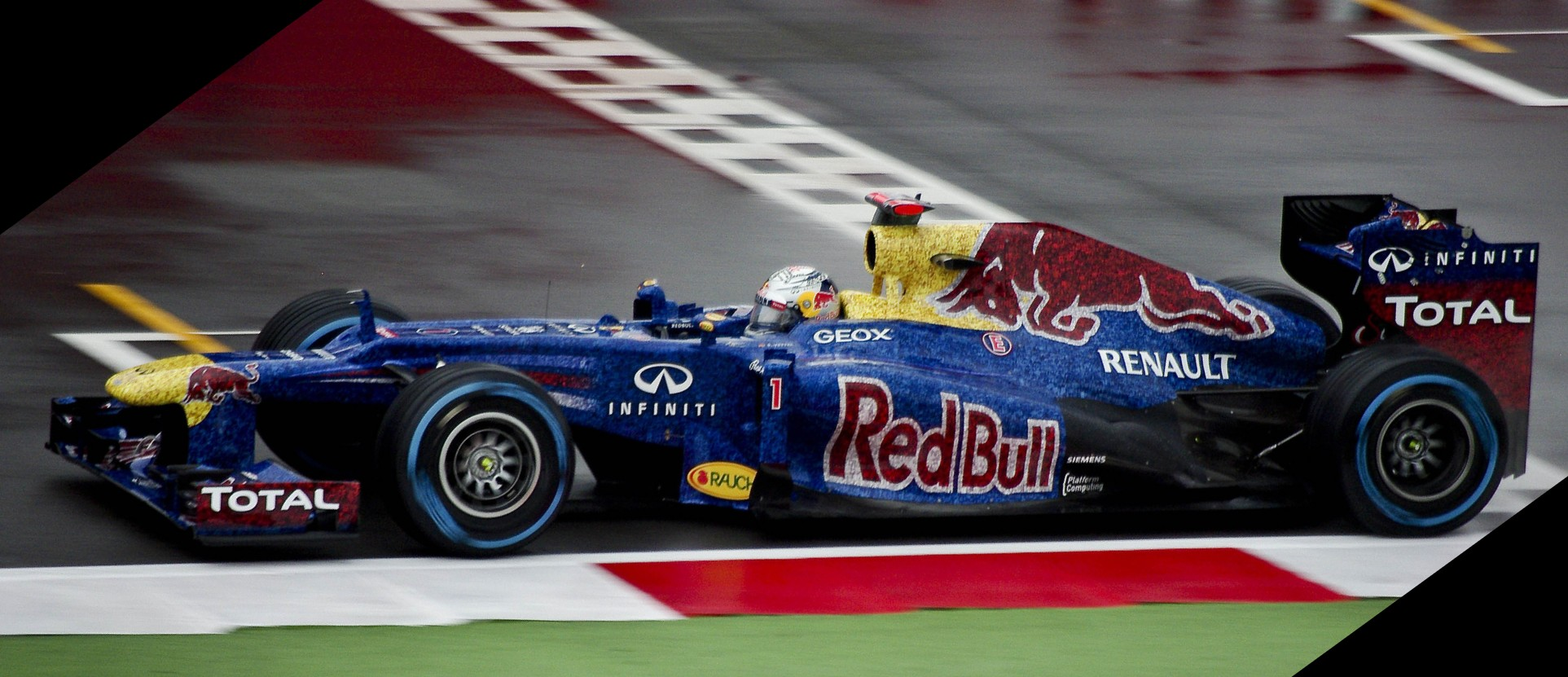
The RB8 ran a special livery at the British Grand Prix featuring photographs of fans to raise money for the Wings for Life foundation.

The livery is the same as the previous championship: blue with yellow inserts and light blue, yellow and grey stripes. The red bull, symbol of Red Bull, the main sponsor of the team, stands out on the car. Compared to previous models, the red inserts of the French oil company Total stand out on the wing strips and the Infiniti sponsors are more visible.

At the 2012 British Grand Prix, the livery featured 25,000 fan-submitted images for Wings For Life Foundation.

At the Korean Grand Prix, the CU logo could be seen on the bargeboard of the cars. At the Brazilian Grand Prix, the Brazilian telecommunications company Sky logo could be seen on the bargeboard of the cars.

== Later uses ==
After the 2012 season, just like its predecessor, the RB8 was frequently used in demonstrations and rewrapped in different liveries throughout the years:

- In 2018, MotoGP champion Marc Márquez and Dani Pedrosa driving the RB8 in the Toro Rosso STR13 livery at the Red Bull Ring circuit.
- On 5 March 2020, Max Verstappen driving the RB8 in the RB16 livery at the newly renovated Circuit Zandvoort.

The RB8 was also briefly used on drag racing against other cars presented by Carwow.

== Complete Formula One results ==
(key) (results in bold indicate pole position; results in italics indicate fastest lap)

Year	Entrant	Engine	Tyres	Drivers	1	2	3	4	5	6	7	8	9	10	11	12	13	14	15	16	17	18	19	20	Points	WCC
2012	Red Bull Racing	Renault RS27-2012	**P**		AUS	MAL	CHN	BHR	ESP	MON	CAN	EUR	GBR	GER	HUN	BEL	ITA	SIN	JPN	KOR	IND	ABU	USA	BRA	**460**	**1st**
2012	Red Bull Racing	Renault RS27-2012	**P**	(Germany) Sebastian Vettel	2	11	5	**1**	6	4	**4**	**Ret**	3	5	4	2	22^{†}	1	**1**	1	**1**	3	**2**	6	**460**	**1st**
2012	Red Bull Racing	Renault RS27-2012	**P**	(Australia) Mark Webber	4	4	4	4	11	**1**	7	4	1	8	8	6	20^{†}	11	9	**2**	3	Ret	Ret	4	**460**	**1st**

^{†} Driver failed to finish the race, but was classified as they had completed greater than 90% of the race distance.

Awards
Preceded by Red Bull RB7	Autosport; Racing Car Of The Year; 2012	Succeeded by Red Bull RB9
