= Royce (surname) =

Royce is a surname, and may refer to:

== B ==
- Bill Royce (born 1971), American college football player

== E ==
- Ed Royce (politician) (born 1951), American politician
- Eden Royce, American gothic horror writer
- E. W. Royce (1841–1926), British actor, singer and dancer
- Edward Royce (director) (1870–1964), English director and choreographer
- Edward Royce (director) (1870–1964), British director and choreographer of musical theatre
- Elwyn E. Royce (1868–1960), American politician

== G ==
- George E. Royce (1829–1903), American businessman

== H ==
- Henry Royce (1863–1933), Baronet Royce of Seaton, cofounder of the Rolls-Royce automobile company
- Homer Elihu Royce (1820–1891), American lawyer, politician and jurist

== J ==
- James Royce (composer)
- James Royce (Designated Survivor), fictional character
- John Royce (born 1944), British judge
- Josiah Royce (1855–1916), American historian and idealist philosopher
- Julian Royce (1866–1946), British stage and film actor

== K ==
- Kenneth Royce (Kenneth Royce Gandley) (1920–1997), English author
- Kenneth W. Royce, American libertarian author

== L ==
- Lionel Royce (1891–1946), Austrian-American actor of stage and screen

== M ==
- Marie Royce, American businesswoman, diplomat and educator
- Mike Royce (born 1964), American comedian, screenwriter and television producer

== P ==
- Peyton Royce (born 1992), Australian professional wrestler

== R ==
- Ralph Royce (1890–1965), United States Army Air Forces general during World War II
- Robert Royce (1914–2008), Australian botanist
- Robert Royce (arbitrator) (born 1969), Court Mediator and Arbitrator, International Court of Arbitration and Mediation Center
- Ruth Royce (1893–1971), American vaudeville performer and silent film actress

== S ==
- Sarah Royce (1819–1891), American writer, teacher and pioneer
- Simon Royce (born 1971), English footballer
- Stephen Royce (1787–1868), American lawyer, judge and politician
- Suzanne Royce (born 1946), American motor sports scrutineer

== W ==
- William Royce (politician), English politician
- William James Royce, American playwright, director, screenwriter, and novelist
- William Hobart Royce, American writer and bookseller
- Winston W. Royce (1929–1995), computer scientist
