= Steven Royce =

Steven or Stephen Royce may refer to:

- Stephen Royce, US politician
- Steven Royce House
- Steven Royce, character in Suburgatory

== See also ==
- Royce (disambiguation)
