= James Royce =

James Royce may refer to:

- James Royce (composer)
- James Royce (Designated Survivor), fictional character

== See also ==
- William James Royce, writer
- Royce (disambiguation)
