= Ole Schack =

Danish motorsport mechanic

- Born: 17 June 1978 (age 48)
- Citizenship: Danish
- Employer: Red Bull Racing
- Title: Front End Mechanic

Ole Schack (born 17 June 1978) is a Danish motorsport mechanic. He was the front end mechanic to Max Verstappen at the Red Bull Racing Formula One team until November 2026.

== Career ==
Schack graduated as an auto mechanic in 1999. Schack began his motorsport career in 1999 in the Danish Formula 2000 series. In 2000, he moved to the Danish Formula Renault series and in 2001 he worked as a chief mechanic. In 2002–2003, Schack worked as a mechanic for the Danish team Den Blå Avis in the Formula 3000 series. For the 2004 season, he moved to F1 with the Jaguar Racing test team. In the 2005–2008 seasons, he worked for Red Bull Racing in the mechanics team for David Coulthard's car and in 2009–2014 for Sebastian Vettel.

At the 2012 Hungarian Grand Prix, his father died from cancer. Team principal Christian Horner wanted to do something special for his friend and mechanic, and decided that Schack would accept the trophy on behalf of Red Bull the next time the team won, which was in the 2012 Singapore Grand Prix a few months later.
