= Red Bull RB9 =

Formula One racing car

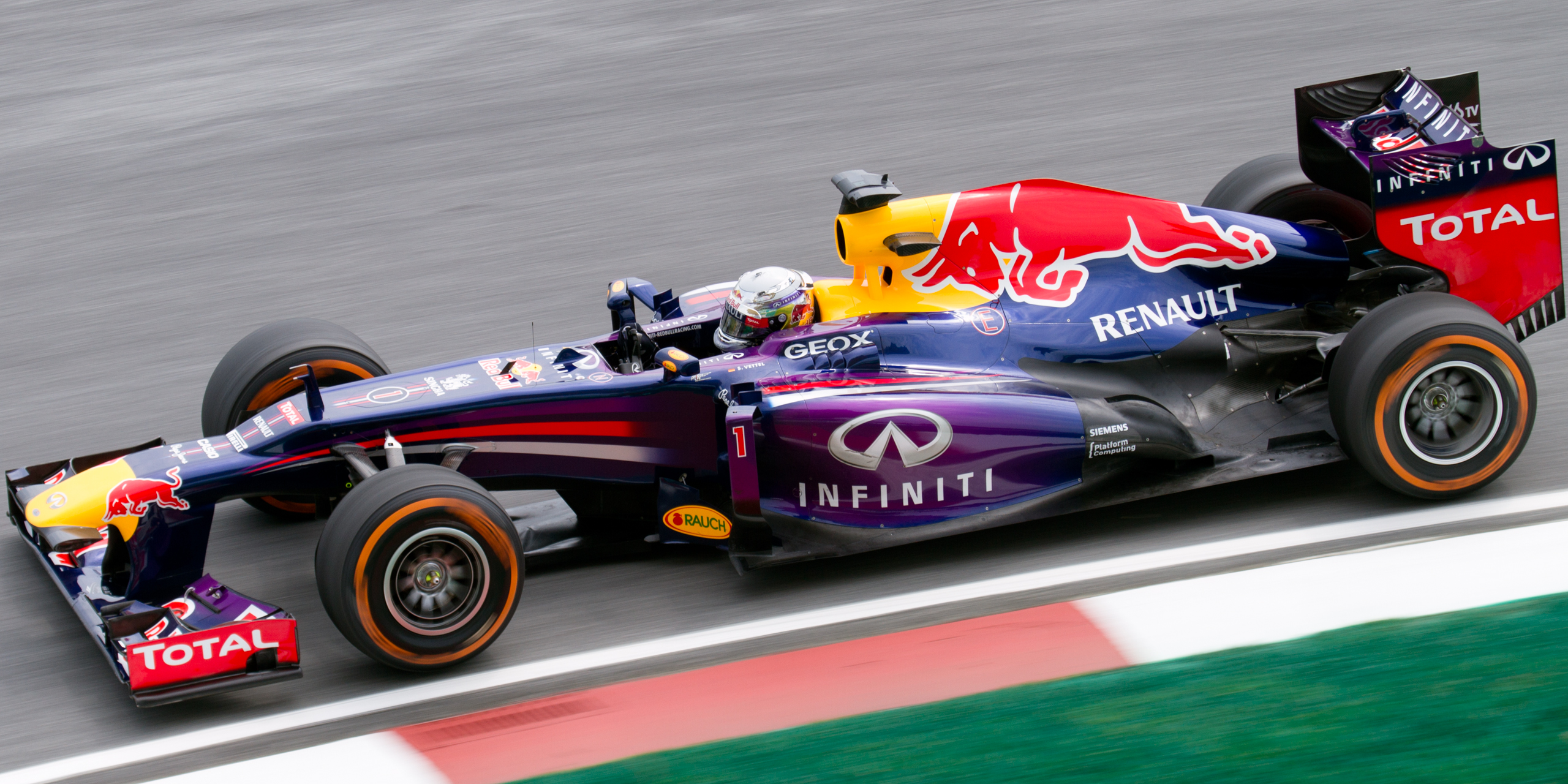
- The RB9 driven by Sebastian Vettel during the Malaysian Grand Prix
- Category: Formula One
- Constructor: Red Bull
- Designers: Adrian Newey (Chief Technical Officer); Rob Marshall (Chief Designer); Mark Ellis (Chief Engineer, Performance); Giles Wood (Chief Engineer, Simulation and Analysis); Steve Winstanley (Deputy Chief Designer, Composites and Structures); David Worner (Deputy Chief Designer, Mechanics and Suspension); Rob Gray (Head of R&D); Peter Prodromou (Chief Engineer, Aerodynamics); Dan Fallows (Chief Aerodynamicist)
- Predecessor: Red Bull RB8
- Successor: Red Bull RB10

Technical specifications
- Chassis: Carbon fibre Composite monocoque structure, designed and built in-house, carrying the Renault V8 engine as a fully-stressed member.
- Suspension (front): Aluminium alloy uprights, carbon-composite double wishbone with springs and anti-roll bar, multi-matic dampers
- Suspension (rear): Same as front
- Length: 5,080 mm (200 in)
- Width: 1,800 mm (71 in)
- Height: 950 mm (37 in)
- Wheelbase: 3,100 mm (122 in)
- Engine: Mecachrome-built Renault RS27-2013 2.4 L (146 cu in) V8 (90°). Naturally aspirated, 18,000 rpm limited with KERS, mid-mounted.
- Transmission: Red Bull Technology; Seven-speed, longitudinally mounted with hydraulic system for power shift and clutch operation. AP racing clutch. semi-automatic hydraulic paddle shift gearbox including reverse.
- Power: 750 hp (560 kW)
- Weight: 642 kg (1,415 lb) including driver and fuel
- Fuel: Total 94.25% 102 RON unleaded gasoline + 5.75% biofuel
- Lubricants: Total Quartz 7000
- Brakes: Brembo callipers. Carbon discs and pads
- Tyres: Pirelli P Zero radial dry slick and Pirelli Cinturato intermediate-wet treaded tyres O.Z. Racing forged magnesium alloy wheels.front: 12.0in x 13in diam., rear: 13.7in x 13in diam.

Competition history
- Notable entrants: Infiniti Red Bull Racing
- Notable drivers: 1. (Germany) Sebastian Vettel; 2. (Australia) Mark Webber
- Debut: 2013 Australian Grand Prix
- First win: 2013 Malaysian Grand Prix
- Last win: 2013 Brazilian Grand Prix
- Last event: 2013 Brazilian Grand Prix
Races	Wins	Podiums	Poles	F/Laps
19	13	24	11	12
- Constructors' Championships: 1 (2013)
- Drivers' Championships: 1 (2013, Sebastian Vettel)

The Red Bull RB9 is a Formula One racing car designed by Adrian Newey for Red Bull Racing to compete in the 2013 Formula One season. The car was driven by (then) three-time World Drivers' Champion Sebastian Vettel and teammate Mark Webber. Sebastian Vettel, in keeping with his tradition of naming his cars, named his RB9 "Hungry Heidi," after (Flavio Briatore's former partner) German model Heidi Klum. Vettel would ultimately claim the Drivers' Championship title, for the fourth consecutive season, at the Indian Grand Prix, after ten wins during the season. Vettel and Webber also brought the car to the last win and world titles for a V8 and a naturally-aspirated engine-powered F1 car, marking the end of the V8 and the naturally-aspirated engine-era of Formula One which began in 1989 when turbocharged engines were banned at that time.

As of 2026, the Red Bull RB9 was the most recent Renault-powered Formula One car to win either the Drivers' or Constructors' Championship.

== Competition history ==
In January 2013, Red Bull Chief Technical Officer Adrian Newey admitted that development of the RB9 chassis had been put on hold during the second half of the 2012 season so that the team could concentrate on developing its predecessor, the RB8, in order to secure the 2012 World Drivers' and Constructors' Championship titles.

The RB9 had a strong debut in Australia, with Vettel topping both Friday practice sessions, before taking pole position in qualifying, ahead of teammate Webber. Webber suffered a poor start due to a problem with KERS, while Vettel suffered with tyre degradation and finished the race in third place. Webber finished the race in sixth place.

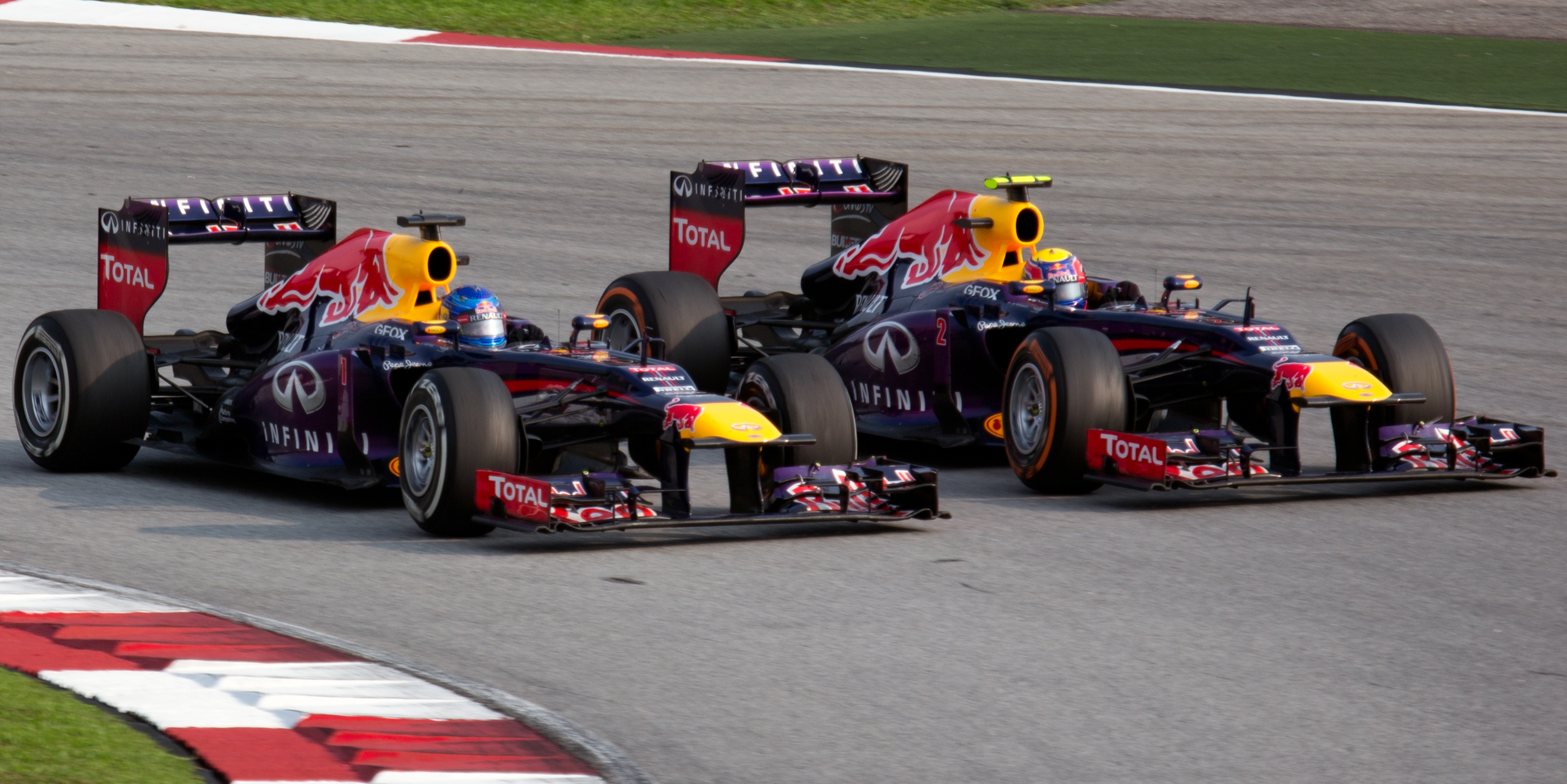
Sebastian Vettel overtook teammate Webber in the controversial Malaysian Grand Prix

In Malaysia, Vettel went on to win the race, following an order (which he ignored) to let his teammate Webber win the race. In China, Vettel did not set any time in the last session of qualifying, and Webber originally qualified 14th, but moved to the back of the grid for failing to provide a one-litre fuel sample after qualifying. In the race, Webber lost his rear right wheel on lap 15, meanwhile Vettel was almost close to get a podium finish to Lewis Hamilton, finishing 4th with a 0.203 second gap. In Bahrain, Vettel went on to win the race ahead of both Lotus drivers Kimi Räikkönen and Romain Grosjean.

The next race at Spain at Catalunya was disappointing for the team; neither driver got onto the podium. In Monaco, Vettel finished 2nd with a fastest lap set on the 77th lap, and Webber finished 3rd. In Canada, Vettel went on to win the race ahead of Fernando Alonso and Lewis Hamilton, meanwhile Webber finished 4th. At the British Grand Prix, Vettel and Webber qualified 3rd and 4th respectively, but on lap 41 of the race, Vettel suffered from a gearbox problem coming to the final turn of the circuit, costing him a victory. The safety car would be deployed, and the race was won by Nico Rosberg. His teammate Webber would finish 2nd. Vettel went on to win at his home race in Germany at Nürburgring. In Hungary Vettel and Webber finished 3rd and 4th respectively.

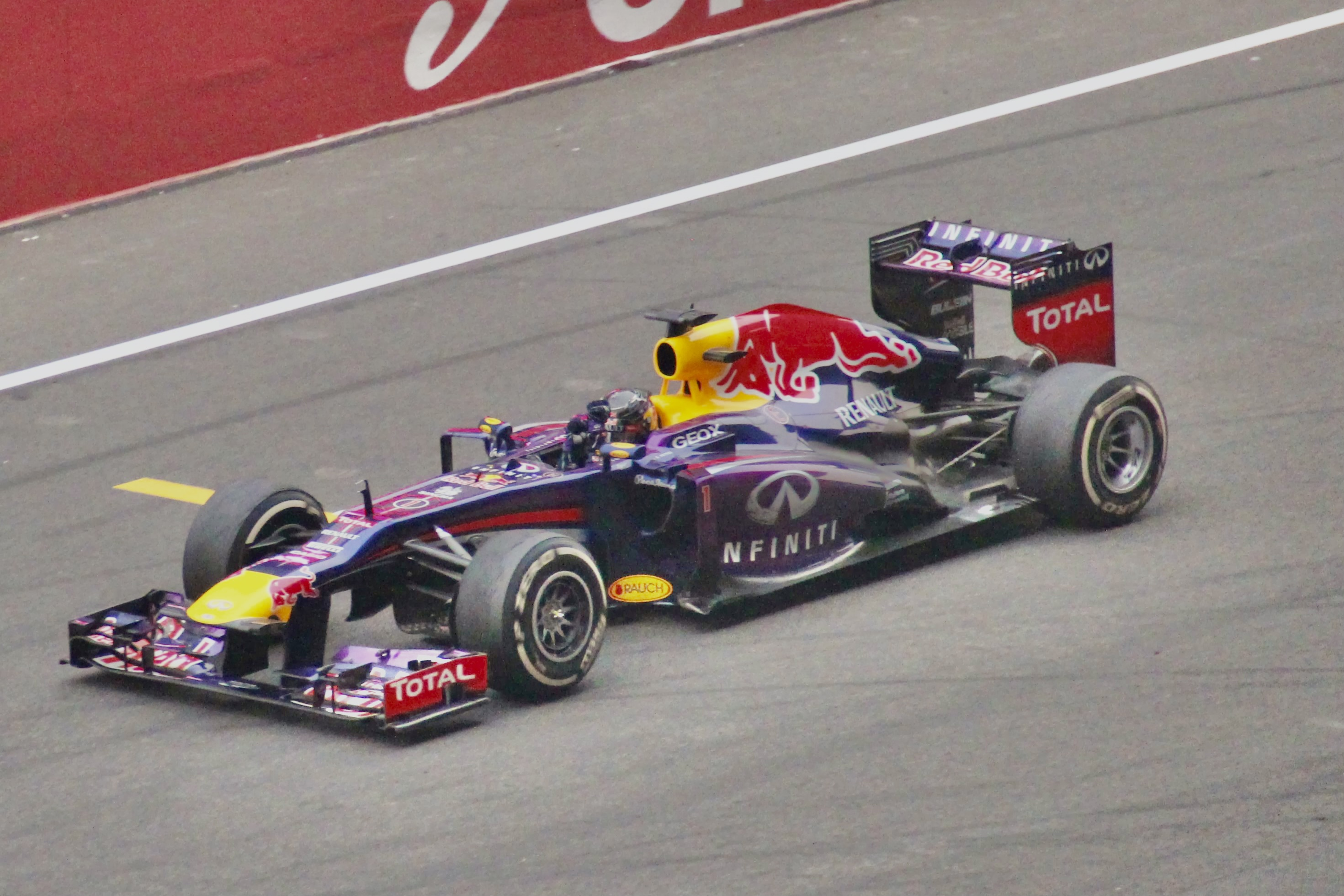
Vettel went on a nine-consecutive race win after the summer break. Pictured here is during the Indian Grand Prix where he clinched his fourth World Drivers' Championship title

From Belgium to the season-ending race at Brazil, Vettel broke the record for most consecutive wins in a season by a total of 9. Sebastian Vettel would eventually clinch his fourth and final World Drivers' Championship title at the Indian Grand Prix.

Mark Webber announced his Formula One retirement at the British Grand Prix, and the seat went to fellow Australian Daniel Ricciardo which was confirmed in September.

== Sponsorship and livery ==
The basic colors of the RB9 are dark blue and purple. In addition to sponsor stickers from Infiniti, there are large Red Bull stickers on the side pods, the Red Bull logo on the hood and nose, and the Red Bull lettering on the front and rear wings. Other sponsors on the vehicle are Rauch, Pepe Jeans, Casio and Geox.

At the Korean Grand Prix, the CU logo could be seen on the bargeboard of the cars.

== Electric version ==
On August 20, 2014, on the sidelines of the 2014 Belgian Grand Prix, Red Bull presented a fully electric version of the RB9, fitted with the nose of the Red Bull RB10, intended to facilitate pit stop training for mechanics; indeed, this electric single-seater can easily move forwards and backwards, which makes it possible to increase the frequency of operations devolved to mechanics.

== Other events ==
At the start of the 2014 F1 season, Daniel Ricciardo raced an RB9 against a Royal Australian Air Force (RAAF) F/A-18 Hornet, piloted by RAAF pilot Michael Keightley.

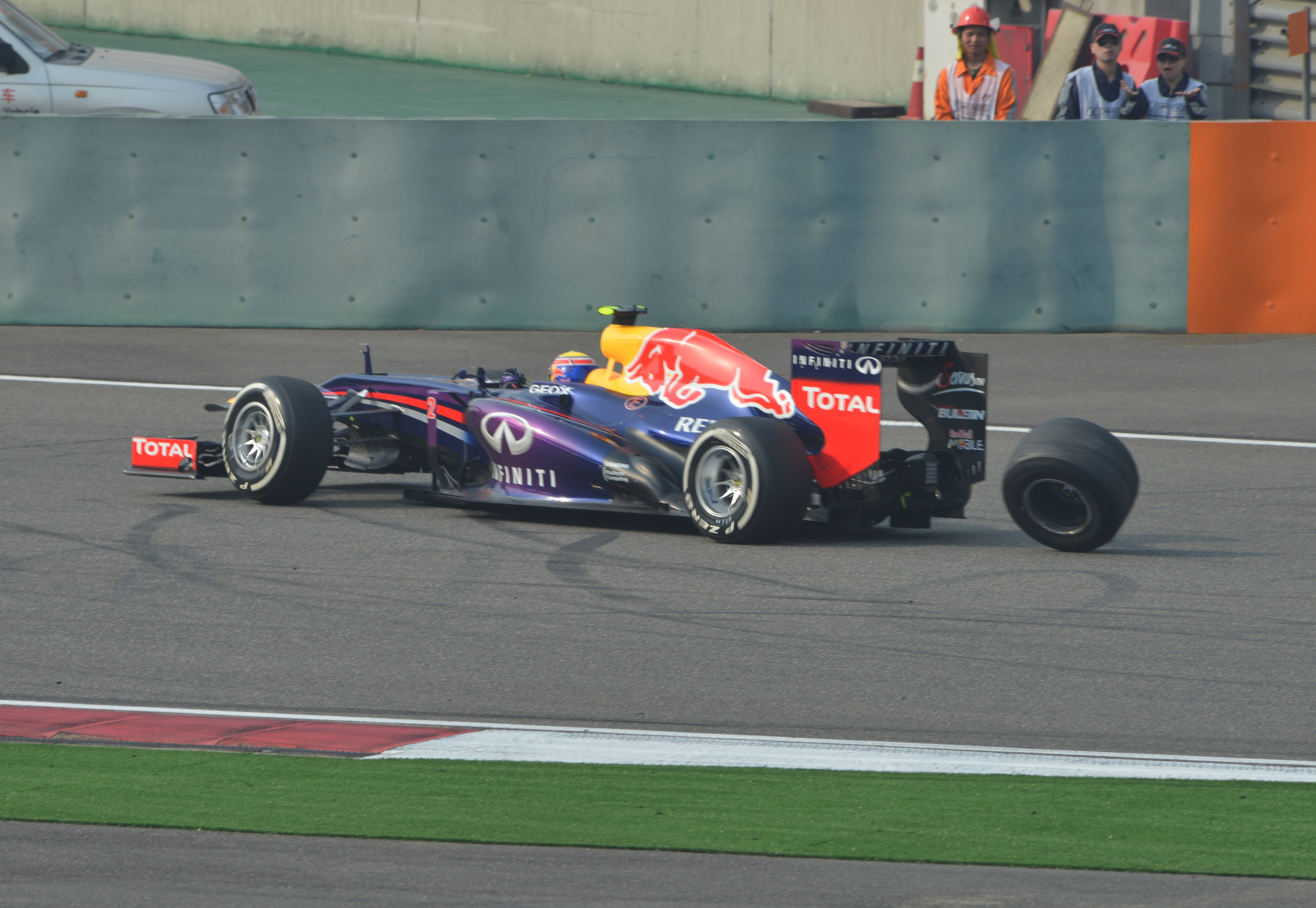
Mark Webber losing his wheel at the 2013 Chinese Grand Prix

== Complete Formula One results ==
(key) (results in bold indicate pole position; results in italics indicate fastest lap)

Year	Entrant	Engine	Tyres	Drivers	Grands Prix																			Points	WCC
Year	Entrant	Engine	Tyres	Drivers	AUS	MAL	CHN	BHR	ESP	MON	CAN	GBR	GER	HUN	BEL	ITA	SIN	KOR	JPN	IND	ABU	USA	BRA	Points	WCC
2013	Infiniti Red Bull Racing	Renault RS27-2013	**P**	(Germany) Sebastian Vettel	**3**	**1**	4	1	4	2	**1**	Ret	1	3	1	**1**	**1**	**1**	1	**1**	1	**1**	**1**	**596**	**1st**
2013	Infiniti Red Bull Racing	Renault RS27-2013	**P**	(Australia) Mark Webber	6	2	Ret	7	5	3	4	2	7	4	5	3	15^{†}	Ret	**2**	Ret	**2**	3	2	**596**	**1st**

^{†} Driver failed to finish the race, but was classified as they had completed greater than 90% of the race distance.

Awards
Preceded by Red Bull RB8	Autosport; Racing Car Of The Year; 2013	Succeeded by Mercedes F1 W05 Hybrid
