= 2012 Canadian Grand Prix =

2012 Formula One race held in Montreal, Canada

Race 7 of 20 in the 2012 Formula One World Championship
← Previous race	Next race →
- Circuit Gilles Villeneuve

Race details
- Date: 10 June 2012
- Official name: Formula 1 Grand Prix du Canada 2012
- Location: Circuit Gilles Villeneuve, Montreal, Quebec, Canada
- Course: Street circuit
- Course length: 4.361 km (2.710 miles)
- Distance: 70 laps, 305.270 km (189.686 miles)
- Weather: Fine, dry and warm; with air temperature approaching 29 °C (84 °F) Track Temp 45 °C (113 °F) dropping to 39 °C (102 °F)

Pole position
Driver	(Germany) Sebastian Vettel	Red Bull-Renault
- Time: 1:13.784

Fastest lap
Driver	(Germany) Sebastian Vettel	Red Bull-Renault
- Time: 1:15.752 on lap 70

Podium
First	(United Kingdom) Lewis Hamilton	McLaren-Mercedes
Second	(France) Romain Grosjean	Lotus-Renault
Third	(Mexico) Sergio Pérez	Sauber-Ferrari

The 2012 Canadian Grand Prix (formally the Formula 1 Grand Prix du Canada 2012) was a Formula One motor race that took place on 10 June 2012 at the Circuit Gilles Villeneuve in Montreal, Quebec, Canada. The 70-lap race was the seventh round of the 2012 Formula One season, and the first of two North American rounds. It was the 49th Canadian Grand Prix, and the 33rd to be held at the circuit since its début on the calendar in 1978. Sebastian Vettel started the race from pole.

Lewis Hamilton went on to win his first race of the year, becoming the seventh different driver to win in as many races, a record for a single Formula One season. The podium was completed by Lotus' Romain Grosjean and Sergio Pérez of Sauber, with both drivers scoring their second overall podium each thus far.

== Report ==
=== Background ===
After experimenting with two Drag Reduction System (DRS) zones with a single activation point in 2011, the FIA decided that the 2012 race would use a single, shorter DRS zone. In 2011, the DRS zone was 650 metres from the l'Epingle hairpin to the final chicane, with a secondary zone placed along the main straight. For 2012, the detection point was once again placed after the l'Epingle hairpin, and the DRS zone was shortened to 600 metres, while the secondary zone along the pit straight was removed. The FIA explained that the DRS zone was shortened because overtaking was "too easy" in 2011.

The Monaco Grand Prix saw several teams question the legality of parts used by Red Bull Racing on their car, and although Mark Webber's win went uncontested, rival teams sought clarification on matter. One week before the Canadian Grand Prix, the FIA declared the parts used in Monaco to be illegal, forcing the team to change them. The team was also forced to change the design of their axles, after FIA Race Director Charlie Whiting felt that holes in the axles contravened the technical regulations.

Like the 2011 Canadian Grand Prix, tyre supplier Pirelli brought its yellow-banded soft compound tyre as the harder "prime" tyre and the red-banded supersoft compound tyre as the softer "option" tyre.

==== Threats from student protest groups ====
Following a smoke bomb incident on Montreal Metro subway, student activists from the Université du Québec à Montréal threatened to prevent the race from going ahead as part of ongoing demonstrations across Quebec. Further threats emerged two weeks later, with activists calling for disruptions to the race, which they depicted as a symbol of the "capitalist class", while students from the Faculty of Arts at the Université du Québec à Montréal described the Grand Prix as "[representing] sexist, anti-environmental, elitist and economic values that must be abolished" and suggested disruptions be organized by the Coalition Large de l'Association pour une Solidarité Syndicale Étudiante (CLASSE) — recognised as the most-radical student protest group. The race was specifically mentioned in chants directed at Premier of Quebec Jean Charest.

After attacking the Formula One website in protest against the Bahrain Grand Prix, hacktivist community Anonymous threatened similar action against the sport to protest the Canadian Grand Prix as a part of "Operation Quebec", promising to block access to the circuit, light fires within the circuit limits, and foreshadowing attacks on hotels in the city proper. Anti-capitalist group CLAC also threatened to target Crescent Street in downtown Montreal to "disrupt this crass elite at play", describing the Grand Prix as "an orgy of cash [that] symbolizes turbo-capitalism."

In response to these threats, organisers for the event cancelled the "Open Doors Day" scheduled for the Thursday before the race. Three hundred protesters gathered at an official pre-race function on the same day, with riot police called in to disperse the crowd. Montreal police also carried out raids on eighteen homes in the city, arresting eleven people suspected of widespread vandalism. Thirty-seven people were arrested on Friday evening when they staged a nude protest in front of tourists. A third protest took place on Saturday afternoon, though no arrests were made.

Montreal resident and former World Champion Jacques Villeneuve was highly critical of the protesters, comparing them to rioters who took part in the 2011 England riots and describing them as "people [who] grew up without ever hearing their parents ever tell them 'no'." After claiming that plans by activists to block the Montreal Metro system on the day of the race could be considered an act of terrorism, Villeneuve claimed he had received "insulting" and "dangerous" e-mails.

=== Free practice ===
Lewis Hamilton was the fastest driver in the first practice session, a tenth of a second faster than Sebastian Vettel and two-tenths faster than Nico Rosberg. Jenson Button was forced out of the session early after his team discovered an oil leak in his car, but still finished the session tenth, while Caterham driver Heikki Kovalainen crashed at Turn 9 halfway through the session, bringing out the red flag. Sebastian Vettel was summoned by the stewards after he was observed cutting across the final chicane to avoid Bruno Senna and guarantee a clear circuit for a flying run, but no action was taken. A HRT mechanic was taken to hospital after he was hit by Pedro de la Rosa in pit lane, but the team reported that he had not suffered any serious injuries.

Hamilton continued his form in the second session, this time leading the Ferraris of Fernando Alonso and Felipe Massa. Jenson Button emerged late in the session, the team having overcome his oil leak, to set the ninth-fastest time; likewise, Caterham managed to rebuild Kovalainen's car in time for him to take part in the session. As in the first session, the second was interrupted by a red flag when Bruno Senna crashed at the final chicane, destroying one of the experimental rear wings Williams had brought to the race.

Jean-Éric Vergne became the third driver to crash in free practice, when he went off at the first turn on Saturday morning during his first flying lap, whilst Nico Rosberg suffered from a fuel pick-up problem that cost him an entire hour of running. Vettel finished the session fastest, just six thousandths of a second faster than Fernando Alonso, with Hamilton third. Kimi Räikkönen was investigated by the stewards for a dangerous pit entry, and was later fined for the incident.

=== Qualifying ===
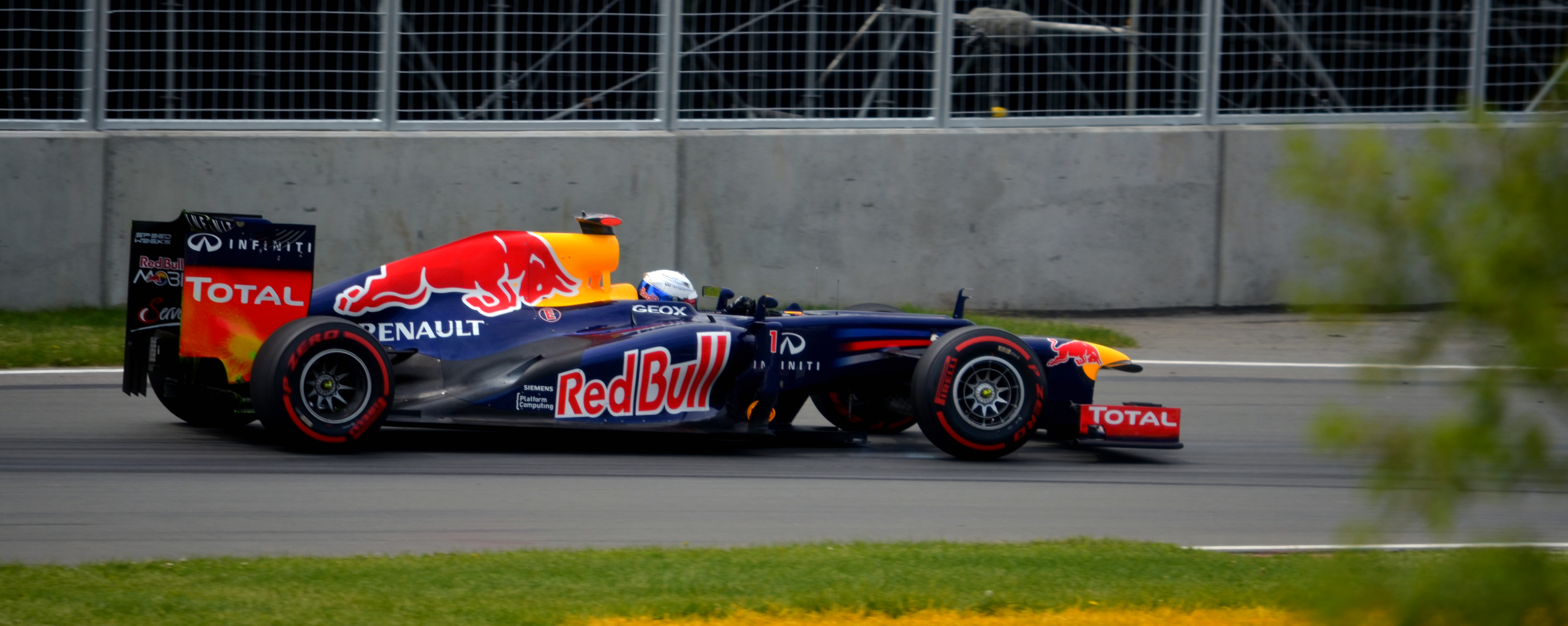
Sebastian Vettel qualified on pole position.

Jean-Éric Vergne was eliminated in Q1, out-qualified by the Caterhams of Heikki Kovalainen and Vitaly Petrov. Petrov was faster than his teammate for most of the Q1 session, but a late lap from Kovalainen – which included a bumpy ride across the kerbs at the final chicane – put him two-tenths of a second clear of the Russian. Pedro de la Rosa outqualified both Marussia cars by half a second, with teammate Narain Karthikeyan within a tenth of a second of Charles Pic, completing the final row of the grid. Sebastian Vettel was the fastest driver in the session.

The second qualifying period was closely fought, with many drivers vying for a place in Q3 by only a few hundredths of a second, and the exact running order was only resolved in the final few seconds when Pastor Maldonado spun at the final chicane and glanced against the outer wall. Maldonado pushed too hard into the chicane. He managed to keep his car from ploughing into the outer wall, but damaged his right rear wheel and suspension and ultimately finished seventeenth. Romain Grosjean narrowly avoided elimination, but his teammate Kimi Räikkönen finished twelfth, behind Kamui Kobayashi. Despite setting the early pace, Nico Hülkenberg qualified thirteenth, with Daniel Ricciardo alongside him in fourteenth, a full second quicker than teammate Vergne. Sergio Pérez was fifteenth, admitting to having locked up his front tyres at the hairpin on his final flying lap. Bruno Senna qualified sixteenth overall, narrowly ahead of Maldonado.

All ten cars took to the circuit for Q3. Vettel qualified on pole, ahead of Lewis Hamilton and Fernando Alonso. Mark Webber was fourth, ahead of Nico Rosberg who finished fifth. Felipe Massa was sixth in his second appearance in Q3 in as many races, ahead of Grosjean in seventh and Paul di Resta eighth. After bettering Nico Rosberg's times in Q1 and Q2, Michael Schumacher finished ninth, half a second behind Rosberg. Onboard footage showed Schumacher visibly frustrated with a slower car on his final flying lap, though no action was taken. Jenson Button completed the grid in tenth, having elected to use the soft tyres as opposed to the super-softs used by everyone else.

Following his contact with the wall at the end of his seventeenth placed qualifying performance, the Williams team decided to change Pastor Maldonado's gearbox prior to the race. As a result, Maldonado incurred an automatic five place grid penalty and was demoted to twenty-second position for the start.

=== Race ===
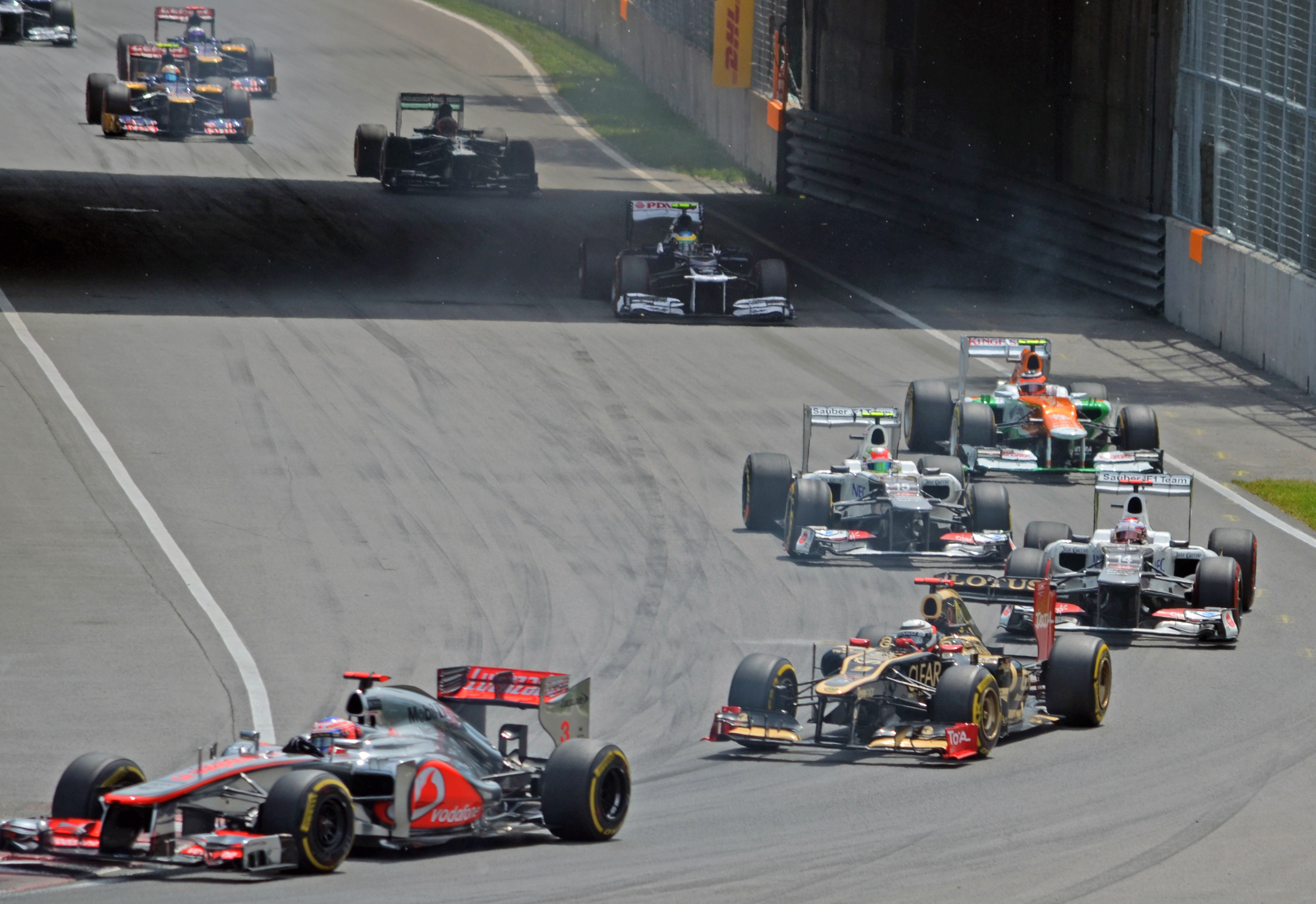
Jenson Button leading a train of cars in the opening stages of the race - he eventually finished sixteenth.

As required by the qualifying regulations, the top 9 qualifiers all started on the faster red-banded super soft tyres, with 10th placed Jenson Button who did not set a time in Q3 choosing to start on the yellow-banded softs. The remaining drivers had a choice of tyres; Kimi Räikkönen, Nico Hülkenberg, Sergio Pérez, Pastor Maldonado and Pedro de la Rosa opted for the softs, the remainder for the super softs.

The race got off to a clean start, with Sebastian Vettel taking the early lead from pole. There were no big changes behind him, as Lewis Hamilton, Fernando Alonso, Mark Webber, Nico Rosberg and Felipe Massa all staying in their respective places. Pastor Maldonado made up a few places after starting 22nd. Massa passed Rosberg for fifth soon after, with the latter soon losing another spot to Paul di Resta. Di Resta was unable to keep the pace of the top 5, and a gap formed up between the first 5 and the rest of the pack.

Massa had started closing in on Webber after passing Rosberg, but he then spun and dropped down to 12th, at the tail of the second group led by di Resta. At the head of the field, Vettel built a two-second lead in the first four laps over Hamilton, but then Hamilton slowly started reeling him back in as the super softs slowly began to wear out. Before the first round of pit stops, Hamilton closed right up to Vettel and started to get held up, with Fernando Alonso taking the opportunity to join the leading two. The stops started as early as lap 13 for Massa, and on lap 14 for di Resta and Michael Schumacher. Vettel stayed until lap 16 before pitting, handing the lead to Hamilton who came in on the next lap and rejoined ahead of Vettel, despite a slow pitstop.

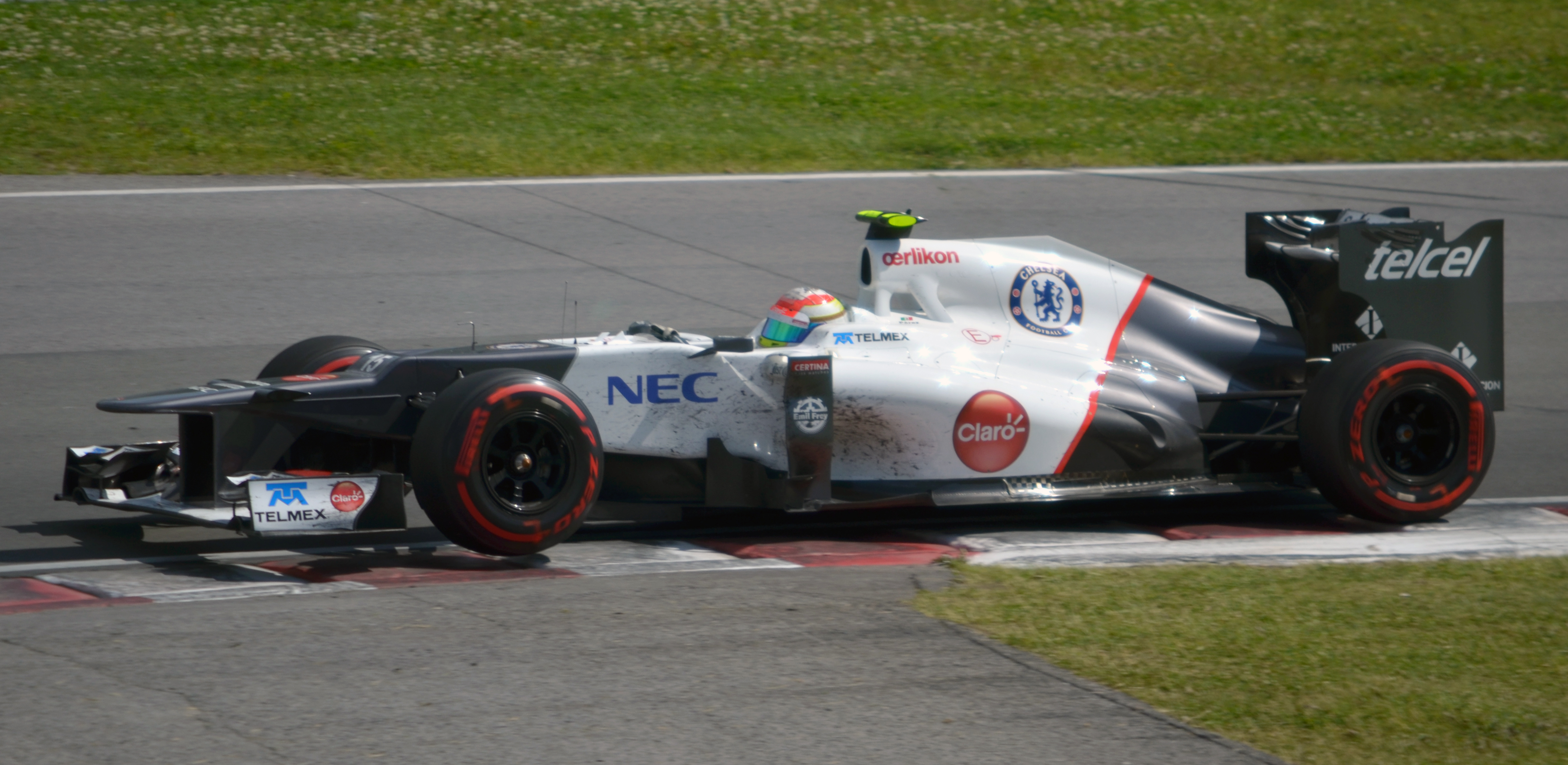
After starting in fifteenth place, Sergio Pérez conserved his tyres to finish in third place and take the second podium finish of his career.

Alonso stayed out two laps longer than Hamilton and, helped by a quick pitstop was able to rejoin in second place, ahead of Hamilton and Vettel and only behind temporary leader Romain Grosjean who was yet to pit. Hamilton immediately attacked him in the DRS zone on the same lap and succeeded to take 2nd place, which became the lead two laps later when Grosjean pitted. Webber was unable to keep up with the leading trio in the first stint and thus, after his stop rejoined behind the yet to stop Sergio Pérez and Kimi Räikkönen, and got held up behind the duo. This left the leading trio of Hamilton, Alonso and Vettel with a gap around 15 seconds to the rest of the field, with the McLaren driver being able to edge out a lead over his two pursuers.

On lap 24 Narain Karthikeyan was the first retirement after spinning on turn 1 and pulling over shortly afterwards. Shortly afterwards, his HRT teammate Pedro de la Rosa stopped in the pits with worn-out brakes and didn't re-emerge.

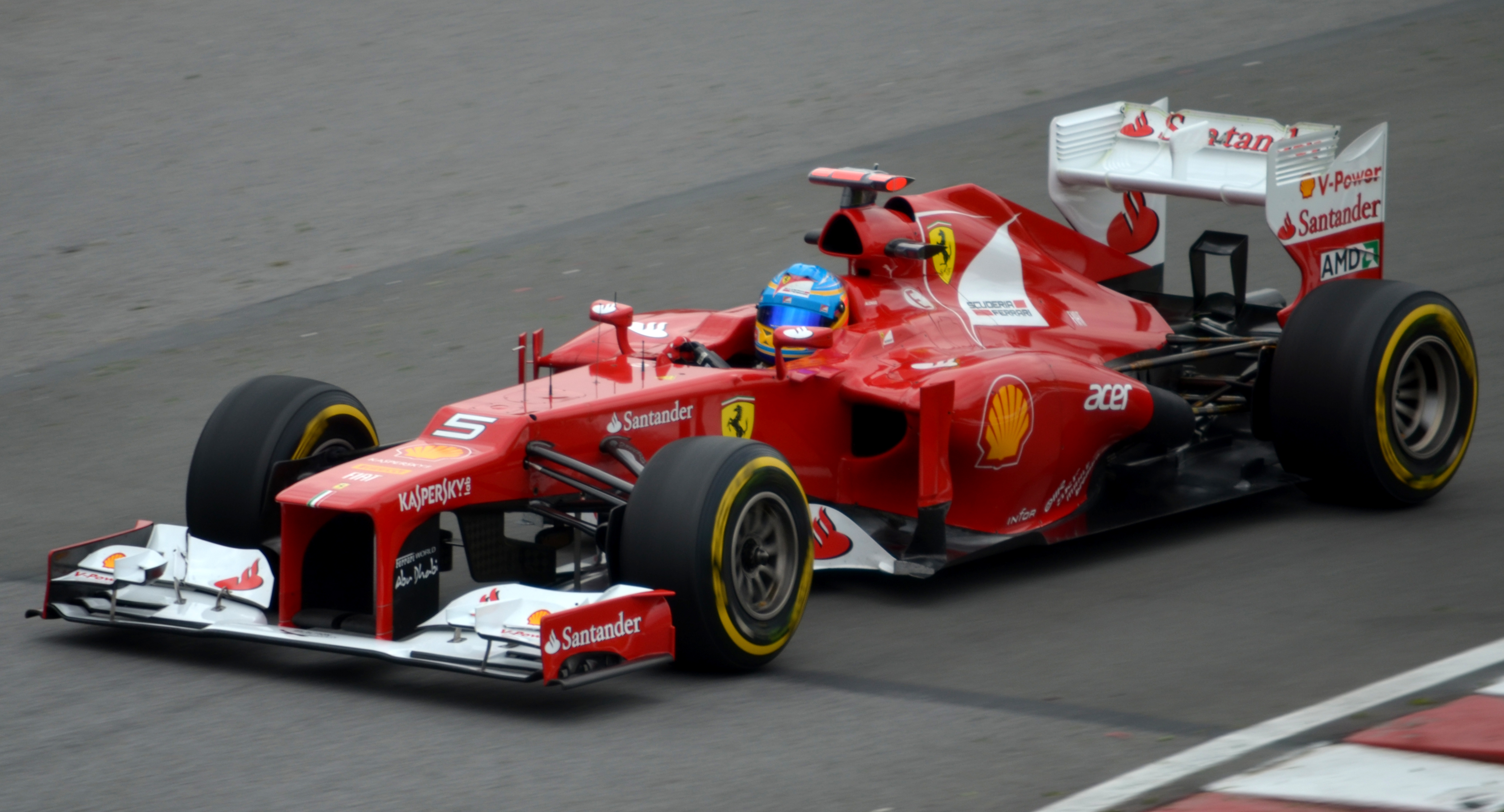
Fernando Alonso led for 17 laps of the race, but his tyres degraded near the end and he quickly lost four places, slipping to fifth.

Räikkönen and Pérez, running 4th and 5th having started on the soft tyres both had a long first stint as they tried to make the race on a single stop. With Webber being held up behind the duo, this allowed both Grosjean and Nico Rosberg to close up on him. Rosberg made his second stop on lap 40, one lap before Räikkönen made his only stop. Räikkönen rejoined in front of Rosberg, but Rosberg was able to pass him in the DRS zone on the same lap, just as Hamilton did on Alonso earlier. Pérez made his stop on lap 42 and rejoined in between the duo, in 8th place. Michael Schumacher's run of bad luck continued when he left the pits on lap 43 with his DRS flap open was running 9th. He returned to the pits but the team were unable to close the flap, forcing his retirement.

Hamilton was able to open up a 4-second lead over Alonso, with Vettel being initially held up by the Spaniard, but unable to keep up with him as the Ferrari driver found the grip in his tyres. As the stint wore on, Alonso was able to pull clear of Vettel and close down Hamilton's lead to just over 2 seconds, and Hamilton decided to make a second stop for new tyres. He rejoined in third, 9.5 seconds behind Vettel and 13 behind Alonso, and just ahead of Webber and Grosjean who were fighting for 4th. Both Alonso and Vettel realized that they do not have enough of a gap to make another stop and rejoin ahead of Hamilton, so they stayed out and attempted to complete the race without stopping again in an attempt to win.

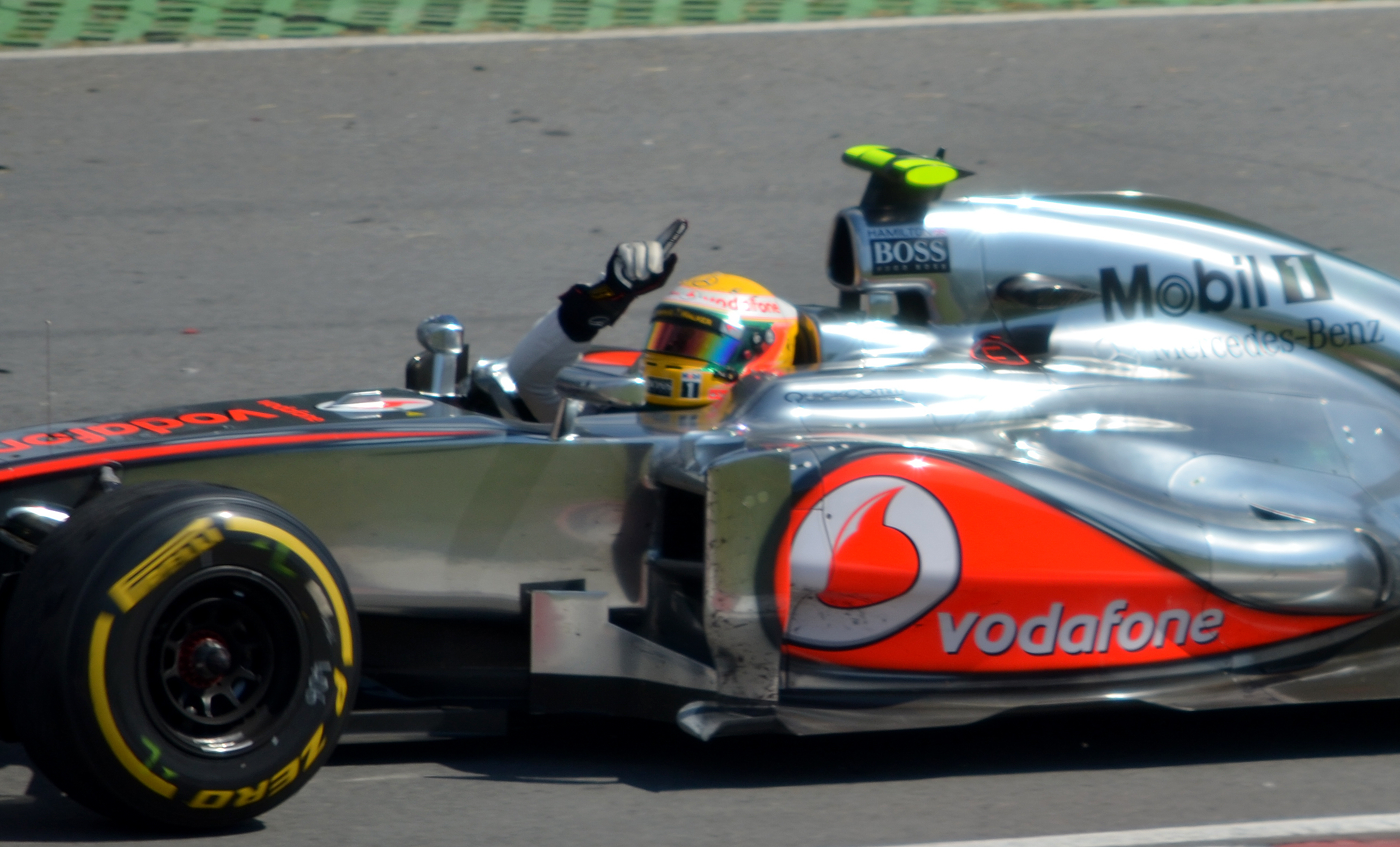
Lewis Hamilton took the race victory to become the seventh different winner from the opening seven rounds of the 2012 season.

The battles continued to rage behind the leading trio, as Grosjean started to attack 4th placed Webber. The Red Bull driver decided to make a second pitstop for new tyres and rejoined in 8th place, behind Rosberg and Pérez, but ahead of Räikkönen. Felipe Massa, who was unable to regain the places he lost due to his spin, was now back up to 5th place as he too attempted a one-stopper. That did not work out however, and Rosberg had closed right up to him by lap 55, and brought Pérez, Webber and Räikkönen along. Rosberg attacked Massa on the DRS zone, but overshot the last chicane and had to give the position back. Pérez took advantage of this and was right behind Massa, which meant that he too was able to get the jump on Rosberg when he handed the place back to Massa. He then passed Massa on the same lap, with Rosberg also going through, this time doing the job cleanly. The Brazilian had enough, and pitted for a new set of tyres and rejoined in 10th place, where he stayed till the end.

Hamilton on his newer tyres was rapidly gaining on Alonso and Vettel at the front at over a second a lap. As the race entered the latter stages, the tyres of Alonso and Vettel began to totally wear out, and their lap times now dropped by 3 seconds a lap. Hamilton passed Vettel on lap 62, and Alonso two laps later to take the lead, but the tyres of the latter two were so worn that they were vulnerable to the rest of the field. Vettel decided to stop for new tyres on lap 64 and rejoined fifth behind Grosjean and Pérez, who had broken away from the battle between Rosberg, Webber and Räikkönen. Alonso decided to stay out on his totally worn tyres and was passed by Grosjean on lap 66, Pérez one lap later, and a charging Vettel on the penultimate lap. Lewis Hamilton had no trouble reeling off the last 6 laps once he had taken the lead and became the 7th different winner in 7 races. Grosjean and Sergio Pérez achieved their 2nd career podium finishes as they finished second and third respectively. Vettel recovered to 4th, only 2 seconds behind Pérez at the flag. A frustrated Alonso dropped to 5th ahead of Rosberg who had an up and down race finishing 6th, fending off Webber and Räikkönen. Kamui Kobayashi finished a respectable 9th place in the other Sauber with Massa getting the final point in 10th.

== Classification ==
=== Qualifying ===
Pos.	No.	Driver	Constructor	Part 1	Part 2	Part 3	Grid
1	1	(Germany) Sebastian Vettel	Red Bull-Renault	1:14.661	1:14.187	1:13.784	1
2	4	(United Kingdom) Lewis Hamilton	McLaren-Mercedes	1:14.891	1:14.371	1:14.087	2
3	5	(Spain) Fernando Alonso	Ferrari	1:14.916	1:14.314	1:14.151	3
4	2	(Australia) Mark Webber	Red Bull-Renault	1:14.956	1:14.479	1:14.346	4
5	8	(Germany) Nico Rosberg	Mercedes	1:15.098	1:14.568	1:14.411	5
6	6	(Brazil) Felipe Massa	Ferrari	1:15.194	1:14.641	1:14.465	6
7	10	(France) Romain Grosjean	Lotus-Renault	1:15.163	1:14.627	1:14.645	7
8	11	(United Kingdom) Paul di Resta	Force India-Mercedes	1:15.019	1:14.639	1:14.705	8
9	7	(Germany) Michael Schumacher	Mercedes	1:14.892	1:14.480	1:14.812	9
10	3	(United Kingdom) Jenson Button	McLaren-Mercedes	1:14.799	1:14.680	1:15.182	10
11	14	(Japan) Kamui Kobayashi	Sauber-Ferrari	1:15.101	1:14.688		11
12	9	(Finland) Kimi Räikkönen	Lotus-Renault	1:14.995	1:14.734		12
13	12	(Germany) Nico Hülkenberg	Force India-Mercedes	1:15.107	1:14.748		13
14	16	(Australia) Daniel Ricciardo	Toro Rosso-Ferrari	1:15.552	1:15.078		14
15	15	(Mexico) Sergio Pérez	Sauber-Ferrari	1:15.326	1:15.156		15
16	19	(Brazil) Bruno Senna	Williams-Renault	1:14.995	1:15.170		16
17	18	(Venezuela) Pastor Maldonado	Williams-Renault	1:14.979	1:15.231		22^{1}
18	20	(Finland) Heikki Kovalainen	Caterham-Renault	1:16.263			17
19	21	(Russia) Vitaly Petrov	Caterham-Renault	1:16.482			18
20	17	(France) Jean-Éric Vergne	Toro Rosso-Ferrari	1:16.602			19
21	22	(Spain) Pedro de la Rosa	HRT-Cosworth	1:17.492			20
22	24	(Germany) Timo Glock	Marussia-Cosworth	1:17.901			21
23	25	(France) Charles Pic	Marussia-Cosworth	1:18.255			23
24	23	(India) Narain Karthikeyan	HRT-Cosworth	1:18.330			24
107% time: 1:19.887

Notes
^1 — Pastor Maldonado qualified seventeenth, but dropped five grid places as penalty for an unscheduled gearbox change.

=== Race ===
Pos	No	Driver	Constructor	Laps	Time/Retired	Grid	Points
1	4	(United Kingdom) Lewis Hamilton	McLaren-Mercedes	70	1:32:29.586	2	25
2	10	(France) Romain Grosjean	Lotus-Renault	70	+2.513	7	18
3	15	(Mexico) Sergio Pérez	Sauber-Ferrari	70	+5.260	15	15
4	1	(Germany) Sebastian Vettel	Red Bull-Renault	70	+7.295	1	12
5	5	(Spain) Fernando Alonso	Ferrari	70	+13.411	3	10
6	8	(Germany) Nico Rosberg	Mercedes	70	+13.842	5	8
7	2	(Australia) Mark Webber	Red Bull-Renault	70	+15.085	4	6
8	9	(Finland) Kimi Räikkönen	Lotus-Renault	70	+15.567	12	4
9	14	(Japan) Kamui Kobayashi	Sauber-Ferrari	70	+24.432	11	2
10	6	(Brazil) Felipe Massa	Ferrari	70	+25.272	6	1
11	11	(United Kingdom) Paul di Resta	Force India-Mercedes	70	+37.693	8	
12	12	(Germany) Nico Hülkenberg	Force India-Mercedes	70	+46.236	13	
13	18	(Venezuela) Pastor Maldonado	Williams-Renault	70	+47.052	22	
14	16	(Australia) Daniel Ricciardo	Toro Rosso-Ferrari	70	+1:04.475	14	
15	17	(France) Jean-Éric Vergne	Toro Rosso-Ferrari	69	+1 Lap	19	
16	3	(United Kingdom) Jenson Button	McLaren-Mercedes	69	+1 Lap	10	
17	19	(Brazil) Bruno Senna	Williams-Renault	69	+1 Lap	16	
18	20	(Finland) Heikki Kovalainen	Caterham-Renault	69	+1 Lap	17	
19	21	(Russia) Vitaly Petrov	Caterham-Renault	69	+1 Lap	18	
20	25	(France) Charles Pic	Marussia-Cosworth	67	+3 Laps	23	
Ret	24	(Germany) Timo Glock	Marussia-Cosworth	56	Brakes	21	
Ret	7	(Germany) Michael Schumacher	Mercedes	43	Hydraulics	9	
Ret	22	(Spain) Pedro de la Rosa	HRT-Cosworth	24	Brakes	20	
Ret	23	(India) Narain Karthikeyan	HRT-Cosworth	22	Brakes	24	

== Championship standings after the race ==
Hamilton's victory elevated him to the lead in the World Drivers' Championship with 88 points, leapfrogging previous leader Alonso and both Red Bull drivers Vettel and Webber. Hamilton led the championship by two and three points from Alonso and Vettel, respectively, with Webber nine points behind Hamilton in fourth. Meanwhile, McLaren reduced their points deficit over Red Bull to 31 points, with Lotus reclaiming third spot from Ferrari, distancing the latter by eleven points.

Drivers' Championship standings

	Pos.	Driver	Points
3	1	(United Kingdom) Lewis Hamilton	88
1	2	(Spain) Fernando Alonso	86
1	3	(Germany) Sebastian Vettel	85
1	4	(Australia) Mark Webber	79
	5	(Germany) Nico Rosberg	67

Constructors' Championship standings

	Pos.	Constructor	Points
	1	(Austria) Red Bull-Renault	164
	2	(United Kingdom) McLaren-Mercedes	133
1	3	(United Kingdom) Lotus-Renault	108
1	4	(Italy) Ferrari	97
	5	(Germany) Mercedes	69

- Note: Only the top five positions are included for both sets of standings.

Previous race: 2012 Monaco Grand Prix	FIA Formula One World Championship; 2012 season	Next race: 2012 European Grand Prix
Previous race: 2011 Canadian Grand Prix	Canadian Grand Prix	Next race: 2013 Canadian Grand Prix
