= 2012 Hungarian Grand Prix =

Formula One motor race held in 2012

Race 11 of 20 in the 2012 Formula One World Championship
| ← Previous race | Next race → |
- The Hungaroring circuit

Race details
- Date: 29 July 2012
- Official name: Formula 1 Eni Magyar Nagydíj 2012
- Location: Hungaroring, Mogyoród, Hungary
- Course: Permanent racing facility
- Course length: 4.381 km (2.722 miles)
- Distance: 69 laps, 302.249 km (187.809 miles)
- Scheduled distance: 70 laps, 306.630 km (190.531 miles)
- Weather: Fine and Dry. Very Hot Air Temp 30 °C (86 °F) Track Temp 45 °C (113 °F)

Pole position
| Driver | (United Kingdom) Lewis Hamilton | McLaren-Mercedes |
- Time: 1:20.953

Fastest lap
| Driver | (Germany) Sebastian Vettel | Red Bull-Renault |
- Time: 1:24.136 on lap 68

Podium
| First | (United Kingdom) Lewis Hamilton | McLaren-Mercedes |
| Second | (Finland) Kimi Räikkönen | Lotus-Renault |
| Third | (France) Romain Grosjean | Lotus-Renault |

The 2012 Hungarian Grand Prix (formally the Formula 1 Eni Magyar Nagydíj 2012) was a Formula One motor race that took place at the Hungaroring circuit near Mogyoród, Hungary on 29 July 2012. It was the eleventh round of the 2012 season, and the 27th running of the Hungarian Grand Prix as a round of the World Championship. The race was held 2 days after the opening ceremony of the 2012 Summer Olympic Games in London.

Lewis Hamilton started the sixty nine lap race from pole position—his first since the 2012 Malaysian Grand Prix—alongside Romain Grosjean, in his career-best starting position. Hamilton went on to win the race with Kimi Räikkönen second and Grosjean finishing third.

== Report ==
=== Background ===
Regulation changes

Red Bull Racing were referred to race stewards at the German Grand Prix after FIA Technical Delegate Jo Bauer noted that their engine maps had the potential to violate the technical regulations. Red Bull stood accused of manipulating the relationship between the torque produced by the Red Bull RB8 and the degree to which the throttle was open—particularly in medium-speed corners—thereby allowing more air to pass through the exhaust and over the diffuser, generating more downforce. Red Bull were cleared of wrongdoing, as, in the stewards' words, they had not technically broken any rules, but the FIA announced plans to rewrite the regulations governing throttle mapping so as to outlaw the practice entirely ahead of the Hungarian Grand Prix.

Tyre supplier Pirelli brought its white-banded medium compound tyre as the harder "prime" tyre and the yellow-banded soft compound tyre as the softer "option" tyre. It was the first time at the track in the single tyre supplier era (2008–present(Bridgestone then Pirelli)) where the 'supersoft' tyre had not been used.

Driver changes

Dani Clos took Narain Karthikeyan's place once again for the first free practice session on Friday morning. Jules Bianchi drove in the place of Nico Hülkenberg at Force India, while Valtteri Bottas drove for Williams, replacing Bruno Senna.

=== Race ===
At the end of the formation lap, Michael Schumacher stopped in the 19th place grid position, instead of 17th where he had qualified. Yellow lights were flashed as a result, with the intention of waving the cars through for a second formation lap. However, Schumacher switched his car off believing that the race was being delayed. The cars were waved through for the second formation lap, and Schumacher had to be pushed into the pits for his car to be restarted. Once his car was restarted, he failed to activate the pit speed limiter and exceeded the pit speed limit while driving to the end of the pits for the start of the race.

At the start of the race, Sebastian Vettel attempted to pass Romain Grosjean in turn one, but was blocked. The loss of momentum allowed Jenson Button to pull alongside Vettel through turn two and then pass him in turn three. Mark Webber, starting on medium compound tyres, made a great start to jump from 11th to 7th by turn two. Pastor Maldonado made a poor start and fell from 8th to 12th position.

Schumacher pitted on lap two to switch to medium compound tyres. He then served a drive-through penalty on lap five for speeding in the pit lane at the start. Kimi Räikkönen initially had no KERS and was stuck behind Fernando Alonso. Romain Grosjean began to catch up with Lewis Hamilton towards the end of the first stint. Hamilton pitted first on lap 19, taking a second longer than normal due to a wheel gun problem, but Grosjean's pit stop on the next lap was even slower, leaving the running order the same.

Romain Grosjean was finally able to catch Lewis Hamilton on lap 24, only to lose time due to mistakes, and then catch up again by lap 30. Kimi Räikkönen's KERS had recovered by this point, allowing him to make up ground. Jenson Button pitted from 3rd position on lap 35 and got stuck behind Bruno Senna, who was up to 7th running a long stint. Button was unable to pass Senna until Senna pitted on lap 43. This allowed Sebastian Vettel to come out ahead of Button when he pitted on lap 39.

Kimi Räikkönen began turning out blistering lap times in clear air. He pitted for the second time on lap 46, and came out of the pits alongside his teammate Romain Grosjean. Räikkönen pushed Grosjean to the edge of the track in turn 1, Grosjean ran wide, and Räikkönen took second place. Räikkönen then began to reel in Lewis Hamilton, but was unable to pass. Pastor Maldonado slid into the side of Paul di Resta on lap 48, earning Maldonado a drive-through penalty.

In the closing laps of the race, Red Bull pitted both of their drivers. Mark Webber fell from fifth to eighth, where he remained until the end of the race. Sebastian Vettel remained in fourth, and by the last lap was able to catch back up to Romain Grosjean on fresher tyres, but was unable to pass. Narain Karthikeyan pulled off the track and retired on lap 65 due to suspension damage. The final lap of the race was on lap 69 instead of 70 due to the extra formation lap.

This race marked Heikki Kovalainen's 100th race.

It would be eight years until the next race where no Red Bull, Mercedes or Ferrari driver was on the podium, the 2020 Italian Grand Prix.

As a result, Alonso extended the gap between himself and his nearest rival Webber to 40 points, with third-placed Vettel being only a further two points adrift. Hamilton managed to overtake Räikkönen to reclaim fourth place in the standings by one point following his win. In the Constructors' Championship, Red Bull maintained their lead after bringing up their total to 246 points, 53 clear of the nearest competition. After a relatively sub-par weekend, Ferrari fell from second to fourth, whilst both McLaren and Lotus climbed up one position each, with those three teams being separated by just four points.

== Classification ==
=== Qualifying ===
| Pos. | No. | Driver | Constructor | Part 1 | Part 2 | Part 3 | Grid |
|---|---|---|---|---|---|---|---|
| 1 | 4 | (United Kingdom) Lewis Hamilton | McLaren-Mercedes | 1:21.794 | 1:21.060 | 1:20.953 | 1 |
| 2 | 10 | (France) Romain Grosjean | Lotus-Renault | 1:22.755 | 1:21.657 | 1:21.366 | 2 |
| 3 | 1 | (Germany) Sebastian Vettel | Red Bull-Renault | 1:22.948 | 1:21.407 | 1:21.416 | 3 |
| 4 | 3 | (United Kingdom) Jenson Button | McLaren-Mercedes | 1:22.028 | 1:21.618 | 1:21.583 | 4 |
| 5 | 9 | (Finland) Kimi Räikkönen | Lotus-Renault | 1:22.234 | 1:21.583 | 1:21.730 | 5 |
| 6 | 5 | (Spain) Fernando Alonso | Ferrari | 1:22.095 | 1:21.598 | 1:21.844 | 6 |
| 7 | 6 | (Brazil) Felipe Massa | Ferrari | 1:22.203 | 1:21.534 | 1:21.900 | 7 |
| 8 | 18 | (Venezuela) Pastor Maldonado | Williams-Renault | 1:22.475 | 1:21.504 | 1:21.939 | 8 |
| 9 | 19 | (Brazil) Bruno Senna | Williams-Renault | 1:22.271 | 1:21.697 | 1:22.343 | 9 |
| 10 | 12 | (Germany) Nico Hülkenberg | Force India-Mercedes | 1:22.176 | 1:21.653 | 1:22.847 | 10 |
| 11 | 2 | (Australia) Mark Webber | Red Bull-Renault | 1:22.829 | 1:21.715 | | 11 |
| 12 | 11 | (United Kingdom) Paul di Resta | Force India-Mercedes | 1:21.912 | 1:21.813 | | 12 |
| 13 | 8 | (Germany) Nico Rosberg | Mercedes | 1:22.079 | 1:21.895 | | 13 |
| 14 | 15 | (Mexico) Sergio Pérez | Sauber-Ferrari | 1:22.110 | 1:21.895 | | 14 |
| 15 | 14 | (Japan) Kamui Kobayashi | Sauber-Ferrari | 1:22.801 | 1:22.300 | | 15 |
| 16 | 17 | (France) Jean-Éric Vergne | Toro Rosso-Ferrari | 1:22.799 | 1:22.380 | | 16 |
| 17 | 7 | (Germany) Michael Schumacher | Mercedes | 1:22.436 | 1:22.723 | | 17 |
| 18 | 16 | (Australia) Daniel Ricciardo | Toro Rosso-Ferrari | 1:23.250 | | | 18 |
| 19 | 20 | (Finland) Heikki Kovalainen | Caterham-Renault | 1:23.576 | | | 19 |
| 20 | 21 | (Russia) Vitaly Petrov | Caterham-Renault | 1:24.167 | | | 20 |
| 21 | 25 | (France) Charles Pic | Marussia-Cosworth | 1:25.244 | | | 21 |
| 22 | 24 | (Germany) Timo Glock | Marussia-Cosworth | 1:25.476 | | | 22 |
| 23 | 22 | (Spain) Pedro de la Rosa | HRT-Cosworth | 1:25.916 | | | 23 |
| 24 | 23 | (India) Narain Karthikeyan | HRT-Cosworth | 1:26.178 | | | 24 |
107% time: 1:27.519

=== Race ===
| Pos | No | Driver | Constructor | Laps | Time/Retired | Grid | Points |
|---|---|---|---|---|---|---|---|
| 1 | 4 | (United Kingdom) Lewis Hamilton | McLaren-Mercedes | 69 | 1:41:05.503 | 1 | 25 |
| 2 | 9 | (Finland) Kimi Räikkönen | Lotus-Renault | 69 | +1.032 | 5 | 18 |
| 3 | 10 | (France) Romain Grosjean | Lotus-Renault | 69 | +10.518 | 2 | 15 |
| 4 | 1 | (Germany) Sebastian Vettel | Red Bull-Renault | 69 | +11.614 | 3 | 12 |
| 5 | 5 | (Spain) Fernando Alonso | Ferrari | 69 | +26.653 | 6 | 10 |
| 6 | 3 | (United Kingdom) Jenson Button | McLaren-Mercedes | 69 | +30.243 | 4 | 8 |
| 7 | 19 | (Brazil) Bruno Senna | Williams-Renault | 69 | +33.899 | 9 | 6 |
| 8 | 2 | (Australia) Mark Webber | Red Bull-Renault | 69 | +34.458 | 11 | 4 |
| 9 | 6 | (Brazil) Felipe Massa | Ferrari | 69 | +38.350 | 7 | 2 |
| 10 | 8 | (Germany) Nico Rosberg | Mercedes | 69 | +51.234 | 13 | 1 |
| 11 | 12 | (Germany) Nico Hülkenberg | Force India-Mercedes | 69 | +57.283 | 10 | |
| 12 | 11 | (United Kingdom) Paul di Resta | Force India-Mercedes | 69 | +1:02.887 | 12 | |
| 13 | 18 | (Venezuela) Pastor Maldonado | Williams-Renault | 69 | +1:03.606 | 8 | |
| 14 | 15 | (Mexico) Sergio Pérez | Sauber-Ferrari | 69 | +1:04.494 | 14 | |
| 15 | 16 | (Australia) Daniel Ricciardo | Toro Rosso-Ferrari | 68 | +1 Lap | 18 | |
| 16 | 17 | (France) Jean-Éric Vergne | Toro Rosso-Ferrari | 68 | +1 Lap | 16 | |
| 17 | 20 | (Finland) Heikki Kovalainen | Caterham-Renault | 68 | +1 Lap | 19 | |
| 18 | 14 | (Japan) Kamui Kobayashi | Sauber-Ferrari | 67 | Hydraulics | 15 | |
| 19 | 21 | (Russia) Vitaly Petrov | Caterham-Renault | 67 | +2 Laps | 20 | |
| 20 | 25 | (France) Charles Pic | Marussia-Cosworth | 67 | +2 Laps | 21 | |
| 21 | 24 | (Germany) Timo Glock | Marussia-Cosworth | 66 | +3 Laps | 22 | |
| 22 | 22 | (Spain) Pedro de la Rosa | HRT-Cosworth | 66 | +3 Laps | 23 | |
| Ret | 23 | (India) Narain Karthikeyan | HRT-Cosworth | 60 | Steering | 24 | |
| Ret | 7 | (Germany) Michael Schumacher | Mercedes | 58 | Technical | PL^{1} | |

Notes

- ^1 – Michael Schumacher started the race from the pitlane.

== Championship standings after the race ==
Drivers' Championship standings

| | Pos. | Driver | Points |
|---|---|---|---|
| | 1 | (Spain) Fernando Alonso | 164 |
| | 2 | (Australia) Mark Webber | 124 |
| | 3 | (Germany) Sebastian Vettel | 122 |
| 1 | 4 | (United Kingdom) Lewis Hamilton | 117 |
| 1 | 5 | (Finland) Kimi Räikkönen | 116 |

Constructors' Championship standings

| | Pos. | Constructor | Points |
|---|---|---|---|
| | 1 | (Austria) Red Bull-Renault | 246 |
| 1 | 2 | (United Kingdom) McLaren-Mercedes | 193 |
| 1 | 3 | (United Kingdom) Lotus-Renault | 192 |
| 2 | 4 | (Italy) Ferrari | 189 |
| | 5 | (Germany) Mercedes | 106 |

- Note: Only the top five positions are included for both sets of standings.

== See also ==
- 2012 Hungaroring GP2 Series round
- 2012 Hungaroring GP3 Series round

| Previous race: 2012 German Grand Prix | FIA Formula One World Championship; 2012 season | Next race: 2012 Belgian Grand Prix |
| Previous race: 2011 Hungarian Grand Prix | Hungarian Grand Prix | Next race: 2013 Hungarian Grand Prix |
