= John Loyer =

American basketball coach

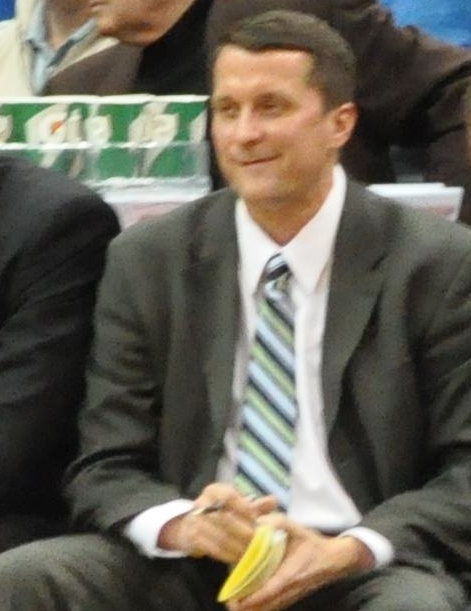
- Loyer as an assistant coach with the Detroit Pistons in 2012

Los Angeles Clippers
- Title: Director of Pro Scouting

Personal information
- Born: December 29, 1964 (age 61) Galion, Ohio, U.S.
- Listed height: 6 ft 4 in (1.93 m)

Career information
- High school: Northmor (Galion, Ohio)
- College: Akron (1983–1987)
- NBA draft: 1983: undrafted
- Position: Guard
- Coaching career: 1987–2014

Career history

Coaching
- 1987–1989: Akron (assistant)
- 1989–1999: Cincinnati (assistant)
- 1999–2000: Wabash Valley CC
- 2003–2005: Portland Trail Blazers (assistant)
- 2005–2009: Philadelphia 76ers (assistant)
- 2009–2011: New Jersey Nets (assistant)
- 2011–2014: Detroit Pistons (assistant)
- 2014: Detroit Pistons (interim)

John Foster Loyer (born December 29, 1964) is an American basketball executive and former professional basketball coach.

Loyer graduated from Northmor High School in Galion, Ohio in 1983. Loyer was the leading scorer for Northmor as a senior. He played college basketball at the University of Akron from 1983 to 1987 and graduated from Akron in 1988 with a degree in social studies. In 1987, he began his career as assistant coach at Akron under Bob Huggins. In 1989, Loyer followed Huggins to the University of Cincinnati and served as assistant coach until 1999. Loyer got his first head coaching job at Wabash Valley College in 1999 and coached there for one season.

In 2000, Loyer became video coordinator for the NBA's Portland Trail Blazers. From 2001 to 2003, Loyer was an advance scout for the Blazers, then was an assistant coach from 2003 to 2005 under Maurice Cheeks. Loyer then followed Cheeks to the Philadelphia 76ers and was an assistant coach from 2005 to 2009. After Cheeks was fired during the 2008–09 season, Loyer stayed on the staff of interim head coach Tony DiLeo.

In 2009, Loyer joined the staff of New Jersey Nets head coach Lawrence Frank and remained assistant coach to the team until 2011. Loyer served under Avery Johnson in the 2010–11 season. Loyer became an assistant coach for the Detroit Pistons in 2011 and again served on the staff of Lawrence Frank. He became reunited with Maurice Cheeks after Cheeks became head coach in 2013. On February 9, 2014, after the Pistons fired head coach Maurice Cheeks, Loyer was named interim head coach.

By 2017 Loyer had become a scout for the Los Angeles Clippers. As of 2025, Loyer was the director of pro scouting for the Clippers.

He is the father of 2018 Mr. Basketball of Michigan winner Foster Loyer and 2022 Indiana Mr. Basketball runner-up Fletcher Loyer. His daughter, Jersey, is a Division I volleyball player at Butler University.

== Head coaching record ==
Legend
Regular season	G	Games coached	W	Games won	L	Games lost	W–L %	Win–loss %
Playoffs	PG	Playoff games	PW	Playoff wins	PL	Playoff losses	PW–L %	Playoff win–loss %

Team	Year	G	W	L	W–L%	Finish	PG	PW	PL	PW–L%	Result
Detroit	2013–14	32	8	24	.250	4th in Central	—	—	—	—	Missed Playoffs
Career		32	8	24	.250					–	
