= Suzanne Royce =

US Chief Scrutineer for motorsport competitions

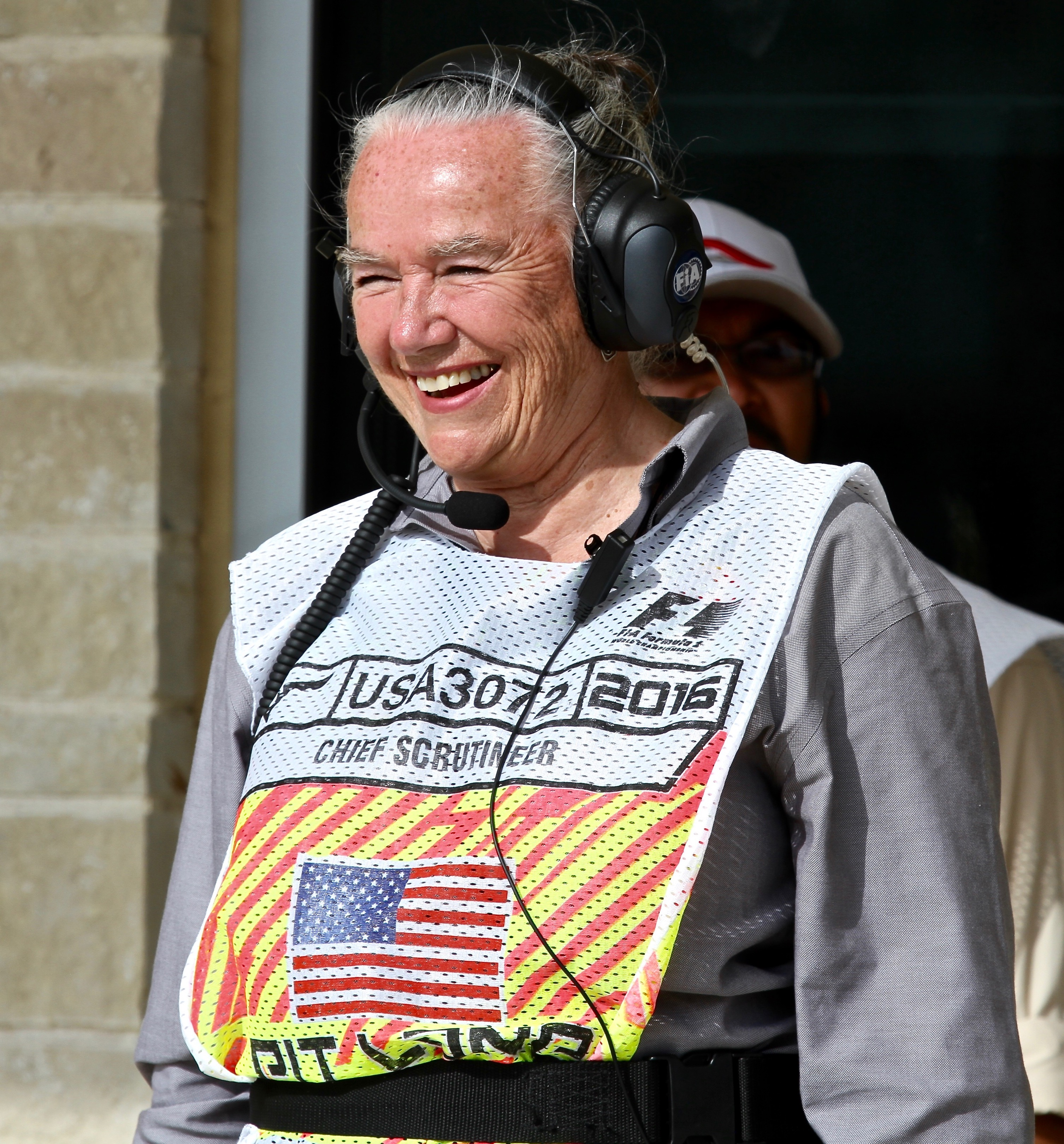
- Royce at the 2016 US Grand Prix in Austin.
- Born: Suzanne Margaret Curtis; 19 November 1946; Cleckheaton, Yorkshire, England
- Died: 5 March 2022 (aged 75); Detroit, Michigan, USA
- Occupations: US National Chief Scrutineer, FIA Motorsport
- Years active: 1985 - 2021
- Known for: First woman to hold an ACCUS-FIA International License for Scrutineering

Suzanne Royce (19 November 1946 – 5 March 2022) was the Chief Scrutineer in the United States for FIA Formula 1, FIM MotoGP, Formula E, the FIA World Endurance Championship, and other international motorsports events. She was the first woman to be granted an FIA International Chief Scrutineer License in the world, when she received it in 1986. While no definitive list exists, it is believed that (through 2020) she was the only woman to have held this role for Formula One. On 28 November 2020, Royce was honored by the FIA as the Best Chief Scrutineer of the year during its annual Volunteers Weekend recognition. Royce was recognized by COTA and the FIA on 24 October 2021, at the US Grand Prix as she retired from active involvement with international motorsport.

Royce died on 5 March 2022, due to complications from COVID-19. She was fully vaccinated, but contracted the virus while in the hospital for routine surgery.

On 2 November 2025, Royce was posthumously recognized with the Lifetime Dedication Award from the Michigan Motorsports Hall of Fame

== Motorsports career ==
Royce emigrated from the United Kingdom to the United States in 1970. She began her involvement as a scrutineer with the Detroit Region of the Sports Car Club of America in the early 1970s, serving as Chief Scrutineer for her first regional event by 1976. When Formula 1 came to Detroit in 1982, she volunteered as a member of the scrutineering team. She quickly took on a leadership role, becoming co-Chief Scrutineer in 1985 and taking over the reins independently in 1986.

She served as the sole Chief Scrutineer for Formula 1 in the United States from 1985 through 2021. After the United States Grand Prix moved to the Circuit of the Americas (COTA - Austin, TX) in 2012, she was also asked to serve as Chief Scrutineer for other international motorsports events at COTA, Sebring, and various street circuits throughout the US.

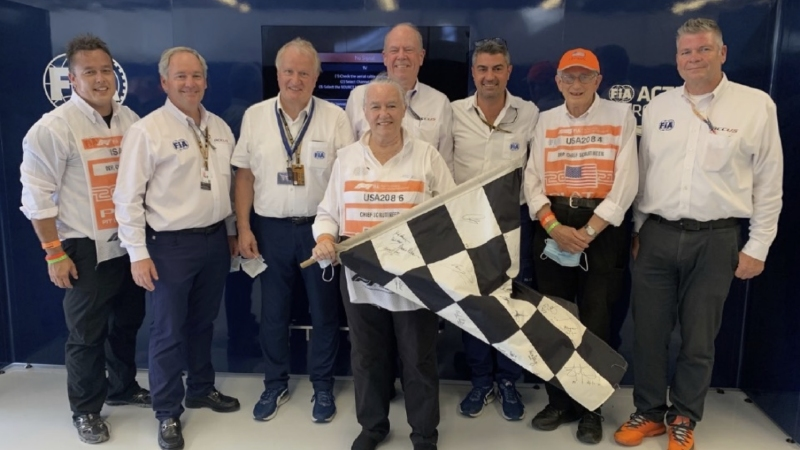
In honor of her retirement, Suzanne Royce is presented with the checkered flag from the 2021 US Grand Prix at COTA. Accompanied by (L to R) Adam Gavalla (F1 Deputy Chief Scrutineer), Tim Mayer (FIA Steward and COTA race organizer), Jo Bauer (FIA Technical Delegate), Dennis Dean (FIA Steward), Michael Masi (FIA Race Director), Michael Royce (F1 Deputy Chief Scrutineer), and Paul Walter (FIA and IMSA). The flag was signed by the top three finishers of the race (Max Verstappen, Lewis Hamilton, and Sergio Perez), FIA officials, and members of her 2021 scrutineering team.

International Motor Sports Resume Suzanne Royce - Chief Scrutineer
Years	Series, race and location
1985 - 1988	FIA Formula 1 - Detroit Grand Prix (Detroit Street Circuit)
1989 - 1991	FIA Formula 1 - United States Grand Prix (Phoenix Street Circuit)
2000 - 2007	FIA Formula 1 - United States Grand Prix (Indianapolis Motor Speedway)
2008 - 2015	FIM MotoGP - Indianapolis Grand Prix (Indianapolis Motor Speedway)
2012 - 2019, 2021	FIA Formula 1 - United States Grand Prix (Circuit of the Americas, Austin)
2013	Australian V8 Supercars - Austin 400 (Circuit of the Americas, Austin)
2013 - 2019, 2021	FIM MotoGP - Grand Prix of the Americas (Circuit of the Americas, Austin)
2013 - 2017, 2020	FIA World Endurance Championship - Lone Star Le Mans (Circuit of the Americas, Austin)
2015	FIA Formula E - Miami ePrix (Biscayne Bay Street Circuit)
2015 - 2016	FIA Formula E - Long Beach ePrix (Long Beach Street Circuit)
2017 - 2019, 2021	FIA Formula E - New York City ePrix (Brooklyn Street Circuit)
2018	FIA World Rallycross Championship - World RX of USA (Circuit of the Americas, Austin)
2019	FIA World Endurance Championship - 1000 Miles of Sebring (Sebring Int'l Raceway)

In 2012, Royce co-authored a book entitled Learn & Compete: A Primer for Formula SAE, Formula Student, and Formula Hybrid Teams. The book provides an introduction to the engineering and team management aspects that students may want to consider as they participate in the Formula SAE, Formula Student, or Formula Hybrid competitions.
