= Senator Royce =

Senator Royce may refer to:

== Surnamed Royce ==
- Ed Royce (born 1951), California State Senate, USA
- George E. Royce (1829–1903), Vermont State Senate, USA

== Givennamed Royce ==
- Royce Duplessis, Louisiana State Senate, USA
- Royce Frith (1923–2009), Canadian federal senator
- Royce West (born 1952), Texas State Senate, USA

== See also ==
- Royce (disambiguation)
