= Justice Royce =

Justice Royce or Judge Royce, may refer to:

- Homer Elihu Royce (1819–1851), associate justice and chief justice of the Vermont Supreme Court, USA
- John Royce (born 1944; styled The Hon. Mr Justice Royce), a judge of the High Court of England and Wales
- Stephen Royce (1787–1868), associate justice and chief justice of the Vermont Supreme Court, USA

== See also ==
- Royce Lamberth (born 1943), a senior judge of the United States District Court for the District of Columbia
- Royce R. Lewellen (1930–2020), a judge on the California Superior Court, USA
- Royce H. Savage (1904–1993), a U.S. district court judge
- Royce (disambiguation)
