= Northmor High School =

Location
- 7819 State Route 19; Galion, Ohio 44833; United States; 40°38′26″N 82°45′51″W

Information
- Type: Public, Coeducational
- Established: 1963
- School district: Northmor Local School District
- Principal: Brendan Gwirtz
- Teaching staff: 36.00 (FTE)
- Grades: 7–12
- Student to teacher ratio: 12.39
- Campus type: Rural
- Colors: Black, gold, & white
- Athletics conference: Knox Morrow Athletic Conference (KMAC)
- Team name: Golden Knights
- Accreditation: Ohio Department of Education
- Website: www.knightpride.org/page/jrsr-high-school

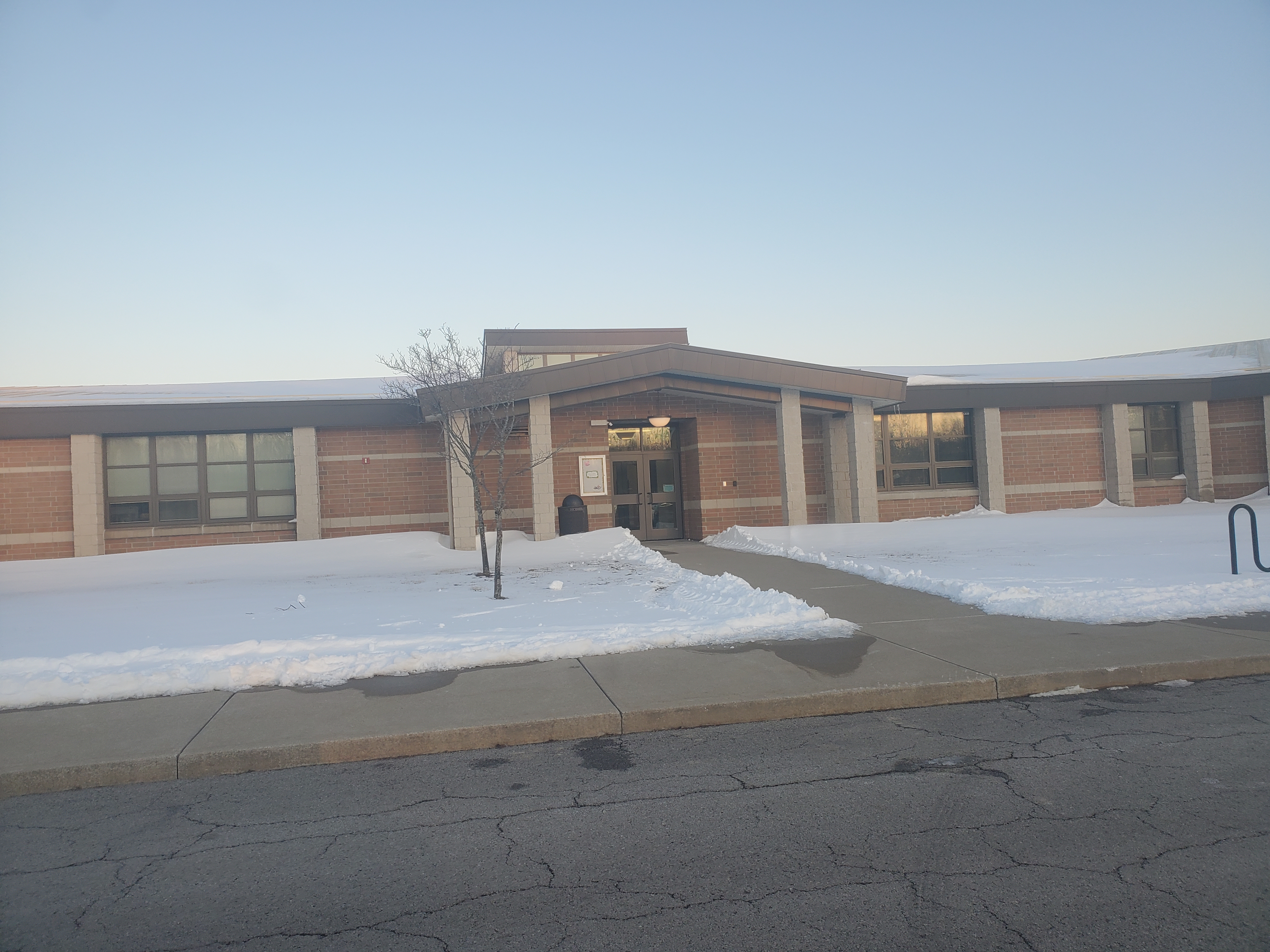
Northmor High School.jpg

Northmor High School is a public high school in North Bloomfield Township, south of Galion, Ohio, United States. It was founded in 1963 and is the only high school in the Northmor Local School District. Athletic teams are known as the Golden Knights and school colors are black, gold, and white. It is housed in the Northmor K–12 building, which opened in August 2011 and also includes Northmor Elementary School and Northmor Junior High School. While the schools share common areas and the high school and junior high share the same bell schedule, they are administered separately.

The first graduating class was in 1964. The name "Northmor" is a portmanteau from the school district being located in northern Morrow County.

== Notable alumni ==
- C. B. Dollaway - professional mixed martial artist in the Ultimate Fighting Championship (UFC)
- Marsha Reall - women's college basketball head coach
- John Loyer - American college basketball player and American basketball assistant coach
