= Bill Royce =

American football player (born 1971)

No. 85
- Position: Defensive end
- Class: 1993

Personal information
- Born: July 14, 1971 (age 55); Mount Gilead, Ohio
- Listed height: 6 ft 2 in (1.88 m)
- Listed weight: 255 lb (116 kg)

Career information
- High school: Northmor
- College: Ashland (1990-93)
- College Football Hall of Fame (Class of 2016)

Bill Royce (born July 14, 1971) is an American former college football player. He is currently a sales executive for Astec Industries Materials Solutions Group. While at Northmor High School, Royce had top eight finishes during the 1989 Ohio High School Athletic Association championship. At Ashland College, Royce was fourth at the shot put held during the 1992 NCAA Division II men's indoor track and field championships. With the Ashland Eagles football team, he was a Player of the Year for the Midwest Intercollegiate Football Conference and nominated for the Harlon Hill Trophy twice. Royce's 71 sacks became a career record the school and the National Collegiate Athletic Association.

Outside of football, Royce began his recycling career with Eagle Crusher during 2002. He held executive positions with the company before joining KPI-JCI and Astec Mobile Screens in 2011. Royce continued to work in sales there throughout the 2010s before joining Astec. Royce joined the College Football Hall of Fame during 2016.

== Early life ==
Royce was born on July 14, 1971, in Mount Gilead, Ohio. During the late 1980s, he was nicknamed "Rolls" while on the football team for Northmor High School. With the team, Royce was a linebacker and wide receiver. Royce was an All-Mid Ohio Conference player during 1986. He also was on "the 1988 United Press International Division V all-Ohio football team." That year, he received a varsity letter. Overall, Royce accumulated 2839 yards.

With the Lexington Lions All-Stars, Royce played in the 1989 McDonald's Football Classic. Outside of football, he participated in athletics while at Northmour. As a Class A athlete, he entered the Ohio High School Athletic Association championship in 1989. At the event, he had top eight finishes in the shotput and discus.

== College career ==
With a scholarship, Royce signed to Ashland College in 1989.

While with the Ashland Eagles throughout the early 1990s, Royce was a tight end before becoming a defensive end. From 1991 to 1993, Royce consecutively had the most season sacks for the school. During this time period, Royce set season records in sacks for the Midwest Intercollegiate Football Conference multiple times. He injured his ACL during the 1994 Snow Bowl. That year, he underwent rehabilitation and surgery for his knee injury.

After his time at Ashland, Royce set the National Collegiate Athletic Association career sacks record with 71 sacks. His sacks remained a career record at Ashland during 2023. As an athlete, he "[won] the 19-to-24 year-old discus event" at the 1991 Ohio Sports Festival. The following year, He was fourth in shot put at the NCAA Division II men's indoor track and field championships. Outside of sports, Royce studied business administration at Ashland.

== Post-football career ==
Royce had worked "in the finance, banking and insurance industries" before joining Eagle Crusher in 2002. During his recycling career, he became Territory Sales Manager the following year. During 2010, he was the company's president. In 2011, Royce was in sales with KPI-JCI and Astec Mobile Screens. Throughout the 2010s, he worked there as a regional sales manager. By 2020, he joined Astec Industries Materials Solutions Group at Summerlin, Nevada. With Astec, he continued his regional executive career during 2023.

== Awards and honors ==
In 1991, Royce was named an All-MIFC player and won the Best Defensive Back for Ashland. While being re-selected as an All-MIFC player, he won the Player of the Year award once and the Defensive Lineman of the Year award twice leading up to 1993. Royce was nominated twice for the Harlon Hill Trophy.

Royce was on The Associated Press Little All-America team during 1992 and 1993. In athletics, he was an All-American during 1992. He was inducted into the Ashland University Hall of Fame in 2005 and the College Football Hall of Fame in 2016.
