= Royce =

Royce may refer to:

== Places ==
=== Physical geography ===
- Royce Brook, a creek in New Jersey, USA
- Royce Peak, a mountain in California, USA

=== Settlements ===
- Royce, Alberta, Canada; an inhabited locality
- Royce, Michigan, United States; a ghost town

=== Facilities and structures ===
- Royce Hall, on the campus of the University of California, Los Angeles; in Los Angeles, California, USA
- ROYCE' Town Station, a train station in Tōbetsu, Hokkaidō, Japan

== People ==
=== Surname ===
- Royce (surname)

=== Given name ===
- Royce D. Applegate (1939–2003), American actor and screenwriter
- Royce Ayliffe, Australian rugby league footballer
- Royce Berry (born 1946), American professional football defensive end
- Royce Brownlie (born 1980), Australian football (soccer) player
- Royce Campbell (born 1952), jazz guitarist
- Royce Chan (born 1978), Hong Kong rugby union player
- Royce Clayton (born 1970), American Major League Baseball shortstop
- Royce de Mel, first indigenous commander of the Sri Lanka Navy
- Royce Deppe (born 1965), South African tennis player
- Royce Freeman (born 1996), American football player
- Royce Frith (1923–2005), Canadian diplomat and politician
- Royce Gracie (born 1966), Brazilian jiu-jitsu master
- Royce Hart (born 1948), Australian rules football player and coach
- Royce Herron (born 1948), American actress and educator
- Royce Lewis (born 1999), American baseball player
- Royce Money (born 1942), Chancellor and former president of Abilene Christian University
- Royce Newman (born 1997), American football player
- Royce Pollard (1939–2025), American politician, mayor of Vancouver, Washington State
- Royce Pollard (American football) (born 1989), American footballer
- Royce Ryton (1924–2009), English playwright
- Royce Simmons (born 1960), Australian rugby league coach and former player
- Royce Wallace (1925–1992), American actress, singer and dancer
- Royce West (born 1952), Democratic member of the Texas Senate
- Royce White (born 1991), American basketball player and politician

=== Stage name ===
- Prince Royce (born 1989), American singer and songwriter
- Royce da 5'9" (born 1977), American rapper and songwriter

=== By title ===
- Senator Royce (disambiguation)
- Justice Royce (disambiguation) or Judge Royce
- Royce baronets, a peerage title in the United Kingdom

== Fictional characters ==
- Clarence Royce, on the HBO television drama The Wire
- Mitchell Royce, a comic book character by Warren Ellis
- Royce, in the 2010 film Predators, portrayed by Adrien Brody
- Royce Mumphrey, aka Cave Guy, from Freakazoid!
- House Royce, a fictional family in George R. R. Martin's A Song of Ice and Fire

== Groups, companies, organizations ==
- Royce', a Japanese chocolate manufacturing company
- Royce watches, a Swiss watch company
- Royce Investment Partners

== Other uses ==
- Royce (film), starring Jim Belushi

== See also ==
- Rolls-Royce (disambiguation)
