= Jo Bauer =

German technical delegate (born 1961)

- Born: Joachim Bauer; 21 July 1961 (age 65)

Joachim Bauer (born 21 July 1961) is the FIA Formula One Technical Delegate at Grand Prix races. He took over the job from Charlie Whiting in 1997 when Whiting was appointed as Race Director for Formula One races.

== Education ==
Bauer is an automotive engineer who studied at the Rheinisch-Westfälische Technische Hochschule in Aachen, Germany. After finishing his bachelor's degree Bauer went on to get a Masters while working with the automotive engineering firm FEV Motorentechnik GmbH.

== Career ==
In 1992, he worked at the Oberste Nationale Sportkomission, where he was head of the technical department. With this role, he also received a seat in the FIA Technical Commission. In 1995, he was the technical delegate for the International Touring Car series before becoming the FIA Formula One Technical Delegate in 1997.

Key moments in his Formula One career include when he reported Charles Leclerc and Lewis Hamilton to the stewards during the 2023 United States Grand Prix, resulting in a disqualification for both drivers. At the 2024 Monaco Grand Prix, Bauer reported a breach of technical regulations with regard to the Haas vehicle's drag reduction system, which disqualified the qualifying results of Kevin Magnussen and Nico Hülkenberg. At the 2025 Chinese Grand Prix, he reported Charles Leclerc, Pierre Gasly and Lewis Hamilton to the stewards, resulting in their disqualification.
