= Caroline Billin Currie =

English miniature-painter (1849–1940)

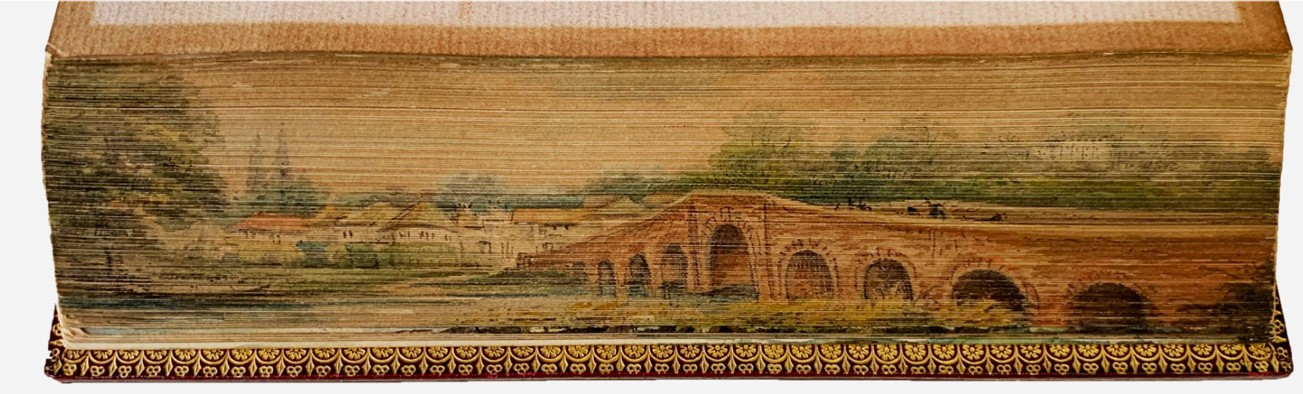
- 'A View of Sonning Bridge', fore-edge painting by Currie from 1927/8
- Born: Caroline Billin Curry; 12 December 1849; Helston, Cornwall
- Died: 2 April 1940 (aged 90)
- Occupation: Miniature-painter
- Known for: Providing miniature art for all Cosway book-bindings

Caroline Billin Currie (known professionally as C. B. Currie or Miss Currie, 1849–1940) was an English miniature-painter and fore-edge painter best known for her work on Cosway bindings.

== Life and career ==
She was born Caroline Billin Curry, the youngest of twelve children, in Helston, Cornwall, in 1849.

By 1901, she was working for John Harrison Stonehouse in London at the Henry Sotheran & Co. bookshop. Listed as a 'copyist', she did not attach her name to her work until 1911 when the popularity of her paintings made her the first individual named in the Sotheran catalogue as an artist. She painted ivory miniatures for the Cosway bindings produced by the bookbinder Rivière, later progressing onto fore-edges.

== Art ==
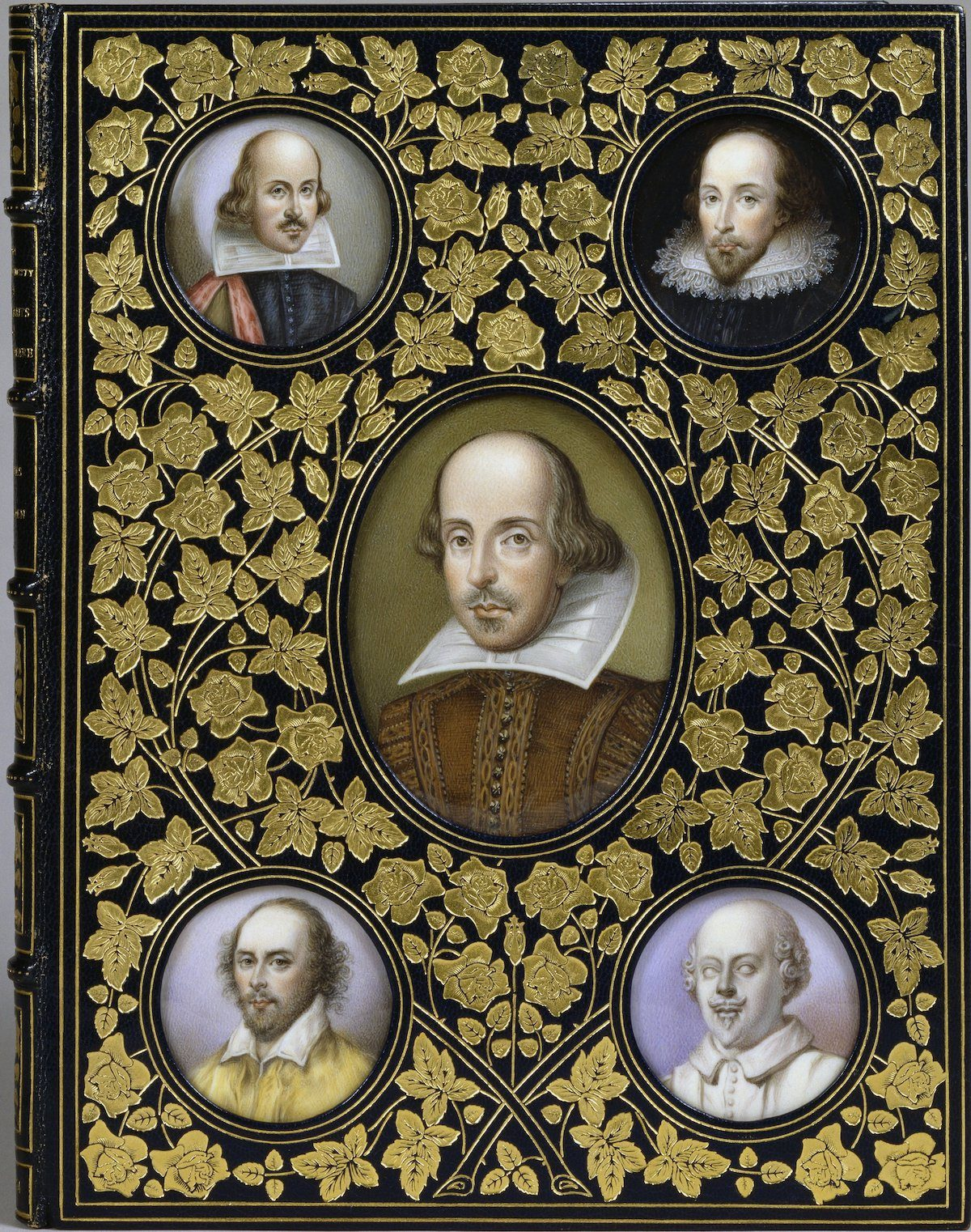
Currie's Five Faces of Shakespeare, a Cosway binding from 1928 that contains 5 miniatures painted by Currie that contain copies of 4 of Shakespere's portraits and the bust in Shakespeare's funerary monument.

Currie's fore-edge paintings often reproduced photographs or other works of art, sometimes unrelated to the content of their books. She was a versatile artist rendering subjects including portraits, international landscapes, and even a cricket match. Currie is often acknowledged as one of the most talented and prestigious miniature-painters of the twentieth century.

Currie was unusual among miniature-artists in that she signed and numbered her fore-edge paintings, inserting a limitation statement on a colophon page with her stamped or inked signature from 1913. A total of 172 of her unique fore-edge paintings are known. She is also thought to have worked on most of the thousand miniatures appearing in Cosway bindings. The presence of one or more Currie illustrations is diagnostic of a true Cosway binding.

She continued painting until three years before her death in 1940, and was succeeded as Rivière's fore-edge painter by Helen Haywood.
