= William Hobart Royce =

American poet (1878–1963)

William Hobart Royce (/rɔɪs/; 20 March 1878 – 28 January 1963) was an American writer and bookseller who was an expert on Honoré de Balzac. Royce published poetry under his own name and under his pen name Willie Penmore.

== Early life ==
Born on March 20, 1878, in Springfield, Massachusetts, Royce graduated from the Springfield High School in 1897 but did not attend college. He later said that his "only university has been the New York Public Library."

== Balzac ==
Royce lived his life in emulation of Balzac and was the founder (1940) and president of the Balzac Society of America. In 1935, Royce was awarded the Cross of the Legion of Honor and was made an honorary citizen of Issoudun, where Balzac's La Rabouilleuse was set.

== Career ==
Royce worked first in a bookshop in Springfield, before moving to New York where he spent twelve years with the American News Company followed by seven years at Max Harzof's Lexington Book Shop. According to Harzof, Royce's "main virtue was that he could be implicitly trusted with bags of uncounted gold". In 1917 Royce joined the Gabriel Wells bookselling firm where he stayed for over 30 years. In Wells, Royce met someone with a fascination with Balzac as great as his own and the shop became a centre for the sale of all types of Balzaciana. It was Wells who prevented Balzac's house at Passy from destruction.

== Family ==
Royce married Eda Maria Wallin in 1908. They had two daughters, Eva Allen Qoyce and Abbie Anna Royce.

== Papers ==
Royce's papers, including those of the Balzac Society of America, are in the library of Syracuse University.

== Selected publications ==
Balzac

- Balzac, Immortal. 1926.
- A Balzac Bibliography. Chicago: University of Chicago Press, 1929.
- Indexes to A Balzac Bibliography. Chicago: University of Chicago Press, 1930.
- Balzac as he should be read. 1946.

Poetry

- Remember Pearl Harbor! n.d.
- The Bookman's Lament. n.d.
- Balzac was Right, A Sonnet Sequence. New York, A. Giraldi, 1943.
