= John Harrison Stonehouse =

English bookseller (1864–1937)

- Born: 1864; Wilton, Wiltshire, England
- Died: 27 August 1937 (aged 72–73); Middlesex, England
- Occupations: Bookseller; author
- Known for: Introduced and popularised the "Cosway" binding; Commissioning the lost jewelled edition of The Rubaiyat of Omar Khayyam; Works on Charles Dickens

John Harrison Stonehouse (1864 – 27 August 1937) was an English bookseller and Charles Dickens scholar at long-established London booksellers Henry Sotheran Ltd where he rose from apprentice to managing director through hard work and a strong entrepreneurial instinct. He introduced and popularised the "Cosway" binding and commissioned the opulent edition of Edward FitzGerald's The Rubaiyat of Omar Khayyam that was lost when RMS Titanic sank in 1912. He published a book on the subject in 1933.

He became a specialist in manuscripts and acquired a previously unknown collection of Dickens material relating to a youthful romance between the author and Maria Beadnell, his notes on which were turned into a book published in the United States. He later published a book about Dickens's early life. He also acquired 37 volumes of material relating to the prophetess Joanna Southcott, and a collection of "intimate" letters between the playwright Richard Brinsley Sheridan and Georgiana Cavendish, Duchess of Devonshire.

He was president of the Antiquarian Booksellers' Association in 1936. He died in 1937 and received an obituary from the poet Siegfried Sassoon titled "Adventurer in Bookselling". He left little money, forcing his widow to seek financial assistance from his former employers.

== Early life and family ==
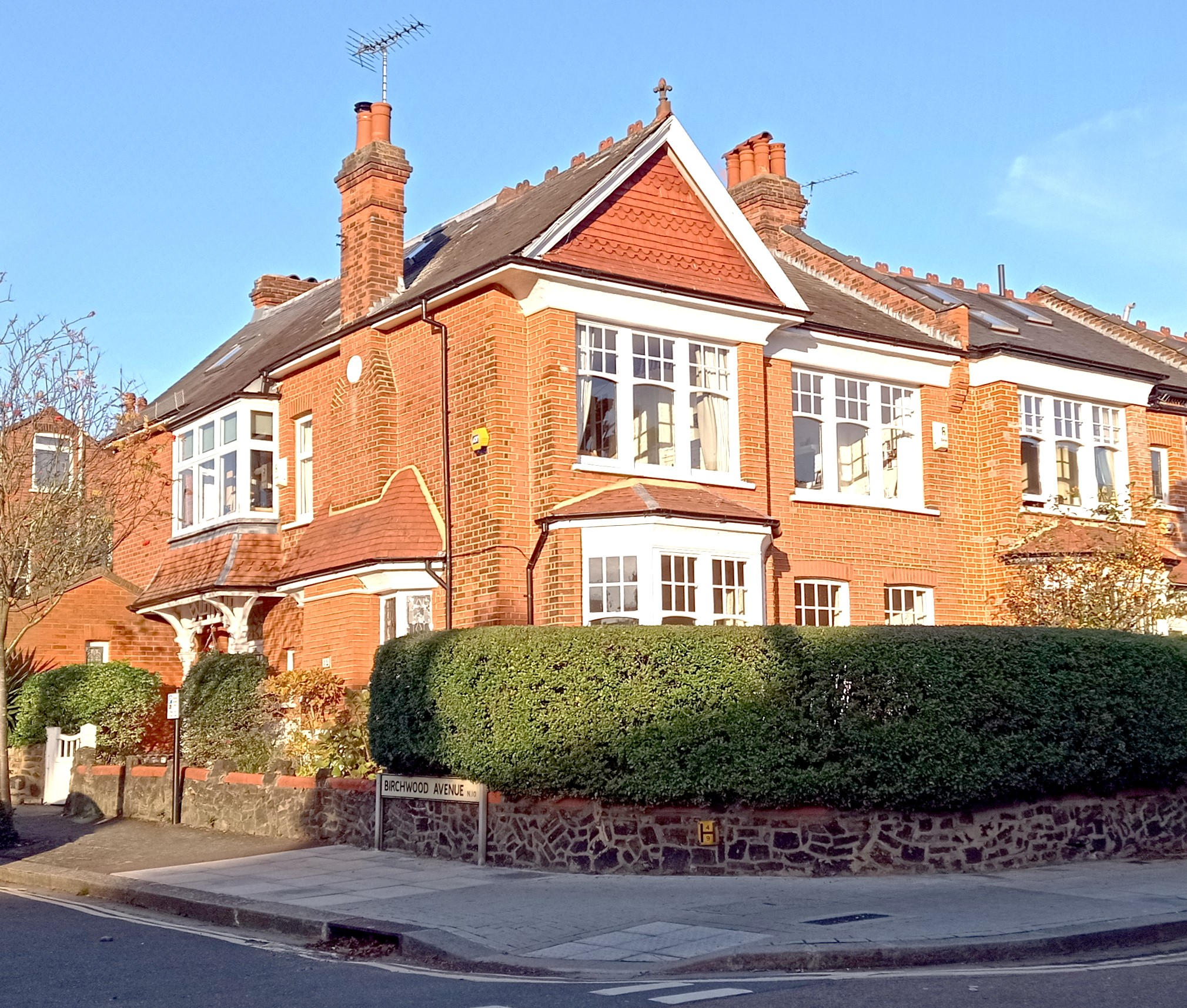
Stonehouse's former home in Muswell Hill, north London, seen in 2022

John Stonehouse was born in Wilton, Wiltshire, in 1864. He married Mary Martha. In 1891 they were living in Albert Street, Camden Town, and in 1901, Bramshill Gardens, Dartmouth Park, to the north of Kentish Town. By 1901 they had children Dorothy, Joseph, and Ida. Later, the Stonehouses lived at 19 Grand Avenue in Muswell Hill, north London.

== Career ==
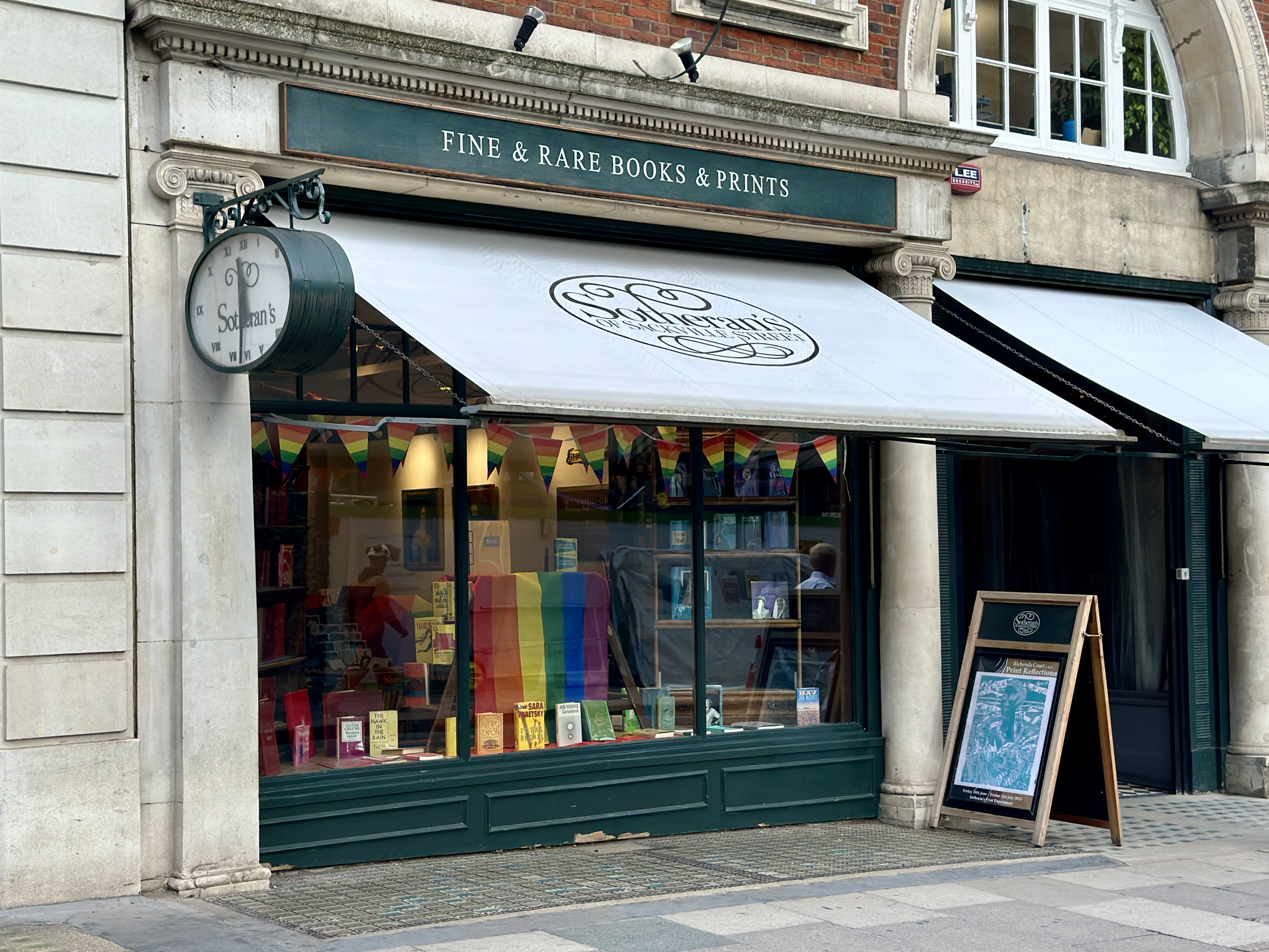
Henry Sotheran Ltd, London

In 1884, Stonehouse joined the London book dealers Henry Sotheran Ltd as an apprentice, ultimately rising to the position of managing director through his skills of literacy, invention, and marketing. There, he worked with figures such as Henry Cecil Sotheran ("Cecil Sotheran" 1861-1928), the last Sotheran to run the firm, the scientific literature specialist and bibliographer Heinrich Zeitlinger, and manager and book scout Alexander Railton. He became a specialist in manuscripts and in 1905 acquired for his employers a previously unknown collection of Dickens material. In 1906 he acquired 37 volumes of material relating to the prophetess Joanna Southcott, and in 1908 purchased the "intimate" letters between Richard Brinsley Sheridan and Georgiana Cavendish, Duchess of Devonshire.

When Cecil Sotheran was killed in a motor accident in 1928, it was Stonehouse that prevented the firm from being wound-up by persuading his friend and fellow bookseller Gabriel Wells to buy it and recoup his outlay by selling shares in the firm. One investor was the banker and collector Anthony de Rothschild which ultimately led to the banking firm of that name buying the whole firm in 1957.

In 1933, he began to produce Piccadilly Notes, a continuously paginated publication that combined offers from Sotheran's stock with a column penned by Stonehouse titled "Adventures in Bookselling" featuring romantic recollections from his career and observations on the book world. It continued until his death and then for two more issues, the first being a memorial issue with text by Stonehouse, and the second a simple price list issued in 1938 as No. 23. It was revived in 1989. In 1936, he was president of the Antiquarian Booksellers' Association.

=== Cosway bindings ===
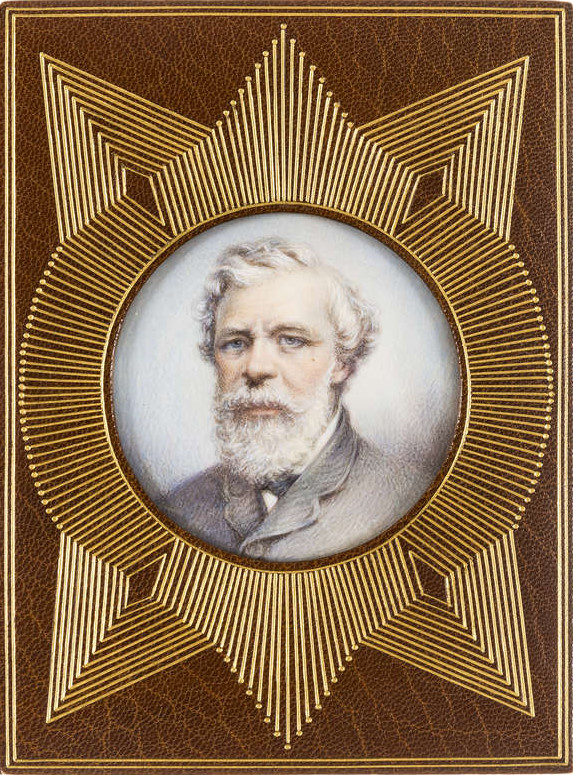
Cover of the works of Robert Browning in a Cosway binding No. 915 c.1930 with a miniature by C. B. Currie and signed by Currie and Stonehouse inside.

In 1901 or 1902, Stonehouse introduced what became known as the Cosway binding, a book in a fine binding, in which Sotheran's already specialised, but with the addition of a miniature portrait on the front cover relating to the author or subject of the book. The name came from the 18th-century miniaturist and macaroni Richard Cosway whose work had been the subject of several exhibitions in London in the 1890s.

The books were bound by the Rivière bindery, who already did a lot of work for Sotheran's, and the portraits painted by Miss C. B. Currie (Caroline Billin Curry, died 1940) in oil on ivory. They were protected by a thin glass cover. Currie produced several thousand miniatures during her career with Sotheran's, as well as at least 164 numbered fore-edge paintings for the firm, but her identity was kept secret until 1911 when the success of the books was so great that Stonehouse decided to use her as part of the firm's marketing. Similar bindings had been made in 18th-century France and 19th-century America, and a number of competitors copied Sotheran's success, but it was the Cosways from Sotheran's that popularised that style of binding.

=== The "Great Omar" ===
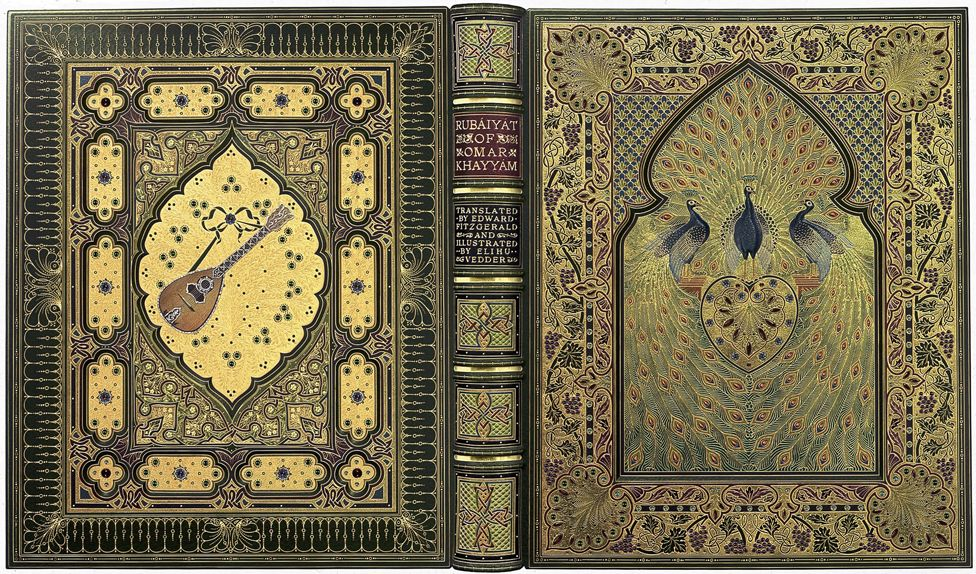
The Rubaiyat of Omar Khayyam (the "Great Omar") bound by Sangorski & Sutcliffe in 1909-11, and lost with the Titanic in 1912.

In 1909, Stonehouse commissioned the bookbinders Sangorski & Sutcliffe to produce an edition of Edward FitzGerald's The Rubaiyat of Omar Khayyam (1859), a translation of the poetry of Omar Khayyam. As Stonehouse later recalled, he told Francis Sangorski:

Do it and do it well; there is no limit, put what you like into the binding, charge what you like for it; the greater the price, the more I shall be pleased; provided only that it is understood, that what you do, and what you charge for, will be justified by the result; and the book when finished is to be the greatest modern Binding in the world; these are the only instructions.

The book, based on the large 1884 American edition illustrated by Elihu Vedder, took two years to complete at Sangorski & Sutcliffe's bindery in Southampton Row and included 1,050 jewels of topaz, turquoise, ruby, amethyst, garnets, and olivines. These were set in a binding of 5,000 pieces of coloured leather on a green morocco leather base. Stonehouse named the book the "Great Omar". According to company legend, he once played a prank on Sangorski by hiding the book when they met for dinner, causing Sangorski to think that he had lost it.

Despite the book not being finished, Stonehouse made it the centrepiece of Sotheran's shop display for the Coronation of George V and Mary in June 1911. It was priced at £1,000, more than three times the price of any other single volume offered by the firm at the time. He was confident it would sell as there was already strong demand for jewelled bindings, particularly in the United States, but despite wide publicity it failed to find a buyer. It was refused by the King's librarian at Windsor, who was repelled by it, and Gabriel Wells refused it at £900. In 1912, an attempt to send it to the United States for the viewing of wealthy book buyers there, failed due to customs problems. Finally, Cecil Sotheran, whom Stonehouse had not consulted before commissioning the book, ordered it to be sold without reserve at auction. It came up at Sotheby's in March 1912 and was sold to Gabriel Wells for £405. Wells sent it to New York on RMS Titanic but the book was lost when that ship sank in April 1912. Stonehouse published his history of the book in 1933.

The troubled history of the book and its loss on the Titanic has caused some to view it as "cursed". The front cover featured three peacocks, a bird traditionally associated with immortality but in the modern era also with pride and vanity, sins possibly reflected in the commissioning, pricing, and decorating of the book which featured 97 topazes on the cover with a border of 250 amethysts. The back cover showed an innocuous Persian mandolin, but inside the front doublure was a snake (or serpent) in an apple tree, evoking the story of the temptation of Eve by the serpent in the Garden of Eden which introduced evil into the world, while the back doublure showed a skull with teeth made of ivory. Among the flowers decorating the end pages were poppies and deadly nightshade, the whole creating a theme more of death than immortality. In 1912, Francis Sangorski drowned in an accident, while a later replica of the book created by Sangorski & Sutcliffe was destroyed during the London Blitz.

=== Charles Dickens ===
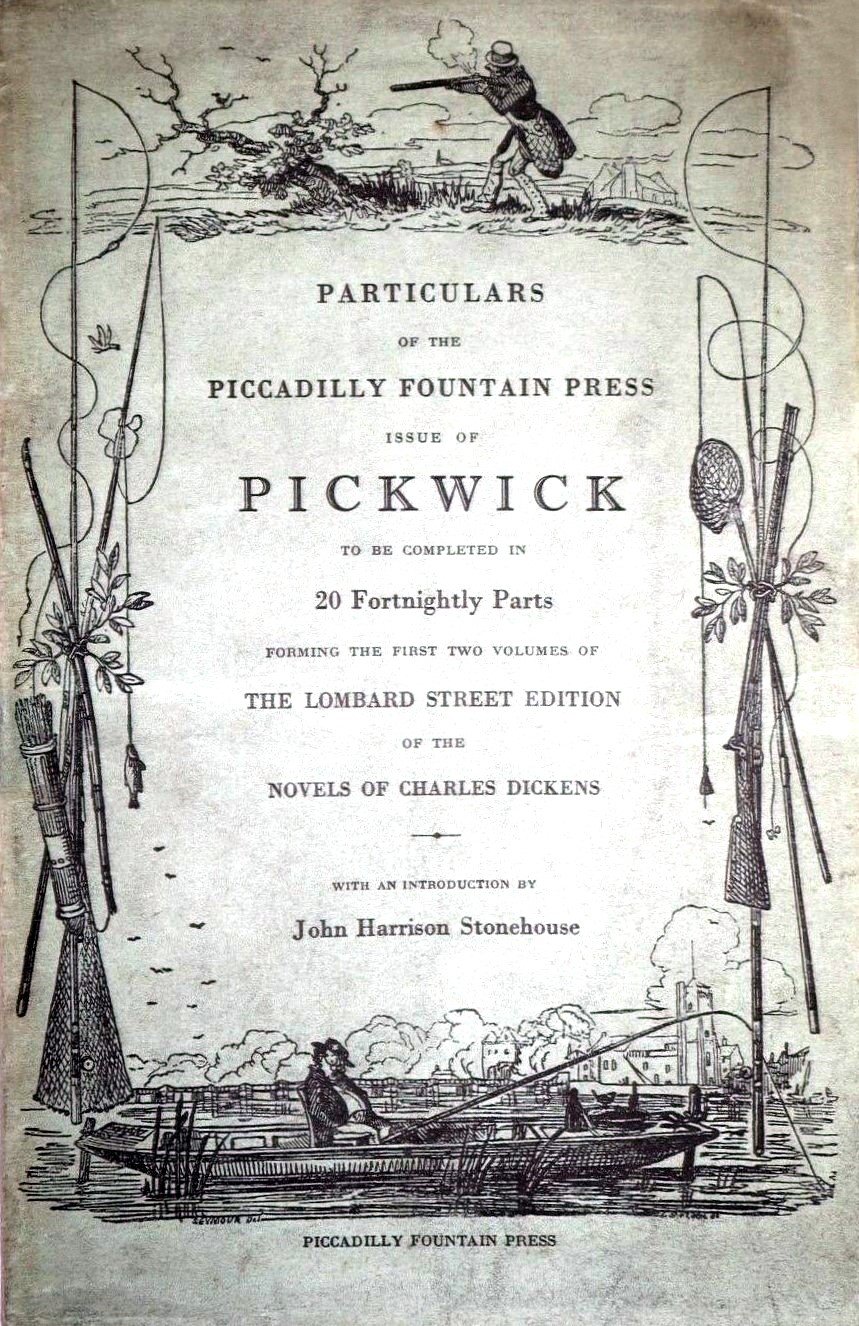
Cover of the sales brochure for the Piccadilly Fountain Press edition of The Posthumous Papers of the Pickwick Club, 1931.

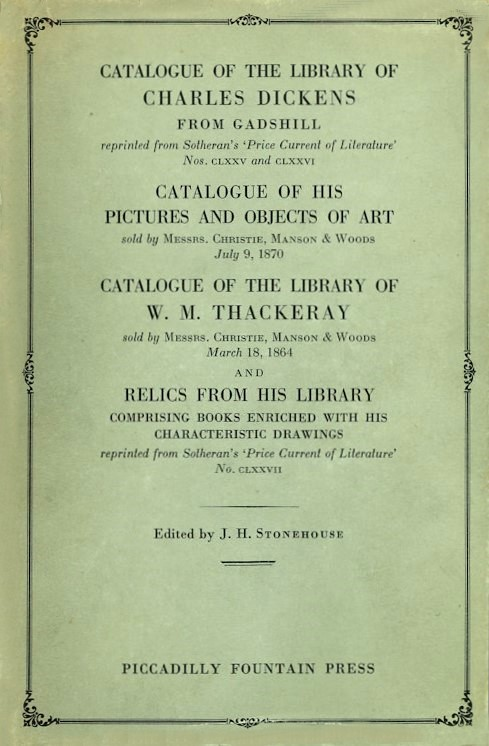
The catalogue of the libraries of Charles Dickens and William Thackeray edited by Stonehouse, 1935.

Stonehouse's personal literary interests centred on the works of Charles Dickens. In 1905, an employee of Sotheran's overheard a man in a hotel bar talking about documents that he thought were by Dickens and would be of great value if only they could be authenticated. Stonehouse became involved as the firm's specialist in manuscripts and found a poem titled "The Bill of Fare" and a number of letters of a romantic nature from Charles Dickens to Maria Beadnell (1811–86, later Mrs Maria Winter), who ultimately married a merchant with better prospects than the unestablished young Dickens. After a number of visits to the owner, a daughter of Maria Winter, Stonehouse managed to obtain 18 letters which he transcribed with notes sufficient to form the basis of a book that for the first time identified Beadnell as the model for Dora in Dickens's autobiographical novel David Copperfield and as Flora Finching in Little Dorrit.

Finding the letters to be unpublishable in England, in 1905, Stonehouse took them and his book manuscript to the United States, hoping to find a buyer. They were refused by John Pierpont Morgan but accepted by the industrialist and collector William K. Bixby of St Louis who also agreed to publish Stonehouse's book. It appeared in 1908 as Charles Dickens and Maria Beadnell: Private correspondence, published for the members of The Bibliophile Society of Boston, Massachusetts, with a preface by Henry H. Harper and edited by George Pierce Baker of Harvard University. Despite the book being substantially based on Stonehouse's work, his name did not appear anywhere, the only possible reference to him being in the preface as "one who realized their [the letters] worth".

In 1921, Stonehouse produced editions of Dickens's readings from David Copperfield and Oliver Twist based on the original printed editions, the former including his essay on the relationship between Dickens and Maria Beadnell. The readings from Oliver Twist, titled Sikes and Nancy, included Stonehouse's "A First Bibliography of the Reading Editions of Charles Dickens's Works". In 1930-31, he produced in five parts the biographical Green Leaves: New chapters in the life of Charles Dickens which dealt principally with Dickens's early life and its influence on his writings. It was issued in bound form in 1931. A revised and enlarged edition was published by Haskell House Publishers of New York in 1973. In 1931-32, he provided the introduction for and edited an edition in parts of The Posthumous Papers of the Pickwick Club (The Pickwick Papers). In 1935, he edited the catalogue of Dickens's library at Gadshill which was combined with the library of novelist William Thackeray in one volume drawn from Sotheran's price lists.

== Death and legacy ==
Stonehouse died on 27 August 1937. His address at the time of his death was 19 Grand Avenue, Muswell Hill, London. He was cremated at Golders Green Crematorium and received an obituary from Siegfried Sassoon in The Bookseller titled "Adventurer in Bookselling" that referenced Stonehouse's column "Adventures in Bookselling" in Piccadilly Notes. There was also an obituary in The Publishers' Circular and the Publisher & Bookseller titled "Death of a Noted Bookseller and Bibliophile".

Probate was granted to his widow Mary Martha Stonehouse on an estate of £604 but in November that year she wrote to Sotheran's asking for financial assistance as she had little money left and was unable to work. Her income then came from letting out rooms to lodgers. The firm gave her £20 and a pension of £1 per week.

In 2001, Stonehouse featured as a character in Craig O. Thompson's Omar: A novel, in which an attempt is made to recover the "Great Omar" from the wreck of the Titanic. In 2011, his activities at Sotheran's featured heavily in Victor Gray's history of that firm titled Bookmen London: 250 years of Sotheran bookselling, chapter 12 of which is titled "The reign of Stonehouse".

== Selected publications ==
- David Copperfield: A reading in five chapters by Charles Dickens; reprinted from the privately printed edition of 1866, with a note on the romantic history of Charles Dickens and Maria Beadnell by John Harrison Stonehouse. Henry Sotheran & Co, London, 1921.
- Sikes and Nancy: A reading by Charles Dickens; reprinted from the copy of the privately printed edition, formerly in the collection of Sir Henry Irving, with an introduction and a general bibliography of the reading editions by John Harrison Stonehouse &c.. Henry Sotheran & Co, London, 1921.
- Green Leaves: New chapters in the life of Charles Dickens. Piccadilly Fountain Press, London, five monthly parts 1930-31 and bound edition 1931. (Revised and enlarged edition, Haskell House Publishers, New York, 1973)
- The Posthumous Papers of the Pickwick Club &c. Piccadilly Fountain Press, London, 1931-32. (In 20 parts) (Editor and introduction)
- The Story of the Great "Omar", Bound by Francis Longinus Sangorski, and its Romantic Loss. Piccadilly Fountain Press, London, 1933.
- Catalogue of the library of Charles Dickens from Gadshill reprinted from Sotheran's 'Price Current of Literature' Nos. CLXXV and CLXXVI; Catalogue of his pictures and objects of art sold by Messrs. Christie, Manson & Woods, July 9, 1870; Catalogue of the library of W. M. Thackeray sold by Messrs. Christie, Manson & Woods, March 18, 1864 and relics from his library comprising books enriched with his characteristic drawings reprinted from Sotheran's 'Price Current of Literature' No. CLXXVII. Piccadilly Fountain Press, London, 1935. (Editor)
