= Max Harzof =

American bookseller

- Born: 1875; Vienna, Austria-Hungary
- Died: January 3, 1942 (aged 66–67); New York City, United States
- Occupation: Bookseller

Max Harzof (1875 – January 3, 1942) known just as Harzof, was an American bookseller who was the owner of the Lexington Bookshop in New York. During his career, he handled many rare books, including items from the library of Herman Melville.

== Early life ==
Harzof was born in Vienna, Austria-Hungary. According to David A. Randall, Harzof's father decided to emigrate to America after he and his family were pushed off the sidewalk and into the gutter by a group of soldiers. The family arrived in New York City in 1881. Harzof attended grade school in the city until he was twelve years old and then obtained a job as an office boy with the booksellers F.W. Christern & Co.

== Career ==
Harzof went into business for himself in 1905 with a shop in Lexington Avenue called the Lexington Bookshop. His firm was G.A. Baker and Company Inc. Over 30 years, he developed a reputation as an expert in book values and was sought by serious book collectors for his advice and assistance in building their collections. He would never allow his name to be mentioned in dedications, acknowledgements, or in any other way in books, even though he was instrumental in training book dealers, helping academics in their research, and aiding collectors in building their libraries. He had an additional business line of insurance and tax valuations.

He was honest in his dealings, generous, plain-speaking (sometimes crude), and "no respecter of persons". When asked by bookseller Gabriel Wells why he was selling Wells an Oscar Wilde manuscript for the price of $1,040, Harzof candidly admitted, "I wanted to make an even thousand-dollar profit". When one wealthy woman did not like his valuation of her worm-eaten books, she accused him of being a "mere junk dealer". Harzof replied, "That could be, but I have never heard it said that a bookworm made any distinction between a ten-thousand-dollar book and a ten-cent one". On another occasion, the writer Edward Larocque Tinker incurred the displeasure of Harzof and found his works included ever after in Harzof's catalogues under the rhyming insult STINKER.

Harzof thought honesty a rarer quality than intelligence. He lent his assistant William Hobart Royce to bookseller Wells. According to Harzof, Royce's "main virtue was that he could be implicitly trusted with bags of uncounted gold".

One beneficiary of Harzof's generosity was David A. Randall, who was allowed to work from Harzof's shop for three years from 1931 when he found himself unemployed due to the Depression. It was Harzof who was responsible for Randall meeting Josiah K. Lilly Jr., of the pharmaceutical Lilly family, when in 1932 Randall took a suitcase full of William D. Breaker's books to Lilly on behalf of Harzof. Lilly later donated his extensive collection to Indiana University to form the Lilly Library, on condition that Randall went along with it.

== Herman Melville ==
When Moby-Dick author Herman Melville died in 1891, his widow sold the remains of his library to a book dealer in Brooklyn for $110 after a New York dealer offered only $100. Items from that sale were still turning up on both sides of the Hudson River in the 1930s. One was Melville's personal annotated copy of Thomas Beale's The Natural History of the Sperm Whale (London, 1839), which was found in a collection of miscellaneous maritime books brought into Harzof's shop.

In 1932, Harzof found Melville's personal copy of Owen Chase's Narrative of the Most Extraordinary and Distressing Shipwreck of the Whale-Ship Essex, of Nantucket; Which was Attacked and finally Destroyed by a large Spermaceti-Whale, in the Pacific Ocean (New York, 1821), which included eighteen pages of notes in Melville's writing in which he said that "the reading of his wondrous story upon the landless sea ... had a surprising effect upon me".

== Death ==
Harzof died 3 January 1942 at the age of 67. He was survived by his wife, Mildred. His business was bought by his former employees John S. Kebabian and Bernard G. Otto.

== Sources ==
- Cerf, Bennett (1944). Try and Stop Me: A Collection of Anecdotes and Stories, Mostly Humorous. Simon and Schuster. "Max Harzof."
- Clark, Thomas D. (1977). Indiana University: Midwestern Pioneer Vol. V. Ontario: Fitzhenry & Whiteside. ISBN 0-253-37501-0.
- Dickinson, Donald C. (1998). Dictionary of American Antiquarian Bookdealers. Westport: Greenwood Press. ISBN 978-0-313-26675-1.
- "Max Harzof". Publishers Weekly. 141. R. R. Bowker Company. 1942.
- Randall, David A. (1969). Dukedom Large Enough. New York: Random House. ISBN 978-1-399-89151-6. "Max Harzof."
- Muir, Percy Horace (1956). Minding My Own Business: An Autobiography. Chatto & Windus. "Max Harzof."
