= Barton Currie =

Barton Wood Currie
- Born: Barton Wood Currie; March 8, 1877; New York City, US
- Died: May 7, 1962 (aged 85); Philadelphia, Pennsylvania, US
- Education: Harvard University
- Occupations: Journalist, editor, book collector
- Spouse: Florence

Barton Wood Currie (March 8, 1877 – May 7, 1962) was an American journalist, author, and book collector. Writer of hundreds of articles and stories for publications such as New York Evening World, New York Evening Sun, Harper's Weekly and Good Housekeeping in the early part of the 20th century, Currie went on to become the editor of The Country Gentleman, Ladies Home Journal, and World's Work. He also authored several books. Currie acquired an important collection of material related to Joseph Conrad when that author was out of favor in the 1920s.

== Early life and education ==
Currie was born in New York City. He graduated from Harvard University in 1899.

== Writing career ==
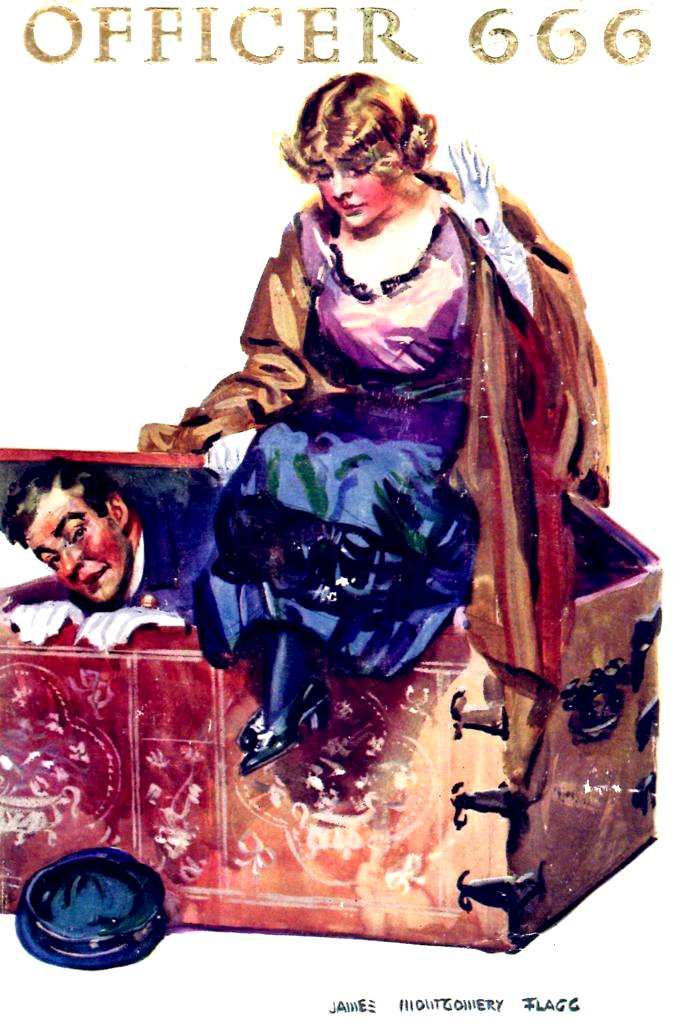
Cover of Officer 666, illustrated by James Montgomery Flagg

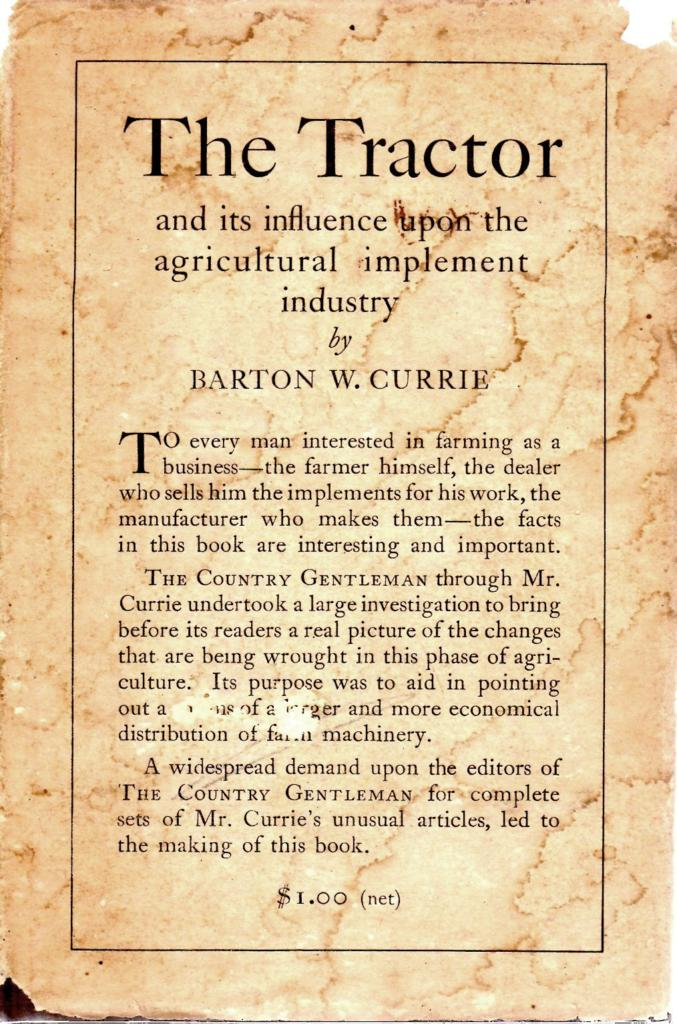
Cover of The Tractor and Its Influence Upon the Agricultural Implement Industry, 1916

Currie began his writing career in about 1905 at Joseph Pulitzer's New York Evening World, where he worked under Charles Chapin, the "Rose Man of Sing Sing" who shot and killed his wife. According to James Morris, "At the heart of Chapin's news-gathering operation remained his prize rewrite team. Barton Currie was his star". Albert Payson Terhune said, "He could take a bare handful of semi-statistical notes and turn them, on demand, either into a tensely dramatic or roaringly funny column story". One of his most memorable assignments for the New York Evening World was a report on the landing of Admiral Robert Peary in Labrador upon his historic return from the North Pole in 1909.

Currie was a staff reporter for the New York Evening Sun and The New York Times, and also wrote for Harper's Weekly and Good Housekeeping (1909–1911). In all, he wrote hundreds of articles and stories.

From 1912 to 1917 he was the associate editor of The Country Gentleman, and worked as editor of that publication from 1917 to 1920. From 1920 to 1928 he was the editor of Ladies Home Journal. At both journals, he solicited Zane Grey to write articles and serialized novels, but their eight-year relationship soured when Currie began to criticize the quality of Grey's work. In 1928 Currie joined Doubleday Doran as editor of World's Work.

An example of Currie's versatility is Officer 666, a comic novel written with Augustin MacHugh (1912). Officer 666 was adapted as a stage play on Broadway, produced by George M. Cohan and Sam Harris, which toured the United States in 1912. It was made into the silent film Officer 666 in Australia in 1916, and was also filmed in 1914 and 1920. Currie also wrote The Tractor and Its Influence Upon the Agricultural Implement Industry (1916), reprinting his articles on tractors from his stint on Country Gentlemen.

== Collecting ==
Currie wrote from personal experience of the effect of bibliomania on the collector in his memoir Fishers of Books (1931):

The first symptom of bibliomania ... manifests itself by producing a form of somnambulism. You come out of a bookshop carrying a first edition of something or other. You cannot explain how or why you got it, or what you paid for it. But you have it; and when you arrive home with it you creep off to some secluded room and examine it. Then occurs the first little burning exaltation. Just a little glow to begin with, then by infinite gradations a consuming fire.

Other topics in the book included the pros and cons of different methods of collecting, the techniques of various dealers, fellow collectors, highlights from his collection and the effect of the Wall Street crash on the values of collectible books. In 1935 he defined an antiquarian book-seller as someone "who can charge $1,000 for a ten-dollar item and make you feel that he has done you a favor".

Currie assembled an important collection of material relating to the novelist Joseph Conrad, including a number of manuscripts that he acquired from Dr. Rosenbach, who had obtained them at the John Quinn sale of 1924. After Currie's death in 1962, much of the Conrad material was sold at auction at the Parke-Bernet Galleries on 7 and 8 May 1963.

Sometime around 1931, Currie acquired, via Gabriel Wells, the original manuscript for Richard Brinsley Sheridan's The School for Scandal. It was purchased for less than the $75,000 reported in the press at the time. It was then acquired by Robert H. Taylor and ultimately by Princeton University, who received Taylor's collection.

== Death ==
Currie died on 7 May 1962 in Philadelphia and was buried at Evergreen Cemetery, Hillside, Union County, New Jersey.

== Papers ==
A collection of Currie's papers is held at the Princeton University Library.

== Selected publications ==
- Officer 666. H.K. Fly Company, New York, 1912. (With Augustin MacHugh)
- The Tractor and Its Influence Upon the Agricultural Implement Industry. Curtis Publishing Co., Philadelphia, 1916.
- Fishers of Books. Little, Brown, and Company, Boston, 1931.
- Booth Tarkington: A Bibliography. Doubleday, Doran & Co., Garden City, New York, 1932.
