= Robert H. Taylor =

Robert H. Taylor (died, aged 76, on 5 May 1985) was a bibliophile who was president of the Grolier Club, the Keats-Shelley Association of America and the Bibliographical Society of America (1970–1971).

He donated his collection of 7,000 books, manuscripts and drawings to Princeton University in 1971. He had graduated from Princeton in 1930.

Grandson of businessman and politician John Emory Andrus, Taylor served as director of the Surdna Foundation, a philanthropy established by Andrus in 1917.

== Collecting ==
Taylor's collection was noted for its works by Anthony Trollope and Richard Brinsley Sheridan. One important item owned by Taylor was the original manuscript for Sheridan's The School for Scandal which he acquired via Barton Currie. The collection also includes a number of original manuscripts of John Locke. One of his notable works was translating the Burmese writer, Thein Pe Myint's Wartime Traveller into English.

In 1981 he was awarded the Sir Thomas More Medal for Book Collecting by the University of San Francisco Gleeson Library and the Gleeson Library Associates.
