= Sotheran's =

Bookshop in London, England

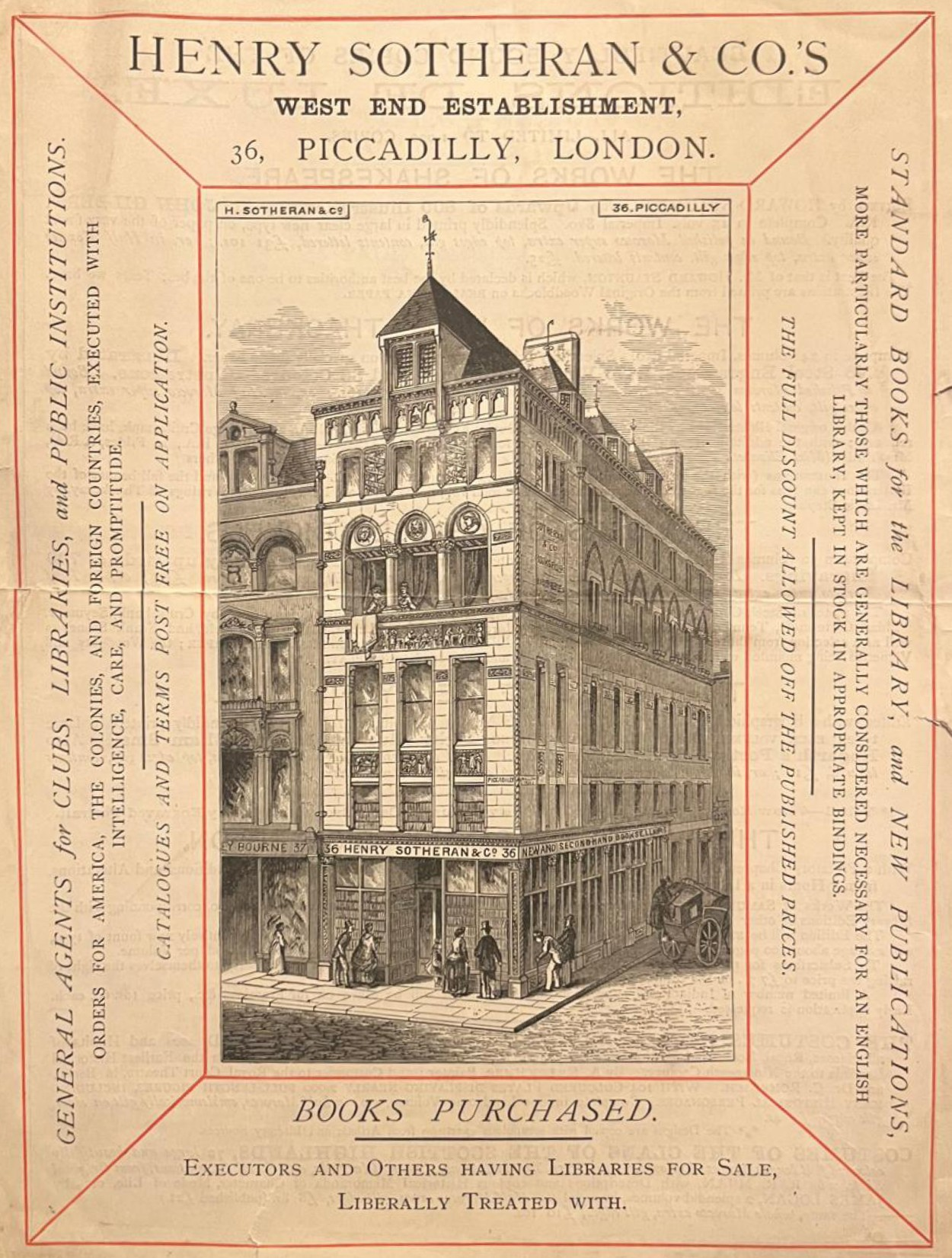
- The premises of Henry Sotheran Ltd at 36 Piccadilly, opened in 1872
- Industry: Retail
- Founded: 1761; 265 years ago
- Founder: Henry Sotheran
- Headquarters: 22 Charing Cross Road; Westminster, London, WC2H 0HS; United Kingdom, UK
- Number of locations: 2 (2026)
- Products: Rare books and manuscripts
- Website: Official website

Henry Sotheran Ltd, popularly referred to as Sotheran's, is a bookshop in London, England, claiming to be the oldest continuously operating bookshop in the United Kingdom and the oldest antiquarian bookshop in Europe.

== History ==
Founded in 1761 in York by Henry Sotheran, the company established a presence in London in 1815. Over the decades, Sotheran's acquired and sold several notable libraries, including that of Laurence Sterne in 1768 and Charles Dickens in 1870. In 1892, it managed to secure Althorp's complete library, including many incunabula and a very rare collection of Caxtons, for £210,000 (equivalent to almost £33.5 million in 2024); the collection was sold to Enriqueta Augustina Rylands, who erected in Manchester a permanent memorial to her husband in the John Rylands Library. (From 1881 to 1893 the firm had a branch in Manchester.) In 1896, Sotheran's sold to J. P. Morgan a Gutenberg Bible on vellum, for £2,750, and an even more expensive collection of Byron manuscripts; the following year, it secured the Warwick Castle Shakespeare Library for Henry Clay Folger.

Following the death of Henry 'Cecil' Sotheran (1861–1928), the last member of the Sotheran family to run the firm, Sotheran's was purchased by the bookseller Gabriel Wells. Among the investors was the banker and collector Anthony de Rothschild, a connection that ultimately led to the Rothschild banking firm acquiring the company outright in 1957. Sotheran's has since remained independently owned.

== Luxury bindings ==
English bookseller and Dickens scholar John Harrison Stonehouse joined the firm as an apprentice in 1884, ultimately becoming managing director through his skills of literacy, invention, and marketing. Under his direction, Sotheran's ordered several significant bindings and fore-edge paintings from renowned binders, including finely painted 'Cosway' bindings. In 1909, Stonehouse commissioned the bookbinders Sangorski & Sutcliffe to produce the famous jewelled copy of Edward FitzGerald's The Rubaiyat of Omar Khayyam, lost with the Titanic in 1912. The work took nearly two years to finish and included 1,050 jewels. It was described by James Sprague as 'relatively the most expensive book binding ever done in the 20th century'.

== Warrants ==
In 1901, Sotheran's was granted the Royal warrant of appointment as booksellers and bookbinders to King Edward VII, renewed by George V in 1910. The company had been supplying books and bindings to Edward while he was still Prince of Wales, as early as 1881.

== Premises ==
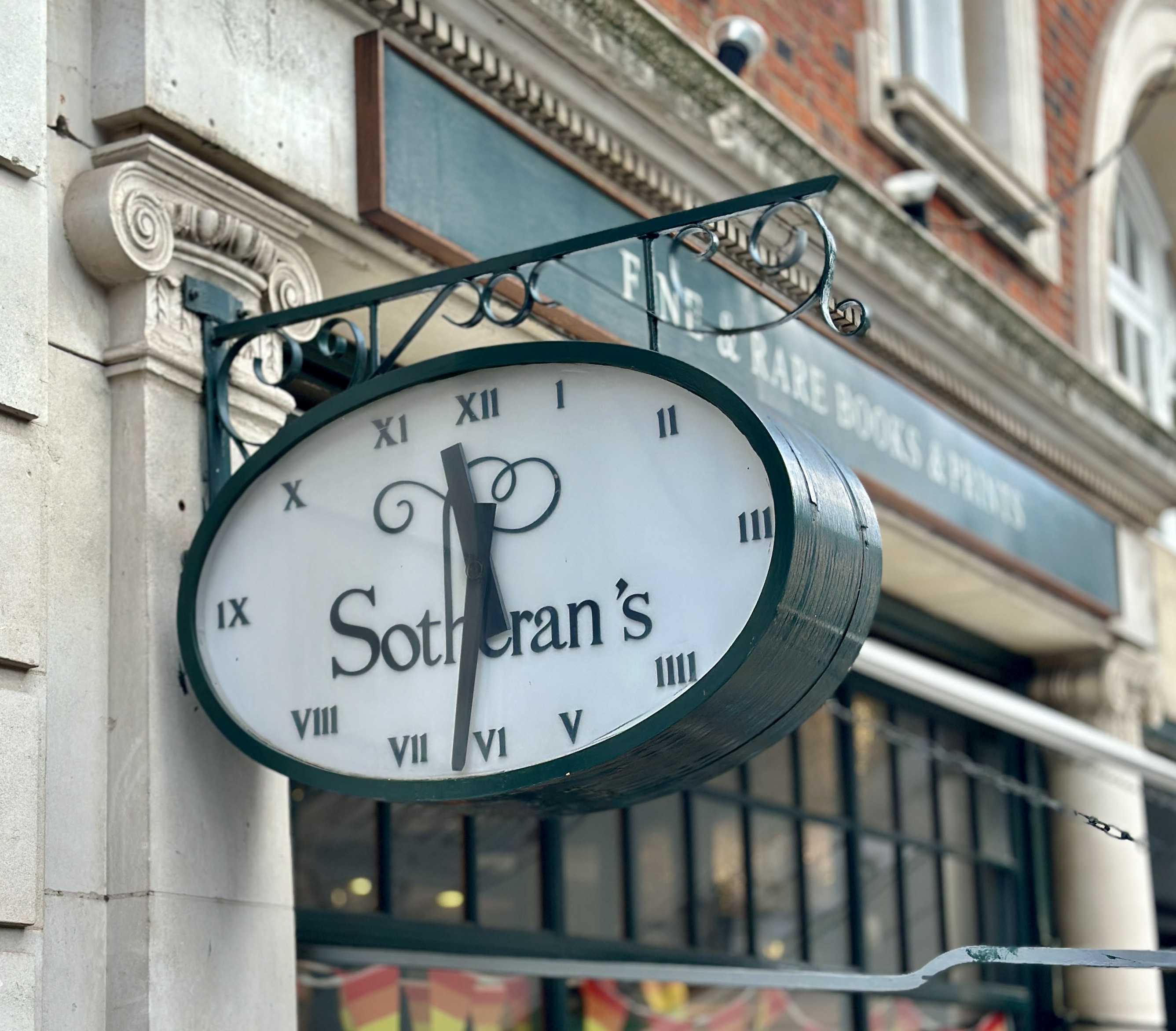
The clock at 2–5 Sackville Street

The company is located at 22 Charing Cross Road and 8 Cecil Court in central London.

In 1872, the firm, then partnered with J. Baer, opened its purpose-built premises at 36 Piccadilly, London. The building was designed by the architectural practice George & Vaughan, comprising Sir Ernest George and Thomas Vaughan. From 1936 to 2024, it was based at 2–5 Sackville Street, London.

== See also ==
- Book trade in the United Kingdom
- Books in the United Kingdom
