= David A. Randall =

American book dealer and librarian

David A. Randall inspecting the Poole Collection in the Lilly Library

David Anton Randall (5 April 1905 – 25 May 1975) was an American book dealer, librarian and bibliographic scholar. He was head of Scribner's rare book department from 1935 to 1956, librarian of the Lilly Library and Professor of Bibliography at Indiana University. Randall was responsible for the sale of two copies of the Gutenberg Bible. As a practitioner of bibliology with a bibliophiliac addiction, a raconteur of history of books, and an avid collector, he developed a keen appreciation for books as physical objects—including the tasks of collecting, cataloging, finding and preserving them.

== Early life ==
Randall was born in Nanticoke, Pennsylvania and educated at Harrisburg Academy (graduated 1924) then Lehigh University from which he graduated with a B.A. degree in English in 1928. He began to study law at Harvard but dropped out after one term after attending George Parker Winship's course on the history of the book. He got a job working for E. Byrne Hackett in New York for whom he attended the Jerome Kern auction. In 1931 the depression found him unemployed and he took up independent book scouting to support himself. He had doubts about the decision, his wife was pregnant and "the only thing to do, it seemed, was to return to the Pennsylvania coal mines." Mrs Randall, however, thought otherwise, saying that he was hard enough to live with as it was and he would be "completely intolerable" if he wasn't doing a job he liked. He formed a relationship with Max Harzof through whom Randall met important figures in the book world. Randall also prepared catalogs based on Harzof's stock.

== Scribner's ==
In 1935 Randall was appointed to head Scribner's rare book department, a position he held until 1956. In that capacity he got to know leading dealers and collectors of the day including Estelle Doheny, Carl H. Pforzheimer, Carroll A. Wilson, and Thomas W. Streeter. Through his friendship with John Carter in Scribner's London office, Randall was able to acquire many important British and European books, including the re-discovered Schuckburgh copy of the Gutenberg Bible. Together, Randall and Carter published catalogues that developed new markets and appealed to a younger generation of collectors. Subject included modern first editions, mysteries, musical firsts and familiar quotations.

== Indiana University ==
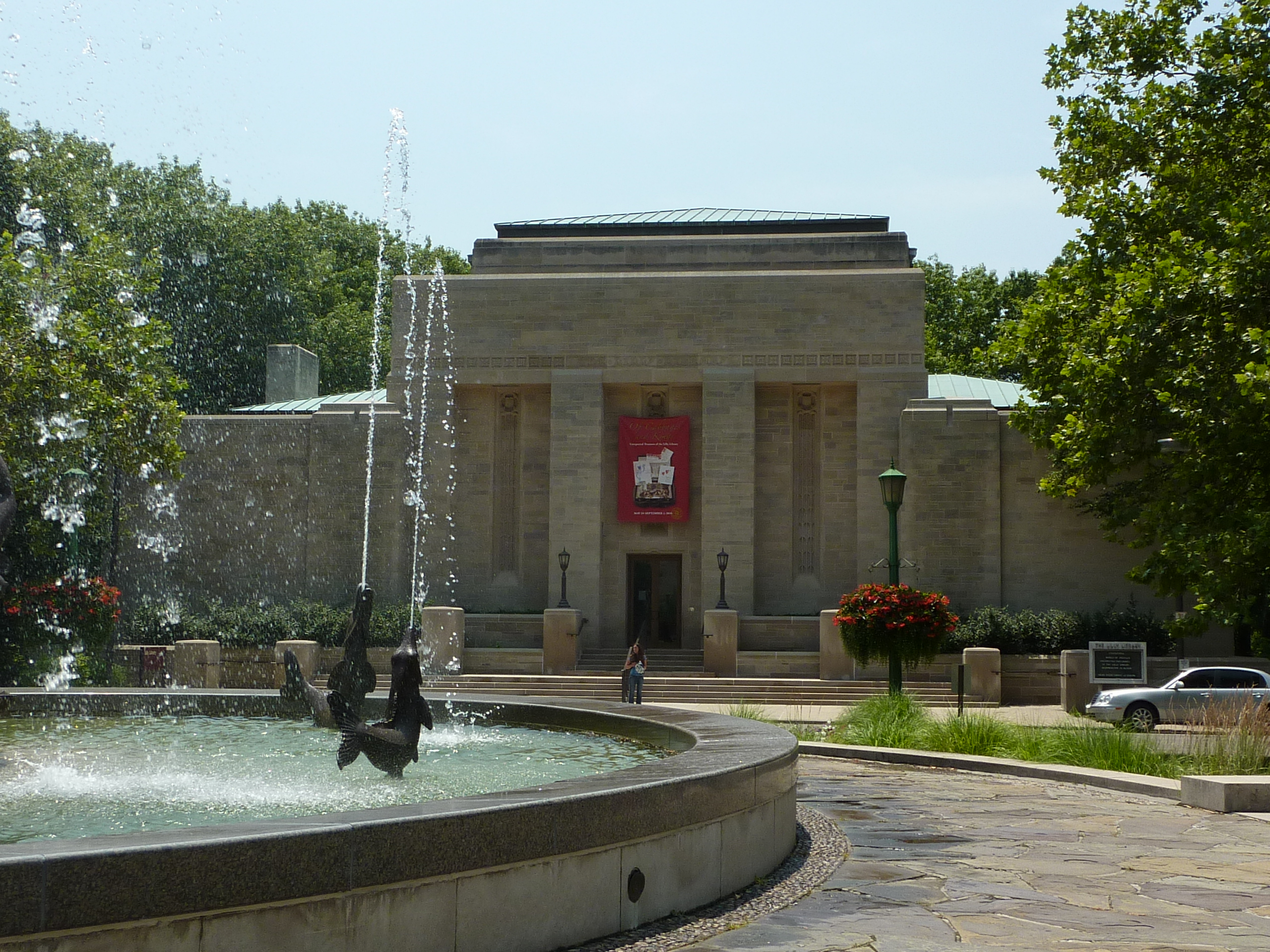
The Lilly Library

One of the collectors Randall met through Herzof was Josiah K. Lilly Jr. of the pharmaceutical Lillys. When Lilly decided to give his collection to Indiana University in 1955, where they formed the basis of the Lilly Library, Randall was asked to take up the post of Lilly Librarian which he did on 1 July 1956. He also received the title of Professor of Bibliography. Among the collections that Randall acquired for Indiana were the Bobbs-Merrill archive, the Bernardo Mendel Latin American library, the Upton Sinclair papers, the George A. Poole early printing collection, the Wendell Willkie papers, and Ian Fleming's collection of nineteenth century science and thought and his James Bond novel typescripts.

== Writing ==
Randall was a prolific contributor to bibliographic journals, including Publishers Weekly, The Colophon, Papers of the Bibliographical Society of America, and Bibliographical Notes and Queries (for which he was the American editor). In book form, Randall tended to work with others, contributing chapters or editing. Important works included his essay "American First Editions 1900-1933" in John Carter's New Paths in Book Collecting (1934) and a revision of A Primer of Book Collecting with John T. Winterich in 1946. He was a member of the committee charged with preparing the Bibliography of American Literature.

His reminiscences for the years 1929–1956, Dukedom Large Enough, were published by Random House in 1969.

== Memberships ==
Randall was a member of the Bibliographical Society of America, the Grolier and University Clubs of New York and the Caxton Club of Chicago.

== Honors ==
In 1966 Lehigh University awarded Randall an honorary Doctor of Letters degree. He also received the "Leather Medal" from Sigma Delta Chi.

A thousand items of Randall's drafts, correspondence and personal memorabilia are in the collection of the Lilly Library at Indiana University.

Donald Dickinson, author of the Dictionary of American Antiquarian Bookdealers, opined that Randall was a knowing and resourceful bookman and antiquarian, who cultivated relations with a broad range of collectors, dealers and bibliographers. Randall effectively parlayed his knowledge and extensive contacts in bookstores, the industry and libraries to further the cause.

== Selected publications ==
- A Primer of Book Collecting. New revised and enlarged edition. New York, Greenberg, 1946. (With John T. Winterich)
- Wilson, Carroll A. Thirteen Author Collections of the Nineteenth Century, and Five Centuries of Familiar Quotations. Scribner, New York, 1950. (Editor with Jean C.S. Wilson)
- The J.K. Lilly Collection of Edgar Allan Poe: An account of its Formation. Bloomington, Lilly Library, Indiana University, 1964.
- Three Centuries of American poetry: An Exhibition of Original Printings the Lilly Library, Indiana University.. Bloomington, Lilly Library, Indiana University, 1965.
- Dukedom Large Enough. Random House, New York, 1969.
- Science Fiction and Fantasy: An Exhibition, January–April 1975. Bloomington, Lilly Library, Indiana University, 1975.
