= Helen Haywood =

English artist & writer (1907–1995)

Helen Riviere Haywood (28 December 1907 – 1995) was an English artist and writer, known for her illustrations of children's books and her fore-edge and binding paintings. She was the daughter of Mabel Riviere Calklin (b.1875) and her father was Arthur Haywood. She was the great-granddaughter of the noted British binder, Robert Riviere (d.1882).

== Early life ==
Haywood was born in England in 1907, but was taken as a child to Chile, where her father, an engineer, worked on the trans-Andean railway. She remained in Chile until she was approximately 15 years old. Her experiences were recounted in an unpublished novel, Childhood in Chile.

== Career ==
Her books were published by Thomas Nelson Ltd through the 1950s and 1960s. She created a series of books based around the character Peter Tiggywig and friends.

Other work includes Master Mouse the Madcap (1958), and Animal Playtime and Animal Worktime which appeared in the Look with Mother series, and a paperback series for children published by Nelson including 'Aesop's Fables'(1965) 'Brer Rabbit' and the 'Water Babies' (abridged)

Miss Haywood was a keen student of science and an amateur naturalist and anthropologist. Many of the books she illustrated for the publisher Hutchinson & Co., London, were keenly observed and scrupulously accurate depictions of plants, birds and animals. When commissioned to do illustrations for a children's book on dinosaurs, her research into the skin colors she subsequently chose for her dinosaur illustrations was cited by the Royal Academy of Sciences.

Haywood was also an important practitioner of fore-edge painting, where a watercolor painting is applied to the fanned edge of an older book and binding paintings. She became acquainted with the art forms through an uncle who was associated with the Bayntun-Riviere Bindery of Bath. She did several fore-edge and double fore-edge paintings on commission every year from the 1930s to the 1940s for often for Inman's Books, an antiquarian book dealer in New York City. She probably stopped painting for-edge paintings in the late 1940s, putting the majority of her art work in her publishing of illustrated children's books.

She died in Bournemouth, England in 1995.

== Selected works ==
=== Illustrated by Helen Haywood ===
==== Written by Isobel St Vincent ====
- Wanda the Panda (1939) OCLC 179178742, 314735807
- Woodland Verse (1940) OCLC 78401748, 504479890, 774488312
- Figgles Frog Sees Life (1940) OCLC 179178649
- Sandy's Seven Tails (1943) OCLC 811586967, 558854281
- All A-Growing: the adventures of two young gardeners (1943) OCLC 30375749, 504479463
- The Helen Haywood Colour Book (1944) OCLC 179178660
- British Butterflies and Moths (1952) OCLC 30203867, 877567361

==== Written by Geoffrey Ford ====
- Hedgehog's Holiday (1938) OCLC 776769492, 14126577, 314578086

==== Written by others ====
- Ducks, geese, and swans, by Oscar J. Merne (1974) OCLC 733567061, 432634124, 1033596159, 1082445432, 1009091, 938803543, 1230125
- The Tortoise and the Ducks and other Aesop Fables (1963)

=== Written and illustrated by Helen Haywood ===
- The mouse that ran (1926) OCLC 227910096, 792830589, 558853038, 752655054, 67799620
- The Happy Tree (1951) OCLC 558853006
- Peter Tiggywig Grows Up (1955) OCLC 314690637, 30180604, 810809243, 558854096
- Peter Tiggywig Goes Camping (1955) OCLC 877177468, 751710900, 558854086, 1082938700, 234185304
- Peter Tiggywig Runs Away (1956) OCLC 810809241, 30167542, 558854113
- Peter Tiggywig's Wonderful Train (1957) OCLC 846557796
- Peter Tiggywig At School (1958) OCLC 877177467, 30252184, 810809247, 558854030
- Peter Tiggywig At The Fair (1958) OCLC 314690621, 30237171, 558854055, 1064121502, 810809256, 234185302
- Peter Tiggywig's Toy-shop (1958) OCLC 810809252, 558854154, 234185308, 751710920
- Peter Tiggywig At Sea (1959) OCLC 314690615, 30221571, 558854044, 810809251
- Peter Tiggywig At The Picnic (1960, 1961) OCLC 1083006780, 558854070, 810809261, 57413222*Peter Tiggywig's Birthday Party (1961) OCLC 558854130, 234185306
- The New Noah's Ark of Rare Animals (1964) OCLC 558854008, 751710885, 951080859, 3795520
- The days of the dinosaurs (1964, 1965) OCLC 30296884, 314690581, 156753024
