= Gabriel Wells =

American Bookseller

- Born: Gabor Weiss; January 24, 1861; Hungary
- Died: November 6, 1946 (aged 85)
- Occupation: Antiquarian bookseller

Gabriel Wells (January 24, 1861 – November 6, 1946) was a bookseller, historian and author. He was one of the most important antiquarian booksellers in America and Britain in the first half of the twentieth century. He was president of the Antiquarian Booksellers' Association in 1930.

His most significant cultural contribution today is probably breaking up an original copy of the Gutenberg Bible into individual leaves, marketed and sold as “Noble Fragments”.

== Early life ==
He was born Gabor Weiss to a Hungarian Jewish family in Balassa-Gyarmath, Hungary; his father was Moritz Weiss and he was one of six children. Gabriel changed his surname to Wells after emigrating to the United States in 1894, settling in Boston. He tutored in psychology and German language under William James, professor of psychology at Harvard, for three years, and also lectured on philosophy at conferences in New York and Massachusetts around the turn of the century. He was fluent in eight languages.

== Career ==
Wells established his bookselling business in New York City. His first transaction set the stage for his lifetime modus operandi: He bought up copies of the ten-volume subscription edition of John L. Stoddard's Lectures at book auctions, rebound them, and sold them to regular book dealers who would not otherwise have access to subscription sets. He did the same with limited editions.

Like his competitor, Dr. Rosenbach, Wells was active in the inter-war years in London and Europe buying up expensive books that could be sold to wealthy clients in the United States. In 1930, after the death of Henry Cecil Sotheran, Wells' purchases of books from Sotheran's during the Depression years effectively kept the business alive. Henry Sotheran Ltd, the longest-established antiquarian bookseller in Europe, was founded in York in 1761, established in London in 1815, and remains independently owned to the present day.

Wells was involved in a long-running rivalry with Rosenbach, who tended to get the limelight for buying the most expensive item at an auction, which he then sold on direct to the public. Wells spent more overall, but invested in less high-profile books that he often passed on through the trade. Unlike most booksellers, he never published a catalog of his offerings.

== Items handled ==
In 1912, Wells bought at auction a fabulous jewelled edition of the Rubaiyat of Omar Khayyam for £405. Known as "The Great Omar", it had been estimated at £1,000. The book itself was undistinguished but John Harrison Stonehouse of Henry Sotheran Ltd had commissioned Sangorski to provide the most luxurious binding possible. The work took nearly two years to finish and included 1,050 jewels. It was described by James Sprague as "relatively the most expensive book binding ever done in the 20th century." Wells gave it to a passenger on the RMS Titanic to transport to the United States, and the book was lost when the ship sank.

In 1922 Wells paid $200,000 for the right to print a limited run (1,024 copies) of the definitive edition of Mark Twain's writings. The edition includes the authenticated autographs of the author and of Albert Bigelow Paine on the flyleafs. The Gabriel Wells Definitive Edition, in 35 volumes, was published in 1922–1923. Another notable work that Wells handled was the original manuscript for Richard Brinsley Sheridan's The School for Scandal. It was eventually sold to the Philadelphia journalist and collector Barton Currie, before 1931, but for less than the $75,000 reported in the press at the time.

One of the most significant transactions of Wells' career was his purchase of a Gutenberg Bible from Joseph Sabin, who had bought it at auction in 1920. The two-volume work (one of 41 in existence) was not in perfect condition – it was missing 50 of its 643 leaves and some of those that remained had their illuminations cut out. Wells opted to break up the Bible and sell the leaves individually, thus reaching a wider market. The leaves in perfect or good condition sold for an average of $150 each (approximately $1,500 today), while the ruined leaves were priced around $100. Each leaf was elegantly slip-cased in a "black or dark blue morocco goatskin portfolio folder" with the words "A Leaf of the Gutenberg Bible (1450–1455)" embossed on the cover in gilt lettering. Wells commissioned A. Edward Newton to write a five-page essay, "A Noble Fragment, Being a Leaf of the Gutenberg Bible (1450–1455)", which was included with each sale. Wells' decision to sell the leaves individually allowed major institutions and universities to purchase pages that they were missing from their own editions of the Gutenberg Bible. Wells gifted the New York Public Library with all but one of the leaves that it was missing from its collection.

In 1939, Wells was embroiled in legal action after John Hayward discovered that Lord Victor Rothschild's first edition of Henry Fielding's Tom Jones was not authentic. Some of the pages were from another edition. Rothschild had paid £3,500 for the book including another work. The matter was settled out of court after a whole chain of dealers were shown not to have noticed the error, including Dr. Rosenbach.

In addition to book dealing, Wells authored many pamphlets on the social and economic issues of his day.

== Death ==
Wells never married. In his will, he left his estate to his siblings and their children, as well as to the Library of Congress, New York Public Library, Harvard, Rutgers University, and his native Hungarian town.

== Selected bibliography ==
=== Essays ===
- Appeal to Common Sense. Methuen. 1937.
- Gentle Reactions. Doubleday. 1923.

=== Speeches ===
- Edgar Allan Poe as a Mystic: Address Made at the Celebration of the 125th Anniversary of Edgar Allan Poe's Birthday Held in Philadelphia, January 19th, 1934. American Book Collector. 1934.
- What Is Wrong with the Human World: An Address Made Before the Elizabethan Club at Yale University, January 23, 1940. Literary Licensing, LLC. 2013. ISBN 978-1258676476.
- Wells, Gabriel (1936). Can Peace Be Maintained in Europe? (An Address Delivered Before the Quiz Medical Society at the University Club, New York).

=== Pamphlets ===
- Wells, Gabriel (1924). A Layman's Peace Plan.
- Are We a Democracy?. Doubleday. 1927.
- On Capital Punishment. W. Heinemann Limited. 1929.
- The Menace of Divorce. Literary Licensing, LLC. 2013. ISBN 978-1258676421.
- The Great English Strike: Its Three Lessons. Doubleday. 1926.
- Arbitration. Country Life Press. 1925.
- If I Were France. Doubleday. 1926.
- The Correlation of Capital and Labor. Doubleday. 1926.

== Sources ==
- Randall, David A. (1969). Dukedom Large Enough. New York: Random House. "Max Harzof."
