= Fore-edge painting =

Art on the edge of book pages

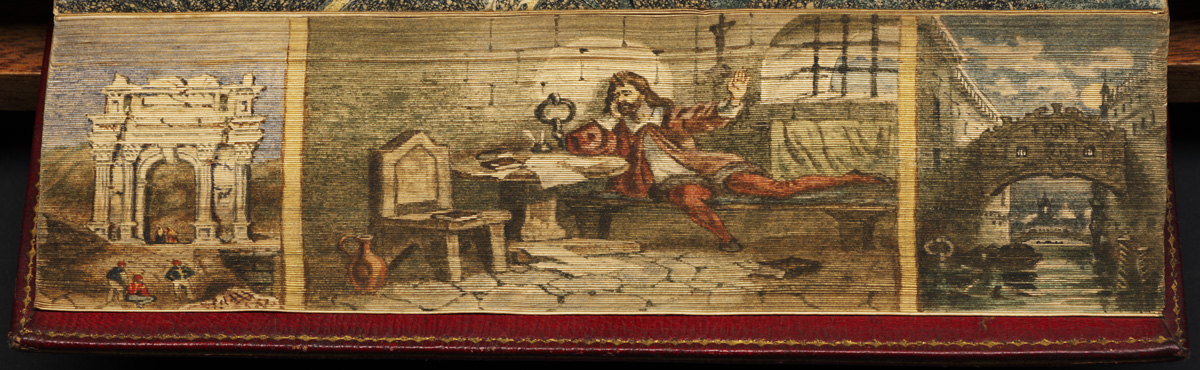
Jerusalem Delivered, a Heroic Poem, translated from the Italian of Torquato Tasso, by John Hoole. London 1797; with fore-edge painting: Trajan's Arch, (Ancona), Tasso in Prison, and the Bridge of Sighs

A fore-edge painting is an image painted on the unbound edges of a book visible when the pages of the book are fanned. It also can refer to an image that is visible on the closed edge of a book. References also refer to the paintings as disappearing or secret images, and they are often hidden beneath gilded edges.

Historically, fore-edge painting has had three purposes: identification, indication of ownership, or artistry. Possibly originating in the 10th century, the earliest known examples feature titles written on the closed edges of a book, symbolic imagery, or heraldic designs. The exact origins are debated among scholars. The technique of the hidden painting gained notable popularity in England during the 17th and 18th centuries. A fore-edge painting does not need to be painted on a book at the time of the book's creation. Unless a fore-edge artist was working with a bookseller or bookbinder, fore-edge paintings are applied sometime after the book has been published making the dating of the works difficult to ascertain unless the work is signed and dated.

Fore-edge painting is practiced today, however, it is still an uncommon art.

== Structure ==
=== Elements of the book ===
Common elements of the book

1. Belly band
2. Flap
3. Endpaper
4. Book cover
5. Head
6. Fore-edge
7. Tail
8. Right page, recto
9. Left page, verso
10. Gutter

The pages in a book are known as the "text block." Individual sections of the text block that are separately sewn in to create the text block were first known as gatherings or quires and later known as "signatures."

This article discusses paintings and markings located on the fore-edge (6), however, in some instances like a panoramic fore-edge painting, the art can extend to the Head (5) and the Tail (7).

=== Variations ===
- A single fore-edge painting includes a painting on only one side of the book page edges. Generally, gilt or marbling is applied after the painting has dried to hide the painting until the pages are fanned.
- A double fore-edge painting has paintings on either side of the margin so one painting is visible when the text block is fanned one way, and the second scene is visible when the text block fanned the other direction.
- A triple fore-edge painting has, in addition to paintings on the edges, a third painting applied to the closed text block edges.
- A panoramic fore-edge painting, is similar to a triple fore-edge painting but rather is a continuous scene wrapped around more than one edge.
- A split double painting has two different illustrations, one on either side of the book's center. When the book is laid open in the center, one illustration is seen on the edges of the first half of the book, and another illustration is on the edge of the second half of the book.
- There are even examples of rare variations that require the book's pages to be pinched or tented in a certain way to see the image.

=== Technique ===
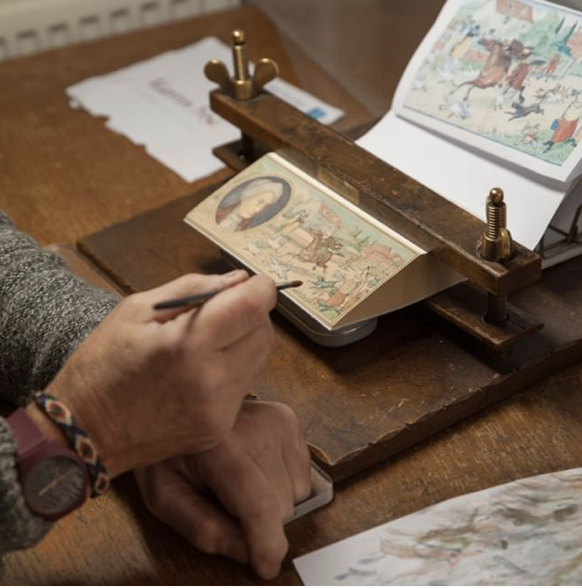
Fore-edge artist painting using a book press

Several tools are advisable when creating a fore-edge painting:

- A book with smooth page edges
- Watercolor paint
- Paint brushes
- Book press
- Gold foil for gilding

Other tools and supplies are recommended as well. A fore-edge painter should not dilute the edges of the paper with water. This can cause swelling of the paper creating wavy and uneven surfaces. A brush should be near dry when applying paint to the edge of the page. If the pages are not smooth, the painter must sand the fore-edge of the book to create a smooth edge for a good painting surface. To keep the pages fanned in place, a book press is necessary to hold the position. Gold gilding is generally applied after the watercolor painting is completed.

== History ==
The earliest fore-edge markings or "letterings" date as far back as the 10th century when books were generally stored horizontally with the fore-edge facing out. Books today are generally stored with the spine facing out and upright. When books were stored horizontally with the fore-edge facing out, the title, author, or other indicator were written on the fore-edge. As book design was standardized, the fore-edge of the book was stored inwards and the spine of the book was utilized as an indicator for title and author.

Early examples of English fore-edge paintings are difficult to accurately date, but they presented heraldic designs in gold and other colors. The first known example of a disappearing fore-edge painting (a painting not visible when the book is closed) dates back to 1649, while the earliest signed and dated fore-edge painting dates to 1653: a family coat of arms painted on a 1651 Bible.

Research by Cyril Davenport (1848 - 1941), former Superintendent of Bookbinding at the British Museum names Samuel Mearne the creator of the art of fore-edge painting during his service as the bookbinder for King Charles II from 1660 to 1683. Davenport found instances of these early fore-edge paintings having been signed by "an artist of the name of Fletcher" (no first name given). Davenport reports a 1641 copy of Acts and Monuments bearing a fore-edge portrait of Charles II, signed by "Fletcher" as the earliest known example of the art.

Carl J. Weber, fore-edge scholar, suggests that fore-edge painting may have been in practice 7–10 years prior to Mearne's "invention". He lists a fore-edge painted copy of The Holy Bible as the first known instance of a signed and dated fore-edge painting. The painting on the 1651 bible is signed and dated by the artists: "S.T. Lewis Fecit Anno Dom 1653." Although the signature "S.T". was originally thought to be the initials of one man, Weber surmises that the work was produced by two (now) known fore-edge artists, brothers Stephen and Thomas Lewis.

Around 1750, the subject matter of fore-edge paintings changed from simply decorative or heraldic designs to landscapes, portraits, and religious scenes usually painted in full color to reflect the coming trend in popularity of the Picturesque.

The fanning technique and gilding to hide the paintings was popularized in the 18th century by John Brindley and Edwards of Halifax. The Edwards were responsible for popularizing the technique in London, and other 18th and 19th century booksellers and binders often mimicked their designs.

Caroline Billin Curry, or Miss C.B. Currie, was a prominent fore-edge painter in the late 19th and early 20th centuries. She began numbering her works using a flyleaf inserted into the book she painted, of which 172 of her fore-edge paintings are known to exist. Also of note is her compatriot, John T. Beer.

Fore-edge painting also made an imprint in China. Chinese painters were influenced by Western fore-edge paintings and began practicing the art overseas in the 20th century.

== Contemporary fore-edge paintings ==
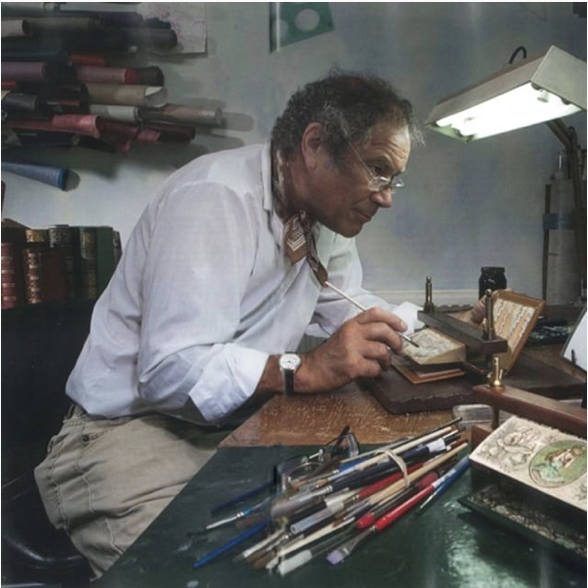
Fore-edge painter Martin Frost working on a book

Fore-edge painting as a craft is deemed critically endangered in the contemporary era. The Heritage Crafts Association (HCA) only lists four “craftspeople currently known” as working in this medium. The remaining artists that practice fore-edge painting are amateurs and leisure makers numbering fewer than sixty. According to the HCA, there are currently no formal trainees in the art form.

Martin Frost in Worthing, United Kingdom, is a professional full-time fore-edge artist in the UK. He has created over 3,500 fore-edge paintings since he started his career in the 1970s.

Clare Brooksbank from Derbyshire, United Kingdom is another artist who has painted close to 2000 fore-edge paintings since the early 1990's.

Brianna Sprague is a fore-edge painter based in the US. She has created over 300 paintings at this time. Focusing on modern books and classics, she has gained attention on the social media apps of TikTok, Reddit, and Instagram. Jeanne Bennett is another known fore-edge painter and has written a book after teaching the art of fore-edge painting for years.

Fore-edge paintings are often called curious, hidden, mysterious, and secret. Nancy Swan's thesis on modern fore-edge painting discusses that it is difficult to know and find modern information about fore-edge paintings and artists because the art itself is hidden from plain view. There is not much scholarly research performed on the subject as discussed by Carl J. Weber in his first book published in 1949. However, information on technique and the making process exists through video and blog platforms across the internet.

== Collections ==
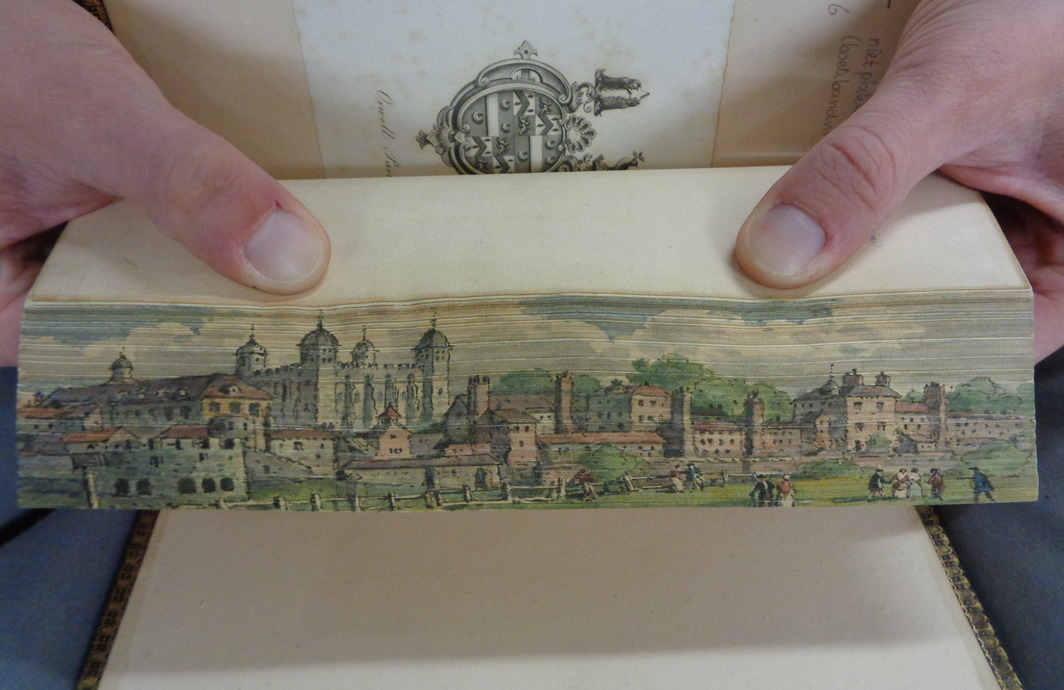
Fore-edge painting of the Tower of London, 1820-1840

- College of William and Mary's Earl Gregg Swem Library holds a collection of 709 fore-edge paintings in the Ralph H. Wark Collection, the largest collection of fore-edge painted books in America.
- Loyola-Notre Dame Library, the library shared by Loyola University Maryland and Notre Dame of Maryland University, have a collection of more than 300 fore-edge painted volumes.
- Boston Public Library has a collection of 258 fore-edge paintings, one of the larger collections in the United States, and many examples are displayed online.
- Brandeis University holds 22 fore-edge paintings in their Special Collections Library in a collection called Reuben M. and Regine Ginsberg Collection of Fore-edge Painted Books.
- Estelle Doheny Collection housed in the Edward Laurence Doheny Memorial Library at St. John's Seminary, Camarillo, California, is described as "roughly twice as large" as the collection at the Boston Public Library.
- University of New Mexico's Center for Southwest Research & Special Collections holds 102 fore-edge paintings from the collection of Lucia von Borosini Batten of Albuquerque. Many were formerly owned by Estelle Doheny, who married her husband, oil baron Edward L. Doheny, in New Mexico Territory in 1900. Three paintings by Miss C. B. Currie are available.
- Syracuse University's Special Collections Research Center has the Poushter Collection, with more than 90 volumes.
- Louisiana State University Library holds at least 37 fore-edge paintings in its Rare Book Collection. Several are probably by the artist identified by Jeff Weber as the "American City View Painter".
- Clark University holds the Robert H. Goddard Library's Rare Book Collection, which includes 17 books with fore-edge paintings.
- Mudd Library at Lawrence University has a varied collection of books with fore-edge art that were donated by two alumnae, Dorothy Ross Pain Lawrence class of 1918, and Bernice Davis Fligman Milwaukee-Downer class of 1922.
- Hofstra University has in their collection a few fore-edge books, some of which are Les Psaumes de David and Outlines from the Figures and Compositions upon the Greek, Roman and Etruscan Vases of the Late Sir William Hamilton.
- George Peabody Library in Baltimore, Maryland also contains a collection of books with fore-edge paintings within its Dorothy McIlvain Scott Collection.
- The National Library of the Netherlands has a few fore-edge books, e.g. KW 1740 F 1 (a pendrawing and aquarelle in shades of blue, green, yellow and red, depicting a lake surrounded by mountains and on the righthand side a castle with docking place and boats) and KW 1740 F 2 (a pendrawing and aquarelle in shades of blue, green and red, depicting the Tower of London surrounded by houses and an meadow with walking people), 1786 B 24 or 1773 D 25.
- The Library of Trinity College Dublin's digitized Elsbeth and Bettina Bollmann Collection contains books with fore-edge paintings.
- The University of Wisconsin - Madison Special Collections Library has a collection of fore-edge paintings: Nancy Swan Collection of books with fore-edge paintings. Gift of Robert and Virginia Douglas. These books can be found through the library catalog.
- Grand Valley State University fore-edge paintings digital collections
- The Bentley Rare Book Gallery, Kennesaw State University includes video examples
- George Peabody Library Collection of Fore-edge Paintings & Decorated Bindings

== Gallery ==
Images from the Dorothy McIlvain Scott Collection at George Peabody Library

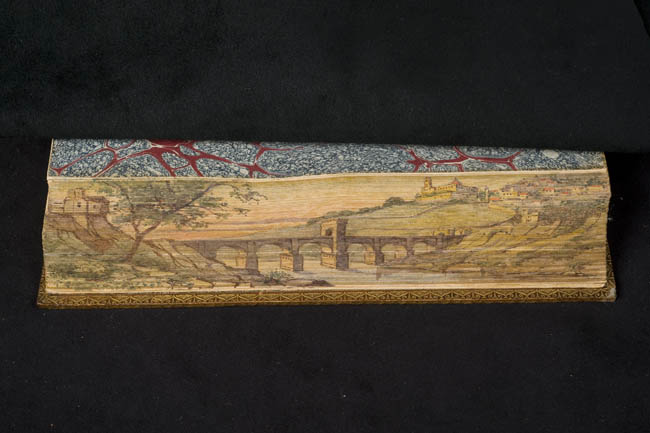
Childe Harold's Pilgrimage (Lord Byron, 1812–1818)

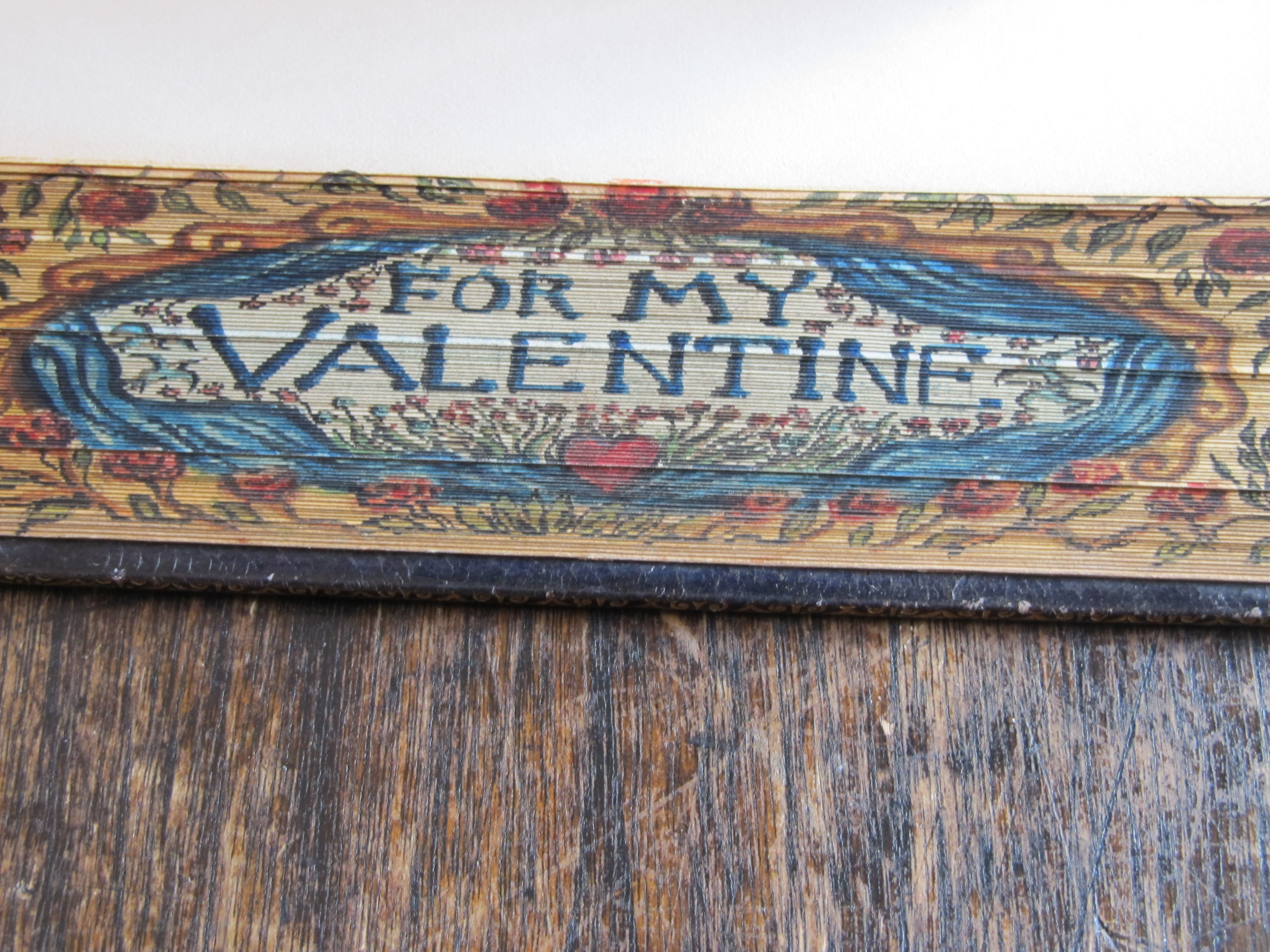
The New Casket (1850) by Joseph Martin Kronheim

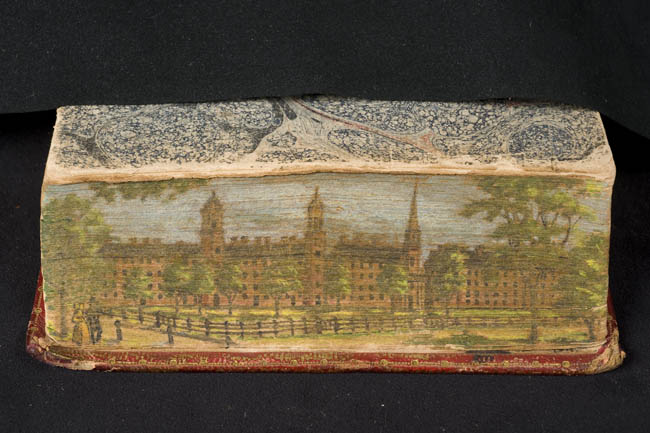
Sacred Poetry (Jeremy Belknap, 1744)

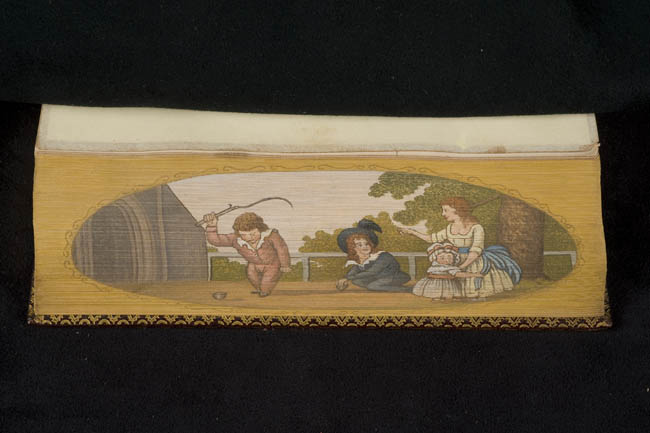
Rogers' Poems (Samuel Rogers, 1834)

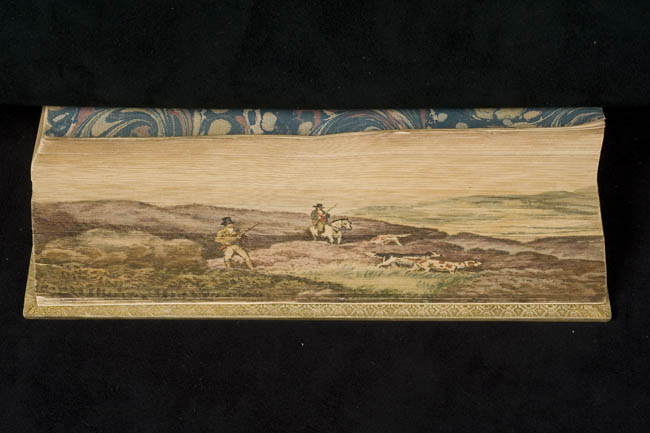
Sports and Pastimes of the People of England (Joseph Strutt, 1801)
