= Giedo van der Garde =

Dutch racing driver (born 1985)

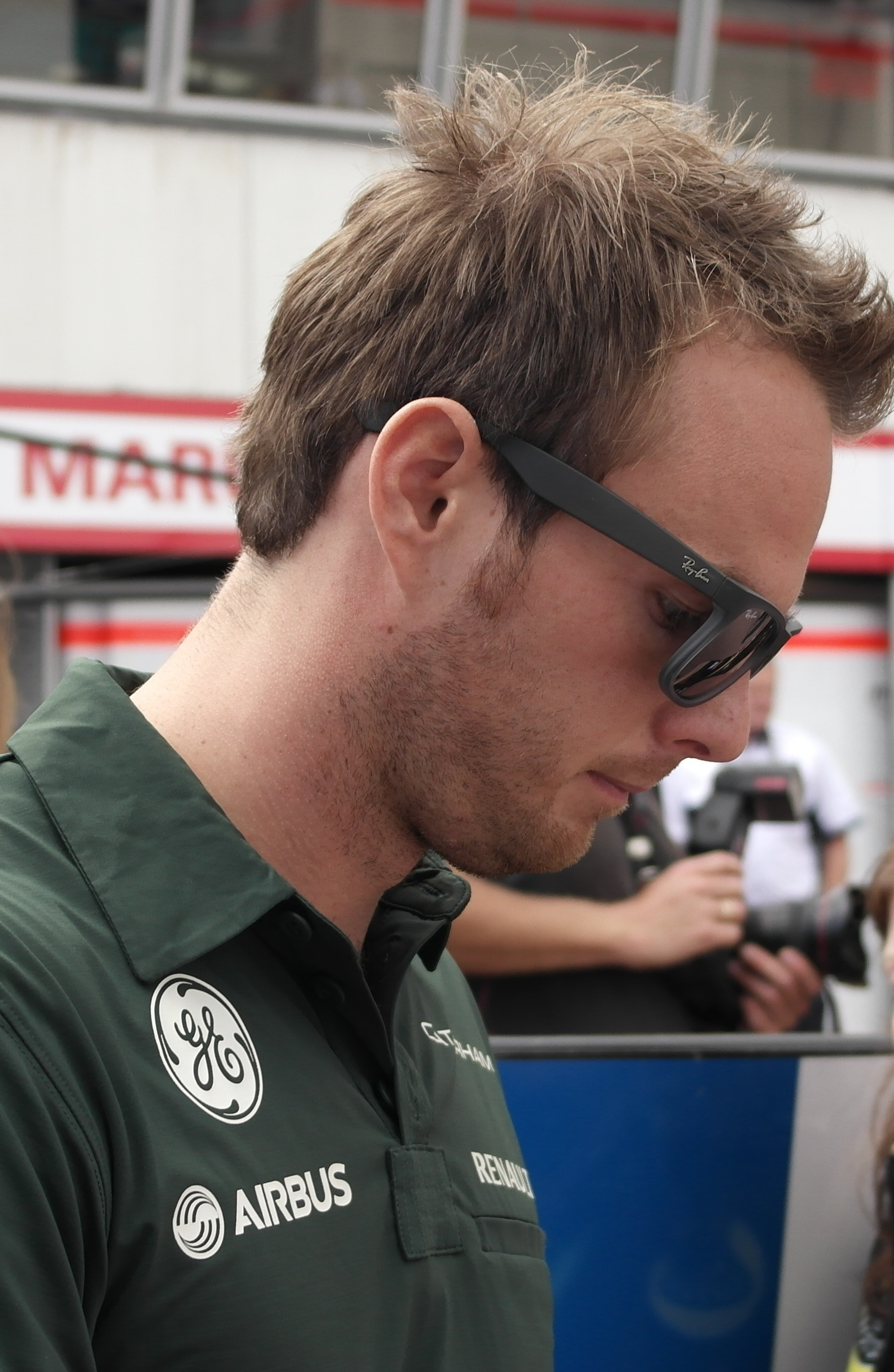
- Van der Garde at the 2013 Monaco Grand Prix
- Born: Giedo Gijsbertus Gerrit van der Garde; 25 April 1985 (age 41); Rhenen, Netherlands

Formula One World Championship career
- Nationality: (Netherlands) Dutch
- Active years: 2013
- Team: Caterham
- Entries: 19
- Championships: 0
- Wins: 0
- Podiums: 0
- Career points: 0
- Pole positions: 0
- Fastest laps: 0
- First entry: 2013 Australian Grand Prix
- Last entry: 2013 Brazilian Grand Prix

FIA World Endurance Championship career
- Categorisation: FIA Platinum
- Years active: 2016, 2018–2021, 2023
- Teams: G-Drive, ESM, Nederland, United
- Starts: 27
- Championships: 0
- Wins: 2
- Podiums: 5
- Poles: 1
- Fastest laps: 1
- Best finish: 6th in 2019–20 (LMP2)

European Le Mans Series career
- Years active: 2016, 2021
- Teams: G-Drive, Nederland
- Starts: 7
- Championships: 1 (2016)
- Wins: 2
- Podiums: 4
- Poles: 0
- Fastest laps: 1
- Best finish: 1st in 2016 (LMP2)

24 Hours of Le Mans career
- Years: 2016, 2018–2021, 2023
- Teams: G-Drive, Nederland, Graff
- Best finish: 11th (2018)
- Class wins: 0

Previous series
- 2021–2023 2017 2009–2012 2008–2011 2007–2008 2004–2006 2003 2003: IMSA SportsCar; Audi Sport TT Cup; GP2 Series; GP2 Asia Series; Formula Renault 3.5; F3 Euro Series; Formula Renault Eurocup; Dutch Formula Renault

Championship titles
- 2008: Formula Renault 3.5

Giedo Gijsbertus Gerrit van der Garde (Dutch pronunciation: [ˈɣiːdoː vɑn dər ˈɣɑrdə]; born 25 April 1985) is a Dutch former racing driver and broadcaster, who competed in Formula One in 2013, and the FIA World Endurance Championship between 2016 and 2023. (Note: The exact years van der Garde competed in the FIA World Endurance Championship: 2016, 2018–2021, 2023.) In sportscar racing, Van der Garde won the European Le Mans Series in 2016 with G-Drive.

Born and raised in Rhenen, van der Garde began competitive kart racing aged nine. After a successful karting career—culminating in his victory at the senior World Championship in 2002—van der Garde graduated to junior formulae. He won his first championship at the 2008 Formula Renault 3.5 Series with P1. After four seasons and several wins in the GP2 Series, van der Garde signed for Caterham in 2013, having previously tested for Super Aguri and Spyker, as well as being a member of the McLaren Young Driver Programme in 2006. Van der Garde made his Formula One debut at the Australian Grand Prix, but Caterham failed to score points all season with the CT03, with Van der Garde finishing a career-best 14th in Hungary. Failing to retain his seat for 2014, Van der Garde signed for Sauber as a reserve driver. Despite being contracted as a full-time driver for 2015, Sauber signed Felipe Nasr, resulting in a multi-million pound settlement after van der Garde sought international arbitration.

Van der Garde moved to sportscar racing in 2016, joining G-Drive Racing in both the European Le Mans Series and the FIA World Endurance Championship in the LMP2 class, winning the former in his debut season after achieving multiple victories. He spent five further seasons in WEC and the IMSA SportsCar Championship with Nederland, amongst six appearances at the 24 Hours of Le Mans. Van der Garde retired at the end of 2023, becoming a full-time commentator and pundit for Viaplay.

== Early life and career ==
Giedo Gijsbertus Gerrit van der Garde was born on 25 April 1985 in Rhenen, Netherlands.

=== Karting ===
Van der Garde had a successful karting career, winning the Dutch championship in 1998. In Super A, he was the best rookie in 2001 and the world champion in 2002. He was a protégé of Jos Verstappen.

=== Formula Renault ===
The following year, van der Garde joined the Formula Renault 2000 Championship and finished sixth, driving for the Dutch team Van Amersfoort Racing. On the strength of his performance, he became part of the Renault F1 Driver Development programme.

=== Formula Three ===
Van der Garde joined the Formula 3 Euro Series in 2004 with Signature-Plus, but after finishing the year ninth, he was dropped by Renault Driver Development. A move to Team Rosberg for 2005 yielded another ninth in the series.

For 2006, van der Garde joined the ASM team, which had dominated the season in 2005 with Lewis Hamilton and Adrian Sutil. The team claimed the top two places in the championship once more in 2006 – but it was Van der Garde's teammates Paul di Resta and Sebastian Vettel who topped the leader board. He ended the year sixth with a single victory.

=== Formula Renault 3.5 Series ===
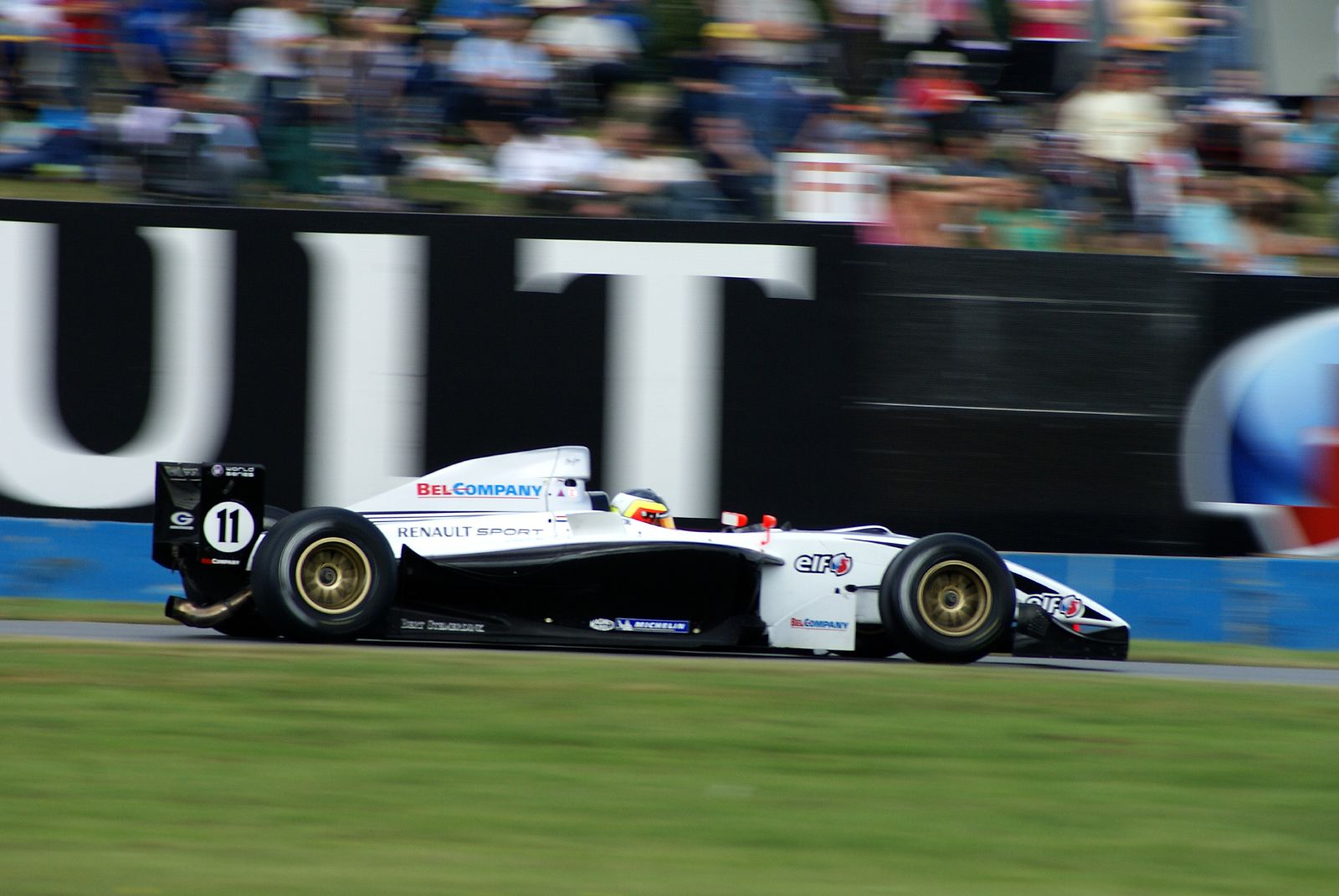
Van der Garde driving for Victory Engineering at the Donington Park round of the 2007 Formula Renault 3.5 Series season.

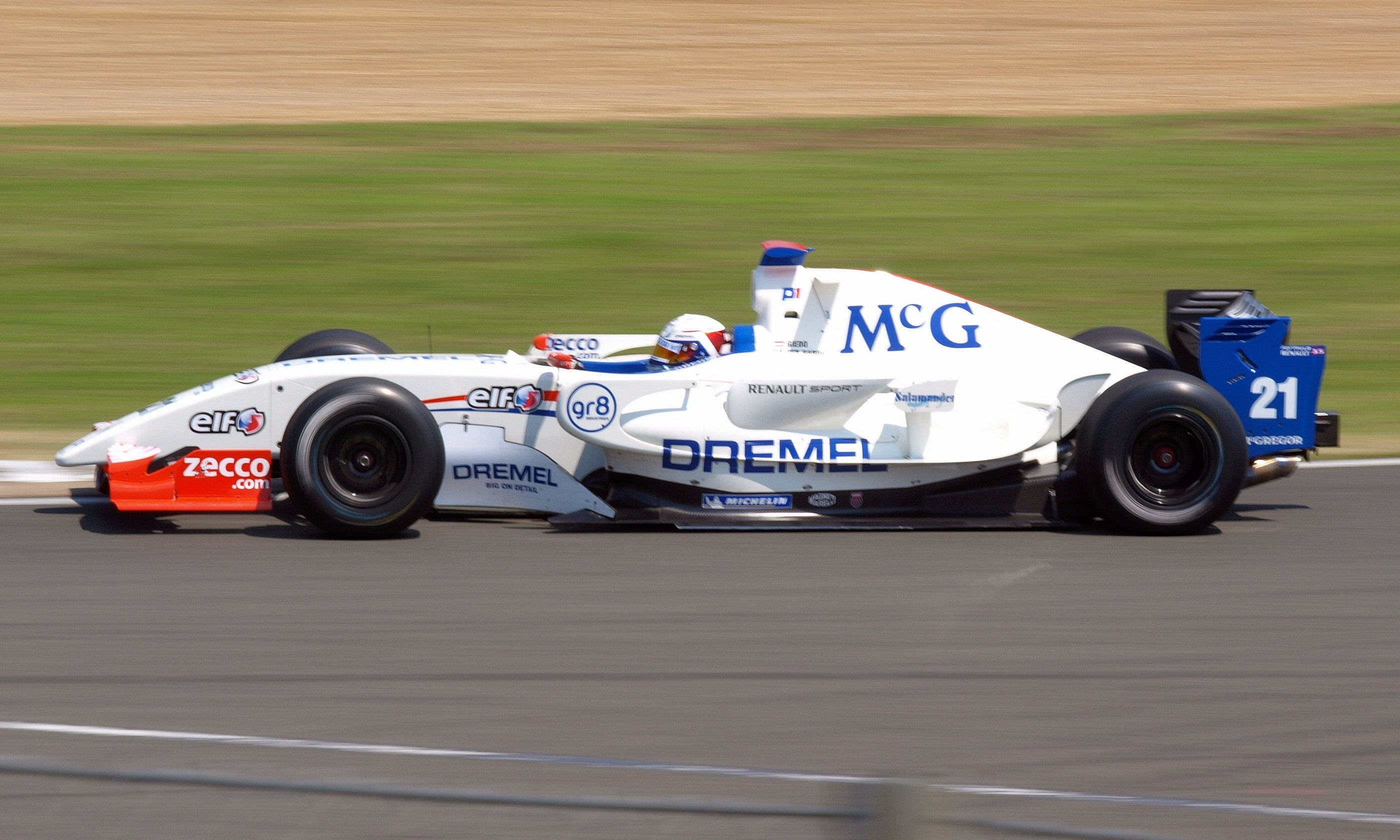
Van der Garde driving for P1 Motorsport at the Silverstone round of the 2008 Formula Renault 3.5 Series season.

On 17 December 2006, van der Garde also announced that he would drive in the Formula Renault 3.5 Series for Victory Engineering, a team that works together with Carlin Motorsport.

Van der Garde had podium positions in mind for the season, but even though he was the most consistent driver, always around sixth or fifth, he did not win nor reach the podium. He finished the season sixth, third in the Rookie of the year standings. He received several offers for tests in GP2, from teams like DAMS and Arden International, during which he impressed.

Van der Garde eventually signed with P1 Motorsport to compete in the 2008 season.

In the first race of the 2008 FR3.5 season in Monza, van der Garde managed to qualify on pole for the feature race. Due to regulations, he started eighth in the sprint race because of the reverse grid order in the sprint race. He came through the field to clinch victory in the sprint race, and easily converted his pole position into a victory in the feature race to show his fine form in the start of the season.

In the second race at Spa, van der Garde narrowly missed out on pole by 0.033 seconds after previously topping the tables at all practice sessions. In the sprint race, Julien Jousse collided into him, forcing van der Garde into retiring from the race. Having qualified second for the feature race, he lost a position at the start. He immediately overtook Mikhail Aleshin on the first lap to regain his position, and later overtook Marco Bonanomi for the lead which he held to the checkered flag.

After this strong start to the season, van der Garde was never headed in the championship and duly won it with two races remaining.

=== GP2 Series ===
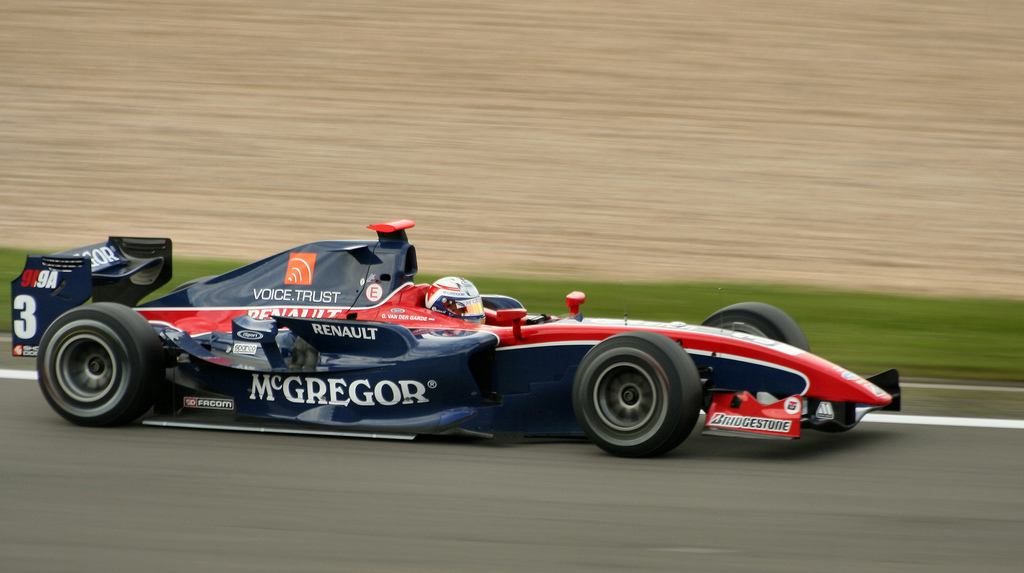
Van der Garde driving for iSport International at the Nürburgring round of the 2009 GP2 Series season.

Van der Garde signed to drive for the iSport International team in the 2008–09 GP2 Asia Series season, and in the 2009 GP2 Series season. At the Hungaroring, he took his first victory, in the sprint race. He added two more wins before the end of the season en route to seventh in the championship standings.

Van der Garde had not been due to compete in the 2009–10 GP2 Asia season, but competed in the second round for Barwa Addax. He drove for the same team in the 2010 GP2 Series season, equalling his seventh place in the drivers' championship, whilst team-mate Sergio Pérez was runner-up.

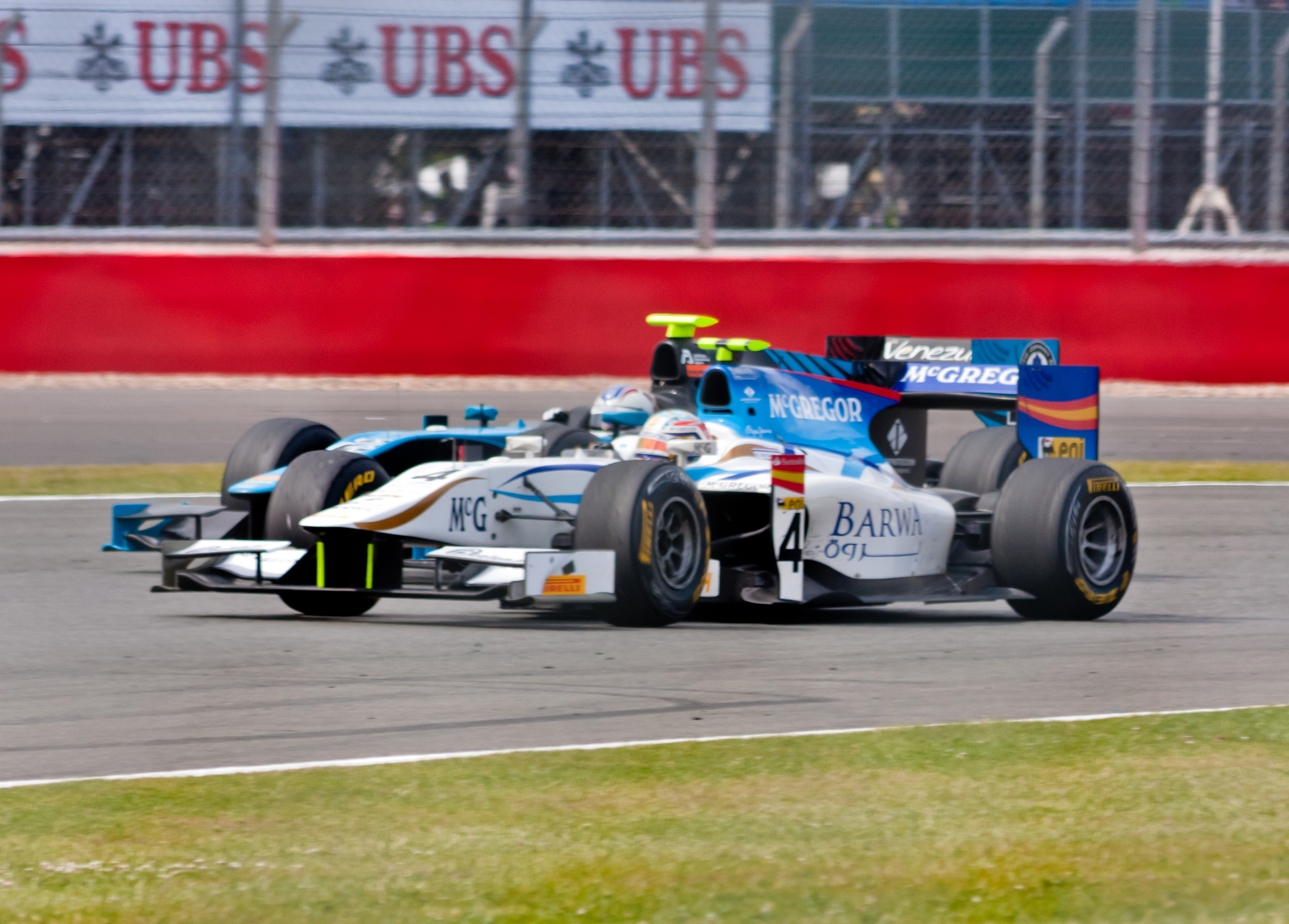
Van der Garde driving for Barwa Addax at the Silverstone round of the 2011 GP2 Series season.

Van der Garde remained with Barwa Addax for the 2011 GP2 Asia Series season, with Charles Pic replacing the Formula One-bound Pérez as his team-mate. He finished third in the championship, behind Romain Grosjean and Jules Bianchi, and led the main series after two rounds despite not winning a race. He did, however, take his first series pole position and fastest lap at Catalunya. He originally took pole position for the Monaco round as well, but was then penalised for an incident in qualifying. He took no points from the weekend and lost his championship lead to Grosjean, who eventually secured the title with one round of the series remaining. He held second place in the championship until the last round of the season at Monza, where he had a disastrous weekend and slipped back to fifth in the standings, behind Luca Filippi, Bianchi and Pic.

As part of his deal to become the Caterham Formula One team's reserve driver, van der Garde joined the marque's GP2 team for the 2012 season, alongside Rodolfo González. He returned to the winner's circle with race victories at Catalunya and Singapore, but again was not consistent enough to mount a championship challenge, finishing sixth in the points standings.

On 9 February 2015, van der Garde returned to this series for testing, racking up over 350 km at the Circuit Ricardo Tormo. He drove for Campos Racing (previously known as Addax), for the first time.

== Formula One career ==
2006 saw van der Garde being brought into the McLaren Young Drivers Programme.

On 15 December 2006, van der Garde was confirmed as the Super Aguri Formula One team's test and reserve driver for the 2007 season.

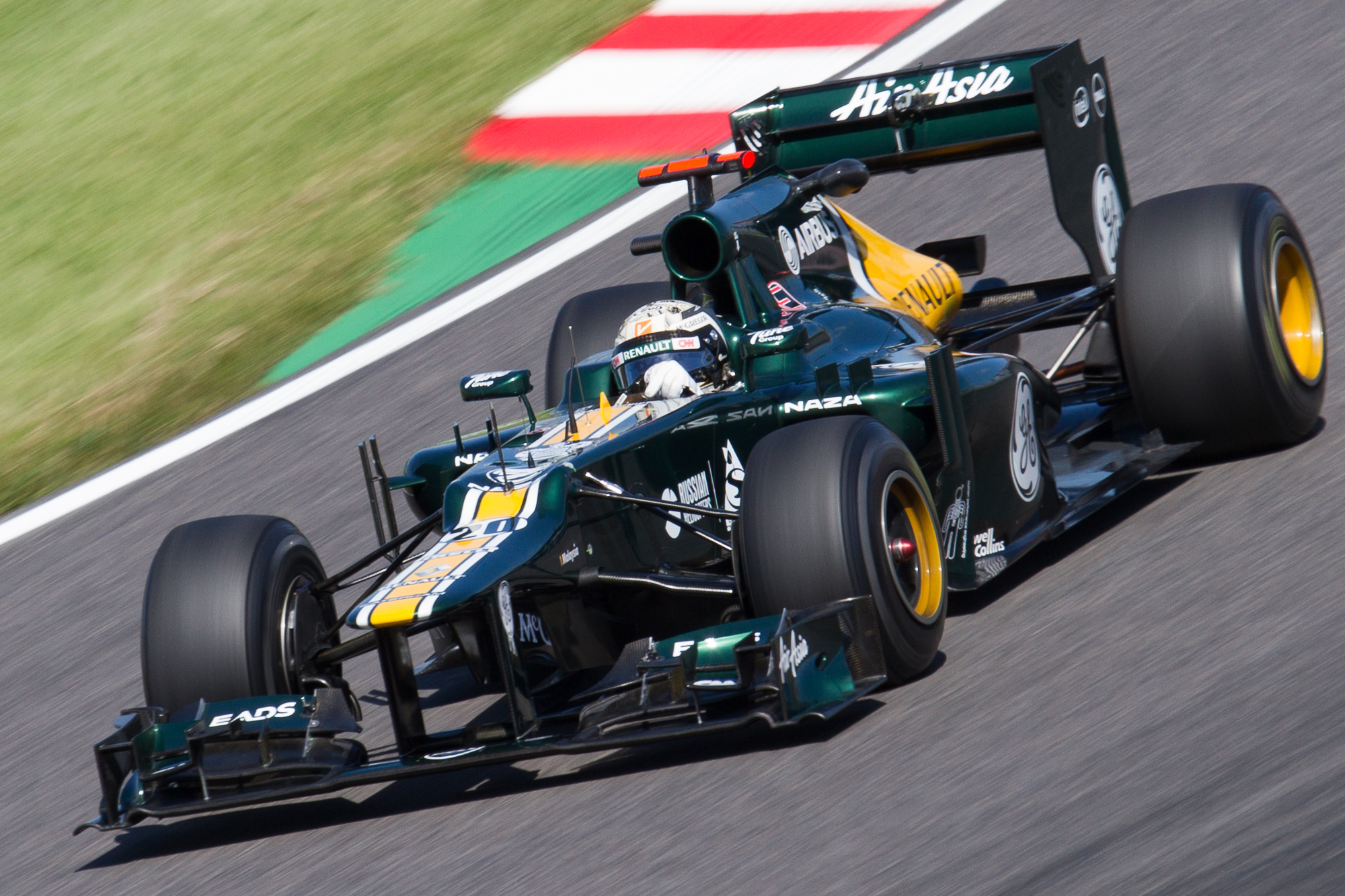
Van der Garde drove for Caterham in free practice for the 2012 Japanese Grand Prix.

On 1 February 2007, van der Garde was unexpectedly announced by Spyker F1 as the team's test and reserve driver. On 2 February 2007, Super Aguri confirmed their belief their existing contract with van der Garde was still in force, stating "Super Aguri F1 Team has a valid contract with Giedo van der Garde to drive for the team in the position of Friday and Test Driver for the 2007 FIA Formula One World Championship. The contract was submitted by the SAF1 Team to the Contracts Recognition Board on 23rd January 2007." However, on 20 June 2007, van der Garde tested at Silverstone with Spyker, indicating the contract dispute had been resolved. Spyker originally intended van der Garde to be the team's Friday driver at the Australian Grand Prix, but he failed to obtain the necessary superlicence from the FIA in time.

Van der Garde was a candidate to race in Formula One for Virgin in 2011, but that seat eventually went to Belgian Jérôme d'Ambrosio.

=== Caterham (2012–2013) ===
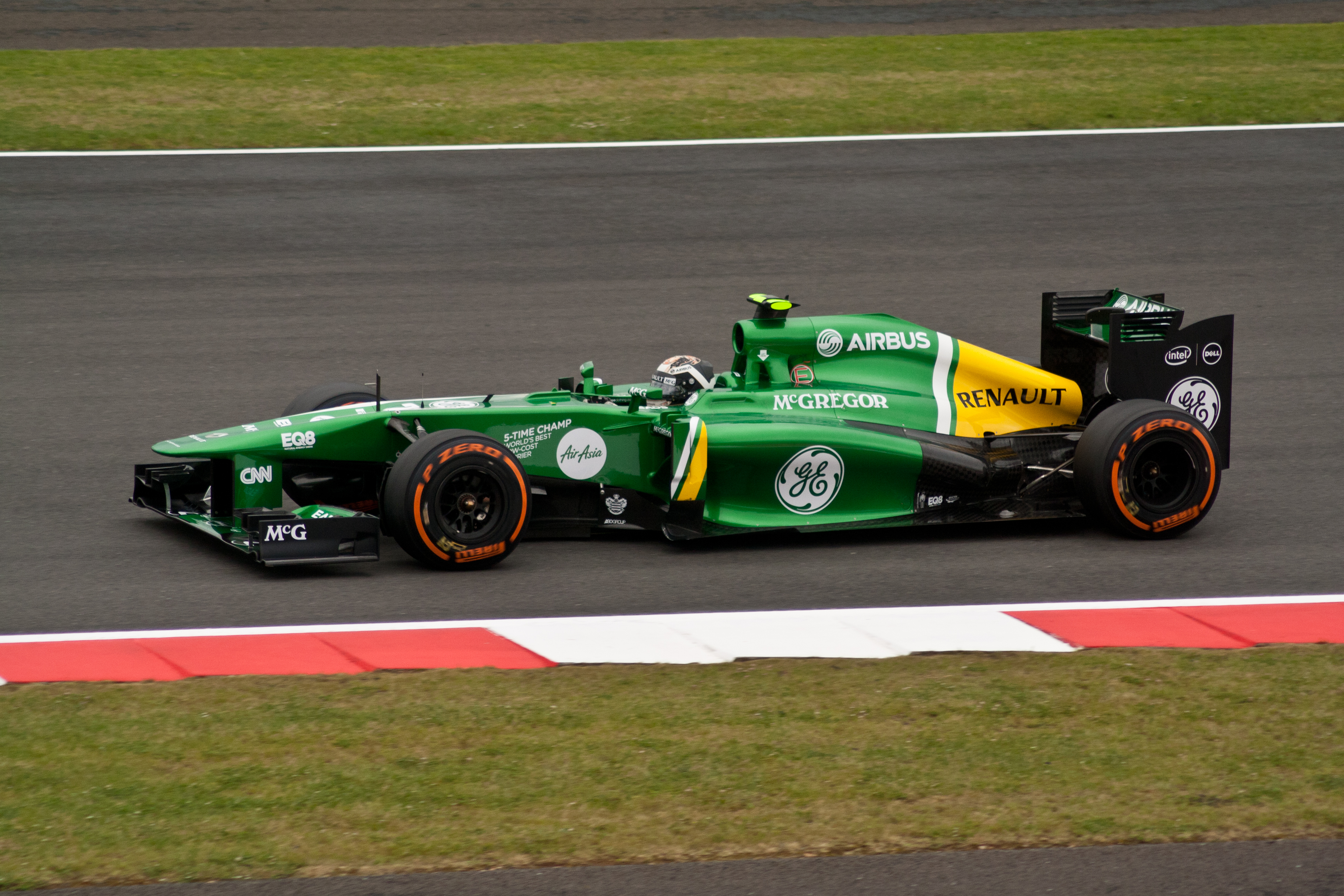
Van der Garde at the 2013 British Grand Prix.

On 4 February 2012, it was announced that van der Garde would be Reserve Driver for Caterham F1 for the 2012 Formula One season. Van der Garde's first Friday practice session came at the 2012 Chinese Grand Prix; he went on to complete six Friday practice sessions throughout the 2012 season.

On 1 February 2013, van der Garde's management announced that he would drive for Caterham as their second driver for the 2013 Formula One season, next to Charles Pic. Van der Garde finished his first Formula One race with an 18th place at the 2013 Australian Grand Prix.

At the 2013 Monaco Grand Prix, van der Garde achieved Caterham's highest ever qualifying place with 15th, this was also the first time that a Caterham made it to Q2 in the 2013 season. Van der Garde equalled his career best 15th during the race despite an early collision with Williams F1 driver Pastor Maldonado. He later improved on this performance by finishing 14th during the 2013 Hungarian Grand Prix, ahead of his teammate Pic as well as Marussia drivers Jules Bianchi and Max Chilton.

Van der Garde then bested his previous best qualifying position at the 2013 Belgian Grand Prix by qualifying 14th after electing to go on slicks on a continuously drying track, having finished the Q1 session in third place after adopting a similar strategy. But despite a good start that saw him remain in touch with the more established teams for the first few laps, he was unable to improve upon his grid position and finished 16th, a lap down on the leaders.

=== Sauber (2014–2015) ===
2014

On 21 January 2014, it was announced that van der Garde had joined Sauber F1 Team as a reserve and test driver for the 2014 season. He took part in the first free practice session in seven of the season's Grands Prix in this role.

During events that became public in 2015, van der Garde has claimed that, although in June 2014 he was guaranteed a position as one of the Sauber's two nominated race drivers for the 2015 Formula One season, by November 2014, the team informed him that he was no longer required. The team instead announced Marcus Ericsson and Felipe Nasr as their race drivers for the 2015 season, causing Van der Garde to file an international arbitration complaint with the Swiss Chambers’ Arbitration Institution in December 2014.

2015

On 2 March 2015, the Swiss Chambers’ Arbitration Institution released a partial award upholding van der Garde's contract and ordering Sauber to "refrain from taking any action the effect of which would be to deprive Mr. van der Garde of his entitlement to participate in the 2015 Formula One Season as one of Sauber's two nominated race drivers."

On 5 March 2015, through his management company, van der Garde then filed an application in an Australian Court to enforce the Swiss award. In this instance, Australia was the appropriate jurisdiction as it was the location of the first F1 Grand Prix for the season. The court permitted Sauber's new drivers, Ericsson and Nasr (who were not parties to the Swiss arbitration), to be represented and heard.

On 11 March 2015, van der Garde obtained Court orders enforcing his Swiss award thus compelling Sauber to permit Van der Garde to participate at the Australian Grand Prix held in Melbourne, with F1 sessions scheduled from Friday, 13 to Sunday, 15 March. Sauber's response was to appeal that decision and publicly announce that they would not compromise the safety of the team or other drivers by putting van der Garde in the car, because the Sauber C34 chassis had been tailored to fit Ericsson and Nasr who, through their lawyers, also joined in the appeal.

The appeal was heard the following day, on Thursday, 12 March 2015, at which time Sauber also argued that van der Garde's contract had been terminated by the team in February with the approval of the FIA's Contract Recognition Board and that Van der Garde violated the confidentiality clauses of the contract by discussing it with the media. Lawyers representing Ericsson and Nasr further argued that Van der Garde had not followed due process by failing to give prior notice of his legal action until after it was instituted. That appeal, however, was dismissed with the court upholding the previous order for Sauber to allow van der Garde be allowed to participate in that weekend's race. Further, the court adjourned the hearing until the following day to hear submissions on contempt of court proceedings brought by Van der Garde's lawyers against Sauber's team principal, Monisha Kaltenborn.

Due to the risk of having its assets seized for disobeying court orders, Sauber opted to abort participation in Friday morning's first practice session for the Australian Grand Prix. Nevertheless, based on media speculation about Bernie Ecclestone's intervention to avoid further negative publicity on the sport, Ericsson and Nasr did participate in Friday afternoon's second practice session.

On Saturday, 14 March 2015, the dispute reached a temporary resolution thanks to van der Garde announcing that he would forego racing in Melbourne, with a view to finding a more permanent solution in the future. The Sauber team and its new drivers for 2015, Ericsson and Nasr, were thus able to complete the Australian Grand Prix's Saturday qualifying session and Sunday race.

On 18 March 2015, van der Garde confirmed that he and Sauber had reached a settlement after he relinquished, once and for all, his rights to race in F1 with the team. In return for termination of the contract by mutual consent, it is reported that van der Garde received compensation in the amount of US$16 million. The controversy, however, continued thanks to a statement released by van der Garde revealing further background and indicating that his intention had also been that of promoting the rights of racing drivers whose contracts are often not honoured. In response, the Sauber team expressed surprise at van der Garde's post-settlement statement opting to not comment further on the matter.

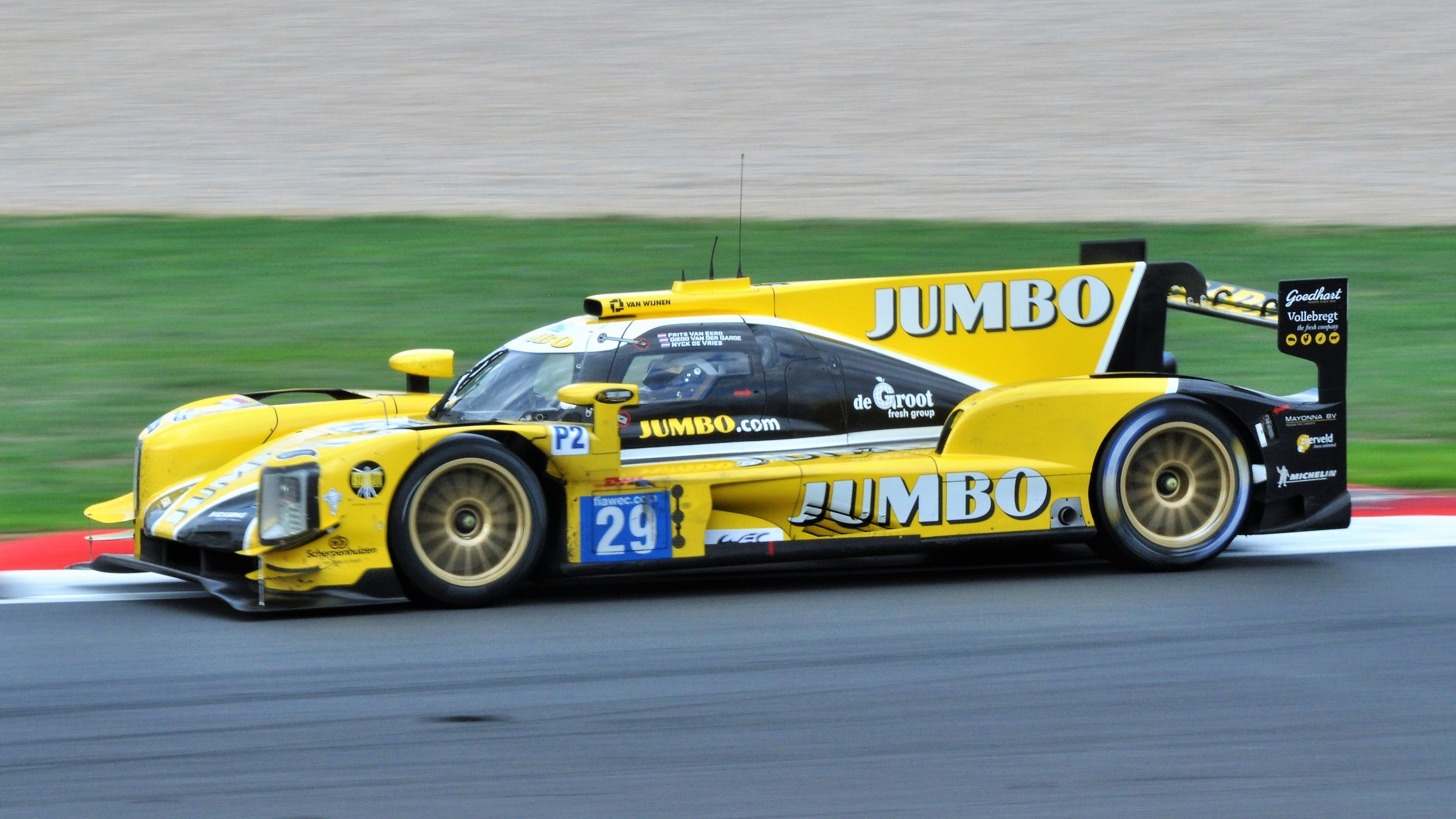
Van der Garde driving in the 2018 6 Hours of Silverstone.

=== Post-Sauber (2015–present) ===
In April 2015, van der Garde's manager downplayed rumours of a return to Formula 1 during that season, with Manor Marussia, adding that the focus was for a 2016 race seat in DTM or LMP1.

=== TV career ===
As Max Verstappen joined Formula 1 in 2015, van der Garde was often asked for his analysis in Dutch TV Shows. Between 2015 and 2021, van der Garde was a usual guest in several Dutch TV shows to talk about Verstappen in Formula One. In December 2021, it was announced that van der Garde would join the analyst team of Viaplay from 2022 onwards. At the new Dutch sports channel, van der Garde is accompanied by other analysts such as former Formula One driver Christijan Albers and racing driver Tom Coronel.

== Sportscar career ==
=== 2016: ELMS title ===
For the 2016 season, van der Garde would return to racing, making his maiden sportscar racing appearance with G-Drive Racing in the European Le Mans Series. Partnering with Simon Dolan and Harry Tincknell, he went on to take the title in his debut season, with the outfit having taken victory at Silverstone and Estoril.

Van der Garde would also make his debut at the 24 Hours of Le Mans during the same year.

== Racing record ==
=== Career summary ===
Season	Series	Team name	Races	Wins	Poles	F/Laps	Podiums	Points	Position
2003	Formula Renault 2000 Masters	Van Amersfoort Racing	6	0	2	0	3	72	6th
2003	Dutch Formula Renault Championship	Van Amersfoort Racing	?	?	?	?	?	69	4th
2003	Zandvoort Masters Championship	Van Amersfoort Racing	?	?	?	?	?	?	**2nd**
2004	Formula 3 Euro Series	Opel Team Signature-Plus	20	0	0	0	2	37	9th
2004	Masters of Formula 3	Opel Team Signature-Plus	1	0	0	0	0	N/A	13th
2004	Macau Grand Prix	Opel Team Signature-Plus	1	0	0	0	0	N/A	15th
2004	Bahrain Superprix	Opel Team Signature-Plus	1	0	0	0	0	N/A	15th
2005	Formula 3 Euro Series	Team Rosberg	20	0	1	1	2	34	9th
2005	Masters of Formula 3	Team Rosberg	1	0	0	0	0	N/A	6th
2006	Formula 3 Euro Series	ASM Formule 3	20	1	2	0	4	37	6th
2006	Masters of Formula 3	ASM Formule 3	1	0	1	1	1	N/A	**2nd**
2007	Formula One	Spyker F1	Test driver						
2007	Formula Renault 3.5 Series	Victory Engineering	17	0	0	0	0	67	6th
2008	Formula One	Force India	Test driver						
2008	Formula Renault 3.5 Series	P1 Motorsport	15	5	2	3	8	137	**1st**
2008–09	GP2 Asia Series	GFH Team iSport	10	1	0	0	0	11	12th
2009	GP2 Series	iSport International	20	3	0	0	3	34	7th
2009–10	GP2 Asia Series	Barwa Addax Team	2	0	0	0	0	0	34th
2010	GP2 Series	Barwa Addax Team	20	0	0	0	4	39	7th
2011	GP2 Series	Barwa Addax Team	18	0	1	1	5	49	5th
2011	GP2 Asia Series	Barwa Addax Team	4	0	0	0	2	16	**3rd**
2012	Formula One	Caterham F1 Team	Test driver						
2012	GP2 Series	Caterham Racing	24	2	2	2	6	160	6th
2013	Formula One	Caterham F1 Team	19	0	0	0	0	0	22nd
2014	Formula One	Sauber F1 Team	Test driver						
2016	European Le Mans Series - LMP2	G-Drive Racing	6	2	0	1	4	103	**1st**
2016	24 Hours of Le Mans - LMP2	G-Drive Racing	1	0	0	0	0	N/A	DNF
2016	FIA World Endurance Championship - LMP2	G-Drive Racing	2	0	0	0	0	30	21st
2016	FIA World Endurance Championship - LMP2	Extreme Speed Motorsports	2	0	0	0	0	30	21st
2017	Audi Sport TT Cup	Audi Sport	2	0	0	0	0	0	NC†
2018	24 Hours of Le Mans - LMP2	Racing Team Nederland	1	0	0	0	0	N/A	7th
2018–19	FIA World Endurance Championship - LMP2	Racing Team Nederland	8	0	0	0	0	85	7th
2019	24 Hours of Le Mans - LMP2	Racing Team Nederland	1	0	0	0	0	N/A	15th
2019–20	FIA World Endurance Championship - LMP2	Racing Team Nederland	8	1	1	1	4	130	6th
2021	FIA World Endurance Championship - LMP2	Racing Team Nederland	5	0	0	0	0	52	9th
2021	24 Hours of Le Mans - LMP2	Racing Team Nederland	1	0	0	0	0	N/A	11th
2021	IMSA SportsCar Championship - LMP2	Racing Team Nederland	1	0	0	0	0	0	NC‡
2021	European Le Mans Series - LMP2	Racing Team Nederland	1	0	0	0	0	0	NC†
2022	IMSA SportsCar Championship - LMP2	Racing Team Nederland	3	0	0	2	3	676	15th
2023	IMSA SportsCar Championship - LMP2	TDS Racing	7	0	0	1	2	1832	4th
2023	FIA World Endurance Championship - LMP2	United Autosports	2	1	0	0	1	37	14th
2023	24 Hours of Le Mans - LMP2	Graff Racing	1	0	0	0	0	N/A	17th

^{†} As Van der Garde was a guest driver, he was ineligible for points. ^{‡} Points only counted towards the Michelin Endurance Cup, and not the overall LMP2 Championship.

=== Complete Eurocup Formula Renault 2000 results ===
(key) (Races in bold indicate pole position) (Races in italics indicate fastest lap)

Year	Entrant	1	2	3	4	5	6	7	8	DC	Points
2003	Van Amersfoort Racing	BRN; 1	BRN; 2	ASS; 1; 14	ASS; 2 Ret	**OSC**; **1**; 19	OSC; 2; 3	DON; 1; 2	**DON**; **2**; 2	6th	72

=== Complete Formula 3 Euro Series results ===
(key) (Races in bold indicate pole position) (Races in italics indicate fastest lap)

Year	Entrant	Chassis	Engine	1	2	3	4	5	6	7	8	9	10	11	12	13	14	15	16	17	18	19	20	DC	Points
2004	Opel Team Signature-Plus	Dallara F302/018	Spiess-Opel	HOC; 1; 9	HOC; 2; 4	EST; 1; 16	EST; 2; 6	ADR; 1; 3	ADR; 1; 6	PAU; 1; 12	PAU; 2 Ret	NOR; 1 Ret	NOR; 1; 12	MAG; 1; 18	MAG; 2; 7	NÜR; 1; 7	NÜR; 2; 12	ZAN; 1; 4	ZAN; 2; 8	BRN; 1; 5	BRN; 2; 3	HOC; 1; 12	HOC; 2; 22	9th	37
2005	Team Rosberg	Dallara F305/039	Spiess-Opel	HOC; 1 Ret	HOC; 2; 4	PAU; 1; 6	PAU; 2; 15	SPA; 1 Ret	SPA; 2; 17	MON; 1; 11	MON; 2 Ret	OSC; 1; 17	OSC; 2; 6	NOR; 1 Ret	NOR; 2 Ret	NÜR; 1; 8	NÜR; 2; 5	ZAN; 1 Ret	ZAN; 2; 3	**LAU**; **1**; 2	LAU; 2; 6	HOC; 1 Ret	HOC; 2; 13	9th	34
2006	ASM Formule 3	Dallara F306/012	Mercedes	HOC; 1 Ret	HOC; 2; 7	LAU; 1; 12	LAU; 2; 9	OSC; 1 Ret	OSC; 2; 11	BRH; 1; 4	BRH; 2; 19	**NOR**; **1**; 6	NOR; 2; 1	NÜR; 1; 3	NÜR; 2; 11	ZAN; 1; 2	ZAN; 2; 5	CAT; 1; 16	CAT; 2; 8	**LMS**; **1** DNS	LMS; 2; 12	HOC; 1; 9	HOC; 2; 2	6th	37

=== Complete Formula Renault 3.5 Series results ===
(key) (Races in bold indicate pole position) (Races in italics indicate fastest lap)

Year	Team	1	2	3	4	5	6	7	8	9	10	11	12	13	14	15	16	17	Pos	Points
2007	Victory Engineering	MNZ; 1; 19†	MNZ; 2; 12	NÜR; 1; 7	NÜR; 2; 19	MON; 1; 5	HUN; 1; 6	HUN; 2; 6	SPA; 1; 6	SPA; 2; 5	DON; 1; 21	DON; 2; 12	MAG; 1; 5	MAG; 2; 6	EST; 1; 4	EST; 2; 4	CAT; 1; 6	CAT; 2 Ret	6th	67
2008	P1 Motorsport	MNZ; 1; 1	**MNZ**; **2**; 1	SPA; 1 Ret	SPA; 2; 1	MON; 1; 2	SIL; 1; 5	SIL; 2; 2	HUN; 1; 1	HUN; 2; 21	NÜR; 1; 2	**NÜR**; **2**; 7	LMS; 1 DNS	LMS; 2; 1	EST; 1; 8	EST; 2; 8	CAT; 1 DNS	CAT; 2 Ret	**1st**	**137**

^{†} Driver did not finish the race, but was classified as he completed more than 90% of the race distance.

=== Complete GP2 Series results ===
(key) (Races in bold indicate pole position) (Races in italics indicate fastest lap)

Year	Entrant	1	2	3	4	5	6	7	8	9	10	11	12	13	14	15	16	17	18	19	20	21	22	23	24	DC	Points
2009	iSport International	CAT; FEA; 7	CAT; SPR; 4	MON; FEA; NC	MON; SPR; 11	IST; FEA; 15	IST; SPR; 13	SIL; FEA; Ret	SIL; SPR; 13	NÜR; FEA; 12	NÜR; SPR; Ret	HUN; FEA; 7	HUN; SPR; 1	VAL; FEA; 14	VAL; SPR; Ret	SPA; FEA; 6	SPA; SPR; 1	MNZ; FEA; 1	MNZ; SPR; 6	ALG; FEA; Ret	ALG; SPR; 6					7th	34
2010	Barwa Addax Team	CAT; FEA; 20	CAT; SPR; 9	MON; FEA; 6	MON; SPR; 2	IST; FEA; 4	IST; SPR; 3	VAL; FEA; 4	VAL; SPR; 2	SIL; FEA; 9	SIL; SPR; 7	HOC; FEA; 12	HOC; SPR; 9	HUN; FEA; 5	HUN; SPR; 4	SPA; FEA; 9	SPA; SPR; 2	MNZ; FEA; Ret	MNZ; SPR; Ret	YMC; FEA; Ret	YMC; SPR; 19					7th	39
2011	Barwa Addax Team	IST; FEA; 4	IST; SPR; 2	**CAT**; **FEA**; 2	CAT; SPR; Ret	MON; FEA; Ret	MON; SPR; 9	VAL; FEA; 2	VAL; SPR; 3	SIL; FEA; 8	SIL; SPR; 3	NÜR; FEA; 6	NÜR; SPR; Ret	HUN; FEA; 4	HUN; SPR; 4	SPA; FEA; Ret	SPA; SPR; 20	MNZ; FEA; 21	MNZ; SPR; 13							5th	49
2012	Caterham Racing	SEP; FEA; 9	SEP; SPR; 4	BHR1; FEA; Ret	BHR1; SPR; 9	**BHR2**; **FEA**; 3	BHR2; SPR; 19	CAT; FEA; 1	CAT; SPR; 6	MON; FEA; 3	MON; SPR; 3	VAL; FEA; 11	VAL; SPR; 6	SIL; FEA; 8	SIL; SPR; 21	**HOC**; **FEA**; 5	HOC; SPR; 2	HUN; FEA; 5	HUN; SPR; 10	SPA; FEA; 5	SPA; SPR; 21	MNZ; FEA; Ret	MNZ; SPR; 10	MRN; FEA; 8	MRN; SPR; 1	6th	160

==== Complete GP2 Asia Series results ====
(key) (Races in bold indicate pole position) (Races in italics indicate fastest lap)

Year	Entrant	1	2	3	4	5	6	7	8	9	10	11	12	DC	Points
2008–09	GFH Team iSport	SHI; FEA; 10	SHI; SPR; DNS	DUB; FEA; 4	DUB; SPR; C	BHR1; FEA; 7	BHR1; SPR; 14	LSL; FEA; 12	LSL; SPR; 8	SEP; FEA; 14	SEP; SPR; 10	BHR2; FEA; 5	BHR2; SPR; 7	12th	11
2009–10	Barwa Addax Team	YMC1; FEA	YMC1; SPR	YMC2; FEA; Ret	YMC2; SPR; 19	BHR1; FEA	BHR1; SPR	BHR2; FEA	BHR2; SPR					34th	0
2011	Barwa Addax Team	YMC; FEA; 5	YMC; SPR; 23	IMO; FEA; 2	IMO; SPR; 3									**3rd**	**16**

=== Complete Formula One results ===
(key) (Races in bold indicate pole position) (Races in italics indicates fastest lap)

Year	Entrant	Chassis	Engine	1	2	3	4	5	6	7	8	9	10	11	12	13	14	15	16	17	18	19	20	WDC	Points
2012	Caterham F1 Team	Caterham CT01	Renault RS27‑2012 2.4 V8	AUS	MAL	CHN; TD	BHR	ESP	MON	CAN	EUR	GBR	GER	HUN	BEL	ITA	SIN	JPN; TD	KOR; TD	IND; TD	ABU; TD	USA	BRA; TD	–	–
2013	Caterham F1 Team	Caterham CT03	Renault RS27‑2013 2.4 V8	AUS; 18	MAL; 15	CHN; 18	BHR; 21	ESP; Ret	MON; 15	CAN; Ret	GBR; 18	GER; 18	HUN; 14	BEL; 16	ITA; 18	SIN; 16	KOR; 15	JPN; Ret	IND; Ret	ABU; 18	USA; 19	BRA; 18		22nd	0
2014	Sauber F1 Team	Sauber C33	Ferrari 059/3 1.6 V6 t	AUS	MAL	BHR; TD	CHN; TD	ESP; TD	MON	CAN	AUT	GBR; TD	GER; TD	HUN	BEL; TD	ITA; TD	SIN	JPN	RUS	USA	BRA	ABU		–	–

=== Complete European Le Mans Series results ===
Year	Entrant	Class	Chassis	Engine	1	2	3	4	5	6	Rank	Points
2016	G-Drive Racing	LMP2	Gibson 015S	Nissan VK45DE 4.5 L V8	SIL; 1	IMO; 2	RBR; 3	LEC; 5	SPA; 5	EST; 1	1st	103
2021	Racing Team Nederland	LMP2	Oreca 07	Gibson GK428 4.2 L V8	CAT	RBR	LEC	MNZ; 13	SPA	ALG	NC†	0†

^{†} As van der Garde was a guest driver, he was ineligible to score points.

=== Complete FIA World Endurance Championship results ===
Year	Entrant	Class	Car	Engine	1	2	3	4	5	6	7	8	9	Rank	Points
2016	G-Drive Racing	LMP2	Gibson 015S	Nissan VK45DE 4.5 L V8	SIL	SPA; 6	LMS; Ret	NÜR	MEX	COA				21st	30
2016	Extreme Speed Motorsports	LMP2	Ligier JS P2	Nissan VK45DE 4.5 L V8							FUJ; 4	SHA	BHR; 5	21st	30
2018–19	Racing Team Nederland	LMP2	Dallara P217	Gibson GK428 4.2 L V8	SPA; 7	LMS; 5	SIL; 5	FUJ; 7	SHA; 5	SEB; 5	SPA; 5	LMS; 5		7th	85
2019–20	Racing Team Nederland	LMP2	Oreca 07	Gibson GK428 4.2 L V8	**SIL**; 3	FUJ; 1	SHA; 5	BHR; 5	COA; 5	SPA; 3	LMS; 6	BHR; 3		6th	130
2021	Racing Team Nederland	LMP2	Oreca 07	Gibson GK428 4.2 L V8	SPA; 4	ALG; 10	MNZ; WD	LMS; 6	BHR; 5	BHR; 6				9th	52
2023	United Autosports	LMP2	Oreca 07	Gibson GK428 4.2 L V8	SEB	ALG; 1	SPA	LMS	MNZ; 4	FUJ	BHR			14th	37

=== Complete 24 Hours of Le Mans results ===
Year	Team	Co-Drivers	Car	Class	Laps	Pos.	Class Pos.
2016	(Russia) G-Drive Racing	(United Kingdom) Jake Dennis (United Kingdom) Simon Dolan	Gibson 015S-Nissan	LMP2	222	DNF	DNF
2018	(Netherlands) Racing Team Nederland	(Netherlands) Jan Lammers (Netherlands) Frits van Eerd	Dallara P217-Gibson	LMP2	356	11th	7th
2019	(Netherlands) Racing Team Nederland	(Netherlands) Nyck de Vries (Netherlands) Frits van Eerd	Dallara P217-Gibson	LMP2	340	26th	15th
2020	(Netherlands) Racing Team Nederland	(Netherlands) Nyck de Vries (Netherlands) Frits van Eerd	Oreca 07-Gibson	LMP2	349	19th	15th
2021	(Netherlands) Racing Team Nederland	(Netherlands) Job van Uitert (Netherlands) Frits van Eerd	Oreca 07-Gibson	LMP2	356	16th	11th
2021	(Netherlands) Racing Team Nederland	(Netherlands) Job van Uitert (Netherlands) Frits van Eerd	Oreca 07-Gibson	LMP2 Pro-Am	356	16th	**2nd**
2023	(France) Graff Racing	(Italy) Roberto Lacorte (France) Patrick Pilet	Oreca 07-Gibson	LMP2	303	37th	16th
2023	(France) Graff Racing	(Italy) Roberto Lacorte (France) Patrick Pilet	Oreca 07-Gibson	LMP2 Pro-Am	303	37th	4th

=== Complete IMSA SportsCar Championship results ===
(key) (Races in bold indicate pole position; races in italics indicate fastest lap)

Year	Entrant	Class	Make	Engine	1	2	3	4	5	6	7	Rank	Points	Ref
2021	Racing Team Nederland	LMP2	Oreca 07	Gibson GK428 4.2 L V8	DAY; 8†	SEB	WGL	WGL	ELK	LGA	PET	NC†	0†	
2022	Racing Team Nederland	LMP2	Oreca 07	Gibson GK428 V8	DAY; 2†	SEB; 2	LGA	MDO	WGL; 3	ELK	PET	15th	676	
2023	TDS Racing	LMP2	Oreca 07	Gibson GK428 4.2 L V8	DAY; 4†	SEB; 8	LGA; 4	WGL; 4	ELK; 2	IMS; 5	PET; 2	4th	1832	

^{†} Points only counted towards the Michelin Endurance Cup, and not the overall LMP2 Championship.

== Personal life ==
In December 2013, Van der Garde married his long-time girlfriend Denise Boekhoorn, daughter of Dutch businessman and investor Marcel Boekhoorn, at a ceremony in Zwolle, Netherlands.

== Notes ==
Sporting positions
Preceded by Álvaro Parente	Formula Renault 3.5 Series; Champion; 2008	Succeeded by Bertrand Baguette
Preceded by Jon Lancaster; Björn Wirdheim; Gary Hirsch	European Le Mans Series; LMP2 Champion; 2016; With: Simon Dolan & Harry Tincknell	Succeeded by Memo Rojas; Leo Roussel
