= Caterham CT01 =

2012 Formula One racing car

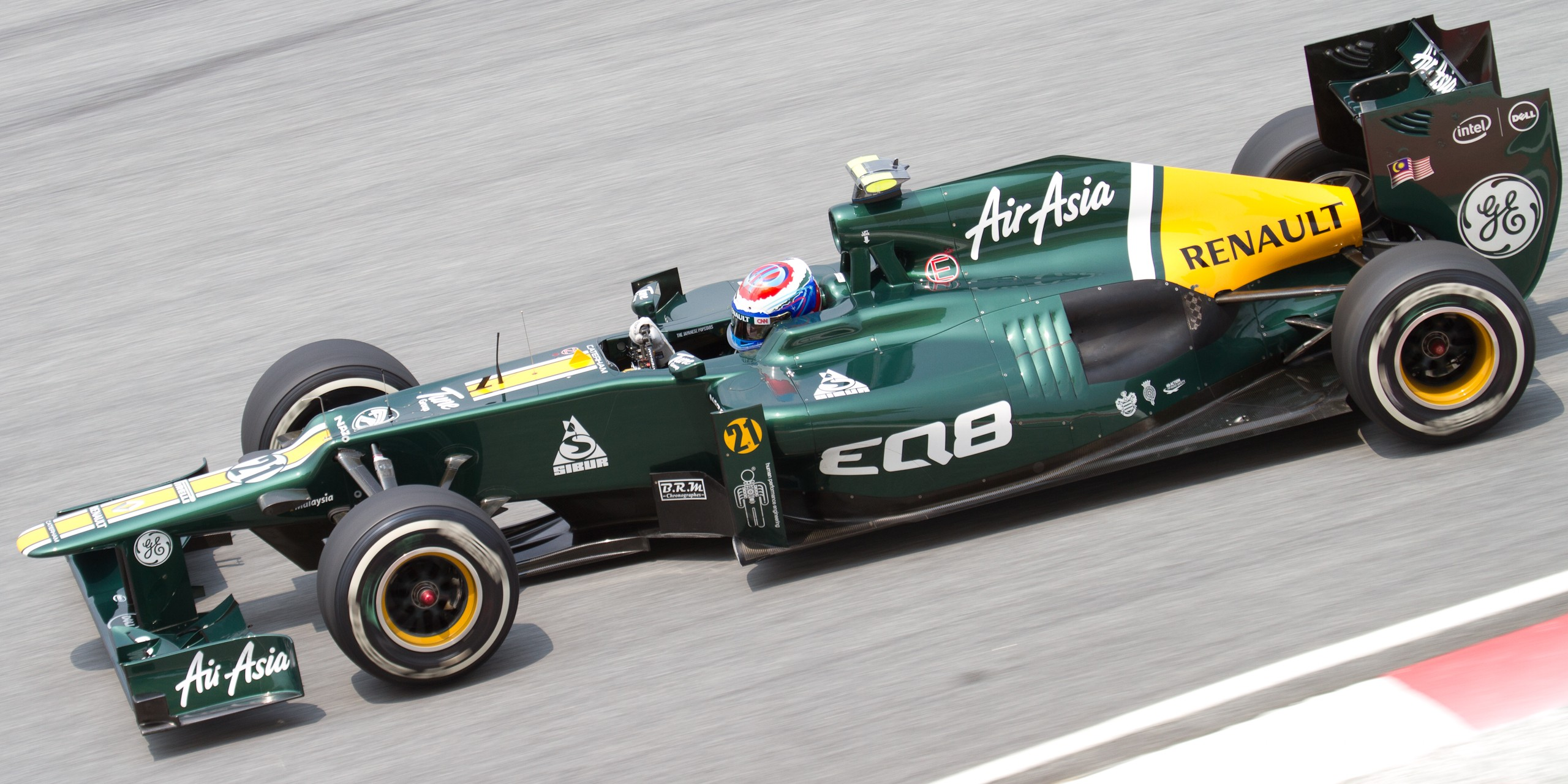
- Vitaly Petrov driving the CT01 at the Malaysian Grand Prix
- Category: Formula One
- Constructor: Caterham
- Designers: Mike Gascoyne (Chief Technical Officer); Mark Smith (Technical Director); John Iley (Performance Director); Elliot Dason-Barber (Head of Vehicle Dynamics and R&D); Lewis Butler (Chief Designer); Marianne Hinson (Head of Aerodynamics)
- Predecessor: Lotus T128
- Successor: Caterham CT03

Technical specifications
- Chassis: Carbon-fibre monocoque.
- Suspension (front): Pushrod, inboard springs.
- Suspension (rear): Pullrod, inboard springs.
- Engine: Renault RS27-2012 2,400 cc (146.5 cu in) 90° V8 DOHC, limited to 18,000 RPM with KERS mid-mounted
- Transmission: Red Bull Technologies Seven-speed semi-automatic gearbox with reverse gear.
- Weight: 640 kg (1,411.0 lb) (incl. driver, tank empty)
- Fuel: Total
- Lubricants: Total
- Tyres: Pirelli P Zero (dry), Cinturato (wet); BBS Wheels (front and rear): 13"

Competition history
- Notable entrants: Caterham F1 Team
- Notable drivers: 20. (Finland) Heikki Kovalainen; 21. (Russia) Vitaly Petrov
- Debut: 2012 Australian Grand Prix
- Last event: 2012 Brazilian Grand Prix
Races	Wins	Podiums	Poles	F/Laps
20	0	0	0	0

The Caterham CT01 (originally known as the Lotus T129) is a Formula One racing car produced by the British-based Caterham F1 Team which competed in the 2012 Formula One season. The car, designed under the leadership of the team's technical director Mike Gascoyne, chief designer Lewis Butler and head of aerodynamics Marianne Hinson, was the third car to be produced by the team and the first to carry the team's new name, following their renaming from Team Lotus at the end of 2011. The CT01 was the first car launched for the 2012 season, when an online launch initially planned for 26 January, was cancelled and the car was released a day earlier instead. The car was driven by Heikki Kovalainen and Vitaly Petrov, who replaced Jarno Trulli after the first test at Jerez.

== Design ==
The CT01 is the first car the team has built that features KERS. After a disappointing first half of the season where the team failed to score any points, the team announced before the British Grand Prix that several upgrades would be implemented for the next Grand Prix.

== Season review ==
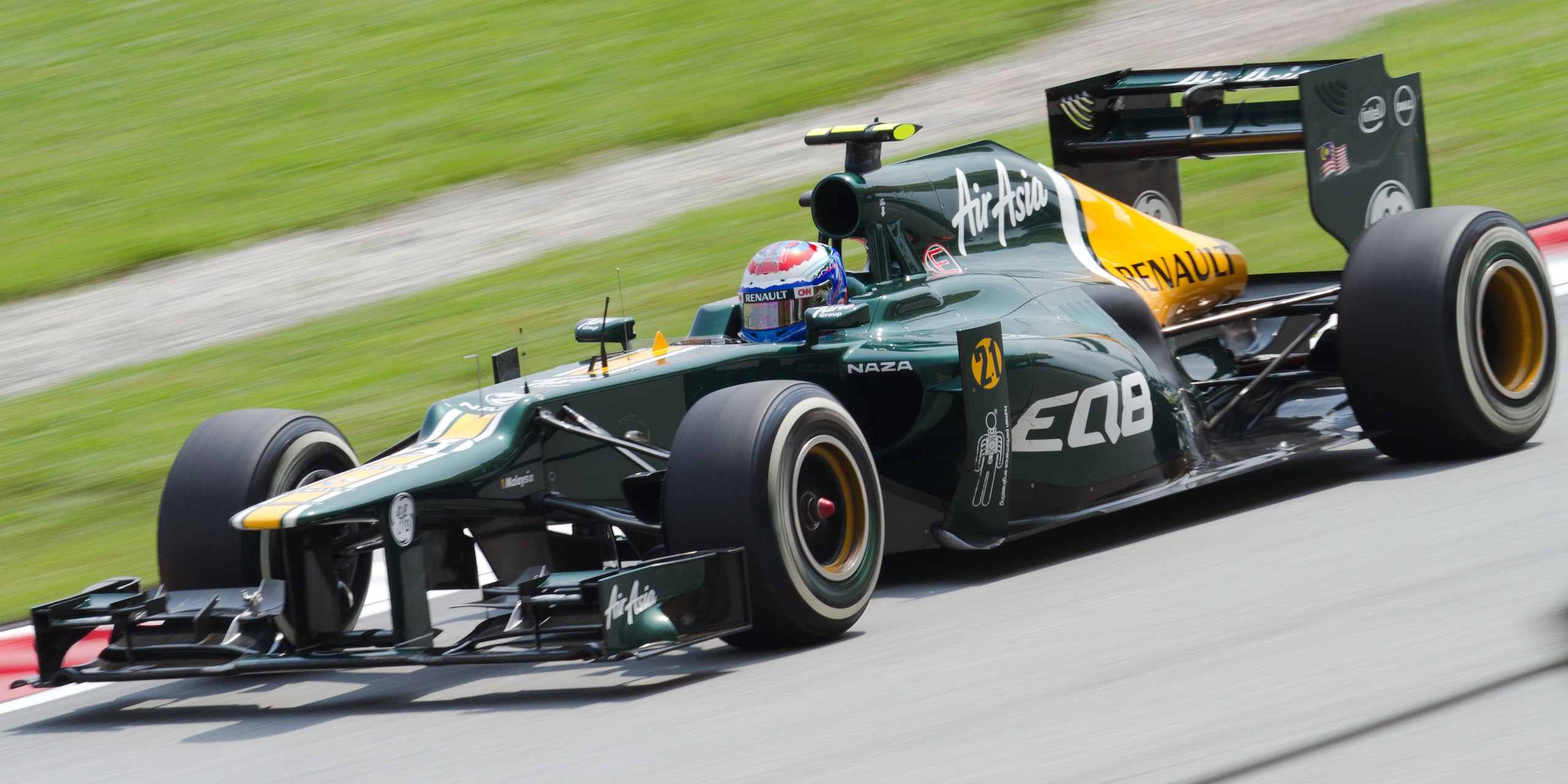
Petrov during FP1 in Malaysia.

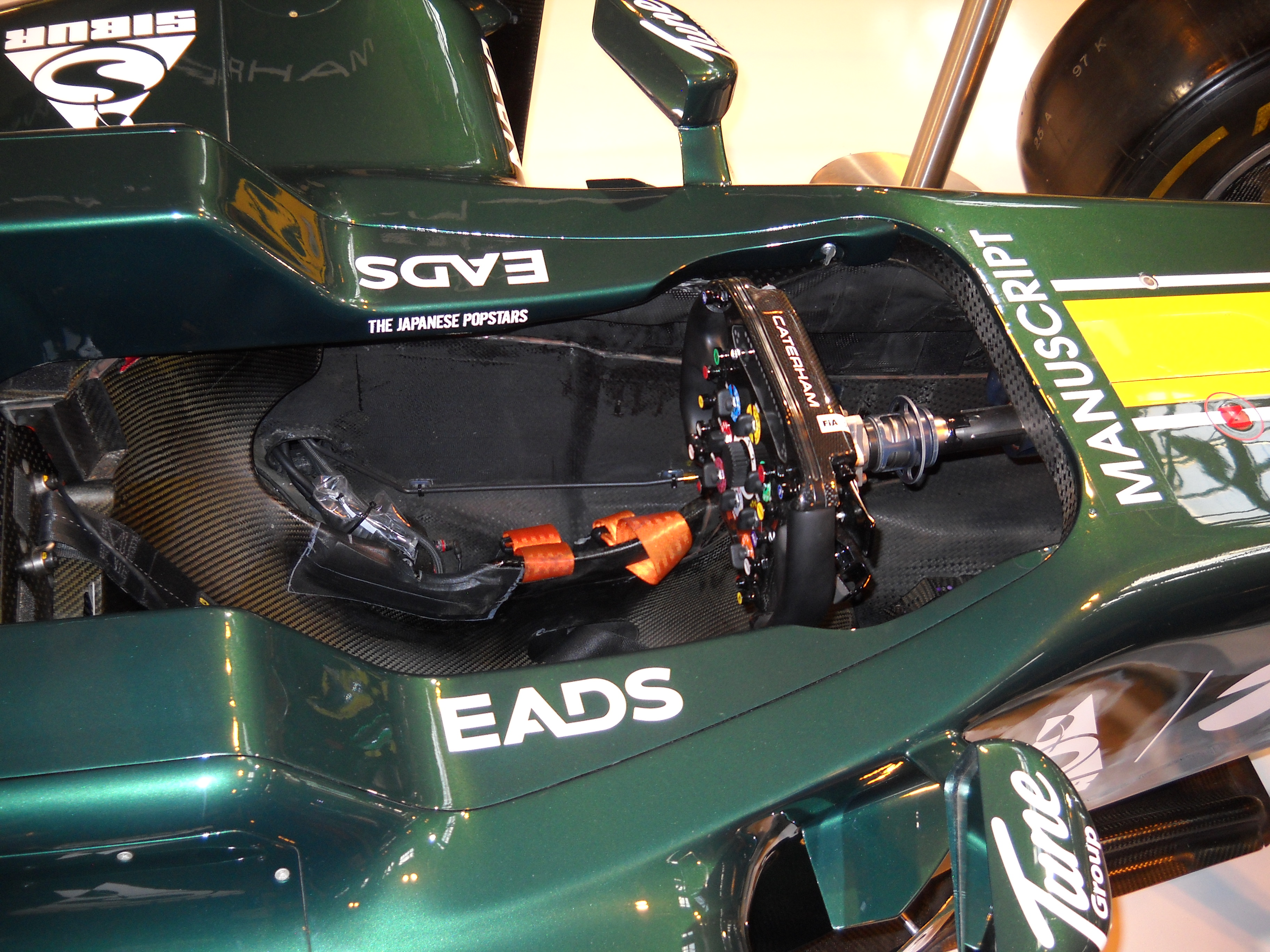
The CT01's cockpit.

The team started the year in Australia where Kovalainen and Petrov qualified the new CT01 in 19th and 20th respectively, albeit, over two seconds off the pace of the Q1 pacesetter. About halfway through the race, Petrov retired the car with steering issues on the start/finish straight causing a safety car period; Kovalainen later retired with suspension failure. At the next race in Malaysia, the team repeated its qualifying performance of 19th and 20th on a rain soaked track, where it became apparent the team still had the edge over the Marussias and HRTs, as it had last season. The car appeared to have made some gains on the midfield too, with Kovalainen only 0.02 seconds behind Toro Rosso driver Jean-Éric Vergne in qualifying. After a race full of heavy rain, safety cars periods and a red flag, the team managed to bring home both cars home for the first time in the season with Petrov in 16th and Kovalainen in 18th. For the third race in a row, in China, Kovalainen and Petrov qualified in 19th and 20th. Petrov managed to bring the car home in 18th while Kovalainen finished as the last of the cars still running, 2 laps down on his teammate.

The Bahrain Grand Prix was an improvement for the team, with Kovalainen managing to qualify the car in 16th, making it into Q2 for the first time in 2012 ahead of Michael Schumacher, Pastor Maldonado, and Vergne. Petrov qualified in 20th place for the fourth time in the first four races before finishing the race in 16th. Kovalainen finished one place behind this after a first lap puncture due to a collision with Daniel Ricciardo. The two cars were initially in 19th and 20th again in Spain, but both gained a place due to Lewis Hamilton's penalty. Petrov out-qualified Kovalainen for the first time in the season. Kovalainen achieved a better race result than Petrov as the pair finished the race in 16th and 17th places. At Monaco, the team were hoping that the lack of straight line speed on the circuit would help their chances at getting the team's first points. Kovalainen and Petrov qualified in 18th and 19th respectively due to Sergio Pérez not setting a time, and due to Maldonando's grid penalty, they were moved up a further place each to 17th and 18th. On lap 16 Petrov pulled into the pits for a routine tyre change but retired with electrical failure. Kovalainen was twelfth in the race, attempting to hold off Button and Pérez before he was involved in a collision with the Mexican which broke his front wing forcing him to pit. He only lost one place and still achieved the team's best result of the season so far with thirteenth. The result put the team back into tenth in the Constructors' standings ahead of Marussia and HRT.

For the next race in Canada, it was business as usual, with the cars qualifying in 18th and 19th places, with Kovalainen ahead of Petrov again, and then finishing the race in the same positions as they started. The qualifying at the European Grand Prix was a good result for the team, as Kovalainen managed to make it into Q2 by merit ahead of Vergne and the Red Bull of Mark Webber and eventually qualified 16th. Meanwhile, Petrov qualified down in 20th. The team relished a highly competitive race pace for the race itself with Petrov running in tenth for a good deal of the race and Kovalainen not far behind. However, the team faced two clashes with Toro Rosso's with Vergne on lap 27 attempting to pass around the outside of turn 12 using DRS, but he pulled ahead and his rear right wheel touched Kovalainen's front left, causing both to suffer immediate punctures. Kovalainen managed to continue after pitting for a new set of tyres while Vergne retired. Meanwhile, Petrov had an incident with Ricciardo while running in 11th place where they both came into turn 14, and Ricciardo going around the outside got clipped by the front of Petrov and was put into a spin while Petrov continued without a front wing before diving into the pit. Even with these clashes with other drivers, the evident pace was still there as Petrov managed to match the team's best finish in Monaco with 13th place and Kovalainen following him across the line in 14th.

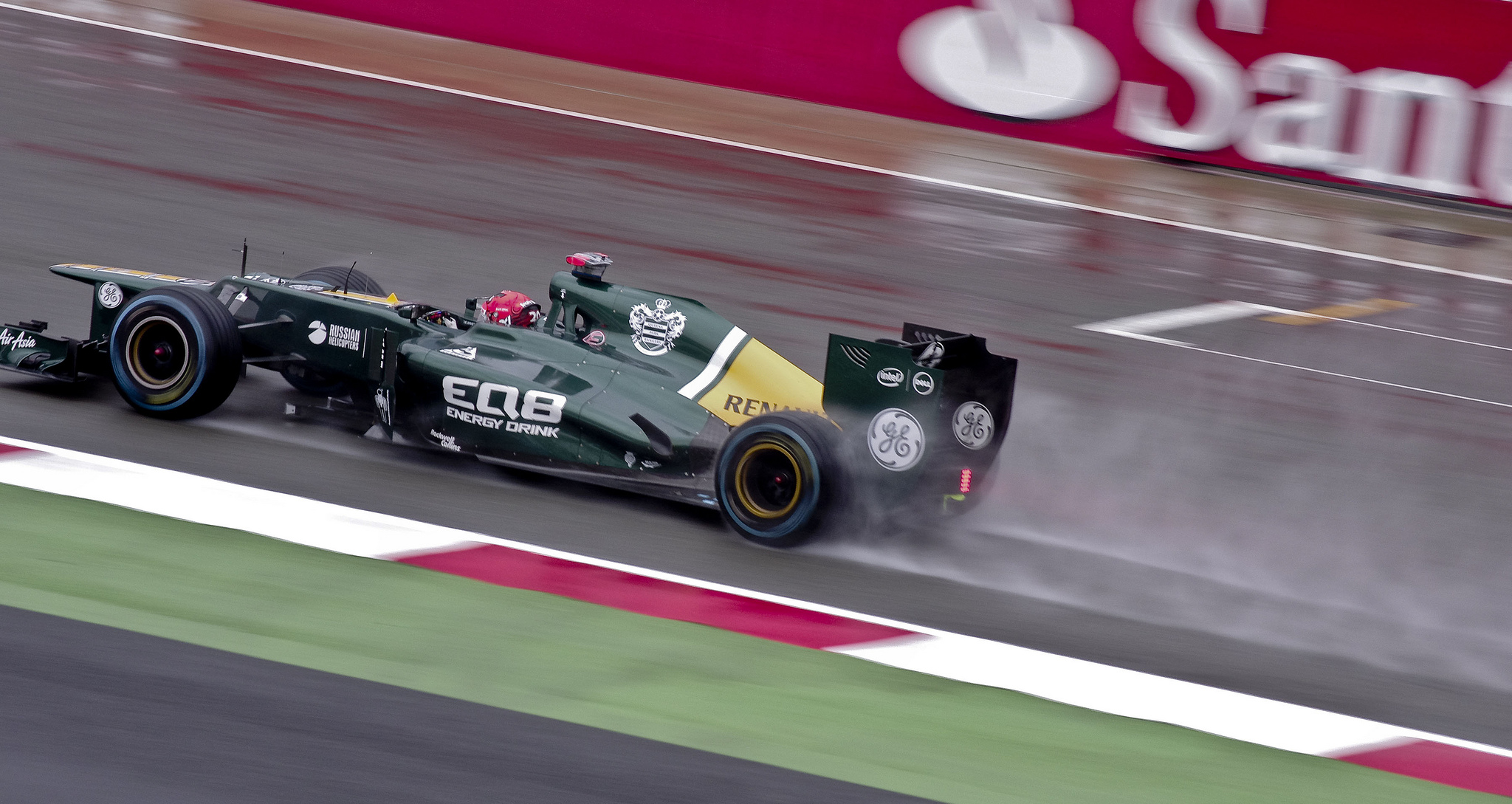
Kovalainen during a wet Free Practice at the British Grand Prix.

The British Grand Prix held a lot of expectation for the team because they brought many updates for the car that would increase their chances of running as well as they did in Valencia with new rear bodywork and a new exhaust layout. Wet practice sessions, however, provided difficulty in finding useful results to analyse. They team qualified in 19th and 20th much like the rest of the year, with the difference being that it was Petrov who out-qualified his teammate for the second time that season. About 20 minutes before the race had started, on his way around the track to line up on the grid, Petrov's car suffered terminal engine failure leaving the team to scramble onto the track and push his car halfway around the track to get it back into the pits. Much work was done on the car but it was eventually decided that he would be unable to start the race. This left Kovalainen the sole Caterham on track, where he managed to finish in 17th just behind Maldonado.

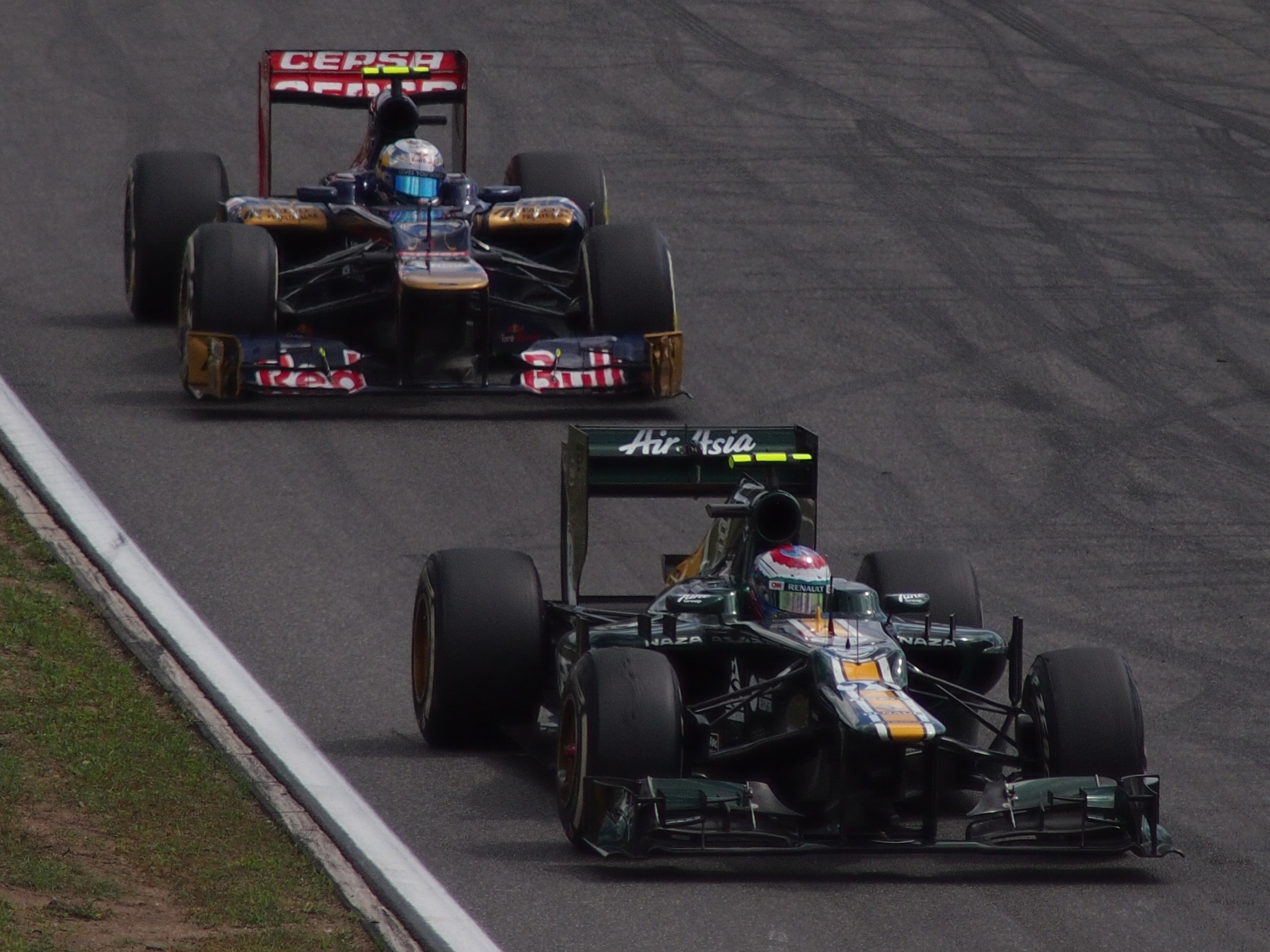
Petrov at the German Grand Prix showing that the car could regularly fight for position with the Toro Rossos.

At the German Grand Prix round in Hockenheim, the team had again brought additional updates to the car after Britain, but the practice sessions were run in similar conditions. The cars managed to qualify in their usual 19th and 20th grid slots with Kovalainen ahead of Petrov again, but due to grid place penalties, Kovalainen was moved up three places into 16th while Petrov moved two places into 18th. At the start of the race, small contact between Bruno Senna and Felipe Massa caused bits of carbon fibre to fly all over the place causing Kovalainen to drive wide off the first corner deep into the run off area leaving him far down the field when he rejoined. Petrov finished in 16th as he managed to keep both the Williams of Senna and the Lotus of Romain Grosjean at bay while Kovalainen finished a further lap down in 19th.

For the Hungarian Grand Prix, the team once again put the cars on the tenth row of the grid but Kovalainen showed pace with the car as he only qualified just under four tenths of a second down on Ricciardo in 19th position with Petrov behind him in 20th by over half a second after finding traffic on his flying lap. After a tough race battling with the Toro Rossos and often racing ahead of the pair throughout, Kovalainen eventually brought the car home just behind Vergne and Ricciardo in 17th position, beating Petrov who finished 19th behind the Sauber of Kamui Kobayashi. They had both opted to use different strategies for the race with Kovalainen starting on the softer compound with Petrov on the medium tyre, which meant this was only the second time of the year where Kovalainen finished ahead of the Russian driver while they were both still running.

At the Brazilian Grand Prix, Petrov’s 11th-place finish gave Caterham the opportunity to overtake Marussia and secure 10th place, as well as a share of the prize money under the Concorde Agreement. According to Mike Gascoyne, Petrov’s position was worth £7 million.

== Sponsorship and livery ==
As the team were previously known as Team Lotus from the previous season, they went into the 2012 season with subtle livery changes by removing the white-green stripe on the rear wing while the front and rear section of the car were kept as well as the green paint tone. A Malaysian flag was displayed on the rear wing at the Malaysian Grand Prix.

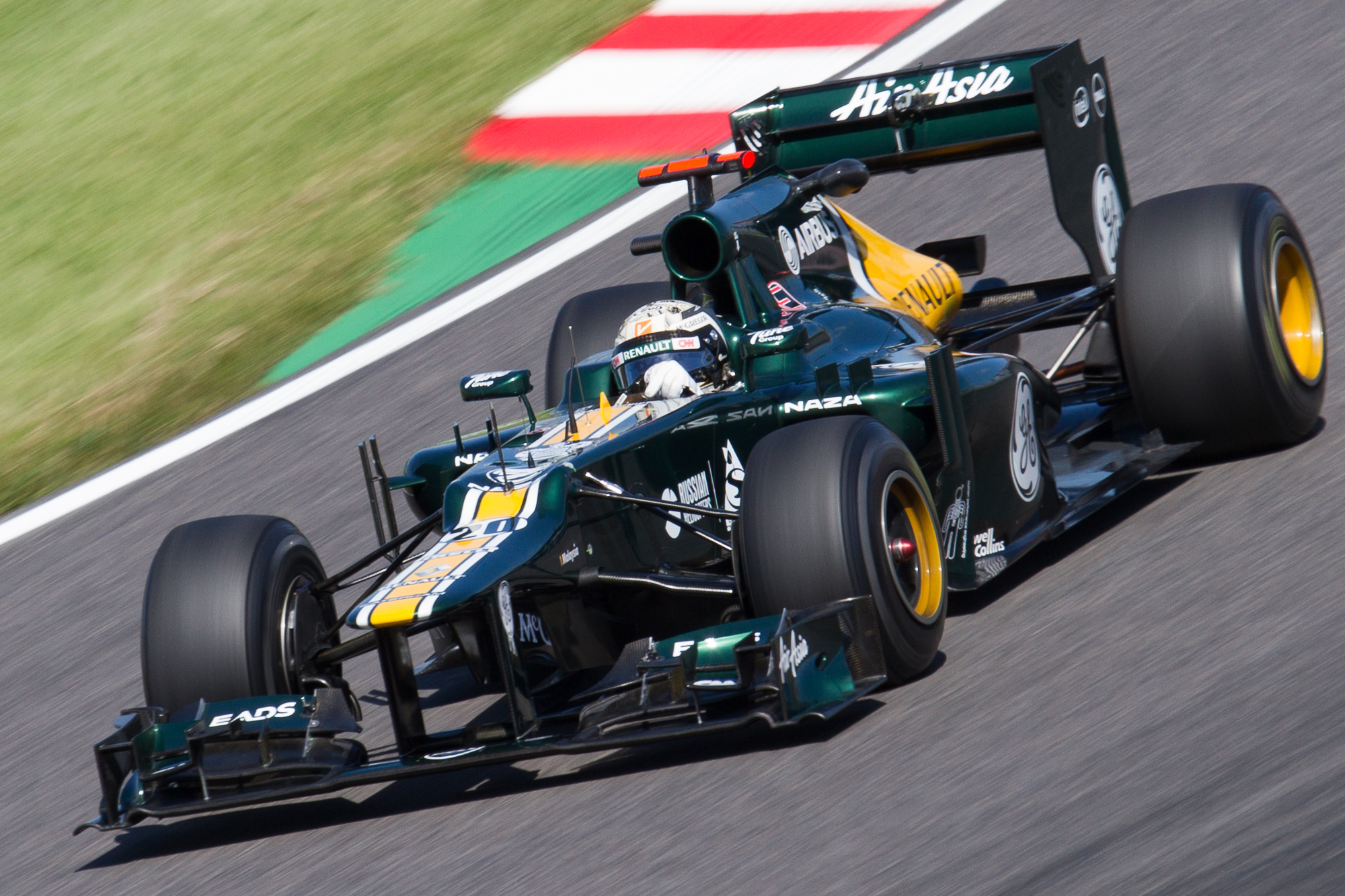
Reserve driver Giedo van der Garde testing the CT01 during the Japanese Grand Prix.

From the Australian Grand Prix onwards, the logo of the football club Queens Park Rangers was visible on the cars' front bargeboard and under the air intake; it then moved to the engine cover at the Monaco Grand Prix, and finally, from the Belgian Grand Prix for the remainder of the season, it was placed on the nose section of the car.

== Complete Formula One results ==
(key) (results in bold indicate pole position; results in italics indicate fastest lap)

Year	Entrant	Engine	Tyres	Drivers	1	2	3	4	5	6	7	8	9	10	11	12	13	14	15	16	17	18	19	20	Points	WCC
2012	Caterham	Renault RS27-2012	**P**		AUS	MAL	CHN	BHR	ESP	MON	CAN	EUR	GBR	GER	HUN	BEL	ITA	SIN	JPN	KOR	IND	ABU	USA	BRA	0	10th
2012	Caterham	Renault RS27-2012	**P**	Heikki Kovalainen	Ret	18	23	17	16	13	18	14	17	19	17	17	14	15	15	17	18	13	18	14	0	10th
2012	Caterham	Renault RS27-2012	**P**	Vitaly Petrov	Ret	16	18	16	17	Ret	19	13	DNS	16	19	14	15	19	17	16	17	16	17	11	0	10th
