= Caterham CT05 =

2014 Formula One racing car

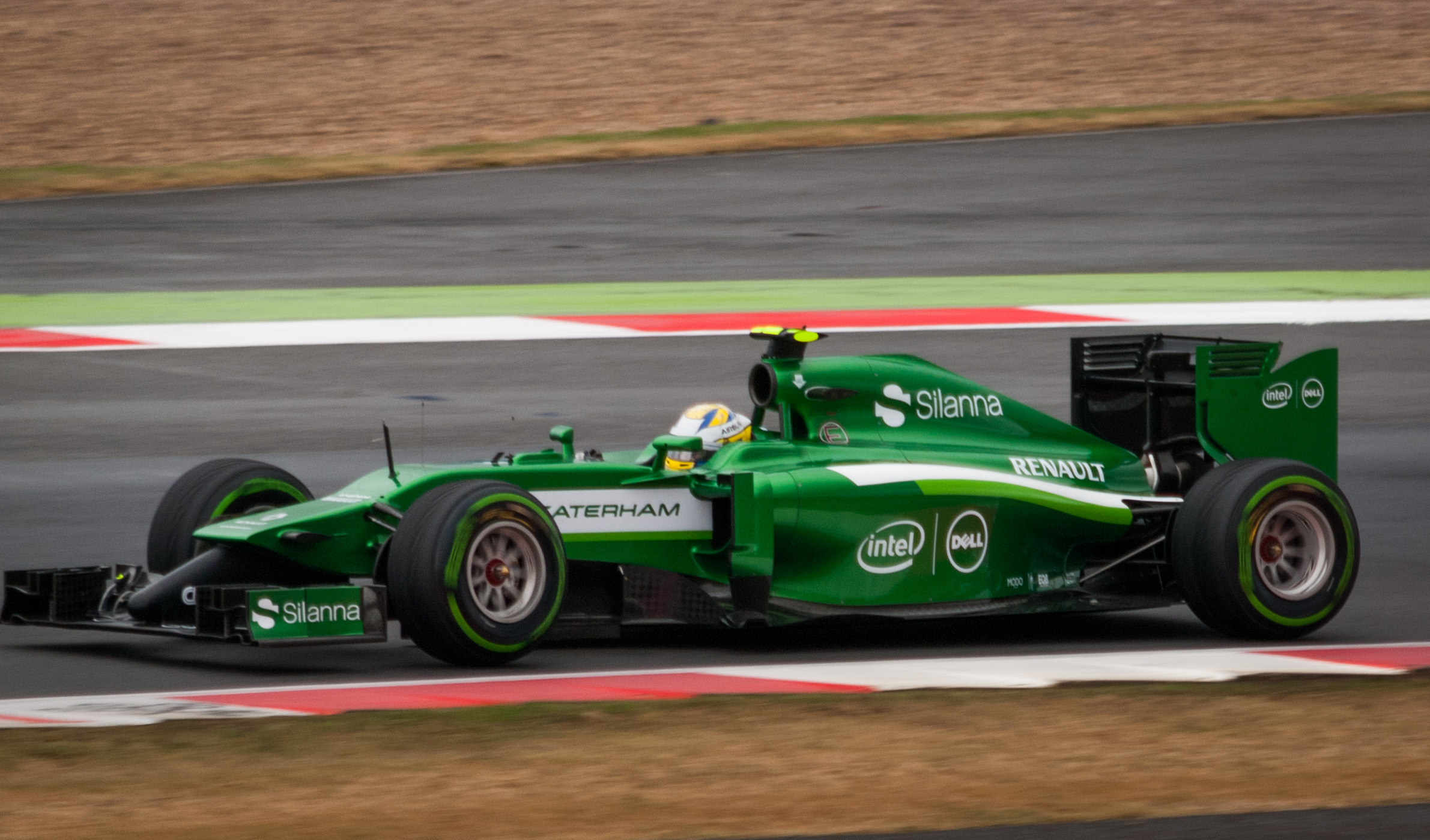
- Marcus Ericsson driving the CT05 at the British Grand Prix
- Category: Formula One
- Constructor: Caterham
- Designers: Mark Smith (Technical Director); John Iley (Performance Director); Lewis Butler (Chief Designer); Keith Barclay (Deputy Chief Designer); Elliot Dason-Barber (Head of Vehicle Dynamics and R&D); Hari Roberts (Head of Aerodynamics)
- Predecessor: Caterham CT03

Technical specifications
- Chassis: Carbon fibre monocoque
- Suspension (front): Twin non-parallel wishbone, pullrod actuated
- Suspension (rear): As front
- Engine: Renault Energy F1-2014 1.6 L (98 cu in) V6, turbo with ERS, mid-mounted
- Electric motor: Motor Generator Unit–Kinetic; Motor Generator Unit–Heat
- Transmission: Red Bull Technology 8 speed gearbox semi-automatic
- Battery: Renault lithium-ion batteries solution
- Power: 600 hp (447 kW) + 160 hp (119 kW) with MGU-K
- Fuel: Total Excellium
- Lubricants: Total Quartz 9000
- Tyres: Pirelli P Zero (dry), Cinturato (wet)

Competition history
- Notable entrants: Caterham F1 Team
- Notable drivers: 9. (Sweden) Marcus Ericsson; 10. (Japan) Kamui Kobayashi; 45. (Germany) André Lotterer; 46. (United Kingdom) Will Stevens
- Debut: 2014 Australian Grand Prix
- Last event: 2014 Abu Dhabi Grand Prix
Races	Wins	Podiums	Poles	F/Laps
17	0	0	0	0

The Caterham CT05 is a Formula One racing car that competed in the 2014 Formula One season. It was the last Caterham F1 car before the team folded prior to the start of the 2015 season.

The car was driven by debutant Marcus Ericsson and Kamui Kobayashi who returned to Formula One after a season driving in the FIA World Endurance Championship with AF Corse. André Lotterer replaced Kobayashi for the Belgian Grand Prix, and Will Stevens replaced Ericsson for the Abu Dhabi Grand Prix. Alongside the drivers, Caterham also operated a driver programme which expanded in mid 2014 when Christijan Albers took over as CEO. Drivers who were involved with CT05 either through practice runs or development included Robin Frijns, Alexander Rossi, Julian Leal, Rio Haryanto and Nathanaël Berthon.

== Development ==
=== Design and technical ===
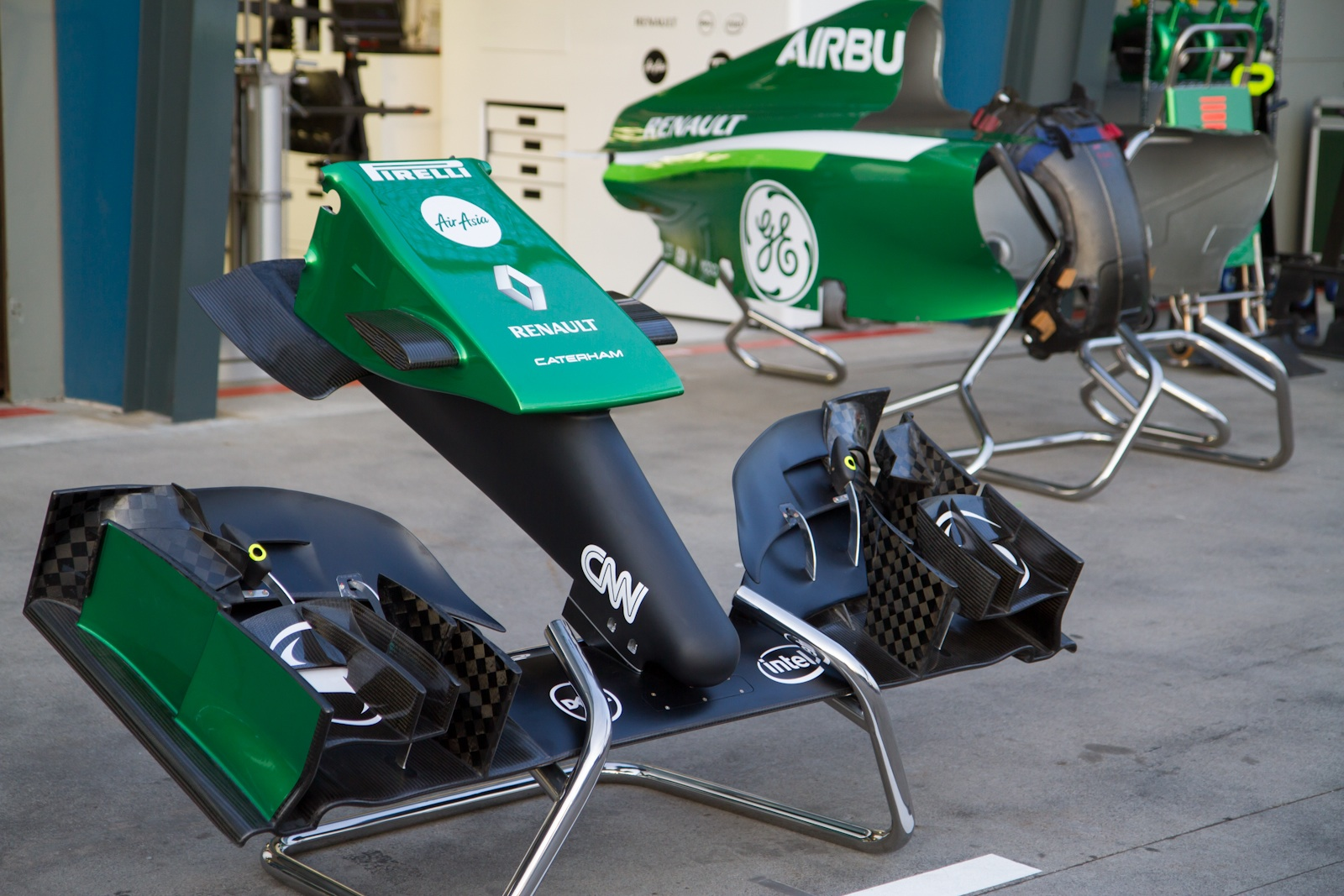
The CT05 initially featured a unique and extensively discussed nosecone

The CT05 was designed by Mark Smith, Lewis Butler and Hari Roberts at the new Leafield Technical Centre. The engine was the new Renault Energy F1-2014, and the gearbox from Red Bull Technology. Ahead of 2014, the team had struck an agreement with Toyota Motorsport to utilise their wind tunnel for testing and development, alongside upgraded CFD capacity at the new base.

=== Launch and testing ===
The CT05 was launched during pre-season testing in Jerez in late January 2014. Marcus Ericsson drove the new car first on track. The car had a rear and wing design similar to Red Bull Racing and a unique nose cone. By August, the controversial nose design was adapted slightly to a more rounded design.

=== Sponsorship and livery ===
The CT05 featured a new livery design for the team, a bold metallic green set off with flashes of white, yellow and black. Airbus, GE and Dell Computers Intel took major sponsorship on the car. A Malaysian flag was displayed on the front wing at the Malaysian Grand Prix.

At the Monaco Grand Prix, the sides of the cars feature the logo of the football club Queens Park Rangers, along with the text: “Congratulations – back to where we belong.”

After the team missed two races due to funding, the final race of the season saw a car adorned with sponsors who had helped the CT05 reach the final race of the year.

== Racing history ==
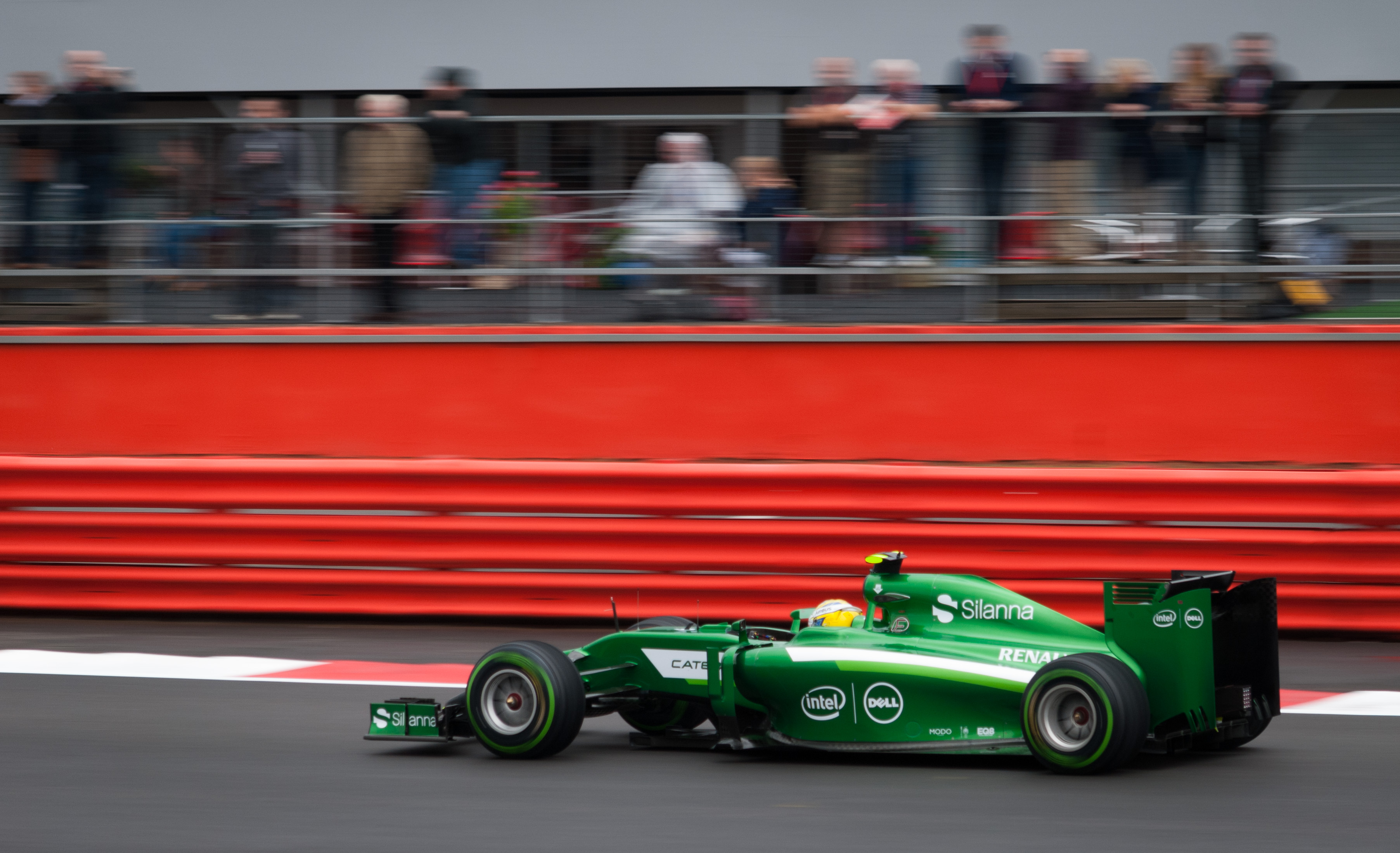
Ericsson at the British Grand Prix

The car performed poorly throughout the season. At the first Grand Prix of the year in Australia, both drivers retired. Indeed, the CT05 would chalk up 12 retirements in total, and three Grands Prix where neither car finished.

The best result of the season was in Monaco, for Marcus Ericsson who finished in 11th place.

André Lotterer took over driving the CT05 at Belgium as Kobayashi, with no specific reason given. He would ultimately retire from the race. Kobayashi returned to the car, and in Singapore he failed to start the race as his brakes failed on the formation lap.

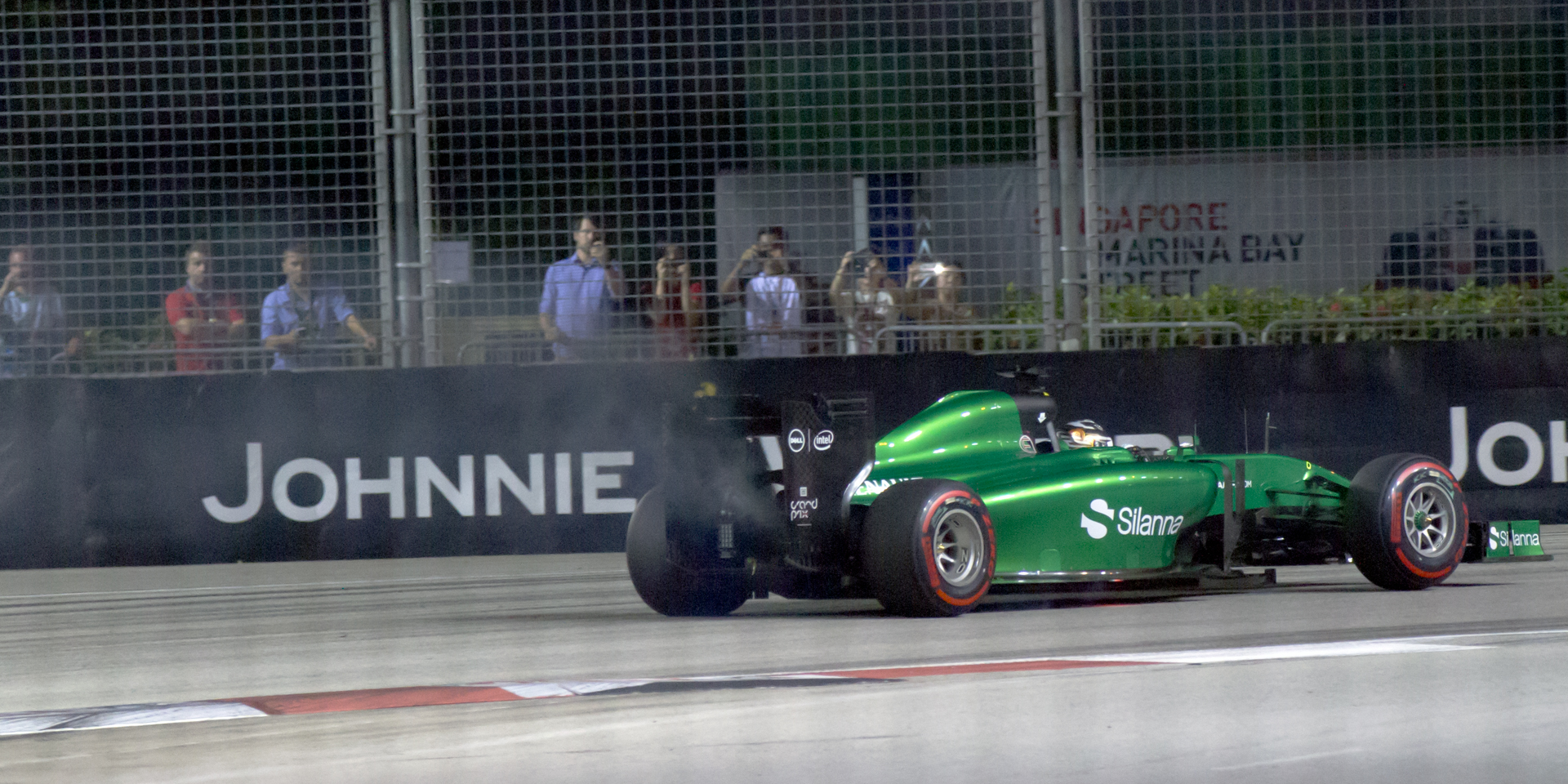
The CT05 is noted for its unreliability. Pictured is Kobayashi failing to start the Singapore Grand Prix with an oil pressure issue.

Financial difficulties hit the team and they failed to field either CT05 at the United States or Brazilian Grand Prix. However, they returned for the final round in Abu Dhabi where Will Stevens drove in place of Ericsson before folding.

== Caterham CT07 ==
After the team was sold to new owners, they began designing the Caterham CT07. In August 2014, the team had a wind tunnel model of the CT07 completed and tested. The car would have had a different front end and they did not continue with the futuristic looking beak coin or better known anteater shape. The front fender was different. The flaps were more streamlined, which seemed to improve the airflow to the rear. The rear of the CT07, the car, has not been changed much. The rear fender had more or less the same features as the CT05. The side fenders seemed to have been slightly changed to achieve better airflow. In addition, the CT07's engine cover was straighter.

== Complete Formula One results ==
(key)

Year	Entrant	Engine	Tyres	Drivers	1	2	3	4	5	6	7	8	9	10	11	12	13	14	15	16	17	18	19	Pts	WCC
2014	Caterham F1 Team	Renault Energy F1-2014	P		AUS	MAL	BHR	CHN	ESP	MON	CAN	AUT	GBR	GER	HUN	BEL	ITA	SIN	JPN	RUS	USA	BRA	ABU‡	0	11th
2014	Caterham F1 Team	Renault Energy F1-2014	P	Marcus Ericsson	Ret	14	Ret	20	20	11	Ret	18	Ret	18	Ret	17	19	15	17	19				0	11th
2014	Caterham F1 Team	Renault Energy F1-2014	P	Kamui Kobayashi	Ret	13	15	18	Ret	13	Ret	16	15	16	Ret		17	DNS	19	Ret			Ret	0	11th
2014	Caterham F1 Team	Renault Energy F1-2014	P	André Lotterer												Ret								0	11th
2014	Caterham F1 Team	Renault Energy F1-2014	P	Will Stevens																			17	0	11th

‡ — Teams and drivers scored double points at the Abu Dhabi Grand Prix
