= Caterham CT03 =

2013 Formula One racing car

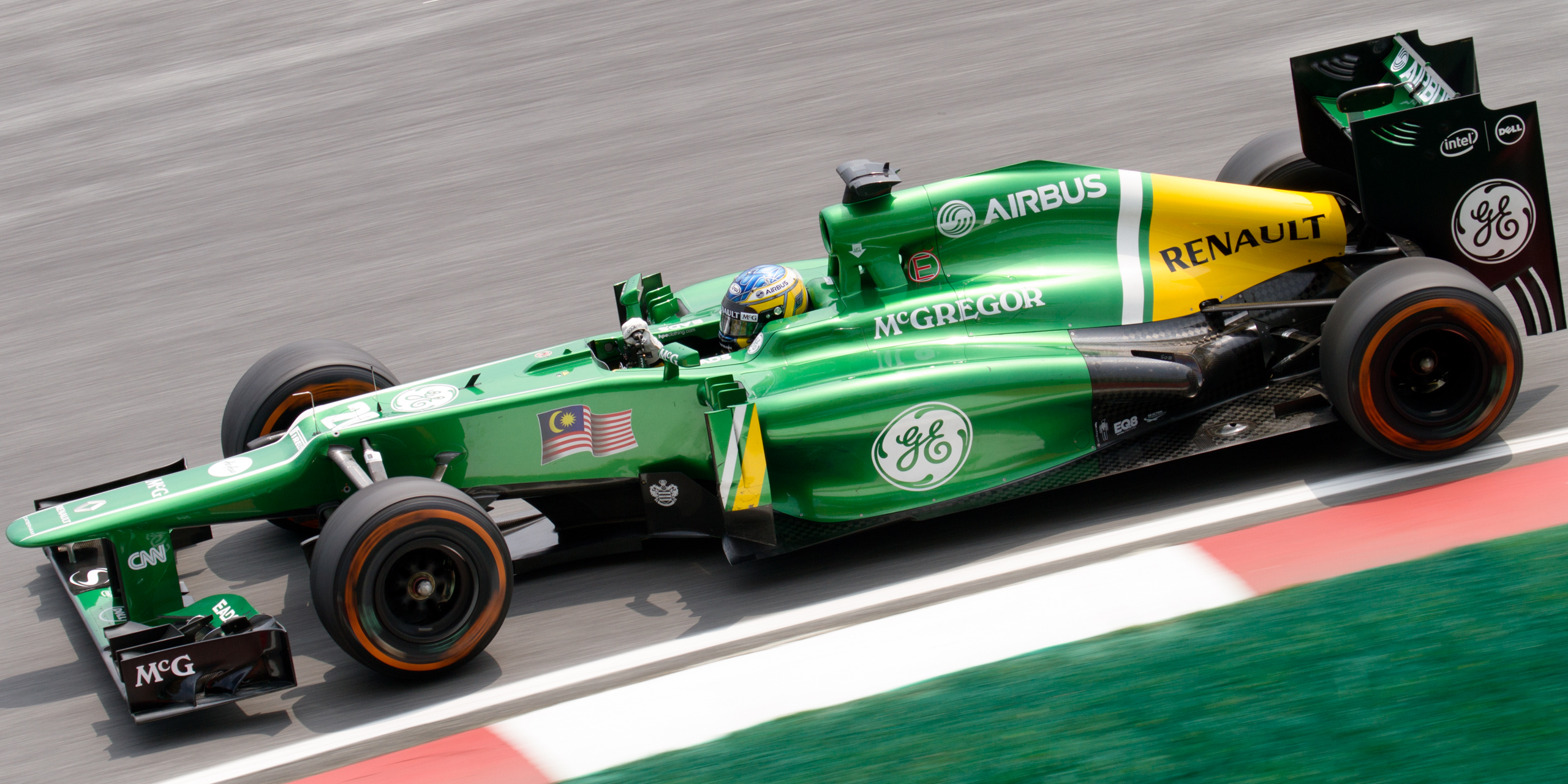
- Charles Pic driving the CT03 at the Malaysian Grand Prix
- Category: Formula One
- Constructor: Caterham
- Designers: Mark Smith (Technical Director); John Iley (Performance Director); Lewis Butler (Chief Designer); Keith Barclay (Deputy Chief Designer); Elliot Dason-Barber (Head of Vehicle Dynamics and R&D); Marianne Hinson (Head of Aerodynamics)
- Predecessor: Caterham CT01
- Successor: Caterham CT05

Technical specifications
- Chassis: Carbon-fibre monocoque
- Suspension (front): Twin non-parallel wishbone, pushrod actuated
- Suspension (rear): Twin non-parallel wishbone, pullrod actuated
- Length: Over 5,000 mm (197 in)
- Width: 1,800 mm (71 in)
- Height: 950 mm (37 in)
- Wheelbase: Over 3,000 mm (118 in)
- Engine: Renault RS27-2013 2,400 cc (146 cu in) V8 (90°) naturally aspirated + KERS mid-mounted
- Electric motor: Red Bull Technology KERS recovered by MGU-K
- Transmission: Red Bull Technology 7-speed + 1 reverse semi-automatic gearbox
- Power: 750 hp (559 kW) + 80 hp (60 kW) KERS
- Weight: 642 kg (1,415 lb) including driver
- Fuel: Total Excellium 94.25% unleaded gasoline + 5.75% biofuel
- Lubricants: Total Quartz 9000
- Brakes: Hitco carbon brake discs, Carbon Industrie pads and AP Racing 6-piston calipers
- Tyres: Pirelli P Zero (dry) and Cinturato (wet); BBS wheels

Competition history
- Notable entrants: Caterham F1 Team
- Notable drivers: 20. (France) Charles Pic; 21. (Netherlands) Giedo van der Garde
- Debut: 2013 Australian Grand Prix
- Last event: 2013 Brazilian Grand Prix
Races	Wins	Podiums	Poles	F/Laps
19	0	0	0	0

The Caterham CT03 is a Formula One racing car designed by Mark Smith and Lewis Butler for the Caterham F1 team. It was used during the 2013 Formula One season, where it was driven by Charles Pic and Giedo van der Garde. The car was unveiled on the eve of testing for the 2013 season at the Circuito de Jerez.

== Design ==
The first chassis was assembled in early October 2012, completed on 30 January and launched on 5 February. The CT03 aroused controversy during pre-season testing. Lotus technical director James Allison observed details of the car's exhaust outlet that he believed contravened Article 5.8.4 of the technical regulations, that prohibits the use of bodywork within a defined area with respect to the exhaust outlet. The FIA later deemed this system to be illegal. After driving the car during FP1 at Bahrain, Heikki Kovalainen stated the car was basically the previous year's car with nothing done to it.

After the initial three races of the season the CT03 received a major upgrade to improve handling and performance. The most noticeable part of this was the introduction of a vanity panel over the stepped-nose. Later in the season the vanity panel was removed again and the car was raced for the rest of the season without it.

== Season summary ==
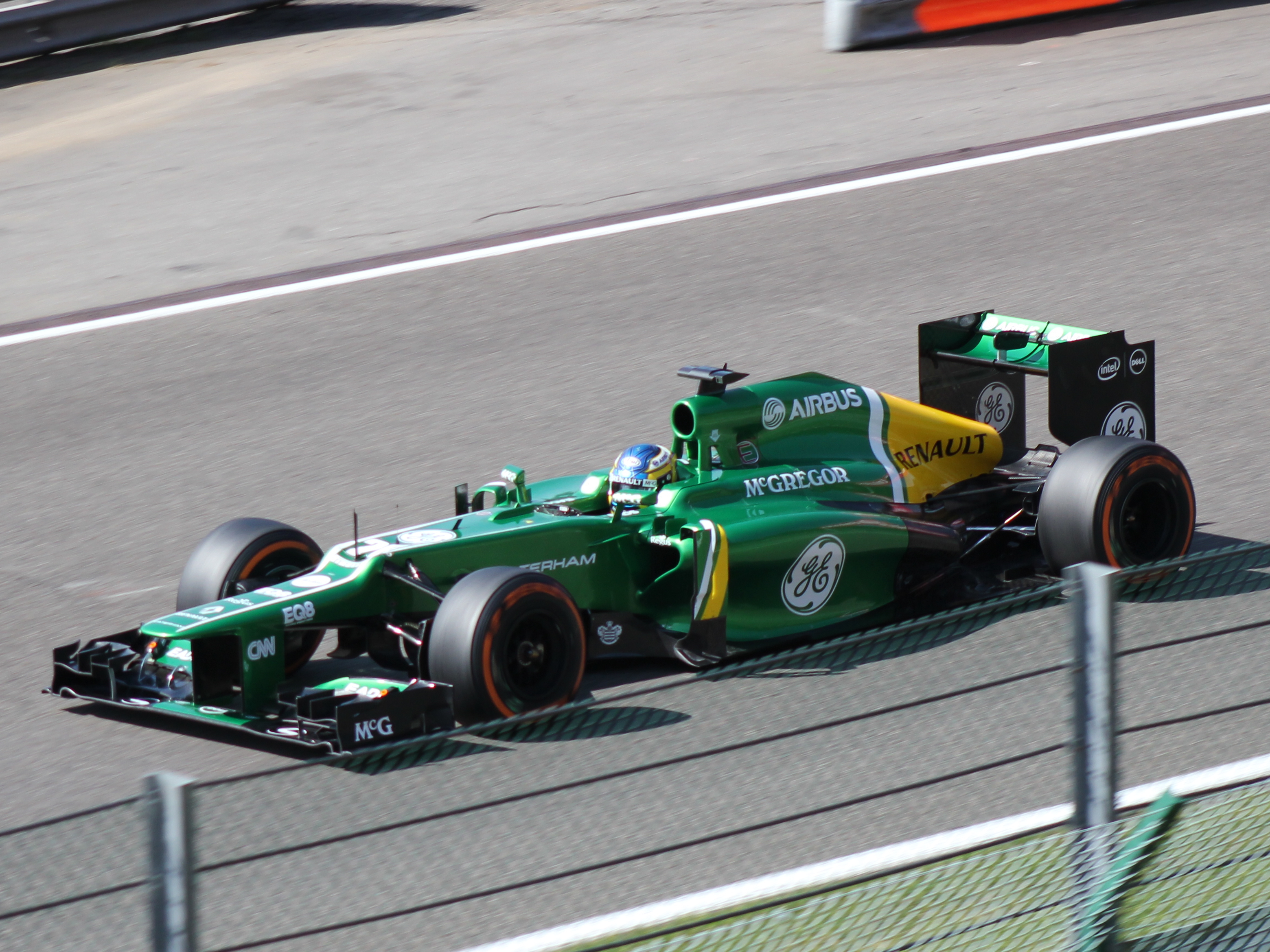
Van der Garde at the Belgian Grand Prix

Caterham were unable to score any points in 2013 and finished the season in 11th in the Constructors' Championship. The team achieved their highest finishing positions with 14th-places in Malaysia, the Hungarian Grand Prix, and the Korean Grand Prix.

== Sponsorship and livery ==
Caterham went into the 2013 season with livery changes. The white-yellow-white stripe in the front section was replaced with solid green with white accents as Caterham F1's main colour while the white-yellow stripe on the rear section was also retained. The green became brighter unlike previous seasons when dark green was the team's main colour. A Malaysian flag was displayed above the sidepod's front deflector at the Malaysian Grand Prix. Throughout the season, the logo of the football club Queens Park Rangers could be seen on the bargeboard of the cars.

In Korea, the Renault logos were badged as Renault Samsung, much like the Lotus F1 team did.

Coming into the final two rounds in the United States and Brazil, the team's sponsor AirAsia promoted their "#toPHwithlove" support campaign for donation and relief to benefit affected communities in the Philippines that were affected by the Typhoon Haiyan. In addition, all of the team's staff and guests made donations throughout the two weekends of the season to the fund.

== Complete Formula One results ==
(key) (results in bold indicate pole position; results in italics indicate fastest lap)

Year	Entrant	Engine	Tyres	Drivers	Grands Prix																			Points	WCC
Year	Entrant	Engine	Tyres	Drivers	AUS	MAL	CHN	BHR	ESP	MON	CAN	GBR	GER	HUN	BEL	ITA	SIN	KOR	JPN	IND	ABU	USA	BRA	Points	WCC
2013	Caterham F1 Team	Renault RS27-2013	**P**	Charles Pic	16	14	16	17	17	Ret	18	15	17	15	Ret	17	19	14	18	Ret	19	20	Ret	0	11th
2013	Caterham F1 Team	Renault RS27-2013	**P**	Giedo van der Garde	18	15	18	21	Ret	15	Ret	18	18	14	16	18	16	15	Ret	Ret	18	19	18	0	11th
