= Caterham F1 =

Defunct Formula One team

Caterham
- Full name: Caterham F1 Team
- Base: Leafield Technical Centre; Leafield, Oxfordshire, United Kingdom
- Founder(s): Tony Fernandes
- Noted staff: Tony Fernandes; Cyril Abiteboul; Mike Gascoyne; John Iley; Mark Smith
- Noted drivers: (Sweden) Marcus Ericsson (Netherlands) Giedo van der Garde (Japan) Kamui Kobayashi (Finland) Heikki Kovalainen (Russia) Vitaly Petrov (France) Charles Pic (United Kingdom) Will Stevens (Germany) André Lotterer
- Previous name: Lotus Racing/Team Lotus

Formula One World Championship career
- First entry: 2012 Australian Grand Prix
- Races entered: 56
- Engines: Renault
- Constructors' Championships: 0 (best result: 10th, 2012)
- Drivers' Championships: 0 (best result: 19th, Vitaly Petrov, 2012 and Marcus Ericsson, 2014)
- Race victories: 0
- Podiums: 0
- Points: 0
- Pole positions: 0
- Fastest laps: 0
- Final entry: 2014 Abu Dhabi Grand Prix

The Caterham F1 Team was a Malaysian, later British owned Formula One team based in the United Kingdom which raced under a Malaysian licence. The Caterham brand competed in the Formula One World Championship from 2012 to 2014, following the acquisition of British sportscar manufacturer Caterham Cars by former owner and team principal Tony Fernandes, forming the Caterham Group.

In July 2014, Tony Fernandes and his partners announced that they had sold the team to a consortium of Swiss and Middle Eastern investors. The "Caterham" name was later used under licence after the Caterham Group separation.

In October 2014, Caterham entered administration and did not attend a race weekend for the first time in its history beginning from the United States Grand Prix. In November 2014, after also missing the Brazilian Grand Prix, Caterham became the first F1 team ever to resort to crowdfunding, enabling it to race at the final Grand Prix for 2014 and take part in end of season testing both held in Abu Dhabi. On 27 February 2015, the Fédération Internationale de l'Automobile (FIA) published a revised entry list with Manor Marussia being reintroduced and Caterham being removed from the list, and by March of the same year, the team's assets were put up for auction, spelling the official demise of the team.

== History ==
=== Background ===
Fernandes's team originally entered Formula One in 2010 as Lotus Racing, using the Lotus name under licence from Group Lotus. Dubbed as 1Malaysia F1, the team was operated by 1Malaysia Racing Team Sdn Bhd. The project was part of the former Prime Minister Najib Razak's 1Malaysia initiative. When Proton – the parent company of Group Lotus – terminated the licence, Fernandes acquired the privately owned Team Lotus name for use in the 2011 season. As Proton began legal proceedings against the team, Fernandes acquired Caterham Cars. In November 2011, the team applied to the Formula One commission to formally change their constructor name for the 2012 season from Lotus to Caterham, while Renault changed their name to Lotus. Permission was granted before being formally ratified at a meeting of the FIA World Motor Sport Council. The team finished 10th in the Constructors' Championship in 2011, with three 13th-place finishes (two from Trulli, one from Kovalainen).

=== 2012 season ===
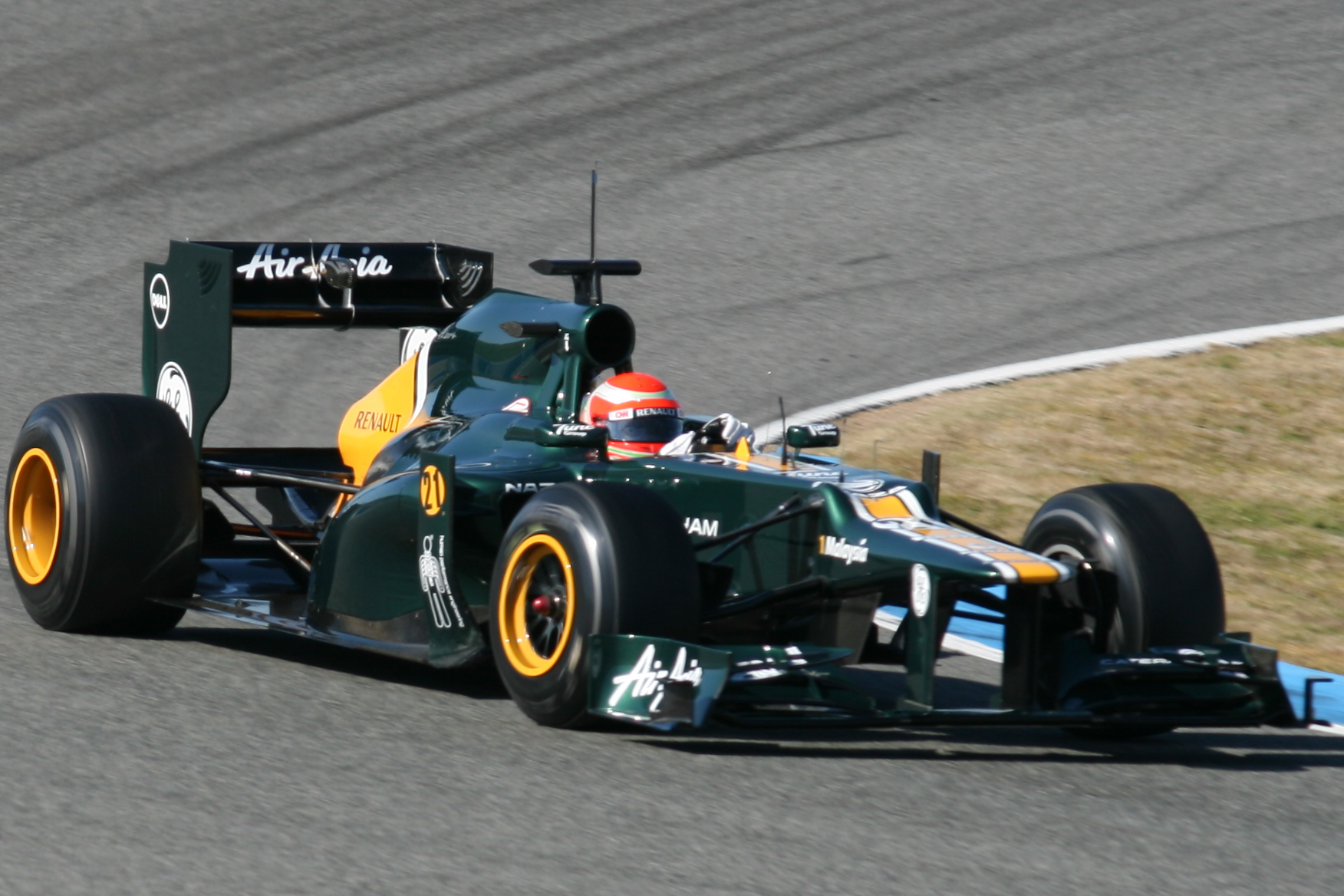
Jarno Trulli took part in the first pre-season test in February 2012, but was subsequently replaced by Vitaly Petrov

Trulli and Kovalainen re-signed with the team, under its new guise of Caterham, for the 2012 season.

On 18 January 2012, it was announced that the team would be moving to the Leafield Technical Centre in Leafield, Oxfordshire, the previous headquarters of both Arrows and Super Aguri F1 teams. The Caterham CT01 was the first car the team had built to run KERS.

On 17 February, the team announced that Vitaly Petrov would replace Trulli alongside Kovalainen for the 2012 season. Trulli was unsatisfied with the lack of development and he himself asked from the team if he could be replaced with another driver. Mark Smith took over pitwall operations from Group CTO Mike Gascoyne starting from the Chinese Grand Prix.

The Caterham car looked slower than expected at the beginning of the season. However, Caterham quickly found pace through Kovalainen, who made it into Q2 for the Bahrain Grand Prix, eliminating Michael Schumacher in the process. At the Monaco Grand Prix, Kovalainen achieved a season's best thirteenth place, staving off McLaren's Jenson Button until the latter spun trying to overtake him. Kovalainen again made it into the second part of qualifying, in Valencia, qualifying 16th for the race, after eliminating both Toro Rossos and title contender Mark Webber with the final lap of the first session. Caterham continued their good form into the race with both Kovalainen and Petrov running well until Kovalainen collided with Toro Rosso's Jean-Éric Vergne. The incident caused a safety car, but Kovalainen recovered to finish 14th behind Petrov, who managed what was at this point the team's joint best finish in 13th. At the British Grand Prix, an engine failure on Vitaly Petrov's Caterham on his way round to the grid meant he had to return to the pits and retire the car before the race had even begun. The team then went on to secure 10th place in the Constructors' Championship, pipping Marussia at the final post, after a hard last race where Vitaly Petrov achieved a team record-breaking 11th-place finish in front of Charles Pic while Kovalainen finished in 14th behind STR-Ferrari's Daniel Ricciardo.

=== 2013 season ===
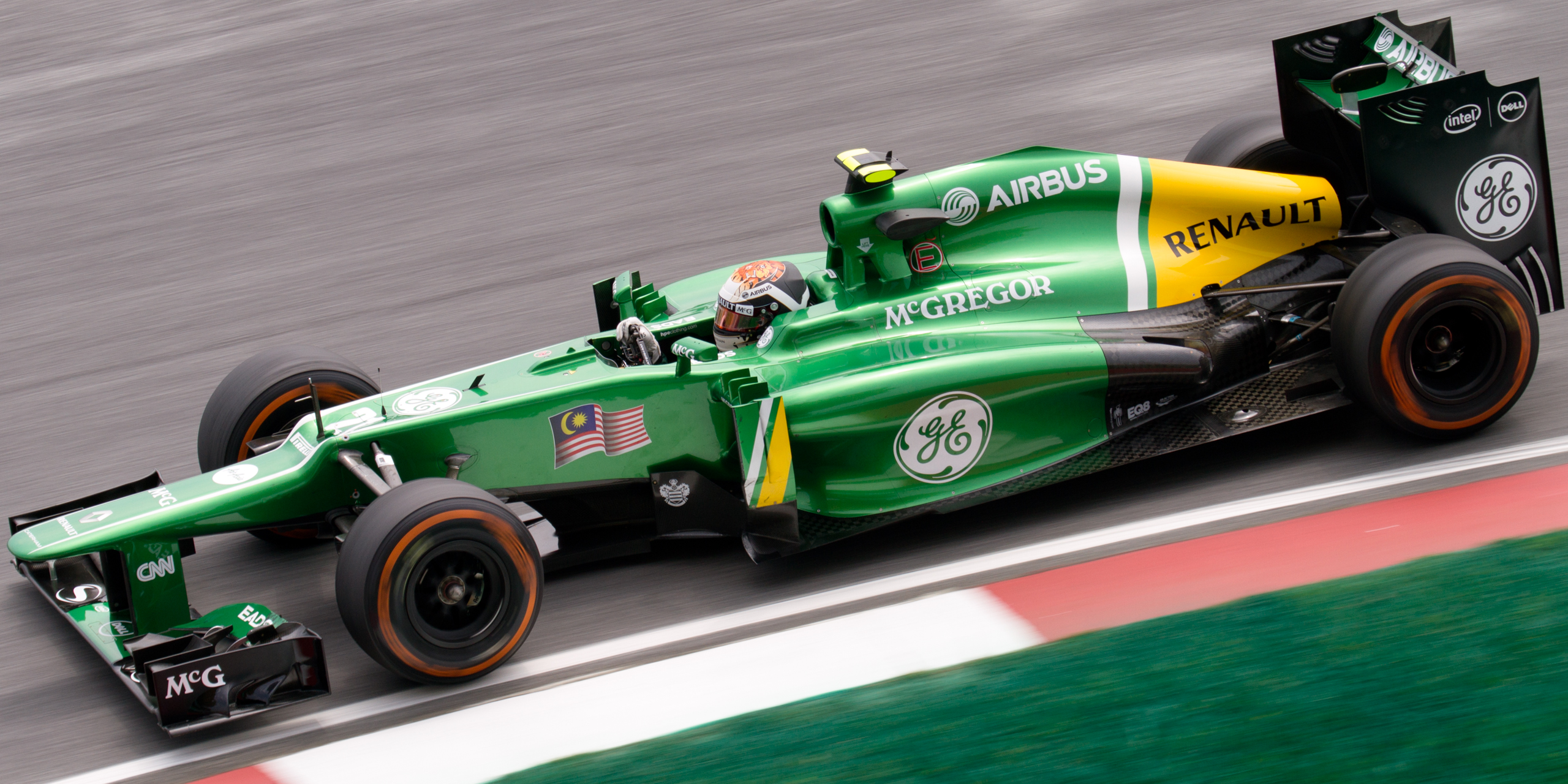
Giedo van der Garde at the 2013 Malaysian Grand Prix.

On 23 November 2012, it was announced that Marussia driver Charles Pic signed a multi-year contract with the team and his teammate was rookie Giedo van der Garde. On 1 March 2013, the team announced that Alexander Rossi and Ma Qinghua would be its reserve drivers for the 2013 season.

On 17 April 2013, it was confirmed that the team had re-signed Heikki Kovalainen as a reserve driver (formal technical development role) in order to test their upgrades. Ma Qinghua consequently lost his reserve driver seat. At the 2013 Belgian Grand Prix, Giedo van der Garde achieved Caterham's best-ever qualifying position with 14th place. Despite having a faster car than rivals Marussia, Caterham finished behind them in the Constructors' Championship, in 11th place.

=== 2014 season ===
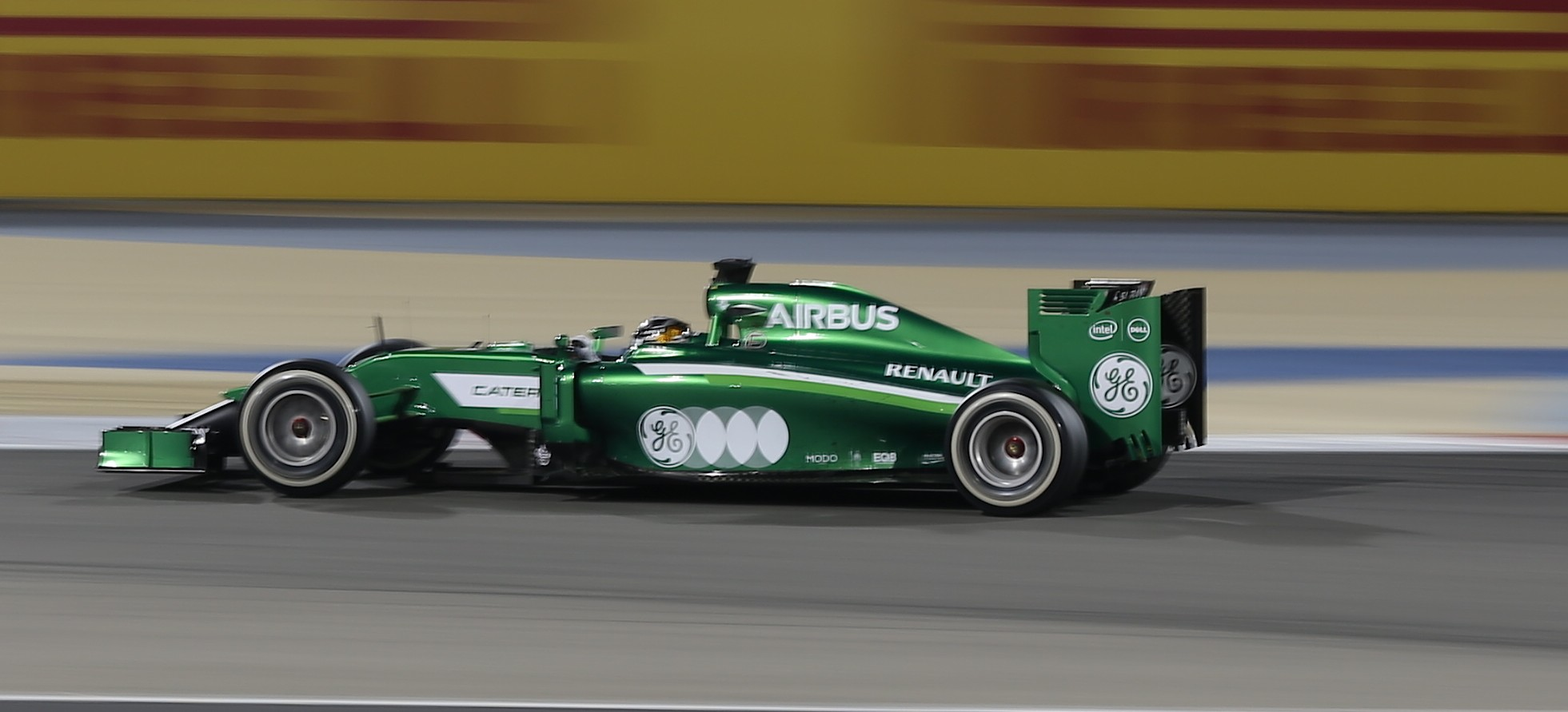
Kamui Kobayashi racing during the 2014 Bahrain Grand Prix.

On 21 January 2014, it was announced that the team would have a brand new driver line-up with Marcus Ericsson and Kamui Kobayashi taking the seats. Team owner Fernandes warned team members that he would quit if results did not improve in the 2014 season. After the 2014 Monaco Grand Prix, Caterham became the record holders for the most race starts without scoring a single point, after fellow rivals Marussia scored their first points finish since entering the sport in 2010, courtesy of the 9th-place finish from Jules Bianchi.

In July 2014, Caterham F1 announced that it was now owned by a consortium of Swiss and Middle Eastern investors, advised by former F1 Team Principal Colin Kolles. Former Dutch F1 driver, Christijan Albers, assisted by Manfredi Ravetto, became responsible for the day-to-day running of the team. Under this new management, unexpectedly, Kobayashi did not compete in the Belgian Grand Prix at Spa-Francorchamps. In his place, former Jaguar F1 test driver and three-time 24 Hours of Le Mans winner, André Lotterer, made his début in Formula One. He retired early from the race due to mechanical issues and turned down the chance to further race for Caterham, or in Formula One unless under better conditions.

==== Administration ====
On 21 October 2014, it was announced that Caterham had entered administration, and had withdrawn its management team. A statement issued on behalf of Caterham said that the administrators, Smith & Williamson, were now in control of the team. Bernie Ecclestone gave Caterham special dispensation to miss the United States and Brazilian Grands Prix while they attempted to find a buyer for the team.

In spite of the above dispensation, absence from any Grand Prix breached Formula One regulations. Nevertheless, at the United States Grand Prix, because of the team's current financial circumstances – similar to those of Marussia F1 – the FIA stewards decided to not impose any penalties. Instead, they referred the matter to the attention of the FIA president. In addition, for 2015, Sauber announced the engagement of Caterham's driver, Marcus Ericsson, who terminated his contract with Caterham on 12 November 2014.

==== Return to racing ====
On 5 November 2014, the FIA released the provisional 2015 entry list which included Caterham, who were listed as CF1 Caterham F1 Team. During the same week, it was also revealed that the team had arranged a surprise 3-race deal with Rubens Barrichello who last raced in 2011 and would have taken over Kobayashi's seat for the remainder of the 2014 season.

During the 2014 Brazilian Grand Prix weekend, Caterham's administrators resorted to crowdfunding in order to keep the team's chances of a return to the sport alive, much to the dismay of some Formula One personalities including Bernie Ecclestone. On 14 November 2014, it was reported that Caterham had succeeded in raising the necessary funds, via the crowdfunding initiative, to compete at the final Grand Prix of the 2014 season in Abu Dhabi. In contrast to multi-national logos adorning other team cars, according to media reports, a crowdfunding on-car sponsor for Caterham was a small UK pub: the Windmill Inn in Littleworth, West Sussex.

On 16 November 2014, it was announced by Caterham that Kobayashi would drive for the team in Abu Dhabi, and, on 20 November, that the second driver would be 23-year-old British driver, Will Stevens who had previously tested for the team and would also take part in post-season testing also at Abu Dhabi, immediately after the race weekend.

On 1 December 2014, it was announced that the team had received special dispensation to use their 2014 cars in the 2015 season, which would assist the administrator in finding a buyer for the team. Despite this, the team's assets were sold by auction, starting March 2015, meaning that attempts to race in 2015 had failed. The team then officially folded.

==== Staff controversies ====
On 25 July 2014, it was announced that over forty former employees were taking legal action against the team for unfair dismissal, following a number of cost cuts by Caterham F1's new owners.

In November 2014, despite Caterham F1 returning to racing under the control of its administrator following a successful crowdfunding initiative, 230 staff members not directly involved in Grand Prix preparations were made redundant.

The staff that were redundant received a redundancy payment in January 2019, over four years after the team was declared bankrupt.

== Complete Formula One results ==
(key)

Year	Chassis	Engine	Tyres	Drivers	1	2	3	4	5	6	7	8	9	10	11	12	13	14	15	16	17	18	19	20	Points	WCC
2012	CT01	Renault RS27-2012 2.4 V8	P		AUS	MAL	CHN	BHR	ESP	MON	CAN	EUR	GBR	GER	HUN	BEL	ITA	SIN	JPN	KOR	IND	ABU	USA	BRA	0	10th
2012	CT01	Renault RS27-2012 2.4 V8	P	(Finland) Heikki Kovalainen	Ret	18	23	17	16	13	18	14	17	19	17	17	14	15	15	17	18	13	18	14	0	10th
2012	CT01	Renault RS27-2012 2.4 V8	P	(Russia) Vitaly Petrov	Ret	16	18	16	17	Ret	19	13	DNS	16	19	14	15	19	17	16	17	16	17	11	0	10th
2013	CT03	Renault RS27-2013 2.4 V8	P		AUS	MAL	CHN	BHR	ESP	MON	CAN	GBR	GER	HUN	BEL	ITA	SIN	KOR	JPN	IND	ABU	USA	BRA		0	11th
2013	CT03	Renault RS27-2013 2.4 V8	P	(France) Charles Pic	16	14	16	17	17	Ret	18	15	17	15	Ret	17	19	14	18	Ret	19	20	Ret		0	11th
2013	CT03	Renault RS27-2013 2.4 V8	P	(Netherlands) Giedo van der Garde	18	15	18	21	Ret	15	Ret	18	18	14	16	18	16	15	Ret	Ret	18	19	18		0	11th
2014	CT05	Renault Energy F1-2014 1.6 V6 t	P		AUS	MAL	BHR	CHN	ESP	MON	CAN	AUT	GBR	GER	HUN	BEL	ITA	SIN	JPN	RUS	USA	BRA	ABU		0	11th
2014	CT05	Renault Energy F1-2014 1.6 V6 t	P	(Sweden) Marcus Ericsson	Ret	14	Ret	20	20	11	Ret	18	Ret	18	Ret	17	19	15	17	19					0	11th
2014	CT05	Renault Energy F1-2014 1.6 V6 t	P	(United Kingdom) Will Stevens																			17		0	11th
2014	CT05	Renault Energy F1-2014 1.6 V6 t	P	(Japan) Kamui Kobayashi	Ret	13	15	18	Ret	13	Ret	16	15	16	Ret		17	DNS	19	Ret			Ret		0	11th
2014	CT05	Renault Energy F1-2014 1.6 V6 t	P	(Germany) André Lotterer												Ret									0	11th

== Driver development programme ==
During Caterham's time in F1, the team supported multiple drivers through the Caterham Racing Team in the GP2 Series and gave them the opportunity to participate in Formula One test sessions. Giedo van der Garde and Will Stevens were the only drivers of the programme to compete for the team in F1. The drivers included:

=== Former drivers ===
Driver	Years	Current series	Titles achieved as Caterham driver
(Netherlands) Giedo van der Garde	2012	None	none as Caterham F1 development program member
(United States) Alexander Rossi	2012–2014	IndyCar Series	none as Caterham F1 development program member
(United Kingdom) Matt Parry	2012–2014	None	InterSteps Championship; Formula Renault 2.0 NEC
(Malaysia) Weiron Tan	2012–2014	None	none as Caterham F1 development program member
(Singapore) Daim Hishamuddin	2012–2014	None	Rotax Max Challenge Asia - Junior; RMC Asia Championship - Rotax Junior
(Spain) Sergio Canamasas	2013	None	none as Caterham F1 development program member
(China) Ma Qinghua	2013	World Touring Car Cup	none as Caterham F1 development program member
(France) Aurélien Panis	2013	GT World Challenge Europe Endurance Cup; GT World Challenge Europe Sprint Cup	none as Caterham F1 development program member
(United Kingdom) Will Stevens	2013–2014	FIA World Endurance Championship	none as Caterham F1 development program member
(United Kingdom) Seb Morris	2014	GT Cup Championship	none as Caterham F1 development program member
(Netherlands) Robin Frijns	2014	Formula E World Championship; FIA World Endurance Championship	none as Caterham F1 development program member
(France) Nathanaël Berthon	2014	European Le Mans Series; FIA World Endurance Championship	none as Caterham F1 development program member
(Italy) Kevin Giovesi	2014	None	none as Caterham F1 development program member
