= FIA Contract Recognition Board =

- Abbreviation: CRB
- Location: Geneva, Switzerland
- Region served: International

The FIA Contract Recognition Board (CRB) is a body set up by motorsports governing body, the FIA, to determine the legality of driver contracts and to settle disputes between Formula One teams over such contracts. The CRB meets in Geneva, Switzerland and is made up of independent lawyers who are considered to be suitably experienced in the law of contract. Its purpose is to deliver decisions within a short time frame, avoiding the lengthy process typical of court proceedings.

The CRB was formed after Michael Schumacher signed to drive for Benetton in 1991, despite having agreed to discuss a contract with Jordan.

== Jenson Button (2004) ==
In August 2004, Jenson Button signed a contract with Williams even though he had a valid contract with BAR. The CRB ruled in BAR's favour on 20 October that year and Button remained with the team.

Although not a strict CRB decision, Button signed a contract with Williams to drive with them in 2006, but then later felt he would be better placed at BAR to get his maiden win as Williams were about to lose their works supply of BMW engines. Although Frank Williams determined the contract to be watertight, he later settled with Button for £18m not to take his option at Williams.

== Timo Glock (2007) ==
During November 2007, Timo Glock signed a contract with Toyota for the 2008 season but BMW Sauber also claimed to have a valid contract for 2008. The CRB ruled in favour of Toyota who then subsequently announced Glock as a driver.

== Oscar Piastri (2022) ==
Oscar Piastri was signed to the Renault Sport Academy in 2020 as part of their Driver Development Program, which included racing in FIA Formula 3, FIA Formula 2 and testing in Formula One. When Fernando Alonso signed for Aston Martin for the 2023 season, Alpine quickly announced Piastri's promotion to a racing seat. However, Piastri quickly rebuffed Alpine's announcement by claiming he never signed a contract to race with the team. The CRB met on 29 August 2022 to determine whether Piastri was contracted to Alpine, or if he was free to join a different team for 2023. On 2 September, during the 2022 Dutch Grand Prix weekend, the CRB made a ruling against Alpine, recognising the contract between Piastri and McLaren signed on 4 July 2022 for the 2023 and 2024 seasons. McLaren announced Piastri's signing shortly after the CRB's decision, and Alpine were ordered to pay the legal costs of McLaren and Piastri as well as the arbitrators' fees.
