= List of Formula One Promotional Trophy winners =

Formula One Management has awarded three different promotional awards, the Television Trophy for the best host broadcaster, the Race Promoters' Trophy for the best race promoter and the ASN Trophy (also called Bernie Ecclestone Trophy) for the best-scoring national sporting association. The Race Promoters' for race promoters was first awarded in 1975. In 2007 only the Race Promoters' and ASN Trophies were awarded, leaving the TV Trophy out. This may be because the FOM World Feed is now the main broadcaster for almost all races.

Previously, the Race Promoters' Trophy was awarded by the Formula One Constructors Association (FOCA) as the FOCA Award. Therefore, FOCA's name still remains in the main body of the trophy for race promoters.

== Race Promoters' Trophy ==
=== By season ===
Year	Grand Prix	Circuit
2019	(Mexico) Mexican Grand Prix	Mexico City
2018	(Mexico) Mexican Grand Prix	Mexico City
2017	(Mexico) Mexican Grand Prix	Mexico City
2016	(Mexico) Mexican Grand Prix	Mexico City
2015	(Mexico) Mexican Grand Prix	Mexico City
2014	(Russia) Russian Grand Prix	Sochi
2013	(Brazil) Brazilian Grand Prix	Interlagos
2012	(India) Indian Grand Prix	Buddh
2011	(India) Indian Grand Prix	Buddh
2010	(South Korea) Korean Grand Prix	Yeongam
2009	(United Arab Emirates) Abu Dhabi Grand Prix	Yas Marina
2008	Singapore Grand Prix	Marina Bay
2007	United States Grand Prix	Indianapolis
2006	(Brazil) Brazilian Grand Prix	Interlagos
2005	Monaco Grand Prix	Monte Carlo
2004	Bahrain Grand Prix	Sakhir
2003	(Spain) Spanish Grand Prix	Catalunya
2002	(Hungary) Hungarian Grand Prix	Hungaroring
2001	(Canada) Canadian Grand Prix	Montreal
2000	United States Grand Prix	Indianapolis
1999	(Malaysia) Malaysian Grand Prix	Sepang
1998	San Marino Grand Prix	Imola
1997	(Australia) Australian Grand Prix	Melbourne
1996	(Australia) Australian Grand Prix	Melbourne
1995	(Australia) Australian Grand Prix	Adelaide
1994	(Japan) Pacific Grand Prix	TI Circuit Aida
1993	(Europe) European Grand Prix	Donington
1992	(France) French Grand Prix	Magny-Cours
1991	(France) French Grand Prix	Magny-Cours
1990	(Australia) Australian Grand Prix	Adelaide
1989	(Japan) Japanese Grand Prix	Suzuka
1988	(United Kingdom) British Grand Prix	Silverstone
1987	(Japan) Japanese Grand Prix	Suzuka
1986	(Mexico) Mexican Grand Prix	Mexico City
1985	(Australia) Australian Grand Prix	Adelaide
1984	(United States) Detroit Grand Prix	Detroit
1983	(Italy) Italian Grand Prix	Monza
1982	(United Kingdom) British Grand Prix	Brands Hatch
1981	(United States) Caesars Palace Grand Prix	Las Vegas
1980	(Italy) Italian Grand Prix	Imola
1979	(Italy) Italian Grand Prix	Monza
1978	(United Kingdom) British Grand Prix	Brands Hatch
1977	(United Kingdom) British Grand Prix	Silverstone
1976	United States Grand Prix West	Long Beach
1975	Monaco Grand Prix	Monte Carlo

=== By Grand Prix ===
Grand Prix	Win(s)	Year(s)
(Mexico) Mexican Grand Prix	6	1986, 2015, 2016, 2017, 2018, 2019
(Australia) Australian Grand Prix	5	1985, 1990, 1995, 1996, 1997
(United Kingdom) British Grand Prix	4	1977, 1978, 1982, 1988
(Italy) Italian Grand Prix	3	1979, 1980, 1983
(Japan) Japanese Grand Prix	2	1987, 1989
(France) French Grand Prix	2	1991, 1992
Monaco Grand Prix	2	1975, 2005
United States Grand Prix	2	2000, 2007
(India) Indian Grand Prix	2	2011, 2012
(Brazil) Brazilian Grand Prix	2	2006, 2013
United States Grand Prix West	1	1976
(United States) Caesars Palace Grand Prix	1	1981
(United States) Detroit Grand Prix	1	1984
(Europe) European Grand Prix	1	1993
(Japan) Pacific Grand Prix	1	1994
San Marino Grand Prix	1	1998
(Malaysia) Malaysian Grand Prix	1	1999
(Canada) Canadian Grand Prix	1	2001
(Hungary) Hungarian Grand Prix	1	2002
(Spain) Spanish Grand Prix	1	2003
Bahrain Grand Prix	1	2004
Singapore Grand Prix	1	2008
(United Arab Emirates) Abu Dhabi Grand Prix	1	2009
(South Korea) Korean Grand Prix	1	2010
(Russia) Russian Grand Prix	1	2014

=== By circuit ===
Circuit	Location	Win(s)	Year(s)
Autódromo Hermanos Rodríguez	Mexico City	6	1986, 2015, 2016, 2017, 2018, 2019
Adelaide Street Circuit	(Australia) Adelaide	3	1985, 1990, 1995
Brands Hatch	(United Kingdom) Kent	2	1978, 1982
Autodromo Nazionale Monza	(Italy) Monza	2	1979, 1983
Silverstone Circuit	(United Kingdom) Silverstone	2	1977, 1988
Suzuka Circuit	(Japan) Suzuka	2	1987, 1989
Circuit de Nevers Magny-Cours	(France) Magny-Cours and Nevers	2	1991, 1992
Melbourne Grand Prix Circuit	(Australia) Albert Park, Melbourne	2	1996, 1997
Autodromo Enzo e Dino Ferrari	(Italy) Imola	2	1980, 1998
Circuit de Monaco	(Monaco) Monte Carlo	2	1975, 2005
Indianapolis Motor Speedway	(United States) Speedway, Indiana	2	2000, 2007
Buddh International Circuit	(India) New Delhi	2	2011, 2012
Autódromo José Carlos Pace	(Brazil) São Paulo	2	2006, 2013
Long Beach street circuit	(United States) Long Beach	1	1976
Las Vegas street circuit	(United States) Las Vegas	1	1981
Detroit street circuit	(United States) Detroit	1	1984
Donington Park	(United Kingdom) North West Leicestershire	1	1993
TI Circuit Aida	(Japan) Aida	1	1994
Sepang International Circuit	(Malaysia) Sepang	1	1999
Circuit Gilles Villeneuve	(Canada) Montreal	1	2001
Hungaroring	(Hungary) Budapest	1	2002
Circuit de Catalunya	(Spain) Barcelona	1	2003
Bahrain International Circuit	(Bahrain) Sakhir	1	2004
Marina Bay Street Circuit	Singapore Grand Prix	1	2008
Yas Marina Circuit	(United Arab Emirates) Abu Dhabi	1	2009
Korea International Circuit	(South Korea) Yeongam	1	2010
Sochi Autodrom	(Russia) Sochi	1	2014

== Television Trophy ==
The Television Trophy is awarded to the host broadcaster voted by all the other host broadcasters for having produced the best coverage of an event during the Formula One season.

Year	Broadcaster
2013	(United Kingdom) Sky Sports
2012	(United Kingdom) Sky Sports
2011	(United Kingdom) BBC Sport
2010	(United Kingdom) Formula One Management (United Arab Emirates) Abu Dhabi Media Company
2009	(United Kingdom) Formula One Management
2008	(United Kingdom) Formula One Management
2006	(United Kingdom) Formula One Management
2005	(Germany) RTL Television
2004	(United Kingdom) Formula One Management
1995	(Australia) Nine Network
1994	(Australia) Nine Network
1993	(Australia) Nine Network
1992	(Australia) Nine Network
1991	(Australia) Nine Network
1990	(Australia) Nine Network
1989	(Australia) Nine Network
1988	(Australia) Nine Network
1987	(Australia) Nine Network
1986	(Australia) Nine Network
1985	(Australia) Nine Network

== ASN Trophy ==
The ASN Trophy is awarded to the national sporting association with the most driver points during the season.

Year	ASN
2025	(United Kingdom) Motor Sports Association
2024	(United Kingdom) Motor Sports Association
2023	(United Kingdom) Motor Sports Association
2022	(United Kingdom) Motor Sports Association
2021	(United Kingdom) Motor Sports Association
2020	(United Kingdom) Motor Sports Association
2019	(United Kingdom) Motor Sports Association
2018	(Finland) AKK-Motorsport
2017	(Finland) AKK-Motorsport
2016	(Germany) Deutscher Motor Sport Bund
2015	(Germany) Deutscher Motor Sport Bund
2014	(Germany) Deutscher Motor Sport Bund
2013	(Germany) Deutscher Motor Sport Bund
2012	(Germany) Deutscher Motor Sport Bund
2011	(Germany) Deutscher Motor Sport Bund
2010	(Germany) Allgemeiner Deutscher Automobil-Club
2009	(Germany) Allgemeiner Deutscher Automobil-Club
2008	(Germany) Allgemeiner Deutscher Automobil-Club
2007	(Finland) AKK-Motorsport
2006	(Germany) Allgemeiner Deutscher Automobil-Club
2005	(Spain) Real Federación Española de Automovilismo
2004	(Germany) Allgemeiner Deutscher Automobil-Club
2003	(Germany) Allgemeiner Deutscher Automobil-Club
2002	(Germany) Allgemeiner Deutscher Automobil-Club
2001	(Germany) Allgemeiner Deutscher Automobil-Club
2000	(Germany) Allgemeiner Deutscher Automobil-Club
1999	(United Kingdom) Motor Sports Association
1998	(United Kingdom) Motor Sports Association
1997	(United Kingdom) Motor Sports Association
1996	(United Kingdom) Motor Sports Association
1995	(United Kingdom) Motor Sports Association
1994	(United Kingdom) Motor Sports Association
1993	(United Kingdom) Motor Sports Association
1992	(United Kingdom) Motor Sports Association
1991	(Brazil) Confederação Brasileira de Automobilismo
1990	(Brazil) Confederação Brasileira de Automobilismo
1989	(Brazil) Confederação Brasileira de Automobilismo
