= 2012 Korean Grand Prix =

16th round of the 2012 Formula One season

Race 16 of 20 in the 2012 Formula One World Championship
← Previous race	Next race →

Race details
- Date: 14 October 2012
- Official name: 2012 Formula 1 Korean Grand Prix
- Location: Yeongam, South Jeolla, South Korea
- Course: Korea International Circuit
- Course length: 5.621 km (3.493 miles)
- Distance: 55 laps, 309.155 km (192.100 miles)
- Weather: Fine and Dry Air Temp 21 °C (70 °F) Track Temp 27 °C (81 °F) dropping to 23 °C (73 °F)
- Attendance: Poor

Pole position
Driver	(Australia) Mark Webber	Red Bull-Renault
- Time: 1:37.242

Fastest lap
Driver	(Australia) Mark Webber	Red Bull-Renault
- Time: 1:42.037 on lap 54

Podium
First	(Germany) Sebastian Vettel	Red Bull-Renault
Second	(Australia) Mark Webber	Red Bull-Renault
Third	(Spain) Fernando Alonso	Ferrari

The 2012 Korean Grand Prix (formally known as the 2012 Formula 1 Korean Grand Prix) was a Formula One motor race that was the sixteenth round of the 2012 Formula One season. It was held on 14 October 2012 at the Korea International Circuit near Yeongam in South Korea's South Jeolla Province. The race marked the third running of the Korean Grand Prix.

Mark Webber started the race from pole alongside Sebastian Vettel, who went on to win the race ahead of Webber and championship leader Fernando Alonso, who completed the podium. The organisers of the race invited Korean rapper PSY to wave the chequered flag. This was Red Bull's only 1-2 finish of the year.

After taking his third consecutive Grand Prix victory, Vettel took a six-point championship lead over Alonso with four races to go, while Räikkönen remained in third with a 48-points-deficit to Vettel, who reclaimed the championship lead for the first time since that year's Bahrain Grand Prix. Following the result, Mercedes were mathematically eliminated from clinching the Constructors' Championship, with the remaining four teams at the top having a mathematical chance of winning it. Red Bull extended their lead to 77 points over second-placed Ferrari that leapfrogged McLaren in the standings to build a six-point-gap over the british squad following the latter's disappointing weekend.

== Report ==
=== Background ===
In the week before the race, the FIA announced that the drag reduction system zone on the circuit would be altered from its 2011 position, bringing the activation point forward by 200 metres (660 ft). The detection point was brought forward; in 2011, it was positioned between the first two corners, but for 2012, it was moved to be 90 metres (300 ft) before the first corner.

Like the 2011 Korean Grand Prix, tyre supplier Pirelli brought its yellow-banded soft compound tyre as the harder "prime" tyre and the red-banded supersoft compound tyre as the softer "option" tyre.

Marussia's Charles Pic was given a ten-place grid penalty for exceeding the maximum number of engines that he was permitted to use over the course of the season.

Several reserve drivers took the place of regular drivers for the first free practice session. Giedo van der Garde drove in place of Caterham's Vitaly Petrov, while Jules Bianchi replaced Nico Hülkenberg at Force India, Valtteri Bottas drove Bruno Senna's Williams and Dani Clos took Narain Karthikeyan's place at HRT.

=== Free practice ===
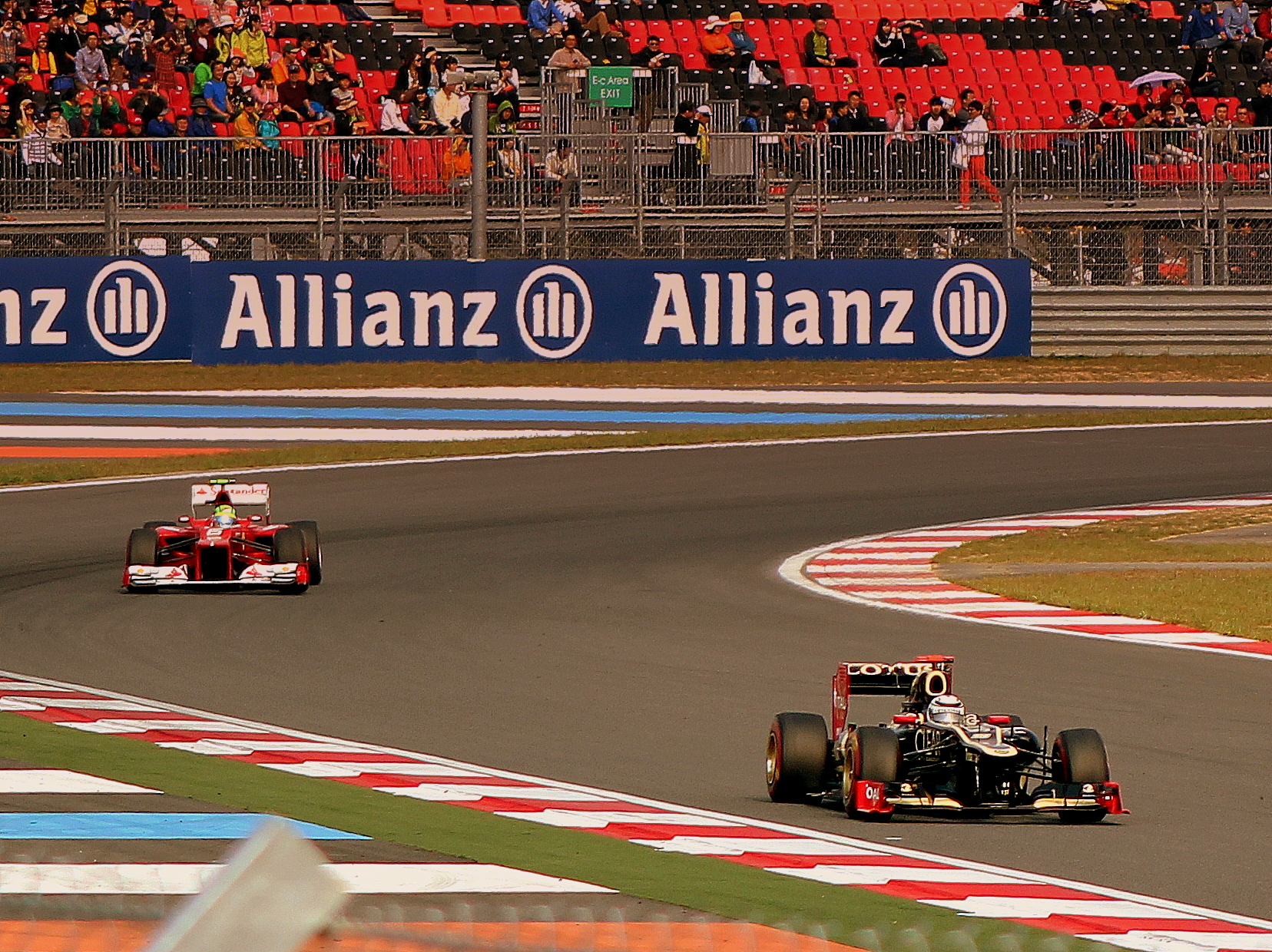
Räikkönen leads Massa. They would finish the race in 5th and 4th respectively

In contrast to the practice sessions of the 2010 and 2011 races, the first free practice session of the 2012 race took place in dry conditions. Lewis Hamilton ended the session as fastest driver, three tenths of a second ahead of Fernando Alonso — who had led most of the ninety-minute session — with Mark Webber in third place. Sebastian Vettel was fastest in the second session, leading teammate Webber and Alonso in third. Like the first session, the second passed without incident, although Sergio Pérez was forced out after forty-five minutes of running when his Sauber lost all power and ground to a halt at Turn 12. Pérez was able to safely park the car, allowing the session to continue uninterrupted.

=== Race ===
Mark Webber, who qualified on pole, lost his lead at start to teammate Sebastian Vettel at the first turn. Lewis Hamilton lost his third place to Alonso on first lap, while his team mate Jenson Button had to retire after a collision with Kobayashi, who also collided with Nico Rosberg of Mercedes. Lewis Hamilton made a pit stop on lap 14, creating a chain reaction where Massa and Webber stopped on lap 15 and finally Vettel and Alonso stopped on lap 16. The latter rejoined side-by-side with Sergio Pérez, outdragging him on the back straight. Hamilton seized his opportunity and swept around the outside of Pérez just a few corners later. Felipe Massa moved to 4th place after overtaking Hamilton who was suffering from an anti-roll bar failure on his car, which led him to lose couple of places in the race. Massa was quickly gaining on his teammate when he was told to hold his position on his team radio as Alonso was the championship contender. At the end of the race Vettel was continuously told on his team radio to slow down and save tyres as he had a problem with tyre degradation on his right-front tyre. Vettel finished first and took a six-point lead in the Championship over third-placed Fernando Alonso, who had led since the European Grand Prix. Webber finished second, setting the fastest lap. Lewis Hamilton finished 10th after battling for position with the two Toro Rossos of Daniel Ricciardo and Jean-Éric Vergne, but fell back in the closing laps as a piece of AstroTurf got stuck on one of his car's sidepods.

== Classification ==
=== Qualifying ===
Pos.	No.	Driver	Constructor	Part 1	Part 2	Part 3	Grid
1	2	(Australia) Mark Webber	Red Bull-Renault	1:38.397	1:38.220	1:37.242	1
2	1	(Germany) Sebastian Vettel	Red Bull-Renault	1:38.208	1:37.767	1:37.316	2
3	4	(United Kingdom) Lewis Hamilton	McLaren-Mercedes	1:39.180	1:38.000	1:37.469	3
4	5	(Spain) Fernando Alonso	Ferrari	1:39.144	1:37.987	1:37.534	4
5	9	(Finland) Kimi Räikkönen	Lotus-Renault	1:38.887	1:38.227	1:37.625	5
6	6	(Brazil) Felipe Massa	Ferrari	1:38.937	1:38.253	1:37.884	6
7	10	(France) Romain Grosjean	Lotus-Renault	1:38.863	1:38.275	1:37.934	7
8	12	(Germany) Nico Hülkenberg	Force India-Mercedes	1:38.981	1:38.428	1:38.266	8
9	8	(Germany) Nico Rosberg	Mercedes	1:38.999	1:38.417	1:38.361	9
10	7	(Germany) Michael Schumacher	Mercedes	1:38.808	1:38.436	1:38.513	10
11	3	(United Kingdom) Jenson Button	McLaren-Mercedes	1:38.615	1:38.441		11
12	15	(Mexico) Sergio Pérez	Sauber-Ferrari	1:38.630	1:38.460		12
13	14	(Japan) Kamui Kobayashi	Sauber-Ferrari	1:38.719	1:38.594		13
14	11	(United Kingdom) Paul di Resta	Force India-Mercedes	1:38.942	1:38.643		14
15	18	(Venezuela) Pastor Maldonado	Williams-Renault	1:39.024	1:38.725		15
16	16	(Australia) Daniel Ricciardo	Toro Rosso-Ferrari	1:38.784	1:39.084		21^{1}
17	17	(France) Jean-Éric Vergne	Toro Rosso-Ferrari	1:38.774	1:39.340		16
18	19	(Brazil) Bruno Senna	Williams-Renault	1:39.443			17
19	21	(Russia) Vitaly Petrov	Caterham-Renault	1:40.207			18
20	20	(Finland) Heikki Kovalainen	Caterham-Renault	1:40.333			19
21	25	(France) Charles Pic	Marussia-Cosworth	1:41.317			24^{2}
22	24	(Germany) Timo Glock	Marussia-Cosworth	1:41.371			20
23	22	(Spain) Pedro de la Rosa	HRT-Cosworth	1:42.881			22
107% time: 1:45.082
—	23	(India) Narain Karthikeyan	HRT-Cosworth	No time^{3}			23

Notes:

- ^1 — Daniel Ricciardo received a five-place grid penalty for an unscheduled gearbox change.
- ^2 — Charles Pic was given a ten-place grid penalty for exceeding the maximum number of engines permitted for use over the course of the season.
- ^3 — Narain Karthikeyan failed to set a time after having a brake failure. He was allowed to race at the stewards' discretion.

=== Race ===
Pos	No	Driver	Constructor	Laps	Time/Retired	Grid	Points
1	1	(Germany) Sebastian Vettel	Red Bull-Renault	55	1:36:28.651	2	25
2	2	(Australia) Mark Webber	Red Bull-Renault	55	+8.231	1	18
3	5	(Spain) Fernando Alonso	Ferrari	55	+13.944	4	15
4	6	(Brazil) Felipe Massa	Ferrari	55	+20.168	6	12
5	9	(Finland) Kimi Räikkönen	Lotus-Renault	55	+36.739	5	10
6	12	(Germany) Nico Hülkenberg	Force India-Mercedes	55	+45.301	8	8
7	10	(France) Romain Grosjean	Lotus-Renault	55	+54.812	7	6
8	17	(France) Jean-Éric Vergne	Toro Rosso-Ferrari	55	+1:09.589	16	4
9	16	(Australia) Daniel Ricciardo	Toro Rosso-Ferrari	55	+1:11.787	21	2
10	4	(United Kingdom) Lewis Hamilton	McLaren-Mercedes	55	+1:19.692	3	1
11	15	(Mexico) Sergio Pérez	Sauber-Ferrari	55	+1:20.062	12	
12	11	(United Kingdom) Paul di Resta	Force India-Mercedes	55	+1:24.448	14	
13	7	(Germany) Michael Schumacher	Mercedes	55	+1:29.241	10	
14	18	(Venezuela) Pastor Maldonado	Williams-Renault	55	+1:34.924	15	
15	19	(Brazil) Bruno Senna	Williams-Renault	55	+1:36.902	17	
16	21	(Russia) Vitaly Petrov	Caterham-Renault	54	+1 Lap	18	
17	20	(Finland) Heikki Kovalainen	Caterham-Renault	54	+1 Lap	19	
18	24	(Germany) Timo Glock	Marussia-Cosworth	54	+1 Lap	20	
19	25	(France) Charles Pic	Marussia-Cosworth	53	+2 Laps	24	
20	23	(India) Narain Karthikeyan	HRT-Cosworth	53	+2 Laps	23	
Ret	22	(Spain) Pedro de la Rosa	HRT-Cosworth	16	Throttle	22	
Ret	14	(Japan) Kamui Kobayashi	Sauber-Ferrari	16	Collision damage	13	
Ret	8	(Germany) Nico Rosberg	Mercedes	1	Collision damage	9	
Ret	3	(United Kingdom) Jenson Button	McLaren-Mercedes	0	Collision	11	

== Championship standings after the race ==
Drivers' Championship standings

	Pos.	Driver	Points
1	1	(Germany) Sebastian Vettel*	215
1	2	(Spain) Fernando Alonso*	209
	3	(Finland) Kimi Räikkönen*	167
	4	(United Kingdom) Lewis Hamilton*	153
	5	(Australia) Mark Webber*	152

Constructors' Championship standings

	Pos.	Constructor	Points
	1	(Austria) Red Bull-Renault*	367
1	2	(Italy) Ferrari*	290
1	3	(United Kingdom) McLaren-Mercedes*	284
	4	(United Kingdom) Lotus-Renault*	255
	5	(Germany) Mercedes	136

- Note: Only the top five positions are included for both sets of standings.
- Bold text and an asterisk indicates competitors who still had a theoretical chance of becoming World Champion.

Previous race: 2012 Japanese Grand Prix	FIA Formula One World Championship; 2012 season	Next race: 2012 Indian Grand Prix
Previous race: 2011 Korean Grand Prix	Korean Grand Prix	Next race: 2013 Korean Grand Prix
