= Yeongam Jong clan =

- Country: Korea
- Current region: Yeongam County
- Founder: Jong Seok

Yeongam Jong clan (Korean: 영암 종씨; Hanja: 靈巖 鍾氏) was one of the Korean clans. Their Bon-gwan was in Yeongam County, South Jeolla Province. Jong clan was begun because Duke Huan of Song (Hanja: 宋桓公) appointed his second son as Jongseong (Korean: 종성; Hanja: 鍾城)’s lord, but it is not clear that how Duke Huan of Song (Hanja: 宋桓公)’s second son entered Korea. Jong Gwan su (Hanja: 鍾寬秀), a family member of Duke Huan of Song (Hanja: 宋桓公)’s second son, was appointed as Prince of Yeongam (Hanja: 霊岩伯) during Taejo of Joseon’s reign in Joseon. Jong Seok, Jong Gwan su (Hanja: 鍾寬秀)’s descendant, began Yeongam Jong clan because he was bestowed territories in Yeongam.

== See also ==
- Korean clan names of foreign origin
