= 2013 Korean Grand Prix =

Race 14 of 19 in the 2013 Formula One World Championship
← Previous race	Next race →
- Korean International Circuit

Race details
- Date: 6 October 2013
- Official name: 2013 Formula 1 Korean Grand Prix
- Location: Korea International Circuit; Yeongam, South Korea
- Course: Permanent racing facility
- Course length: 5.621 km (3.493 miles)
- Distance: 55 laps, 309.155 km (192.100 miles)
- Weather: Cloudy with maximum temperatures reaching 29 degrees during the day
- Attendance: 60,000

Pole position
Driver	(Germany) Sebastian Vettel	Red Bull-Renault
- Time: 1:37.202

Fastest lap
Driver	(Germany) Sebastian Vettel	Red Bull-Renault
- Time: 1:41.380 on lap 53

Podium
First	(Germany) Sebastian Vettel	Red Bull-Renault
Second	(Finland) Kimi Räikkönen	Lotus-Renault
Third	(France) Romain Grosjean	Lotus-Renault

The 2013 Korean Grand Prix (formally known as the 2013 Formula 1 Korean Grand Prix) was a Formula One motor race that was held on 6 October 2013 at the Korea International Circuit in Yeongam, South Korea. The race was the fourteenth round of the 2013 FIA Formula One World Championship, and marked the fourth and final running of the Korean Grand Prix. The 53 lap race was won by Sebastian Vettel for Red Bull Racing with Kimi Räikkönen finishing second for Lotus F1. Raikkonen's teammate Romain Grosjean finished third.

== Overview ==
The race was contested over 55 laps and was won by Sebastian Vettel, driving for Red Bull Racing. He dominantly won the race to claim his fourth consecutive victory of the season. He achieved a grand slam for the second race in a row, becoming the first driver since Jim Clark in 1963 to achieve the feat in consecutive race weekends. Lotus team-mates Kimi Räikkönen and Romain Grosjean rounded out the podium, a result shrouded in minor controversy after Grosjean asked for team orders late in the race having lost the position to Räikkönen on a safety car restart. Nico Hülkenberg finished an equal career-best fourth place for Sauber, describing it as "one of the best races in my career so far."

The result meant that Vettel extended his lead to 77 points over Alonso; this put him in mathematical contention to seal his fourth consecutive championship in the next race in Japan, but ultimately had to wait until India. Räikkönen leapfrogged Hamilton to go third, 28 points behind Alonso while Hamilton's result meant he was six points behind Räikkönen's score. Behind them, Mark Webber, who retired after a fire due to a collision with Adrian Sutil, kept fifth while Rosberg also stayed in sixth. On lap 38 a fire truck appeared on track on its driver's own accord during a safety car period after Webber's car caught fire.

Despite major circuit renovations including a complete modification to the exit of the pit lane, this was the last Korean Grand Prix in Formula One to date – the race was on the 2014 provisional calendar (scheduled for 25–27 April) but the South Jeolla provincial government cut funding to the event due to very low spectator turnout, hindered by the venues' rural location.

== Classification ==
=== Qualifying ===
Pos.	No.	Driver	Constructor	Q1	Q2	Q3	Grid
1	1	(Germany) Sebastian Vettel	Red Bull-Renault	1:38.683	1:37.569	1:37.202	1
2	10	(United Kingdom) Lewis Hamilton	Mercedes	1:38.574	1:37.824	1:37.420	2
3	2	(Australia) Mark Webber	Red Bull-Renault	1:39.138	1:37.840	1:37.464	13^{1}
4	8	(France) Romain Grosjean	Lotus-Renault	1:39.065	1:38.076	1:37.531	3
5	9	(Germany) Nico Rosberg	Mercedes	1:38.418	1:38.031	1:37.679	4
6	3	(Spain) Fernando Alonso	Ferrari	1:38.520	1:37.978	1:38.038	5
7	4	(Brazil) Felipe Massa	Ferrari	1:38.884	1:38.295	1:38.223	6
8	11	(Germany) Nico Hülkenberg	Sauber-Ferrari	1:38.427	1:37.913	1:38.237	7
9	12	(Mexico) Esteban Gutiérrez	Sauber-Ferrari	1:38.725	1:38.327	1:38.405	8
10	7	(Finland) Kimi Räikkönen	Lotus-Renault	1:38.341	1:38.181	1:38.822	9
11	6	(Mexico) Sergio Pérez	McLaren-Mercedes	1:39.049	1:38.362		10
12	5	(United Kingdom) Jenson Button	McLaren-Mercedes	1:38.882	1:38.365		11
13	19	(Australia) Daniel Ricciardo	Toro Rosso-Ferrari	1:38.525	1:38.417		12
14	15	(Germany) Adrian Sutil	Force India-Mercedes	1:38.988	1:38.431		14
15	14	(United Kingdom) Paul di Resta	Force India-Mercedes	1:39.185	1:38.718		15
16	18	(France) Jean-Éric Vergne	Toro Rosso-Ferrari	1:39.075	1:38.781		16
17	17	(Finland) Valtteri Bottas	Williams-Renault	1:39.470			17
18	16	(Venezuela) Pastor Maldonado	Williams-Renault	1:39.987			18
19	20	(France) Charles Pic	Caterham-Renault	1:40.864			19
20	21	(Netherlands) Giedo van der Garde	Caterham-Renault	1:40.871			20
21	22	(France) Jules Bianchi	Marussia-Cosworth	1:41.169			22^{2}
22	23	(United Kingdom) Max Chilton	Marussia-Cosworth	1:41.322			21
107% time:1:45.224

Notes:
^1 – Mark Webber received a ten-place grid penalty after receiving his 3rd reprimand of the season, for hitching a ride back to the pits on Fernando Alonso's Ferrari at the previous race. ^2 – Jules Bianchi received a three-place grid penalty and a reprimand after impeding Paul di Resta while on an out-lap.

=== Race ===
Pos.	No.	Driver	Constructor	Laps	Time/Retired	Grid	Points
1	1	(Germany) Sebastian Vettel	Red Bull-Renault	55	1:43:13.701	1	25
2	7	(Finland) Kimi Räikkönen	Lotus-Renault	55	+4.224	9	18
3	8	(France) Romain Grosjean	Lotus-Renault	55	+4.927	3	15
4	11	(Germany) Nico Hülkenberg	Sauber-Ferrari	55	+24.114	7	12
5	10	(United Kingdom) Lewis Hamilton	Mercedes	55	+25.255	2	10
6	3	(Spain) Fernando Alonso	Ferrari	55	+26.189	5	8
7	9	(Germany) Nico Rosberg	Mercedes	55	+26.698	4	6
8	5	(United Kingdom) Jenson Button	McLaren-Mercedes	55	+32.262	11	4
9	4	(Brazil) Felipe Massa	Ferrari	55	+34.390	6	2
10	6	(Mexico) Sergio Pérez	McLaren-Mercedes	55	+35.155	10	1
11	12	(Mexico) Esteban Gutiérrez	Sauber-Ferrari	55	+35.990	8	
12	17	(Finland) Valtteri Bottas	Williams-Renault	55	+47.049	17	
13	16	(Venezuela) Pastor Maldonado	Williams-Renault	55	+50.013	18	
14	20	(France) Charles Pic	Caterham-Renault	55	+1:03.578	19	
15	21	(Netherlands) Giedo van der Garde	Caterham-Renault	55	+1:04.501	20	
16	22	(France) Jules Bianchi	Marussia-Cosworth	55	+1:07.970	22	
17	23	(United Kingdom) Max Chilton	Marussia-Cosworth	55	+1:12.898	21	
18	18	(France) Jean-Éric Vergne	Toro Rosso-Ferrari	53	Brakes^{3}	16	
19	19	(Australia) Daniel Ricciardo	Toro Rosso-Ferrari	52	Brakes^{3}	12	
20	15	(Germany) Adrian Sutil	Force India-Mercedes	50	Collision damage^{3}	14	
Ret	2	(Australia) Mark Webber	Red Bull-Renault	36	Collision/Fire	13	
Ret	14	(United Kingdom) Paul di Resta	Force India-Mercedes	24	Accident	15	

Notes

- ^3 — Jean-Éric Vergne, Daniel Ricciardo and Adrian Sutil failed to finish the race but were classified as they completed over 90% of the race.

== Championship standings after the race ==
Drivers' Championship standings

	Pos.	Driver	Points
	1	(Germany) Sebastian Vettel*	272
	2	(Spain) Fernando Alonso*	195
1	3	(Finland) Kimi Räikkönen*	167
1	4	(United Kingdom) Lewis Hamilton*	161
	5	(Australia) Mark Webber	130

Constructors' Championship standings

Pos.	Constructor	Points
1	(Austria) Red Bull-Renault*	402
2	(Italy) Ferrari*	284
3	(Germany) Mercedes*	283
4	(United Kingdom) Lotus-Renault*	239
5	(United Kingdom) McLaren-Mercedes	81

- Note: Only the top five positions are included for both sets of standings.
- Bold text and an asterisk shows drivers or teams that still had a mathematical chance of winning the championship.

Previous race: 2013 Singapore Grand Prix	FIA Formula One World Championship; 2013 season	Next race: 2013 Japanese Grand Prix
Previous race: 2012 Korean Grand Prix	Korean Grand Prix	Next race: N/A
