= 2018 TCR Korea Touring Car Series =

The 2018 TCR Korea Touring Car Series is the first season of the TCR Korea Touring Car Series. The series supported the TCR Asia Series for their inaugural round held at Korea International Circuit in August.

== Teams and drivers ==
All teams were Korean registered. All drivers, excepting German driver Peter Terting, raced under South Korean racing license.

Team	Car	No.	Drivers	Rounds
DreamRacer Racing Team	Honda Civic Type R TCR (FK8)	1	(South Korea) Kim Byoung Hyun	1
KMSA Motorsport	Hyundai i30 N TCR	3	(South Korea) Kang Dong Woo	1, 3
E-Rain Motorsport	Hyundai i30 N TCR	16	(South Korea) Lee Do Hyeon	1
E-Rain Motorsport	Hyundai i30 N TCR	19	(South Korea) Noh Dong Gi	2–3
E-Rain Motorsport	Volkswagen Golf GTI TCR	20	(South Korea) Andrew Kim	2–3
Brand New Racing	Volkswagen Golf GTI TCR	20	(South Korea) Andrew Kim	1
Brand New Racing	Volkswagen Golf GTI TCR	85	(South Korea) Jung Nam Su	2–3
Indigo Racing	Hyundai i30 N TCR	87	(South Korea) Charlie Kang	All
Indigo Racing	Hyundai i30 N TCR	97	(South Korea) Cho Hoon Hyun	1–2
Indigo Racing	Hyundai i30 N TCR	99	(South Korea) Kim Jin Soo	3
Entries ineligible to score points
Hyundai Motorsport N	Hyundai i30 N TCR	30	(Germany) Peter Terting	3

== Calendar and results ==
The provisional calendar was released on 5 February 2018, with all rounds being held within South Korea.

Rnd.		Circuit	Date	Pole position	Fastest lap	Winning driver	Winning team	Supporting
1	1	Korea International Circuit, Yeongam	25–26 August	(South Korea) Kang Byung Hui	(South Korea) Andrew Kim	(South Korea) Andrew Kim	BrandNew Racing	TCR Asia Series
1	2	Korea International Circuit, Yeongam	25–26 August		(South Korea) Charlie Kang	(South Korea) Charlie Kang	Indigo Racing	TCR Asia Series
2	3	Inje Speedium, Inje	29–30 September	(South Korea) Noh Dong Gi	(South Korea) Andrew Kim	(South Korea) Charlie Kang	Indigo Racing	
2	4	Inje Speedium, Inje	29–30 September		(South Korea) Andrew Kim	(South Korea) Jung Nam Su	Brand New Racing	
3	5	Korea International Circuit, Yeongam	3–4 November	(South Korea) Kim Jin Soo (Note: Actual pole position was taken by guest driver Peter Terting.)	(South Korea) Charlie Kang (Note: Actual fastest lap of the race was recorded by guest driver Peter Terting.)	(South Korea) Noh Dong Gi	E-Rain Motorsport	
3	6	Korea International Circuit, Yeongam	3–4 November		(South Korea) Charlie Kang (Note: Actual fastest lap of the race was recorded by guest driver Peter Terting.)	(South Korea) Kim Jin Soo	Indigo Racing	

== Championship standings ==
=== Drivers' championship ===
Pos.	Driver	KIC1		INJ		KIC2		Pts.
Pos.	Driver	RD1	RD2	RD1	RD2	RD1	RD2	Pts.
1	(South Korea) Charlie Kang	**4**	1	1	3	4	3	108
2	(South Korea) Andrew Kim	1	4	2	2	2	Ret	102
3	(South Korea) Jung Nam Su			3	**1**	6	2	75
4	(South Korea) Noh Dong Gi			4	5	1	5	65
5	(South Korea) Cho Hoon Hyun	3	5	5	4			52
6	(South Korea) Kim Jin Soo					5	1	45
7	(South Korea) Kim Byoung Hyun	2	3					34
8	(South Korea) Kang Dong Woo	Ret	**2**			Ret	Ret	23
9	(South Korea) Lee Do Hyeon	5	6					18
Drivers ineligible to score points
	(Germany) Peter Terting					**3**	**4**	-
Pos.	Driver	KIC1		INJ		KIC2		Pts.

Colour	Result
Gold	Winner
Silver	Second place
Bronze	Third place
Green	Points classification
Blue	Non-points classification
Blue	Non-classified finish (NC)
Purple	Retired, not classified (Ret)
Red	Did not qualify (DNQ)
Red	Did not pre-qualify (DNPQ)
Black	Disqualified (DSQ)
White	Did not start (DNS)
White	Withdrew (WD)
White	Race cancelled (C)
Blank	Did not practice (DNP)
Blank	Did not arrive (DNA)
Blank	Excluded (EX)

**Bold** – Pole

Italics – Fastest Lap
