= 2011 Korean Grand Prix =

Race 16 of 19 in the 2011 Formula One World Championship
← Previous race	Next race →

Race details
- Date: 16 October 2011
- Official name: 2011 Formula 1 Korean Grand Prix
- Location: Yeongam, South Jeolla, South Korea
- Course: Korea International Circuit
- Course length: 5.621 km (3.493 miles)
- Distance: 55 laps, 309.155 km (192.100 miles)
- Weather: Dry, light rain at the start Air Temp 21 °C (70 °F)
- Attendance: 84,000

Pole position
Driver	(United Kingdom) Lewis Hamilton	McLaren-Mercedes
- Time: 1:35.820

Fastest lap
Driver	(Germany) Sebastian Vettel	Red Bull Racing-Renault
- Time: 1:39.605 on lap 55 (lap record) (Note: Although Lewis Hamilton set a lap time of 1:35.820 in qualifying, Sebastian Vettel's time of 1:39.605 is recognised as the lap record as it was set under race conditions.)

Podium
First	(Germany) Sebastian Vettel	Red Bull Racing-Renault
Second	(United Kingdom) Lewis Hamilton	McLaren-Mercedes
Third	(Australia) Mark Webber	Red Bull Racing-Renault

The 2011 Korean Grand Prix, formally the 2011 Formula 1 Korean Grand Prix was a Formula One motor race that was held on 16 October 2011 at the Korea International Circuit in Yeongam, South Jeolla, South Korea. It was the sixteenth round of the 2011 Formula One season, the second running of the Korean Grand Prix, and the first race after Sebastian Vettel claimed the 2011 World Drivers' Championship.

The 55-lap race was won by Vettel, after starting from second on the grid. Lewis Hamilton finished in second place for McLaren, and Mark Webber completed the podium in third position. As a consequence of the race, podium finishes for both Vettel and Webber ensured that Red Bull Racing defended their World Constructors' Championship title, extending their lead to 140 points over McLaren, with only 129 points available at the final three races.

Polesitter Hamilton broke Red Bull's streak of pole positions, which had started at the 2010 Abu Dhabi Grand Prix, and continued for another 15 races. Prior to this race, the last time Red Bull failed to take pole was at the 2010 Brazilian Grand Prix, when Nico Hülkenberg, driving for Williams, was the polesitter.

== Report ==
=== Background ===
The FIA announced that former Lotus driver, Martin Donnelly, would be the drivers' representative on the stewards panel for the weekend. Formula Renault 3.5 Series runner-up Jean-Éric Vergne drove for Toro Rosso during free practice, after announcing a deal to run in Friday practice in Korea, Abu Dhabi and Brazil.

With Sebastian Vettel clinching the 2011 championship title at the Japanese Grand Prix, four drivers remained in contention for the runner-up position behind Vettel. Jenson Button, the winner in Japan, held an eight-point lead over Fernando Alonso, with Mark Webber a further eight points behind, and Lewis Hamilton another sixteen back in fifth place. Red Bull Racing entered the race weekend with the opportunity of winning the Constructors' Championship for the second consecutive season.

With the World Drivers' Championship settled in Japan, Pirelli promised an "aggressive" tyre selection for the final four races of the season, with motorsport director Paul Hembery predicting four-stop strategies throughout the race.

Tyre supplier Pirelli brought its yellow-banded soft compound tyre as the harder "prime" tyre and the red-banded super-soft compound as the softer "option" compound, as opposed to the previous year where Bridgestone brought the silver-banded hard compound as the prime.

A single DRS (Drag Reduction System) Zone was used in the Korean race. The detection point was located 30m after the first turn, while the DRS activation point was halfway (516m after turn 2) in between turn 2 and 3, down the long straight. Hence, the DRS was used for maximising top speed rather than acceleration.

Following a collision between Jaime Alguersuari and Nico Rosberg during the second free practice session in which Rosberg made contact with Alguersuari as the Toro Rosso driver emerged from the pit lane, a system of warning lights was installed on the approach to the first turn. Following the accident, Ferrari drivers Fernando Alonso and Felipe Massa called for the pit exit to be reconfigured in future so as to prevent similar incidents from occurring. Nico Rosberg and Jenson Button almost had a collision coming out of the pit lane. It involved the two cars sharing the pit lane to get out in one piece. Rosberg managed to get out first but was overtaken by Button. Button was then taken over by Rosberg again.

The Grand Prix was the 700th in which the McLaren team competed.

=== Qualifying ===
Lewis Hamilton stopped Red Bull's run of 16 consecutive pole positions by setting the fastest time in Saturday's qualifying session. It was his first pole since the 2010 Canadian Grand Prix. Sebastian Vettel was still on the front row of the grid because his final flying lap was not good enough to beat Hamilton's time but still left him in second position. Jenson Button was three tenths slower than teammate Hamilton, but only a tenth slower than Vettel. The second Red Bull of Mark Webber lined up fourth, in front of the two Ferraris, where Felipe Massa had out-qualified Fernando Alonso for the fourth time in six races. Nico Rosberg, Vitaly Petrov and the Force Indias of Paul di Resta and Adrian Sutil completed the top ten, after all making the third part of qualifying. Jaime Alguersuari and Sébastien Buemi did well to qualify an unusually high eleventh and thirteenth for the Toro Rosso team. The Mercedes of Michael Schumacher was only twelfth, in between them. Kamui Kobayashi, Bruno Senna, Pastor Maldonado and Sergio Pérez were the other drivers who made it into Q2, filling spaces 14 to 17 on the grid in that order. This meant that Rubens Barrichello could not qualify higher than eighteenth. The three new teams completed the back of the grid; Heikki Kovalainen out-qualified Jarno Trulli at Lotus, Timo Glock was faster than Jérôme d'Ambrosio at Virgin and Daniel Ricciardo failed to set a lap time due to electrical problems, but would be allowed start twenty-fourth and behind HRT teammate, Vitantonio Liuzzi.

=== Race ===
The race started with contact at the back, between a Sauber and the Toro Rosso of Sébastien Buemi. Vettel positioned his car behind Hamilton to pick up the slipstream from his car, in order to move close enough to make a passing manoeuvre, and passed Hamilton for the lead at Turn 4. In the meantime, Massa had moved up to third position, passing both Webber and Button. Into turn 4, Button tried to pass Massa around the outside of the turn, but both drivers were delayed enough to allow Webber to pass them both, and Alonso further displaced Button through turn 6. At the end of the lap, Liuzzi was forced to pit, to replace a damaged front wing. On lap 14, there was a pit stop battle between Button and Rosberg. They entered the pits, Button ahead, and Rosberg emerged from his box ahead of Button, after a quicker pit stop. When the pair exited the pits, Rosberg braked too late, and Button passed him. Rosberg then deployed his DRS, and would pass Button again, before Button reversed the move the following lap.

On lap 17, there was a crash between Petrov and Schumacher, causing both cars to retire with damage, and the safety car to be deployed. Petrov and Alonso had been battling over track position on the straight, but both missed the braking zone, and Petrov rammed into the back of Schumacher, damaging Schumacher's rear wing. Petrov was later given a five-place grid penalty for the Indian Grand Prix, for causing an avoidable collision. The safety car came in on lap 20, where Vettel extended his lead once again. On lap 27, Rosberg was defending fifth place, from Massa and Alonso, but Rosberg missed his braking point and lost track position to them both. Pastor Maldonado was given a drive-through penalty for entering the pit lane too fast, and later retired due to a clutch problem. On lap 33, the battle for second place between Hamilton and Webber saw both drivers pit, with Hamilton returning to the track ahead. Webber dived up the inside of Hamilton to take second place at Turn 6. Hamilton continued alongside Webber on the run to the next corner, and Webber had to yield, thus handing the place back to Hamilton.

Later in the race Ferrari pitted Massa, but Alonso decided to stay out, consequently leading the race for a few laps. This worked out best for Alonso, because Massa was held up in traffic, and Alonso was not. Later on, after Alonso had pitted, Alonso was closing in on the cars ahead. He caught up with only a few laps to spare, setting a fastest lap on the way. Alonso then came on the radio saying "I give up. I give up." It was later revealed that he meant he had arrived too late, and there was nothing he could do, so he kept fifth. Vettel took his tenth victory of the season, ahead of Hamilton – who took his first podium since the German Grand Prix – and Webber, the latter's result ensuring that Red Bull Racing became 2011 Constructors' World Champion with three races remaining. Button was fourth, and Alonso finished fifth, followed by Massa, Alguersuari, Rosberg, Buemi and di Resta, who completed the points scoring positions. Buemi scored his last career points and the last for a Swiss driver in Formula One.

== Classification ==
=== Qualifying ===
Pos	No	Driver	Constructor	Part 1	Part 2	Part 3	Grid
1	3	(United Kingdom) Lewis Hamilton	McLaren-Mercedes	1:37.525	1:36.526	1:35.820	1
2	1	(Germany) Sebastian Vettel	Red Bull Racing-Renault	1:39.093	1:37.285	1:36.042	2
3	4	(United Kingdom) Jenson Button	McLaren-Mercedes	1:37.929	1:37.302	1:36.126	3
4	2	(Australia) Mark Webber	Red Bull Racing-Renault	1:39.071	1:37.292	1:36.468	4
5	6	(Brazil) Felipe Massa	Ferrari	1:38.670	1:37.313	1:36.831	5
6	5	(Spain) Fernando Alonso	Ferrari	1:38.393	1:37.352	1:36.980	6
7	8	(Germany) Nico Rosberg	Mercedes	1:38.426	1:37.892	1:37.754	7
8	10	(Russia) Vitaly Petrov	Renault	1:38.378	1:38.186	1:38.124	8
9	15	(United Kingdom) Paul di Resta	Force India-Mercedes	1:38.549	1:38.254	no time	9
10	14	(Germany) Adrian Sutil	Force India-Mercedes	1:38.789	1:38.219	no time	10
11	19	(Spain) Jaime Alguersuari	Toro Rosso-Ferrari	1:39.392	1:38.315		11
12	7	(Germany) Michael Schumacher	Mercedes	1:38.502	1:38.354		12
13	18	(Switzerland) Sébastien Buemi	Toro Rosso-Ferrari	1:39.352	1:38.508		13
14	16	(Japan) Kamui Kobayashi	Sauber-Ferrari	1:39.464	1:38.775		14
15	9	(Brazil) Bruno Senna	Renault	1:39.316	1:38.791		15
16	12	(Venezuela) Pastor Maldonado	Williams-Cosworth	1:39.436	1:39.189		16
17	17	(Mexico) Sergio Pérez	Sauber-Ferrari	1:39.097	1:39.443		17
18	11	(Brazil) Rubens Barrichello	Williams-Cosworth	1:39.538			18
19	20	(Finland) Heikki Kovalainen	Lotus-Renault	1:40.522			19
20	21	(Italy) Jarno Trulli	Lotus-Renault	1:41.101			20
21	24	(Germany) Timo Glock	Virgin-Cosworth	1:42.091			21
22	25	(Belgium) Jérôme d'Ambrosio	Virgin-Cosworth	1:43.483			22
23	23	(Italy) Vitantonio Liuzzi	HRT-Cosworth	1:43.758			23
107% time: 1:44.351
24	22	(Australia) Daniel Ricciardo	HRT-Cosworth	no time			24

=== Race ===
Pos	No	Driver	Constructor	Laps	Time/Retired	Grid	Points
1	1	(Germany) Sebastian Vettel	Red Bull Racing-Renault	55	1:38:01.994	2	25
2	3	(United Kingdom) Lewis Hamilton	McLaren-Mercedes	55	+12.019	1	18
3	2	(Australia) Mark Webber	Red Bull Racing-Renault	55	+12.477	4	15
4	4	(United Kingdom) Jenson Button	McLaren-Mercedes	55	+14.694	3	12
5	5	(Spain) Fernando Alonso	Ferrari	55	+15.689	6	10
6	6	(Brazil) Felipe Massa	Ferrari	55	+25.133	5	8
7	19	(Spain) Jaime Alguersuari	Toro Rosso-Ferrari	55	+49.538	11	6
8	8	(Germany) Nico Rosberg	Mercedes	55	+54.053	7	4
9	18	(Switzerland) Sébastien Buemi	Toro Rosso-Ferrari	55	+1:02.762	13	2
10	15	(United Kingdom) Paul di Resta	Force India-Mercedes	55	+1:03.602	9	1
11	14	(Germany) Adrian Sutil	Force India-Mercedes	55	+1:11.229	10	
12	11	(Brazil) Rubens Barrichello	Williams-Cosworth	55	+1:33.068	18	
13	9	(Brazil) Bruno Senna	Renault	54	+1 Lap	15	
14	20	(Finland) Heikki Kovalainen	Lotus-Renault	54	+1 Lap	19	
15	16	(Japan) Kamui Kobayashi	Sauber-Ferrari	54	+1 Lap	14	
16	17	(Mexico) Sergio Pérez	Sauber-Ferrari	54	+1 Lap	17	
17	21	(Italy) Jarno Trulli	Lotus-Renault	54	+1 Lap	20	
18	24	(Germany) Timo Glock	Virgin-Cosworth	54	+1 Lap	21	
19	22	(Australia) Daniel Ricciardo	HRT-Cosworth	54	+1 Lap	24	
20	25	(Belgium) Jérôme d'Ambrosio	Virgin-Cosworth	54	+1 Lap	22	
21	23	(Italy) Vitantonio Liuzzi	HRT-Cosworth	52	+3 Laps	23	
Ret	12	(Venezuela) Pastor Maldonado	Williams-Cosworth	30	Clutch	16	
Ret	10	(Russia) Vitaly Petrov	Renault	16	Collision damage	8	
Ret	7	(Germany) Michael Schumacher	Mercedes	15	Collision	12	

== Championship standings after the race ==
Drivers' Championship standings

Pos.	Driver	Points
1	(Germany) **Sebastian Vettel**	349
2	(United Kingdom) Jenson Button	222
3	(Spain) Fernando Alonso	212
4	(Australia) Mark Webber	209
5	(United Kingdom) Lewis Hamilton	196

Constructors' Championship standings

Pos.	Constructor	Points
1	(Austria) **Red Bull Racing-Renault**	558
2	(United Kingdom) McLaren-Mercedes	418
3	(Italy) Ferrari	310
4	(Germany) Mercedes	127
5	(United Kingdom) Renault	72

- Note: Only the top five positions are included for both sets of standings.
- **Bold text** indicates the 2011 World Champions.

== Footnotes ==
Previous race: 2011 Japanese Grand Prix	FIA Formula One World Championship; 2011 season	Next race: 2011 Indian Grand Prix
Previous race: 2010 Korean Grand Prix	Korean Grand Prix	Next race: 2012 Korean Grand Prix
