= 2012 Indian Grand Prix =

Race 17 of 20 in the 2012 Formula One World Championship
← Previous race	Next race →

Race details
- Date: 28 October 2012
- Official name: 2012 Formula 1 Airtel Indian Grand Prix
- Location: Buddh International Circuit; Greater Noida, Uttar Pradesh, India
- Course: Permanent racing facility
- Course length: 5.125 km (3.185 miles)
- Distance: 60 laps, 307.249 km (190.916 miles)
- Weather: Fine, Dry, a little hazy and a little dusty Air Temp 30 °C (86 °F) Track Temp 36 °C (97 °F) dropping to 31 °C (88 °F)
- Attendance: 65,000

Pole position
Driver	(Germany) Sebastian Vettel	Red Bull-Renault
- Time: 1:25.283

Fastest lap
Driver	(United Kingdom) Jenson Button	McLaren-Mercedes
- Time: 1:28.203 on lap 60

Podium
First	(Germany) Sebastian Vettel	Red Bull-Renault
Second	(Spain) Fernando Alonso	Ferrari
Third	(Australia) Mark Webber	Red Bull-Renault

The 2012 Indian Grand Prix (formally known as the 2012 Formula 1 Airtel Indian Grand Prix) was a Formula One motor race held on 28 October 2012 at the Buddh International Circuit in Greater Noida, Uttar Pradesh, India. The race was the seventeenth round of the 2012 championship, and marked the second running of the Indian Grand Prix.

Sebastian Vettel started the race from pole position. Vettel won the race for the second consecutive year, but despite leading every lap of the race, he was denied a Grand Slam when Jenson Button set the fastest lap of the race. The organisers of the race invited sport shooter Gagan Narang, who won a bronze medal for India at the London Olympics, to wave the chequered flag. Fernando Alonso and Mark Webber completed the podium by finishing second and third.

His fourth consecutive win enabled Vettel to increase his advantage over Alonso to 16 points heading into the final three rounds of the season. While Räikkönen remained third with 173 points, Webber overtook Hamilton for fourth in the standings, meaning that the three drivers behind Vettel and Alonso were only covered by eight points. Despite their big deficit towards Vettel, all of the top five drivers still remained in contention of winning the Drivers' Championship. Meanwhile, Lotus was mathematically eliminated from contention regarding the Constructors' Championship, whilst Red Bull increased the gap to Ferrari to 91 points, with 129 points remaining.

== Report ==
=== Background ===
Sergio Pérez was taken ill ahead of the race, forcing Sauber to run test and reserve driver Esteban Gutiérrez in his place for the first free practice session. Pérez was able to return to the car for the second practice session. Valtteri Bottas once again ran in place of Bruno Senna at Williams, while Giedo van der Garde drove Heikki Kovalainen's Caterham.

Ferrari was the centre of controversy over the course of the weekend when they displayed the flag of the Italian Navy on the nose of the F2012 in support of the Italian sailors held by Indian authorities over a shooting incident that resulted in the deaths of two Indian fishermen in February 2012.

Tyre supplier Pirelli brought its silver-banded hard compound tyre as the harder "prime" tyre and the yellow-banded soft compound tyre as the softer "option" tyre.

Following track invasions by stray dogs in 2011, race organisers took precautions by installing ultrasonic devices around the circuit to deter animals from accessing the circuit.

=== Free practice ===
The first practice session was run without incident. Sebastian Vettel set the fastest time, despite having spent most of the ninety minutes of the session in his garage. Jenson Button was second, three-tenths of a second behind Vettel, with Fernando Alonso in third, a further tenth of a second behind. Vettel was fastest in the second session as well, setting a time one tenth of a second faster than teammate Mark Webber and six-tenths of a second faster than Fernando Alonso. The under-used surface of the circuit caused problems for several drivers, with Felipe Massa, Romain Grosjean, and Bruno Senna all spinning throughout the session, though all three were able to continue running without forcing the suspension of the session. Vettel was once again fastest in the third practice session, two-tenths faster than Button and Webber.

=== Qualifying ===
Force India ensured that their cars were first on track for the first part of Saturday's qualifying session. Kimi Räikkönen, Felipe Massa and Bruno Senna set the early pace while the Red Bulls and McLarens stayed in the garage waiting for the track to become more grippy once rubber had been laid down. Ferrari attempted to improve Fernando Alonso's lap time by making Massa run in front of him on the straight so he could use the slipstream to gain extra top speed. Alonso's lap, however, was not faster than Massa's and the drafting idea was not used later in qualifying, presumably because it did not work. Massa was on a quick lap after this, but accelerated too much out of a corner and spun his car around; he recovered and returned to the pits. Once the Red Bulls and McLarens had set their lap times, the Toro Rosso of Jean-Éric Vergne was left in eighteenth and therefore not within the top seventeen slots times required to make the next qualifying session. He set a lap time, but it was only good enough to move up one place. His teammate, Daniel Ricciardo, was the driver who progressed to Q2 himself when he pushed Vergne back into the eighteenth qualifying slot. Once again, the Caterhams, Marrusias and HRTs occupied the three final rows of the grid. Vitaly Petrov, whose car had needed some last-minute repair just before the session had begun, qualified in nineteenth place and his teammate Heikki Kovalainen ended up twentieth after spinning the car round on his final lap and running back across the track before getting stuck in the gravel. Narain Karthikeyan qualified in twenty-third place for his home Grand Prix, just one-thousandth of a second slower than Pedro de la Rosa. The Marussia cars of Timo Glock and Charles Pic ended up twenty-first and twenty-fourth, and last, respectively. Every car excluding the Red Bulls, McLarens, Ferraris and Lotuses used the softer compound 'option' tyre in the session. Williams driver Pastor Maldonado set the session's fastest time.

The second part of qualifying began under yellow flag conditions because Kovalainen's stricken Caterham was still being returned to the pits. Every driver set a time not long after the flag had been lifted, and many returned to the pits not long after this. There was a flurry of lap times being set at the end of the session, and it was not certain which drivers had made it through until after the chequered flag was waved as every driver but Vettel, Webber and Hamilton came back on track. Kamui Kobayashi qualified his Sauber in a disappointing seventeenth place, while his teammate made it into the final session of qualifying. It was the same story for Romain Grosjean, Bruno Senna and Michael Schumacher who all failed to make Q3 after their teammates did. They lined up on the grid in 11th, 13th and 14th respectively. The Force India team was disappointed at their home race, with Nico Hülkenberg and Paul di Resta only taking the twelfth and sixteenth spots on the grid respectively. At least one of their two drivers had qualified within the top ten at each of the last ten races. Daniel Ricciardo out-qualified Vergne for the thirteenth time in 2012, putting his Toro Rosso in fifteenth position on the grid. Jenson Button completed the final lap of the session to give himself the second fastest time behind Vettel.

Seven teams were represented in Q3, but the Mercedes of Nico Rosberg elected not to run and consequently took tenth place on the grid. Sergio Pérez and Pastor Maldonado did well to qualify their cars in eighth and ninth positions; the Lotus of Räikkönen was in front of them in seventh. The session was split into two informal phases, with cars choosing to make two attempts at a good time. Sebastian Vettel made a mistake on his first flying lap and ran across turn 7, but he set a lap worthy of pole position on his following attempt. Mark Webber set a lap half a tenth slower, initially in front of Button, Alonso and Hamilton. Both Red Bulls abandoned their laps at the very end of the session, as Vettel set a too-slow first sector, and Webber ran wide at turn 3 whilst running behind the McLarens. Vettel took pole position for Red Bull's third consecutive front-row lock-out. It was the first time Red Bull had had three front-row lock-outs in a row, and the first time any team had done since McLaren did in 2007. Lewis Hamilton set the last lap of qualifying to move his car up to third on the grid, only two-tenths behind Webber. Button qualified fourth in front of Vettel's main title rival Alonso and Massa qualified sixth. This meant that the cars lined up two by two, with Red Bulls taking the front row, McLaren taking the second and Ferrari taking the third. It was only the third time in the 2012 season that no penalties needed to be applied before the start of the race.

=== Race ===
Sebastian Vettel took a dominant win, which was his 4th consecutive one ahead of Ferrari's Fernando Alonso who got past Mark Webber when the latter suffered from a KERS problem in his Red Bull. Lewis Hamilton closed up to Webber but couldn't get past and had to settle for 4th place. After this race Vettel extended his Championship lead to 13 points over Alonso.

=== Post race controversies ===
There was speculation in the media that the chaotic Indian customs regulations might have cost Fernando Alonso the race. This was because Ferrari could not get certain crucial auto parts and equipment flown into India because of the complex paperwork associated with Indian customs.

A significant drop in race day attendance was noticed, as the number of fans attending the race dropped to 65,000 (from 95,000 in the previous year). Formula One president Bernie Ecclestone stated that he was not worried and that attendance is always high in the first year and tends to go down in the second.

There was also some discontent between Ferrari technical director Pat Fry and Alonso, when Fry stated on Twitter that "In order to be where we wanted and where we were capable of being, we needed to be perfect today and we weren't", after Alonso qualified fifth behind the Red Bulls and the McLarens. Alonso apparently took this as a jibe against his driving skills, and the Ferrari management had to prevent him from responding to it publicly.

== Classification ==
=== Qualifying ===
Pos.	No.	Driver	Constructor	Part 1	Part 2	Part 3	Grid
1	1	(Germany) Sebastian Vettel	Red Bull-Renault	1:26.387	1:25.435	1:25.283	1
2	2	(Australia) Mark Webber	Red Bull-Renault	1:26.744	1:25.610	1:25.327	2
3	4	(United Kingdom) Lewis Hamilton	McLaren-Mercedes	1:26.516	1:25.816	1:25.544	3
4	3	(United Kingdom) Jenson Button	McLaren-Mercedes	1:26.564	1:25.467	1:25.649	4
5	5	(Spain) Fernando Alonso	Ferrari	1:26.829	1:25.834	1:25.773	5
6	6	(Brazil) Felipe Massa	Ferrari	1:26.939	1:26.111	1:25.857	6
7	9	(Finland) Kimi Räikkönen	Lotus-Renault	1:26.740	1:26.101	1:26.236	7
8	15	(Mexico) Sergio Pérez	Sauber-Ferrari	1:27.179	1:26.076	1:26.360	8
9	18	(Venezuela) Pastor Maldonado	Williams-Renault	1:26.048	1:25.983	1:26.713	9
10	8	(Germany) Nico Rosberg	Mercedes	1:26.458	1:25.976	No time	10
11	10	(France) Romain Grosjean	Lotus-Renault	1:26.897	1:26.136		11
12	12	(Germany) Nico Hülkenberg	Force India-Mercedes	1:27.185	1:26.241		12
13	19	(Brazil) Bruno Senna	Williams-Renault	1:26.851	1:26.331		13
14	7	(Germany) Michael Schumacher	Mercedes	1:27.482	1:26.574		14
15	16	(Australia) Daniel Ricciardo	Toro Rosso-Ferrari	1:27.006	1:26.777		15
16	11	(United Kingdom) Paul di Resta	Force India-Mercedes	1:27.462	1:26.989		16
17	14	(Japan) Kamui Kobayashi	Sauber-Ferrari	1:27.517	1:27.219		17
18	17	(France) Jean-Éric Vergne	Toro Rosso-Ferrari	1:27.525			18
19	21	(Russia) Vitaly Petrov	Caterham-Renault	1:28.756			19
20	20	(Finland) Heikki Kovalainen	Caterham-Renault	1:29.500			20
21	24	(Germany) Timo Glock	Marussia-Cosworth	1:29.613			21
22	22	(Spain) Pedro de la Rosa	HRT-Cosworth	1:30.592			22
23	23	(India) Narain Karthikeyan	HRT-Cosworth	1:30.593			23
24	25	(France) Charles Pic	Marussia-Cosworth	1:30.662			24
107% time:1:32.071

=== Race ===
Pos	No	Driver	Constructor	Laps	Time/Retired	Grid	Points
1	1	(Germany) Sebastian Vettel	Red Bull-Renault	60	1:31:10.744	1	25
2	5	(Spain) Fernando Alonso	Ferrari	60	+9.437	5	18
3	2	(Australia) Mark Webber	Red Bull-Renault	60	+13.217	2	15
4	4	(United Kingdom) Lewis Hamilton	McLaren-Mercedes	60	+13.909	3	12
5	3	(United Kingdom) Jenson Button	McLaren-Mercedes	60	+26.266	4	10
6	6	(Brazil) Felipe Massa	Ferrari	60	+44.674	6	8
7	9	(Finland) Kimi Räikkönen	Lotus-Renault	60	+45.227	7	6
8	12	(Germany) Nico Hülkenberg	Force India-Mercedes	60	+54.998	12	4
9	10	(France) Romain Grosjean	Lotus-Renault	60	+56.103	11	2
10	19	(Brazil) Bruno Senna	Williams-Renault	60	+1:14.975	13	1
11	8	(Germany) Nico Rosberg	Mercedes	60	+1:21.694	10	
12	11	(United Kingdom) Paul di Resta	Force India-Mercedes	60	+1:22.815	16	
13	16	(Australia) Daniel Ricciardo	Toro Rosso-Ferrari	60	+1:26.064	15	
14	14	(Japan) Kamui Kobayashi	Sauber-Ferrari	60	+1:26.495	17	
15	17	(France) Jean-Éric Vergne	Toro Rosso-Ferrari	59	+1 Lap	18	
16	18	(Venezuela) Pastor Maldonado	Williams-Renault	59	+1 Lap	9	
17	21	(Russia) Vitaly Petrov	Caterham-Renault	59	+1 Lap	19	
18	20	(Finland) Heikki Kovalainen	Caterham-Renault	59	+1 Lap	20	
19	25	(France) Charles Pic	Marussia-Cosworth	59	+1 Lap	24	
20	24	(Germany) Timo Glock	Marussia-Cosworth	58	+2 Laps	21	
21	23	(India) Narain Karthikeyan	HRT-Cosworth	58	+2 Laps	23	
22	7	(Germany) Michael Schumacher	Mercedes	55	Gearbox	14	
Ret	22	(Spain) Pedro de la Rosa	HRT-Cosworth	42	Brakes	22	
Ret	15	(Mexico) Sergio Pérez	Sauber-Ferrari	20	Collision damage	8	

== Championship standings after the race ==
Drivers' Championship standings

	Pos.	Driver	Points
	1	(Germany) **Sebastian Vettel***	240
	2	(Spain) **Fernando Alonso***	227
	3	(Finland) **Kimi Räikkönen***	173
1	4	(Australia) **Mark Webber***	167
1	5	(United Kingdom) **Lewis Hamilton***	165

Constructors' Championship standings

Pos.	Constructor	Points
1	(Austria) **Red Bull-Renault***	407
2	(Italy) **Ferrari***	316
3	(United Kingdom) **McLaren-Mercedes***	306
4	(United Kingdom) Lotus-Renault	263
5	(Germany) Mercedes	136

- Note: Only the top five positions are included for both sets of standings.
- Competitors marked in bold and with an asterisk still had a theoretical chance of becoming World Champion.

Previous race: 2012 Korean Grand Prix	FIA Formula One World Championship; 2012 season	Next race: 2012 Abu Dhabi Grand Prix
Previous race: 2011 Indian Grand Prix	Indian Grand Prix	Next race: 2013 Indian Grand Prix
Awards
Preceded by 2011 Indian Grand Prix	Formula One Promotional Trophy for Race Promoter; 2012	Succeeded by 2013 Brazilian Grand Prix
