= 2013 Singapore Grand Prix =

Race 13 of 19 in the 2013 Formula One World Championship
← Previous race	Next race →
- Marina Bay Street Circuit

Race details
- Date: 22 September 2013
- Official name: 2013 Formula 1 SingTel Singapore Grand Prix
- Location: Marina Bay Street Circuit; Marina Bay, Singapore
- Course: Street circuit
- Course length: 5.065 km (3.147 miles)
- Distance: 61 laps, 308.965 km (191.982 miles)
- Weather: Dry and 29 degrees
- Attendance: 262,527 (3-Day Total); 87,500 (3-Day Average)

Pole position
Driver	(Germany) Sebastian Vettel	Red Bull-Renault
- Time: 1:42.841

Fastest lap
Driver	(Germany) Sebastian Vettel	Red Bull-Renault
- Time: 1:48.574 on lap 46 (lap record)

Podium
First	(Germany) Sebastian Vettel	Red Bull-Renault
Second	(Spain) Fernando Alonso	Ferrari
Third	(Finland) Kimi Räikkönen	Lotus-Renault

The 2013 Singapore Grand Prix (formally known as the 2013 Formula 1 SingTel Singapore Grand Prix) was a Formula One motor race that was held on Sunday, 22 September 2013 at 20:00 SST by the Marina Bay Street Circuit in Marina Bay, Singapore. The race was the thirteenth round of the 2013 season, and marked the 6th running of the night race, the Singapore Grand Prix.

Sebastian Vettel took his most dominant victory statistically. He took pole position, led every lap, scored the fastest lap, and won by more than 32.6 seconds; his third Grand Slam. With a nearly perfect start and good handling of the safety car situation, Fernando Alonso took second position from seventh on the grid. Räikkönen, despite a back injury and a start from 13th, climbed up to the final podium position. Nico Rosberg, who started on the front row alongside Vettel, was caught out by a failed tyre strategy to finish fourth while British teammate Lewis Hamilton followed him home for 5th place. Felipe Massa took sixth, over a minute behind the race winner while Jenson Button slipped down the order in the last few laps to finish seventh with Sergio Pérez, Nico Hülkenberg and Adrian Sutil picking up the final points places. The results meant that Vettel again increased his championship lead to 60 points over Fernando Alonso with Lewis Hamilton a further 36 points behind and Kimi Räikkönen two behind Hamilton's total.

== Background ==
The circuit layout was revised for the 2013 race, with the removal of the "Singapore Sling" chicane at Turn 10. The corner was condensed down to a single change in direction, with the large kerbs that had been used to mark the chicane removed entirely.

Tyre supplier Pirelli brought its white-banded medium compound tyre as the harder "prime" tyre and the red-banded supersoft compound tyre as the softer "option" tyre, as opposed to the previous year where soft and supersoft selection were provided.

== Qualifying ==
Pirelli stated that their supersoft tyres are two seconds faster per lap than their medium compound, which meant that the teams had to establish a good tyre strategy for the weekend. Reigning triple world champion Sebastian Vettel took command in the final two practice sessions, while Lewis Hamilton was the fastest man in the first session. Hamilton's teammate Nico Rosberg and Romain Grosjean were also strong contenders for pole position.

=== Q1 ===
The two Red Bull drivers and Grosjean successfully qualified for the next session with the medium compound tyres, leaving their three sets of supersoft tyres unused for the following two sessions. The two drivers from Caterham and Marussia as well as Pastor Maldonado and Paul di Resta were eliminated during this session.

=== Q2 ===
The biggest surprise of Q2 was the elimination of Lotus's Kimi Räikkönen. It was later revealed that the Finn suffered from a trapped nerve in his lower back on a quite bumpy circuit. Sauber's Esteban Gutiérrez qualified for Q3 for the first time in his young Formula One career. His teammate Nico Hülkenberg was on pace for a Q3 appearance as well, but the German suffered a DRS issue during his final flying lap, resulting in a Q2 exit. It was the first time this season that Hülkenberg could not out-qualify his teammate. Both Mercedes drivers qualified for Q3 on the set of supersoft tyres they previously used in Q1, which means that they joined Vettel, Grosjean and Mark Webber as the drivers who still had two sets of new supersoft tyres for Q3.

=== Q3 ===
The five drivers with two unused sets of supersoft tyres went out on track early in the session for a first flying lap. Vettel was by far the fastest man of that group, lapping in 1:42.841, more than six-tenths of a second faster than Rosberg. As a result, the defending world champion elected to stay in the pits, while the others all went on track, either for a first or a second flying lap, except Esteban Gutiérrez, who opted to save his tyres for the race. What seemed to be a guaranteed pole position for Vettel proved to be very uncertain as the German watched Webber posting the fastest first sector time, quickly followed by successive fastest second sector times by Rosberg and Grosjean. Vettel's time still stood by less than a tenth, ahead of Rosberg and Grosjean. Webber took fourth in front of Hamilton. The Ferrari duo could only manage sixth and seventh, with Felipe Massa in front of Fernando Alonso. Jenson Button had to settle for eighth, while the impressive Daniel Ricciardo posted yet another Q3 appearance with ninth. Gutiérrez started in tenth place after not posting a lap time to save his tyres for the race.

== Race ==
The race began Sunday, 22 September 2013 at 20:00 SST. Sebastian Vettel started from pole ahead of Nico Rosberg with Adrian Sutil the only driver starting on the medium compound 'Prime' tyre.

Rosberg got a better start than Vettel into the first corner but ran wide allowing Vettel back through. Fernando Alonso who started seventh got a good start to move up to third. Vettel gained a five-second advantage over Rosberg in the first three laps and continued to pull away as Rosberg also pulled away from Alonso. Mark Webber overtook Romain Grosjean early on using DRS to move back up to fourth. Lewis Hamilton had a bad start falling behind both Ferraris. He overtook Massa back soon after but the move was deemed to be an illegal overtake by the stewards as it took place off the track, meaning he had to give the position back. After the first few laps Vettel led from Rosberg, Alonso, Webber, Grosjean, Massa, Hamilton, Button, Hülkenberg and Pérez.

Kimi Räikkönen who started 13th and had a bad back quickly moved up the order overtaking Esteban Gutiérrez and Daniel Ricciardo who both started in the top 10. Webber chased down Alonso before being instructed to stay around two seconds behind Alonso so he would not overheat his tyres or engine. The race was then mostly uneventful as Vettel extended his lead to around seven seconds before Räikkönen became the first driver to stop on lap 11. This sparked a chain reaction showing the tyres had not lasted as long as expected. Hamilton jumped Massa in this first round of stops. Paul di Resta kept going until lap 21 before stopping to change his worn option tyres and in doing so slowed down Alonso and allowed Webber, Grosjean and Rosberg to bunch up behind Alonso. Räikkönen used his early stop to move into the points ahead of Hülkenberg, Pérez and Button but at the front Vettel stretched out the lead even further to over 10 seconds until Ricciardo, Vettel's Red Bull teammate for 2014, crashed under the grandstand bringing out the safety car. This meant that the safety car had been used in every Singapore Grand Prix. Shortly after the safety car came in, Grosjean had pneumatic problems in his engine and have to retire after a failed rescuing repair attempt. Vettel quickly pulled away from the rest by about two seconds per lap until he is able to pit without losing the lead. Di Resta was running in 10th before he crashed into the barriers. Webber's car discovered a water leak which slowed him down before it caught fire on the final lap.

== Post-race ==
Alonso stopped in the middle of Turn 7 to pick up Webber, who had retired on the final lap of the race. The stewards gave reprimands to the both of them for their actions. Crucially, Webber earned his third reprimand of the season, thus triggering an automatic 10-place grid penalty at the next race in Korea.

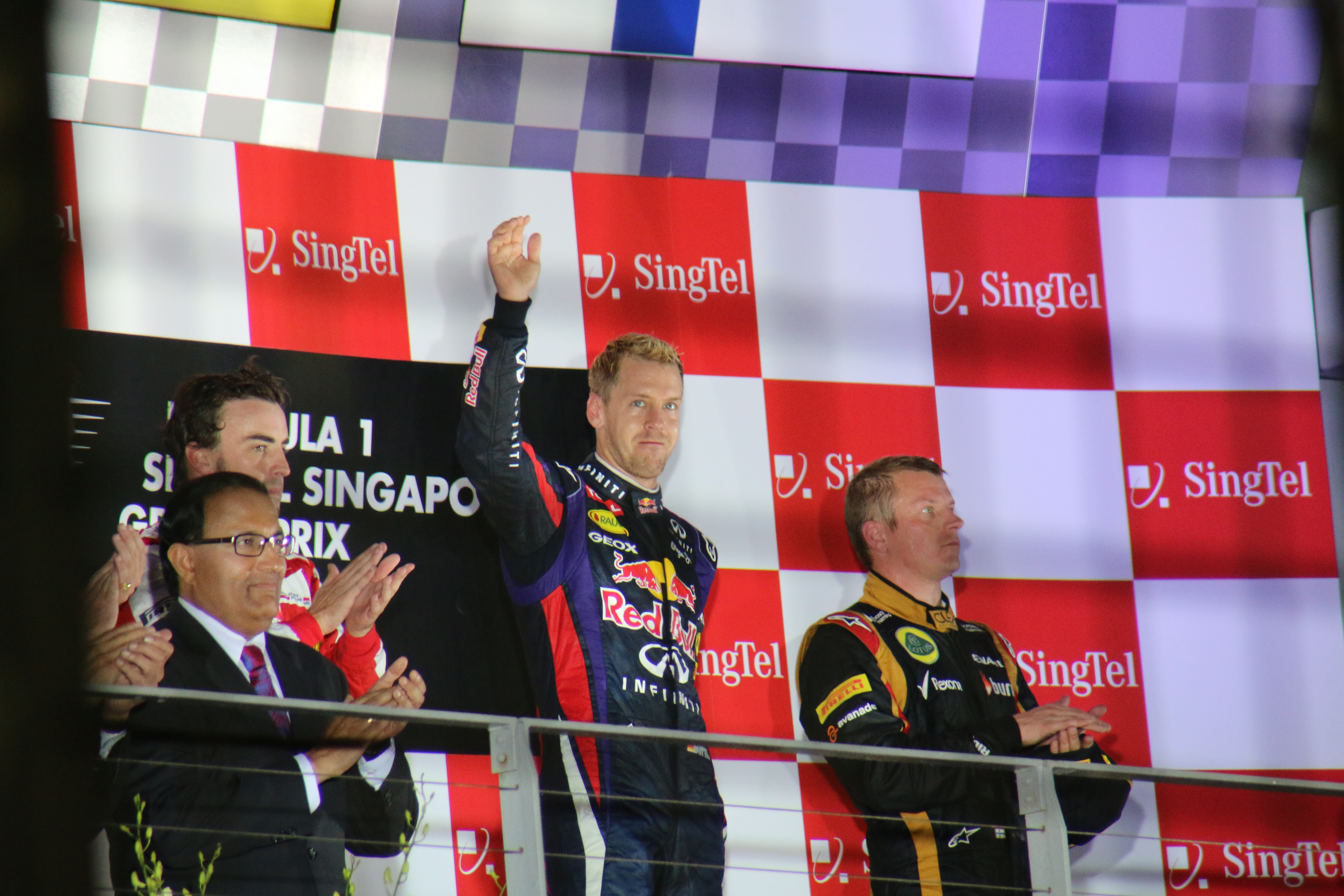
The podium finishers (left to right): Alonso, Vettel, and Räikkönen

A controversy developed after some spectators booed at Sebastian Vettel during the podium ceremony, prompting the TV interviewer Martin Brundle to break off and tell the jeering crowd to be quiet politely. The crowd's behaviour, which was not the first such incident directed at Vettel during the 2013 season, drew condemnation from Red Bull team principal Christian Horner, fellow driver Lewis Hamilton and former world champion Niki Lauda, among others.

== Classification ==
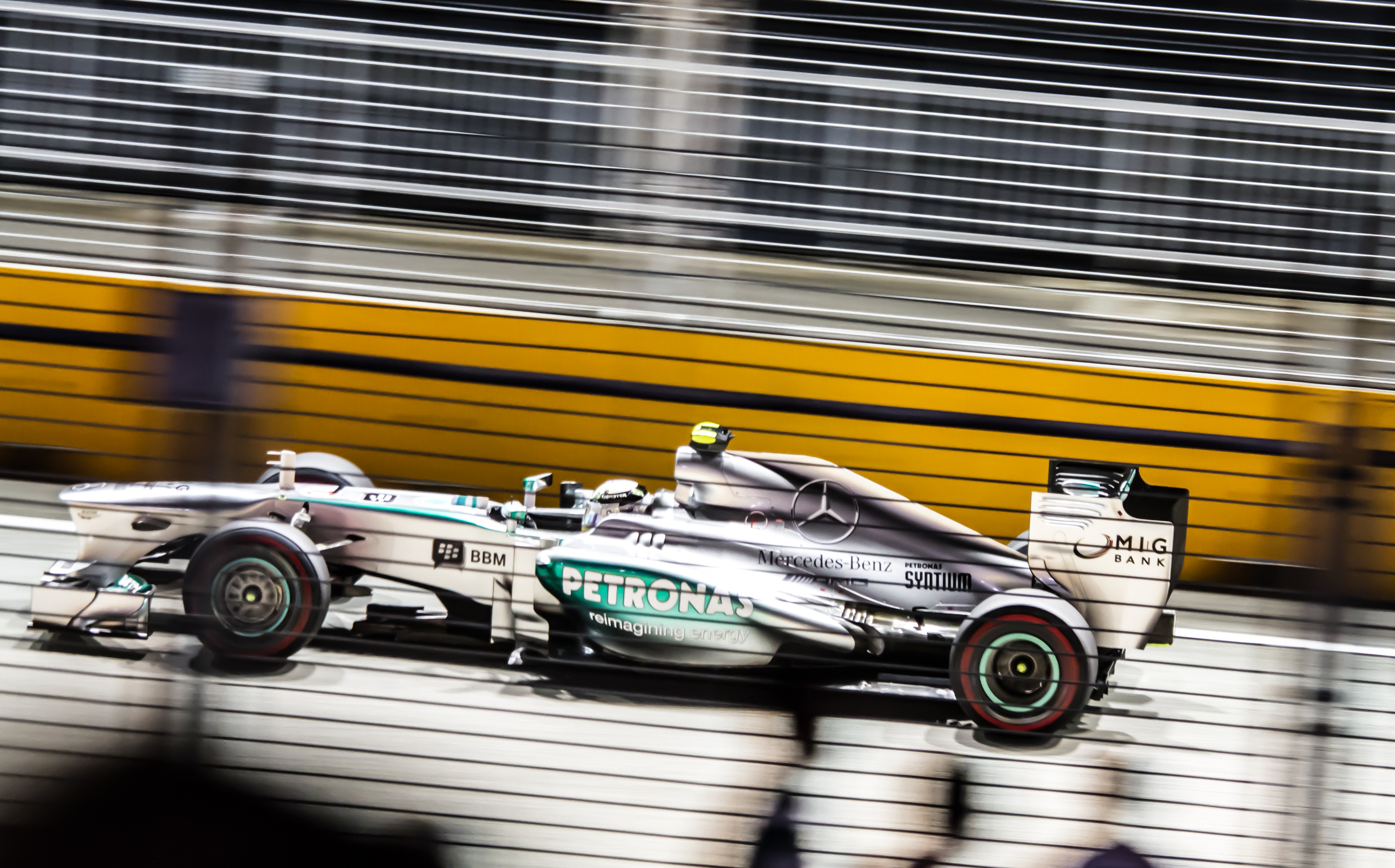
Mercedes team during qualifying

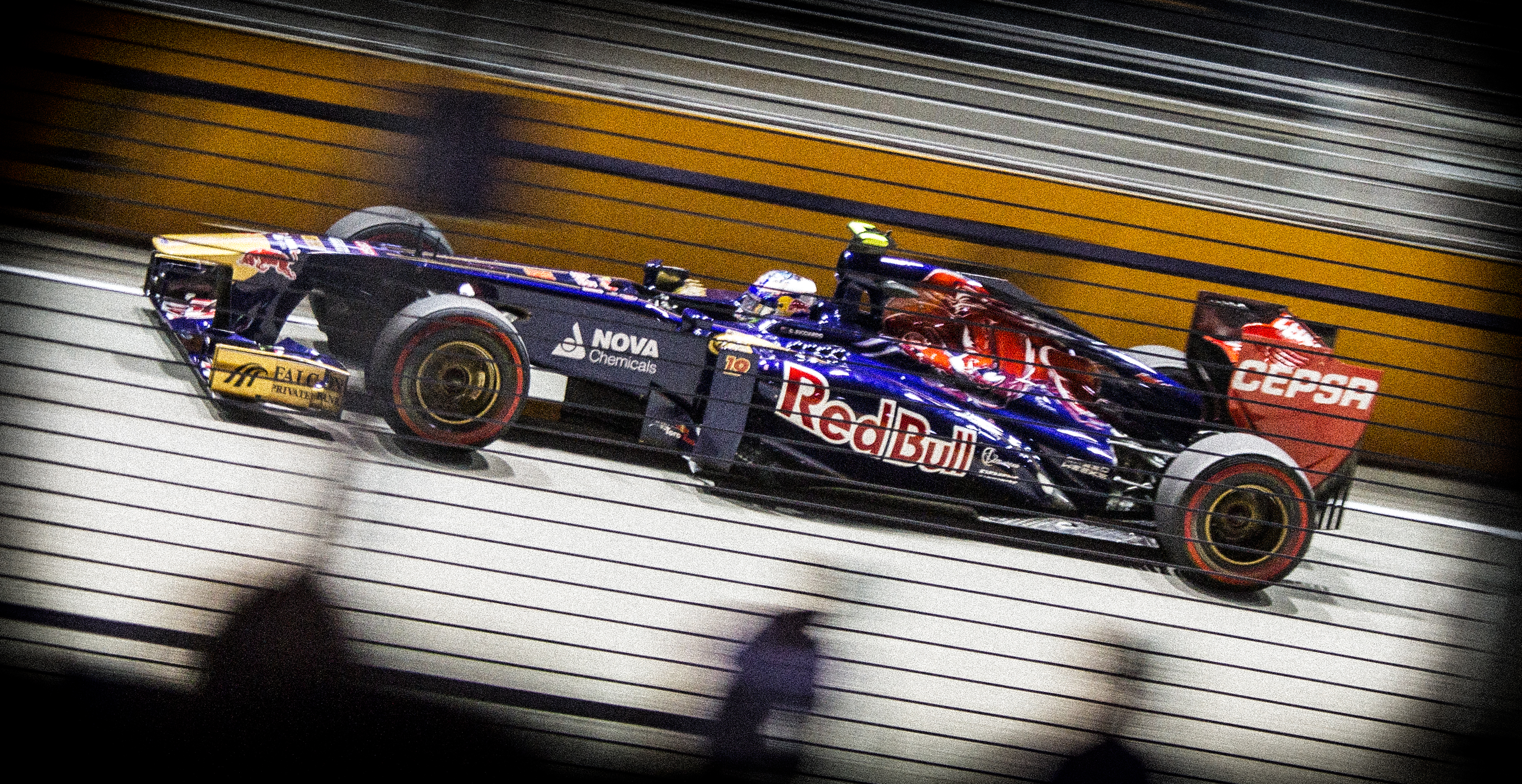
Toro Rosso during qualifying

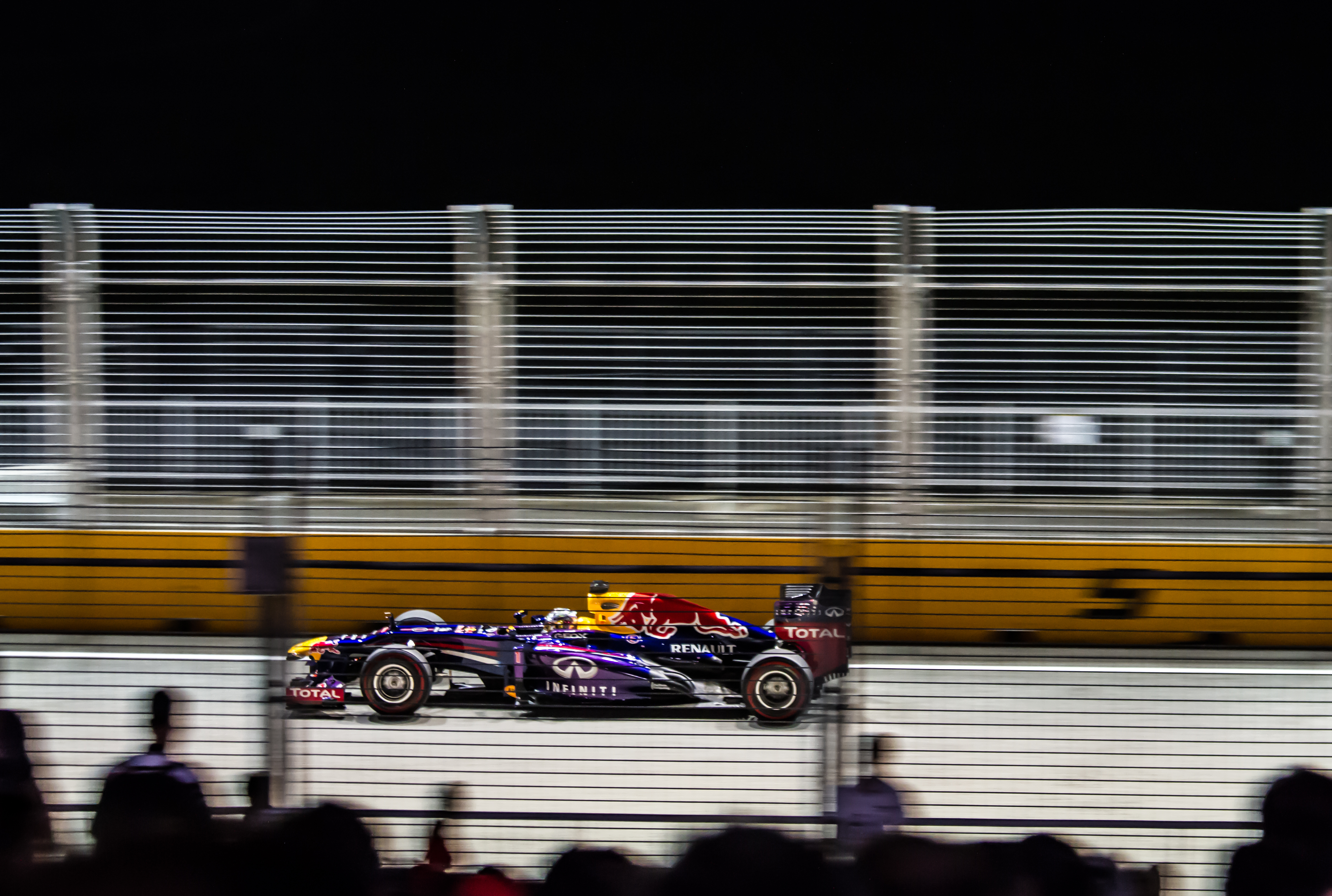
Sebastian Vettel was criticized after the race, but he was defended by Christian Horner among others.

=== Qualifying ===
Pos.	No.	Driver	Constructor	Q1	Q2	Q3	Grid
1	1	(Germany) Sebastian Vettel	Red Bull-Renault	1:45.376	1:42.905	1:42.841	1
2	9	(Germany) Nico Rosberg	Mercedes	1:45.208	1:43.892	1:42.932	2
3	8	(France) Romain Grosjean	Lotus-Renault	1:45.851	1:43.957	1:43.058	3
4	2	(Australia) Mark Webber	Red Bull-Renault	1:45.271	1:43.272	1:43.152	4
5	10	(United Kingdom) Lewis Hamilton	Mercedes	1:44.196	1:43.920	1:43.254	5
6	4	(Brazil) Felipe Massa	Ferrari	1:45.658	1:44.376	1:43.890	6
7	3	(Spain) Fernando Alonso	Ferrari	1:45.115	1:44.153	1:43.938	7
8	5	(United Kingdom) Jenson Button	McLaren-Mercedes	1:45.009	1:44.497	1:44.282	8
9	19	(Australia) Daniel Ricciardo	Toro Rosso-Ferrari	1:45.379	1:44.407	1:44.439	9
10	12	(Mexico) Esteban Gutiérrez	Sauber-Ferrari	1:45.483	1:44.245	no time	10
11	11	(Germany) Nico Hülkenberg	Sauber-Ferrari	1:45.381	1:44.555		11
12	18	(France) Jean-Éric Vergne	Toro Rosso-Ferrari	1:45.657	1:44.588		12
13	7	(Finland) Kimi Räikkönen	Lotus-Renault	1:45.522	1:44.658		13
14	6	(Mexico) Sergio Pérez	McLaren-Mercedes	1:45.164	1:44.752		14
15	15	(Germany) Adrian Sutil	Force India-Mercedes	1:45.960	1:45.185		15
16	17	(Finland) Valtteri Bottas	Williams-Renault	1:45.982	1:45.388		16
17	14	(United Kingdom) Paul di Resta	Force India-Mercedes	1:46.121			17
18	16	(Venezuela) Pastor Maldonado	Williams-Renault	1:46.619			18
19	20	(France) Charles Pic	Caterham-Renault	1:48.111			19
20	21	(Netherlands) Giedo van der Garde	Caterham-Renault	1:48.320			20
21	22	(France) Jules Bianchi	Marussia-Cosworth	1:48.830			21
22	23	(United Kingdom) Max Chilton	Marussia-Cosworth	1:48.930			22
107% time:1:51.489

=== Race ===
Pos.	No.	Driver	Constructor	Laps	Time/Retired	Grid	Points
1	1	(Germany) Sebastian Vettel	Red Bull-Renault	61	1:59:13.132	1	25
2	3	(Spain) Fernando Alonso	Ferrari	61	+32.627	7	18
3	7	(Finland) Kimi Räikkönen	Lotus-Renault	61	+43.920	13	15
4	9	(Germany) Nico Rosberg	Mercedes	61	+51.155	2	12
5	10	(United Kingdom) Lewis Hamilton	Mercedes	61	+53.159	5	10
6	4	(Brazil) Felipe Massa	Ferrari	61	+1:03.877	6	8
7	5	(United Kingdom) Jenson Button	McLaren-Mercedes	61	+1:23.354	8	6
8	6	(Mexico) Sergio Pérez	McLaren-Mercedes	61	+1:23.820	14	4
9	11	(Germany) Nico Hülkenberg	Sauber-Ferrari	61	+1:24.261	11	2
10	15	(Germany) Adrian Sutil	Force India-Mercedes	61	+1:24.688	15	1
11	16	(Venezuela) Pastor Maldonado	Williams-Renault	61	+1:28.479	18	
12	12	(Mexico) Esteban Gutiérrez	Sauber-Ferrari	61	+1:37.894	10	
13	17	(Finland) Valtteri Bottas	Williams-Renault	61	+1:45.161	16	
14	18	(France) Jean-Éric Vergne	Toro Rosso-Ferrari	61	+1:53.512	12	
15	2	(Australia) Mark Webber	Red Bull-Renault	60	Engine^{1}	4	
16	21	(Netherlands) Giedo van der Garde	Caterham-Renault	60	+1 Lap	20	
17	23	(United Kingdom) Max Chilton	Marussia-Cosworth	60	+1 Lap	22	
18	22	(France) Jules Bianchi	Marussia-Cosworth	60	+1 Lap	21	
19	20	(France) Charles Pic	Caterham-Renault	60	+1 Lap	19	
20	14	(United Kingdom) Paul di Resta	Force India-Mercedes	54	Accident^{1}	17	
Ret	8	(France) Romain Grosjean	Lotus-Renault	37	Pneumatics	3	
Ret	19	(Australia) Daniel Ricciardo	Toro Rosso-Ferrari	23	Accident	9	

Notes

- ^1 — Mark Webber and Paul di Resta failed to finish the race but were classified as they completed over 90% of the race.

== Championship standings after the race ==
Drivers' Championship standings

Pos.	Driver	Points
1	(Germany) Sebastian Vettel	247
2	(Spain) Fernando Alonso	187
3	(United Kingdom) Lewis Hamilton	151
4	(Finland) Kimi Räikkönen	149
5	(Australia) Mark Webber	130

Constructors' Championship standings

Pos.	Constructor	Points
1	(Austria) Red Bull-Renault	377
2	(Italy) Ferrari	274
3	(Germany) Mercedes	267
4	(United Kingdom) Lotus-Renault	206
5	(United Kingdom) McLaren-Mercedes	76

- Note: Only the top five positions are included for both sets of standings.

== See also ==
- 2013 Marina Bay GP2 Series round

Previous race: 2013 Italian Grand Prix	FIA Formula One World Championship; 2013 season	Next race: 2013 Korean Grand Prix
Previous race: 2012 Singapore Grand Prix	Singapore Grand Prix	Next race: 2014 Singapore Grand Prix
