= 2011 Indian Grand Prix =

Race 17 of 19 in the 2011 Formula One World Championship
← Previous race	Next race →

Race details
- Date: 30 October 2011
- Official name: 2011 Formula 1 Airtel Grand Prix of India
- Location: Buddh International Circuit; Greater Noida, Uttar Pradesh, India
- Course: Permanent racing facility
- Course length: 5.125 km (3.185 miles)
- Distance: 60 laps, 307.249 km (190.916 miles)
- Weather: Fine and Dry Air Temp 30 °C (86 °F)
- Attendance: 95,000 for weekend

Pole position
Driver	(Germany) Sebastian Vettel	Red Bull Racing-Renault
- Time: 1:24.178

Fastest lap
Driver	(Germany) Sebastian Vettel	Red Bull Racing-Renault
- Time: 1:27.249 on lap 60 (lap record)

Podium
First	(Germany) Sebastian Vettel	Red Bull Racing-Renault
Second	(United Kingdom) Jenson Button	McLaren-Mercedes
Third	(Spain) Fernando Alonso	Ferrari

The 2011 Indian Grand Prix, formally the 2011 Formula 1 Airtel Grand Prix of India, was a Formula One motor race that was held on 30 October 2011 at the Buddh International Circuit in Greater Noida, Uttar Pradesh, India. It was the seventeenth round of the 2011 Formula One season and the first Formula One Grand Prix to take place in South Asia and first to take place in India.

The 60-lap race was won by Red Bull Racing's Sebastian Vettel, after leading every lap of the race from pole position and setting the fastest lap of the race to claim his first Grand Slam. Jenson Button finished in second place for McLaren, and Fernando Alonso completed the podium for Ferrari, in third position.

== Report ==
=== Background ===
The circuit, designed by Hermann Tilke in association with teams, was deliberately designed to be one of the fastest on the calendar, with projected lap times of less than one minute and twenty seconds. The circuit was officially homologated on 1 September 2011. At 1060 metres, the circuit's main straight was among the longest in Formula One. The pit lane had also been described in similar terms at over 600 metres in length. Time spent in the pitlane was expected to be an important factor in determining race strategies. The race saw the return of two Drag Reduction System (DRS) zones and two detection points, as was the case at the Italian Grand Prix. The first zone encompassed the length of the pit straight, with the detection point on the exit to the penultimate corner; the second zone took in the second half of the long back straight, with its detection point located just before the apex of the third corner.

Indian driver Narain Karthikeyan returned to HRT for the race, having been replaced by Daniel Ricciardo since Silverstone. Ricciardo was moved to Vitantonio Liuzzi's car for the race, while Karthikeyan took Ricciardo's regular car, the car he started the season in. Fellow Indian driver Karun Chandhok had received support from Team Lotus team principal Tony Fernandes to take part in the race, though he conceded that the ultimate decision did not rest with him. On the Tuesday before the race, it was announced that Chandhok would not be racing in the Grand Prix, but would still run during Friday free practice.

Upon arrival at the circuit, teams reported several issues with construction, including power outages, some infrastructure being "incomplete", and a colony of bats living in the pit building. Faced with criticism over the morality of hosting a race in a developing nation, Mercedes GP team principal Ross Brawn praised the circuit, describing the decision to host a race in India as "the right one" and pointing out the benefits the sport would bring to the country. Brawn also relayed the positive response to the circuit layout from teams and drivers. Other personalities within the paddock were less complimentary, with commentator Martin Brundle describing the commentary booth as a "cell" with no window and "nowhere near [the] track", while team engineers reported that there was no gas connection available, the plumbing to the paddock was incomplete, and the entire circuit was still being powered by generators and did not have a continuous electricity supply.

Tyre supplier Pirelli brought its yellow-banded soft compound tyre as the "prime" tyre and the silver-banded hard compound as the "option" compound. This was the first and only race of the season where the prime tyre was the less durable than the option.

Like the Canadian, European, Italian races earlier in the year, two DRS (Drag Reduction System) Zones were implemented in the inaugural Indian race. The detection point for the first DRS zone was located at the exit of turn 15 (10m after), while the DRS activation point was 36m after the final turn (turn 16). This meant that the start/finish straight would be utilised for one DRS overtaking zone. The second DRS zone had the activation point 16m before the turn 3 hairpin while the DRS activation zone was 510m after turn 3 which is about halfway down the back straight prior to turn 4.

Vitaly Petrov was given a five-place grid penalty for causing an avoidable collision with Michael Schumacher at the Korean Grand Prix.

The race was Felipe Massa's 150th Grand Prix start.

=== Free Practice ===
The first Friday practice session was stopped after just five minutes when a stray dog found its way onto the circuit. The session was red-flagged while the dog was led away, and re-opened within five minutes.

When the session restarted, the two Force India cars, Karun Chandhok's Lotus and the Hispania of Narain Karthikeyan were queued at the end of pit lane, waiting to be the first cars to take to the circuit. Although most drivers prefer to do an "installation lap", pitting at the end of their first lap of the circuit, Chandhok remained out to set the first flying lap time of the circuit. Michael Schumacher and Jenson Button were the early leaders of the session, while Fernando Alonso's car succumbed to a loss of power halfway through the session. The track surface was noticeably dusty, and despite becoming cleaner as the session wore on, the drivers struggled for grip and several ran wide. Jaime Alguersuari fell victim to this lack of grip, spinning into the barriers at the far end of the circuit fifteen minutes before the chequered flag fell. Pastor Maldonado was also forced out when his Cosworth engine exploded. He had narrowly avoided a collision with Chandhok in pit lane moments before, after Chandhok spun when attempting to lay rubber down in the Lotus pit bay so as to allow the team's drivers a faster getaway from the concrete apron. When the session ended, Lewis Hamilton was fastest, half a second ahead of Sebastian Vettel and Mark Webber. Hamilton however, had set his time when yellow flags had been shown in the final sector for Pastor Maldonado's stricken Williams, and was given a three-place grid penalty. Sauber's Sergio Pérez received a three-place penalty for a similar offence.

The second session saw Felipe Massa top the timesheets, 0.088 seconds ahead of Vettel, and 0.224 seconds ahead of teammate Alonso, who had recovered from his mechanical fault in the first session. Several drivers ran off the road, with Turns 6 and 7 proving to be particularly troublesome as Vitaly Petrov, Kamui Kobayashi, Sébastien Buemi and Adrian Sutil all went off there. Pastor Maldonado experienced further trouble when he spun into the gravel at Turn 9, though his car could be retrieved in time for him to complete the session. The session was red-flagged with forty minutes remaining when Jérôme d'Ambrosio crashed at Turn 12; having run wide at Turn 11, he had gone too far onto the slippery kerbing on the inside of Turn 12 and spun when he applied too much power. Although the crash itself was heavy enough to destroy his rear wing and rear suspension, the damage was largely cosmetic. Jaime Alguersuari was suspected of ignoring yellow flags at Turn 9 and was referred to the race stewards, but escaped penalty when the team provided telemetry that demonstrated that he had slowed down.

The third and final practice session saw some of the fastest lap times of the weekend thus far; this was a by-product of dust being cleaned from the circuit and drivers becoming familiar with the circuit layout. Vettel finished fastest, becoming the first person to set a time faster than 1:25.00, and comfortably inside the projected lap times claimed by Pirelli. Button was second, ahead of Mark Webber and Lewis Hamilton. The new front wing of the Ferrari cars attracted significant attention, with commentators observing it to "flutter", rapidly vibrating and sparking off the circuit surface, particularly under braking into Turn 4. This phenomenon attracted the attention of the FIA's technical delegates, and the problem was noticed to have stopped when the team replaced the front wing on Felipe Massa's car.

=== Qualifying ===
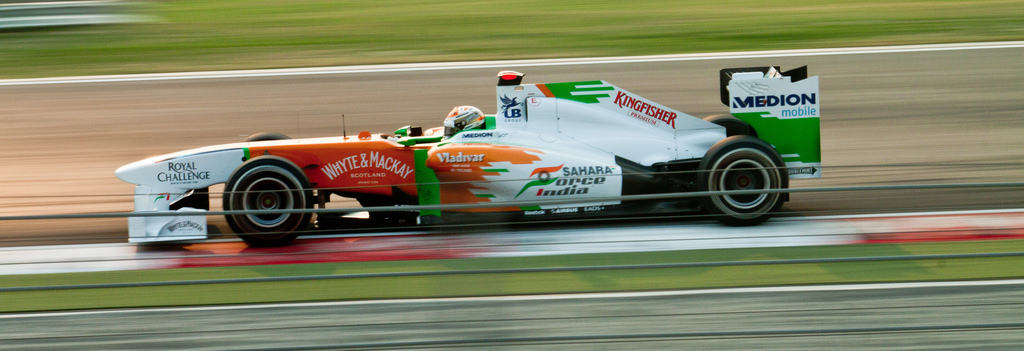
Adrian Sutil qualified in eighth position for Force India's 'home race'.

Qualifying began with the observation that many of the drivers using the softer option tyres drove a slower flying lap to generate heat into the tyres, before starting a faster flying lap. Vitaly Petrov set the fastest time of the session, while Timo Glock was forced out early with a gearbox problem. Glock failed to set a time within 107% of Petrov, and therefore needed permission to enter the race. Permission was ultimately granted on the basis that Glock had set times through free practice that were well within 107% of the fastest times in those sessions. Jenson Button experienced early troubles when he reported that his car lacked rear grip, and he was sixteenth in the final few minutes of the session, just ahead of Michael Schumacher in seventeenth and Kamui Kobayashi in eighteenth. Both of them had demonstrated lap times faster than that of Button's, placing Button in danger of being eliminated. Button was forced to use a set of option tyres earlier than planned in order to advance to Q2, even though Kobayashi ultimately aborted his final flying lap, meaning Button would have been safe whether he had stayed in the pits or not. Michael Schumacher was impeded on his final lap through Turns 10 and 11 by Narain Karthikeyan, who later received a five-place penalty for the infringement. Kobayashi, Heikki Kovalainen, Jarno Trulli, Daniel Ricciardo, Karthikeyan, Jérôme d'Ambrosio and Timo Glock were all eliminated, although those positions were subject to change once grid penalties were applied.

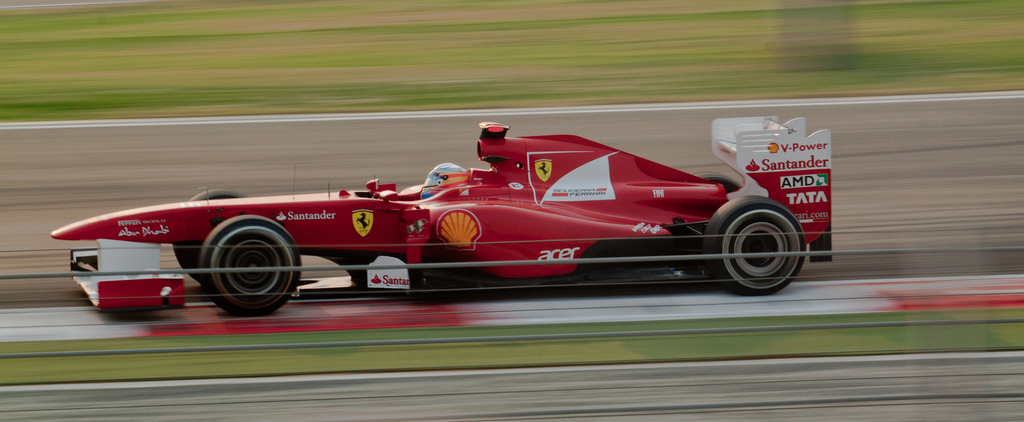
Fernando Alonso qualified in third position.

The second qualifying period was topped by Sebastian Vettel, who remained the only driver of the weekend to break the 1:25.000 barrier. Jaime Alguersuari and Vitaly Petrov set identical lap times to the thousandth of a second, with both drivers recording a lap time of 1:26.319, and finishing the session in tenth and eleventh place respectively. Alguersuari advanced to the third and final qualifying period by virtue of having set his lap time before Petrov. Petrov finished the session eleventh, which became sixteenth when his penalty from the Korean Grand Prix was applied. Michael Schumacher qualified twelfth after complaining of a vibration in the rear of the car, ahead of Paul di Resta, Pastor Maldonado, Bruno Senna, Rubens Barrichello, Petrov and Sergio Pérez in seventeenth. Pérez was later moved back to twentieth place, having earned a three-place penalty for ignoring yellow flags in practice, and started the race behind teammate Kobayashi and the Team Lotus cars of Kovalainen and Trulli.

The third and final session saw the top four drivers separated by just one tenth of a second. Vettel set the early pace, ahead of Hamilton, Mark Webber and Fernando Alonso. Having used a set of soft tyres early, Jenson Button elected to do just one flying lap at the end of the session, finishing fifth after Felipe Massa crashed out in front of him and forcing Button to slow down. Massa hit the high kerb on the inside of Turn 8, breaking his suspension and sending him into the wall, damaging his front wing. There was some contention as to whether Button's lap time was legal, as he had set his fastest (and only) lap time while yellow flags were displayed for Massa's crash. Button maintained that he had slowed down as soon as he saw the accident, but that he was following too closely to Massa at the time of the accident to have seen the yellow flags; by the time the marshalls had reacted, Button had already passed the marshall station. The stewards took no action against him. Massa's accident also disrupted the final laps of Webber, Hamilton and Alonso, giving Sebastian Vettel his thirteenth pole position of the season. Hamilton finished second, which became fifth once his penalty was applied. Webber qualified third ahead of Alonso and Button, with Massa sixth and Nico Rosberg seventh, the final driver to have set a lap time. Adrian Sutil would start the race in eighth place, having taken to the circuit to record sector times, but without actually completing a lap. Sébastien Buemi and Jaime Alguersuari were ninth and tenth, making the race the first time all four cars owned by Red Bull had started in the top ten.

After grid penalties had been applied, just seven drivers – Vettel, Massa, Rosberg, Sutil, Buemi, Alguersuari and Glock – started the race in the positioned they had actually qualified in.

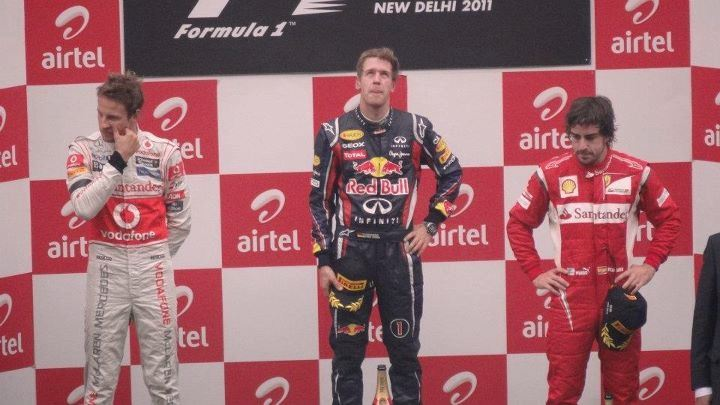
From left to right: Jenson Button, Sebastian Vettel and Fernando Alonso on the podium

=== Race ===
Before the race, a minute's silence was held in memory of IndyCar driver Dan Wheldon and MotoGP rider Marco Simoncelli, who died in motor racing accidents over the previous two weekends. Sebastian Vettel retained the lead from the start, while Jenson Button also had a good start, jumping Fernando Alonso down into turn 1. He then managed to pass Mark Webber on the back straight to be second by the end of the first lap. By comparison, his McLaren teammate Lewis Hamilton dropped down behind Felipe Massa to sixth at the start. Michael Schumacher was another to make a good start, jumping up to eighth, just behind Mercedes teammate Nico Rosberg, having started eleventh. Bruno Senna, having started fourteenth, now rounded out the points-scoring positions in 10th place, behind Adrian Sutil.

Meanwhile, behind the leading pack, carnage ensued. Rubens Barrichello made slight contact with his Williams teammate Pastor Maldonado. The Brazilian then speared sidewards and collected Kamui Kobayashi. As the Sauber driver returned to the track, he hit Timo Glock. Maldonado's car was undamaged, and he continued, while Barrichello pitted for a new front wing and also continued. Kobayashi, meanwhile, pulled off on the back straight, and Glock retired his Virgin two laps later with suspension damage. There was also contact at turn 3, as Narain Karthikeyan hit the back of Jarno Trulli's Lotus, spinning the Italian off the track. Trulli pitted for repairs and continued, but he was slow for the rest of the race.

On lap 9, Jaime Alguersuari successfully completed an overtaking manoeuvre on Senna, with the aid of the DRS, to move into tenth place. The Renault driver was passed just a couple of laps later by Alguersuari's Toro Rosso teammate Sébastien Buemi. Pastor Maldonado suffered a gearbox failure on lap 13 and became the race's third retirement. However, he parked the Williams far enough off the race track to avoid a safety car. The following lap, Alguersuari continued his charge up the field, passing Adrian Sutil's Force India to take ninth place.

The pitstops began for the top ten on lap 17, as Webber, Alonso, Hamilton and Alguersuari all pitted. Alonso emerged behind Michael Schumacher, but was able to quickly pass the Mercedes driver. The following lap, Massa and Rosberg both pitted to restore the positions up front. After the leaders, Vettel and Button, also pitted, the order from before the pitstops was exactly restored, with the exception of Bruno Senna, who was now in tenth having not yet pitted. When he did, Sebastien Buemi had managed to jump in front of Sutil in the pit stops.

Shortly afterwards, the race's major talking point occurred when Lewis Hamilton attempted to pass Felipe Massa in turn five. As had happened already four times before in the 2011 season – in Monaco, Silverstone, Singapore and Suzuka – the two cars collided. Massa continued without damage but was later awarded a drive through penalty for the incident. Hamilton, meanwhile, was forced to return to the pits to change his front wing. On the same lap, Sébastien Buemi retired his Toro Rosso with an engine failure, maintaining the relatively high level of attrition in the race. At the end of that lap, then, Massa remained in fifth place, but Rosberg, Schumacher and Alguersuari were promoted to sixth, seventh and eighth places respectively. Hamilton was now ninth after his adventures, with Sutil promoted to tenth by Buemi's retirement.

When Massa took his drive through penalty, he dropped down behind the two Mercedes cars. Meanwhile, Hamilton passed Alguersuari for eighth, leaving the McLaren and the Ferrari nose to tail once again. However, it was only one lap before Massa suffered a suspension failure, just as he had suffered in qualifying, as he this time broke the left front suspension of his Ferrari on the kerb and retired from the race. This left, on lap 32, Hamilton in seventh, Alguersuari back to eighth and Sutil and Sergio Pérez, who had been having a quiet race for Sauber, rounding out the points. The second round of pitstops saw far less action than the first, with the exception of Alonso's better stop allowing him to emerge ahead of Mark Webber's Red Bull Racing in the battle for third place. Also, Bruno Senna was now in ninth, due to being on a different pit stop strategy. Senna pitted four laps from the end, allowing Sutil and Pérez back into their ninth and tenth place.

The race finished, therefore, with Vettel comfortably ahead of Button and Alonso holding off a charge from Webber to round out the podium. Michael Schumacher led home teammate Nico Rosberg for a strong fifth place, while Hamilton was the last unlapped runner in seventh. Alguersuari's eighth place allowed Toro Rosso to draw level with Sauber in the chase for seventh in the constructors' championship, with Sutil leading Pérez home in the last two points scoring positions. Vettel completed his first career Grand Slam with the race's fastest lap on the final lap, having led every lap from pole position prior to doing so but at the time no one knew this would be Vettel's last win of 2011.

== Controversies ==
=== Taxation dispute ===
Six weeks before the Grand Prix, reports emerged that the race was under threat from the Indian government seeking to tax a share of the teams' earnings. Under the system used by Formula One, teams that place in the top ten in the final World Constructors' Championship standings receive a percentage of money paid to Formula One Management for television rights. In accordance with Indian tax law, it was reported that the Indian government believed it was entitled to levy taxes on these earnings because the teams competed in India. This led to suggestions that the teams could boycott the race, though McLaren team principal and Formula One Teams Association chairman Martin Whitmarsh denied the claims, stating that the teams were exploring their options and were confident of finding a resolution. On 14 September, the race organizers JPSI offered to pay the customs tax if necessary. The Indian government later relented, offering the sport an exemption from paying the tax altogether. The Supreme Court sought an explanation from the Uttar Pradesh government for granting the tax exemption to Jaypee Group. The notices were issued by the apex court on the basis of a public interest litigation, which challenged the exemption of entertainment and luxury tax for organising the Formula One event. On 21 October, the Supreme Court enacted a temporary injunction to end the dispute, stipulating that the event organisers would deposit 25% of ticket money into a separate account until the court judged the validity of the entertainment tax exemption granted for the event by the Uttar Pradesh government.

=== Status of visa applications ===
Further complications arose when several figures within the Formula One paddock – reported to be Mercedes driver Nico Rosberg and "half" of the HRT team – had their visa applications rejected. A senior FIA figure was quoted as saying that if the extended visa processing period continued, then up to ninety percent of people involved in the sport would be unable to attend the race. Ten days before the race, Team Lotus driver Heikki Kovalainen reported via Twitter that he was still in the process of signing documents to enter the country, labelling the process as "a joke" and describing it as needlessly complex. Despite concerns over the application process, no teams reported that their personnel had been denied entry to the country.

== Classification ==
=== Qualifying ===
Pos	No	Driver	Constructor	Part 1	Part 2	Part 3	Grid
1	1	(Germany) Sebastian Vettel	Red Bull Racing-Renault	1:26.218	1:24.657	1:24.178	1
2	3	(United Kingdom) Lewis Hamilton	McLaren-Mercedes	1:26.563	1:25.019	1:24.474	5^{1}
3	2	(Australia) Mark Webber	Red Bull Racing-Renault	1:26.473	1:25.282	1:24.508	2
4	5	(Spain) Fernando Alonso	Ferrari	1:26.774	1:25.158	1:24.519	3
5	4	(United Kingdom) Jenson Button	McLaren-Mercedes	1:26.225	1:25.299	1:24.950	4
6	6	(Brazil) Felipe Massa	Ferrari	1:27.012	1:25.522	1:25.122	6
7	8	(Germany) Nico Rosberg	Mercedes	1:26.364	1:25.555	1:25.451	7
8	14	(Germany) Adrian Sutil	Force India-Mercedes	1:26.271	1:26.140	no time	8
9	18	(Switzerland) Sébastien Buemi	Toro Rosso-Ferrari	1:26.608	1:26.161	no time	9
10	19	(Spain) Jaime Alguersuari	Toro Rosso-Ferrari	1:26.557	1:26.319	no time	10
11	10	(Russia) Vitaly Petrov	Renault	1:26.189	1:26.319		16^{2}
12	7	(Germany) Michael Schumacher	Mercedes	1:26.790	1:26.337		11
13	15	(United Kingdom) Paul di Resta	Force India-Mercedes	1:26.864	1:26.503		12
14	12	(Venezuela) Pastor Maldonado	Williams-Cosworth	1:26.829	1:26.537		13
15	9	(Brazil) Bruno Senna	Renault	1:26.766	1:26.651		14
16	11	(Brazil) Rubens Barrichello	Williams-Cosworth	1:27.479	1:27.247		15
17	17	(Mexico) Sergio Pérez	Sauber-Ferrari	1:27.249	1:27.562		20^{1}
18	16	(Japan) Kamui Kobayashi	Sauber-Ferrari	1:27.876			17
19	20	(Finland) Heikki Kovalainen	Lotus-Renault	1:28.565			18
20	21	(Italy) Jarno Trulli	Lotus-Renault	1:28.752			19
21	23	(Australia) Daniel Ricciardo	HRT-Cosworth	1:30.216			23^{3}
22	22	(India) Narain Karthikeyan	HRT-Cosworth	1:30.238			24^{4}
23	25	(Belgium) Jérôme d'Ambrosio	Virgin-Cosworth	1:30.866			21
107% time: 1:32.222
24	24	(Germany) Timo Glock	Virgin-Cosworth	1:34.046			22

Notes
^1 – Lewis Hamilton and Sergio Pérez were given three-place grid penalties for ignoring yellow flags during the first practice session.
^2 – Vitaly Petrov was given a five-place grid penalty for causing an accident with Michael Schumacher at the Korean Grand Prix. Although Petrov and Jaime Alguersuari set identical lap times in Q2, Alguersuari advanced to Q3 because he had set his lap time three minutes before Petrov.
^3 – Daniel Ricciardo was given a five-place grid penalty for a gearbox change.
^4 – Narain Karthikeyan was given a five-place grid penalty for impeding Michael Schumacher during Q1.

=== Race ===
Pos	No	Driver	Constructor	Laps	Time/Retired	Grid	Points
1	1	(Germany) Sebastian Vettel	Red Bull Racing-Renault	60	1:30:35.002	1	25
2	4	(United Kingdom) Jenson Button	McLaren-Mercedes	60	+8.433	4	18
3	5	(Spain) Fernando Alonso	Ferrari	60	+24.301	3	15
4	2	(Australia) Mark Webber	Red Bull Racing-Renault	60	+25.529	2	12
5	7	(Germany) Michael Schumacher	Mercedes	60	+1:05.421	11	10
6	8	(Germany) Nico Rosberg	Mercedes	60	+1:06.851	7	8
7	3	(United Kingdom) Lewis Hamilton	McLaren-Mercedes	60	+1:24.183	5	6
8	19	(Spain) Jaime Alguersuari	Toro Rosso-Ferrari	59	+1 Lap	10	4
9	14	(Germany) Adrian Sutil	Force India-Mercedes	59	+1 Lap	8	2
10	17	(Mexico) Sergio Pérez	Sauber-Ferrari	59	+1 Lap	20	1
11	10	(Russia) Vitaly Petrov	Renault	59	+1 Lap	16	
12	9	(Brazil) Bruno Senna	Renault	59	+1 Lap	14	
13	15	(United Kingdom) Paul di Resta	Force India-Mercedes	59	+1 Lap	12	
14	20	(Finland) Heikki Kovalainen	Lotus-Renault	58	+2 Laps	18	
15	11	(Brazil) Rubens Barrichello	Williams-Cosworth	58	+2 Laps	15	
16	25	(Belgium) Jérôme d'Ambrosio	Virgin-Cosworth	57	+3 Laps	21	
17	22	(India) Narain Karthikeyan	HRT-Cosworth	57	+3 Laps	24	
18	23	(Australia) Daniel Ricciardo	HRT-Cosworth	57	+3 Laps	23	
19	21	(Italy) Jarno Trulli	Lotus-Renault	55	+5 Laps	19	
Ret	6	(Brazil) Felipe Massa	Ferrari	32	Suspension	6	
Ret	18	(Switzerland) Sébastien Buemi	Toro Rosso-Ferrari	24	Engine	9	
Ret	12	(Venezuela) Pastor Maldonado	Williams-Cosworth	12	Gearbox	13	
Ret	24	(Germany) Timo Glock	Virgin-Cosworth	2	Collision damage	22	
Ret	16	(Japan) Kamui Kobayashi	Sauber-Ferrari	0	Collision	17	

== Championship standings after the race ==
Drivers' Championship standings

Pos.	Driver	Points
1	(Germany) **Sebastian Vettel**	374
2	(United Kingdom) Jenson Button	240
3	(Spain) Fernando Alonso	227
4	(Australia) Mark Webber	221
5	(United Kingdom) Lewis Hamilton	202

Constructors' Championship standings

Pos.	Constructor	Points
1	(Austria) **Red Bull Racing-Renault**	595
2	(United Kingdom) McLaren-Mercedes	442
3	(Italy) Ferrari	325
4	(Germany) Mercedes	145
5	(United Kingdom) Renault	72

- Note: Only the top five positions are included for both sets of standings.
- **Bold text** indicates the 2011 World Champions.

Previous race: 2011 Korean Grand Prix	FIA Formula One World Championship; 2011 season	Next race: 2011 Abu Dhabi Grand Prix
Previous race: N/A	Indian Grand Prix	Next race: 2012 Indian Grand Prix
Awards
Preceded by 2010 Korean Grand Prix	Formula One Promotional Trophy for Race Promoter; 2011	Succeeded by 2012 Indian Grand Prix
