= Yeongam-eup =

Place in South Korea

- Panoramic view of Yeongam-eup

Korean name
- Hangul: 영암읍
- Hanja: 靈巖邑
- RR: Yeongam-eup
- MR: Yŏngam-ŭp

Yeongam-eup (Korean: 영암읍) is the county seat of Yeongam County, South Jeolla province, South Korea. It was elevated from myeon to eup in 1979.

There is a population of 10,724 from 3,697 households.
