= Korean Grand Prix =

Formula One Grand Prix

- Korea International Circuit

Race information
- Number of times held: 4
- First held: 2010
- Last held: 2013
- Most wins (drivers): (Germany) Sebastian Vettel (3)
- Most wins (constructors): (Austria) Red Bull Racing (3)
- Circuit length: 5.615 km (3.48 miles)
- Race length: 308.825 km (191.4 miles)
- Laps: 55

Last race (2013)

Pole position
- (Germany) Sebastian Vettel; Red Bull-Renault; 1:37.202

Podium
- 1. (Germany) Sebastian Vettel; Red Bull-Renault; 1:43:13.701; 2. (Finland) Kimi Räikkönen; Lotus-Renault; +4.224; 3. (France) Romain Grosjean; Lotus-Renault; +4.927

Fastest lap
- (Germany) Sebastian Vettel; Red Bull-Renault; 1:41.380

The Korean Grand Prix (Korean: 코리아 그랑프리) was a Formula One race held in South Korea, from 2010 until 2013, when it was dropped from the Formula One calendar.

== History ==
On 2 October 2006, it was confirmed that the event would take place in 2010, and would be hosted by the Korea International Circuit, in Yeongam. It was also revealed that the race would be promoted by a public-private company. The deal was for seven years with a five-year option that would allow the race to be held until 2021.

Despite this confirmation, the Korean Grand Prix was not included on any of the provisional 2010 calendars released by Formula One Management. Following approval of funding for the event, Korea was given the date of 17 October on the 2010 calendar published by the Fédération Internationale de l'Automobile (FIA) on 21 September 2009. On 10 December 2009, the organisers of the event announced that they were on schedule, with a plan to finish the circuit on 5 July 2010, though they admitted that their largest problem lay in finding accommodation for all Formula One staff and spectators. The organisers also ruled out the possibility of staging the race at night until they have more knowledge of and experience in running a Grand Prix. Despite all the confirmation, there was still a risk that the circuit might not be on time, however this was denied by the race promoter who said that the circuit was ahead of schedule.

After several postponements, the FIA scheduled a final inspection of the circuit on 11 October 2010, 13 days before the Korean Grand Prix was scheduled to begin. After the FIA inspection, Race Director Charlie Whiting declared that the race would go ahead.

In 2011, organisers of the Korean Grand Prix expressed dissatisfaction over the terms of their contract with Bernie Ecclestone and Formula One Management, particularly with regard to the cost of race-sanctioning fees, and sought to renegotiate the contract, seeking more-favourable terms. However, Ecclestone ruled out renegotiations, stating that the initial negotiation process had been difficult enough, and that the organisers were aware of the terms of the contract when they first signed it. Ecclestone has stated that in the event that race organisers could not pay sanctioning fees, the Korean Grand Prix would be removed from the calendar. The final calendar, released in December 2011, kept the Korean Grand Prix. After the 2012 Australian Grand Prix, organisers of the race in Korea announced that they had reached a new deal with Formula One Management that would save $20.5 million (₩23 billion) in costs. Kang Hyo-seok, director of race organisation for the Korean Grand Prix, admitted that the race was still "too expensive" for Korea, anticipating an estimated loss of $26 million (₩29 billion) in 2012. The race went ahead in 2013.

=== Cancellation ===
A preliminary calendar for the 2014 season listed a provisional date for the Korean Grand Prix, but the race was omitted from the final calendar for 2014.

Initially, the race was not included in the provisional 2015 calendar, a later calendar released in December 2014, gave the Korean Grand Prix a slot on 3 May 2015, having been moved from towards the end of the calendar in previous years, towards the start of the calendar. On 12 December 2014, Bernie Ecclestone said that Korean Grand Prix had to be added to 2015 calendar for legal reasons, citing contract obligations, but that organizers were not keen on having the race. Later, it was announced that it had been removed from the calendar by the FIA because the organisers did not wish to host it. They had plans to revive the Korean Grand Prix in 2016, but these also failed to materialise.

== Winners ==
All Korean Grands Prix were held at Yeongam.

Year	Driver	Constructor	Report
2010	(Spain) Fernando Alonso	Ferrari	Report
2011	(Germany) Sebastian Vettel	Red Bull Racing-Renault	Report
2012	(Germany) Sebastian Vettel	Red Bull Racing-Renault	Report
2013	(Germany) Sebastian Vettel	Red Bull Racing-Renault	Report

== See also ==
- Korea Super Prix, Formula Three race held annually in Korea between 1999 and 2003
