= Korea International Circuit =

Motorsport race track in Yeongam, South Korea

- Grand Prix Circuit (2010–present)
- Location: Yeongam, South Jeolla Province, South Korea
- Coordinates: 34°44′N 126°25′E
- Capacity: 135,000
- FIA Grade: 2 (3 layouts)
- Broke ground: 2 September 2009; 17 years ago
- Opened: 11 October 2010; 16 years ago
- Construction cost: 88 billion won
- Major events: Current: Superrace Championship (2010–present); Former: Formula One; Korean Grand Prix (2010–2013); Porsche Carrera Cup Asia (2015, 2023); GT World Challenge Asia (2019); TCR Asia Series (2016, 2018)
- Website: http://www.koreacircuit.kr

Grand Prix Circuit (2010–present)
- Length: 5.615 km (3.489 mi)
- Turns: 18
- Race lap record: 1:39.605 ( (Germany) Sebastian Vettel, Red Bull RB7, 2011, F1)

National Circuit (2010–present)
- Length: 3.045 km (1.892 mi)
- Turns: 11
- Race lap record: 1:20.191 ( (Germany) Peter Terting, Hyundai i30 N TCR, 2018, TCR)

Short Grand Prix Circuit (2019–present)
- Length: 3.312 km (2.058 mi)
- Turns: 13

The Korea International Circuit (코리아 인터내셔널 서킷) is a 5.615 km (3.489 mi) motorsport circuit located in Yeongam, South Jeolla Province, South Korea, 320 km (200 mi) south of Seoul and near the port city of Mokpo. It was the venue for the Korean Grand Prix from 2010 to 2013 after a $264 million (250 billion won) deal between Bernie Ecclestone and the Korean F1 promoter Korea Auto Valley Operation (KAVO – a joint venture between M-Bridge Holdings and Jeollanam-do regional government).

By 2015, having only hosted four Grand Prix events and relegated to hosting modestly attended local races, the facility had been criticized as a debacle.

== History ==
It was announced on 2 September 2009, that the funding was in place to start construction at the site, and officials were confident the work would be completed in time to hold a Grand Prix in 2010. On 10 December 2009, the organisers of the event announced that they were on schedule, with a plan to finish the circuit on 5 July 2010, though they admitted that their largest problem lay in finding accommodation for all Formula One staff and spectators.

German designer Hermann Tilke was responsible for designing the circuit. It is part permanent, part temporary. The temporary part is along the harbour side of the province where spectators from the promenade, hotels and yachts can view the race. Parts of the city with possible exhibition facilities, shops, restaurants and cafes are utilized as the pit lane during the F1 Grand Prix weekend.

The initial contract has a duration of seven years, with a five-year option that could take the race until 2021. The circuit planned to revive the Korea Super Prix in 2011, the Formula Three event, previously held at the Changwon City Raceway, last raced in 2003.

In the midst of speculation that the race would be aborted because the circuit would not be completed in time, organisers for the race announced the circuit's opening date to be 5 September 2010. On 4 September 2010, in an event called ‘Circuit Run 2010’, a Red Bull Racing Formula 1 show car using a V10 version of the current Renault engine, with Karun Chandhok at the wheel, completed 14 laps of the all-new Korean Formula One Grand Prix circuit. Four thousand spectators travelled to the new track for the event.

The final track inspection was delayed multiple times. Originally, the FIA technical delegates were due to inspect the circuit on 28 September 2010 in order to grant permission for F1 races to be held there, however the date was later moved to 11 October, only 11 days before the first cars were scheduled to take part in the first practice session. Following a two-day track inspection, FIA race director Charlie Whiting described the Yeongam circuit as ‘satisfactory’ and announced the mandatory license would be issued through the Korea Automobile Racing Association (KARA).

The inaugural Korean Grand Prix was run on 24 October for the 2010 Formula One season. The event was the 17th out of 19 events during the season, after the Japanese Grand Prix at the Suzuka Circuit. The capacity of the venue is 135,000 spectators.

According to the Chonnam Yeongam Korean Formula One Grand Prix circuit, around 77 million dollars (88 billion won) was needed for the construction cost of the circuit, the amount requested by the scholarship that was used in the 52.8 billion won. However, it was difficult to secure the remaining 35.2 billion won, and it was reported that there would be virtually no prospect of government aid to the Formula 1 project by the Korean government.

The Korean circuit was included in the 2012 FIA GT1 World Championship calendar, but later it was removed. It was announced in 2012 that the circuit would host an exhibition round of the 2013 Super GT season; the plans also fell through.

== A lap in a Formula One car ==
The circuit starts with a double left hander; the first corner is taken in second gear, with the drivers accelerating through the second turn. This opens up onto a straight 1.160 km (0.721 mi) long, which in turn feeds into the slowest corner on the circuit, a second-gear right-hand bend. The cars follow a shorter straight, home to the support pits, before a series of tight switchbacks at turns four, five and six; all three are taken in second gear. The circuit then opens up again, flowing through a series of fast fifth-gear bends, before the driver must brake for turn ten, a tight right-hander whose approach is made more difficult by the position of the braking zone on a downward-sloping incline. The remainder of the circuit is modelled on a street circuit, and follows a labyrinth series of left and right-hand bends that lead to turn seventeen, a long right-hander that is completely blind as it is surrounded by walls. The final turn on the circuit is a left-hand kink that feeds onto the main straight.

=== Pit entry and exit ===
The pit lane has been controversial due to its entry and exit. In 2010 the pit lane entry was deemed dangerous by drivers such as Robert Kubica because it is on the racing line on the exit of a 240 km/h (150 mph) corner, so cars pitting will be going significantly slower but still on the racing line. Kubica stated "it might be quite tight" and Jarno Trulli said that he was "worried about someone going into the back of him" when he was forced to pit in because he was stuck in gear. The wall at Turn 17 was moved back in 2011 to improve visibility at that part of the track, so drivers on a hot lap can see drivers slowing to go into the pits.

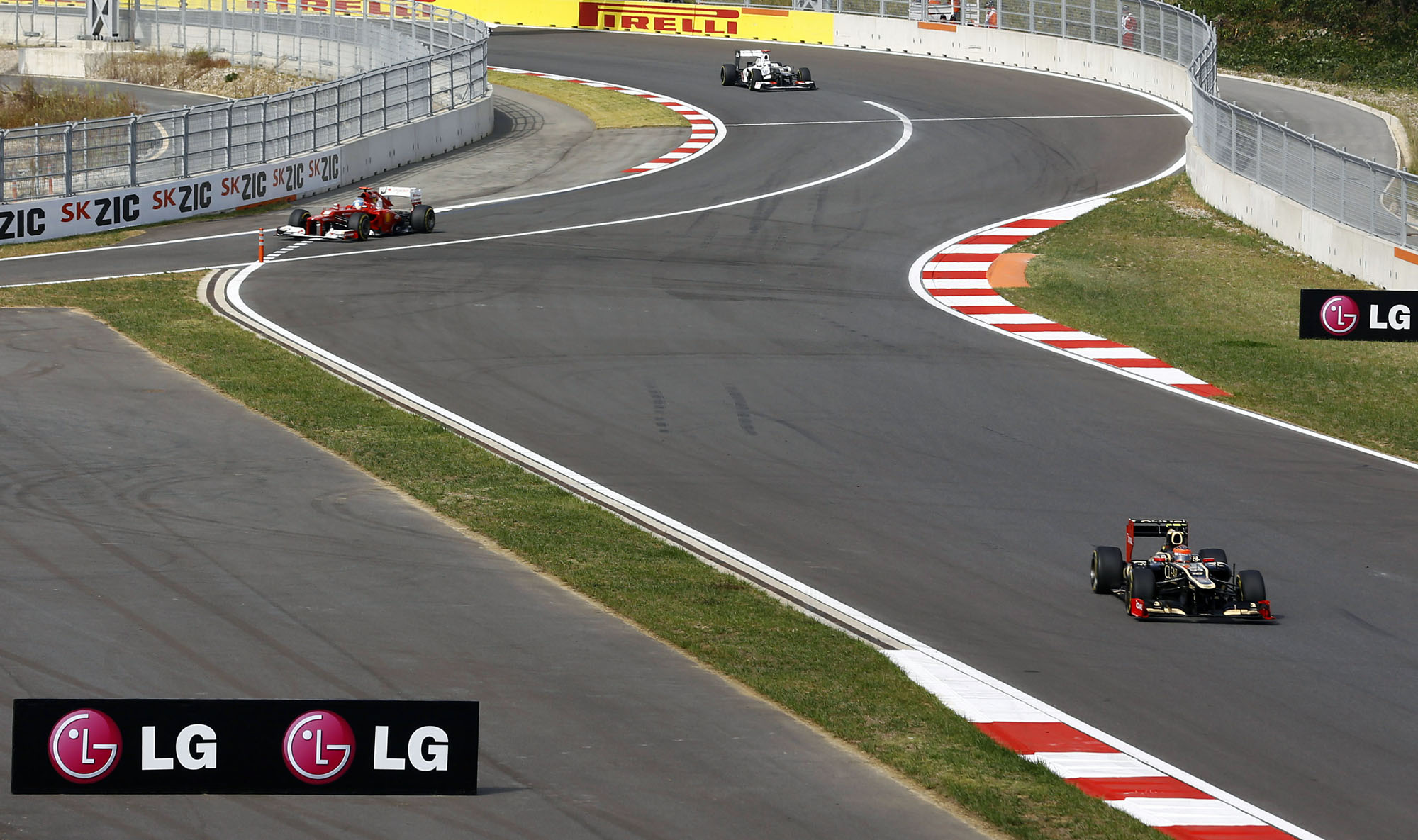
The pit lane entry as shown during the 2012 Korean Grand Prix.

The pit lane exit has also been criticised as it fed into the outside of Turn 1, despite original plans for a pit exit running around the outside of the turns 1 and 2 run off area. Although it was off the racing line, if drivers locked up at the turn and ran wide, they could hit someone exiting the pits. This happened during practice for the 2011 Korean Grand Prix when Mercedes' Nico Rosberg ran wide and hit Toro Rosso's Jaime Alguersuari. The exit was criticised by several drivers as well as Mercedes GP's team principal Ross Brawn. He said 'I have to say it's a little frustrating, with a brand new circuit like this, that we have that problem. Look at the number of cars that went off at turn one in first practice. With wet, difficult conditions, I think it was 20 or 30.' Red Bull team principal Christian Horner said it was 'an accident that was going to happen' given the poor design of the exit.' Nico Rosberg and Jarno Trulli also felt that the exit 'needed to be improved'. Following complaints from the drivers, the FIA installed a set of traffic lights at the end of the pit lane, warning drivers rejoining the race of cars approaching at race speeds. Teams also employed the use of spotters to warn drivers (both racing and exiting the pits) of any cars in the pit lane.

For the 2013 Korean Grand Prix the pit exit was extended out around turn 1 to rejoin the circuit at the end of turn 2, as was on the original plans for the track. The quality of the work has been called into question by many drivers, with many highlighting an uneven surface as being "not the standard that it should be". This is due to the pit lane being extended through the run off area, which has a drainage system running through it.

== Construction issues ==
Although completion of the circuit was due in July 2010, excessive rainfall caused delays in soil improvement. The construction delay caused the inspection by FIA to be delayed for 20 days to 11 October, 10 days before the Korean Grand Prix. However, some facilities were still incomplete, and the pavement was only paved up to the first layer.

== Events ==
Current

- May: Superrace Championship
- September: Superrace Championship

Former

- Asian Formula Renault Series (2016)
- Audi R8 LMS Cup (2014–2017)
- Blancpain GT World Challenge Asia (2019)
- China Touring Car Championship (2014–2016)
- Clio Cup China Series (2016)
- Formula One
  - Korean Grand Prix (2010–2013)
- GT Asia Series (2014–2016)
- Lamborghini Super Trofeo Asia (2013–2014, 2019)
- Porsche Carrera Cup Asia (2015, 2023)
- TCR Asia Series (2016, 2018)
- TCR Korea Touring Car Series (2018)

== Lap records ==
As of June 2023, the fastest official race lap records at the Korea International Circuit are listed as:

Category	Time	Driver	Vehicle	Event
Grand Prix Circuit (2010–present): 5.554 km (3.451 mi)
F1	1:39.605	Sebastian Vettel	Red Bull RB7	2011 Korean Grand Prix
GT3	2:07.380	Adderly Fong	Bentley Continental GT3	2016 Yeongam GT Asia round
Formula Renault 2.0	2:09.785	Josh Burdon	Tatuus FR2.0/13	2016 Yeongam Asian Formula Renault round
Lamborghini Super Trofeo	2:10.265	Afiq Ikhwan Yazid	Lamborghini Huracán Super Trofeo Evo	2019 Yeongam Lamborghini Super Trofeo Asia round
Porsche Carrera Cup	2:10.649	Luo Kailuo	Porsche 911 (992 I) GT3 Cup	2023 Yeongam Porsche Carrera Cup Asia round
TCR Touring Car	2:22.227	Kantadhee Kusiri	SEAT León TCR	2018 Yeongam TCR Asia Series round
GT4	2:22.504	Frank Yu	Mercedes-AMG GT4	2019 Yeongam Blancpain GT World Challenge Asia round
Clio Cup	2:37.236	Kenneth Lim	Renault Clio R.S. IV	2016 Yeongam Clio Cup China round
National Circuit (2010–present): 3.045 km (1.892 mi)
TCR Touring Car	1:20.191	Peter Terting	Hyundai i30 N TCR	2018 2nd Yeongam TCR Korea round

== See also ==
- List of Formula One circuits
