= Grand Slam (Formula One) =

Achievement in Formula One

A Grand Slam, also known by its French name grand chelem, is an achievement in Formula One where a driver fulfills the following criteria during a single race weekend:

- starts from pole position
- sets the fastest lap of the race
- leads every lap of the race
- wins the race

== History ==
The record for most Grand Slams is held by Jim Clark, with eight. Among active drivers, Lewis Hamilton and Max Verstappen have the joint most with six each.

Many world champions such as Giuseppe Farina, Graham Hill, John Surtees, Jochen Rindt, Emerson Fittipaldi, James Hunt, Mario Andretti, Jody Scheckter, Alan Jones, Keke Rosberg, Alain Prost, Jacques Villeneuve, Kimi Räikkönen, Jenson Button and (as of 2026) Lando Norris never achieved a single Grand Slam in their careers.

Both Ayrton Senna and Nelson Piquet earned their first Grand Slams in the same Grand Prix where they scored their first career victories.

The term should not be confused with the so-called "hat-trick", which is used when a driver achieves pole position, the fastest lap in the race, and wins the race, but without the requirement of leading every lap.

== List of Grand Slam winners ==
Wins	Driver	Grands Prix
8	(United Kingdom) Jim Clark	1962 British; 1963 Dutch; 1963 French; 1963 Mexican; 1964 British; 1965 South African; 1965 French; 1965 German
6	(United Kingdom) Lewis Hamilton	2014 Malaysian; 2015 Italian; 2017 Chinese; 2017 Canadian; 2017 British; 2019 Abu Dhabi
6	(Netherlands) Max Verstappen	2021 Austrian; 2022 Emilia Romagna; 2023 Spanish; 2023 Qatar; 2024 Bahrain; 2025 Azerbaijan
5	(Italy) Alberto Ascari	1952 French; 1952 German; 1952 Dutch; 1953 Argentine; 1953 British
5	(Germany) Michael Schumacher	1994 Monaco; 1994 Canadian; 2002 Spanish; 2004 Australian; 2004 Hungarian
4	(United Kingdom) Jackie Stewart	1969 French; 1971 Monaco; 1971 French; 1972 United States
4	(Brazil) Ayrton Senna	1985 Portuguese; 1989 Spanish; 1990 Monaco; 1990 Italian
4	(United Kingdom) Nigel Mansell	1991 British; 1992 South African; 1992 Spanish; 1992 British
4	(Germany) Sebastian Vettel	2011 Indian; 2012 Japanese; 2013 Singapore; 2013 Korean
3	(Brazil) Nelson Piquet	1980 United States West; 1981 Argentine; 1984 Canadian
2	(Argentina) Juan Manuel Fangio	1950 Monaco; 1956 German
2	(Australia) Jack Brabham	1960 Belgian; 1966 British
2	(Finland) Mika Häkkinen	1998 Brazilian; 1998 Monaco
2	(Germany) Nico Rosberg	2016 Russian; 2016 European
1	(United Kingdom) Mike Hawthorn	1958 French
1	(United Kingdom) Stirling Moss	1959 Portuguese
1	(Switzerland) Jo Siffert	1971 Austrian
1	(Belgium) Jacky Ickx	1972 German
1	(Switzerland) Clay Regazzoni	1976 United States West
1	(Austria) Niki Lauda	1976 Belgian
1	(France) Jacques Laffite	1979 Brazilian
1	(Canada) Gilles Villeneuve	1979 United States West
1	(Austria) Gerhard Berger	1987 Australian
1	(United Kingdom) Damon Hill	1995 Hungarian
1	(Spain) Fernando Alonso	2010 Singapore
1	(Monaco) Charles Leclerc	2022 Australian
1	(Australia) Oscar Piastri	2025 Dutch
1	(Italy) Kimi Antonelli	2026 Monaco
1	(United Kingdom) George Russell	2026 Azerbaijan
