= Yeongam County =

Coordinates: 34°47′54″N 126°42′00″E

Yeongam
- County
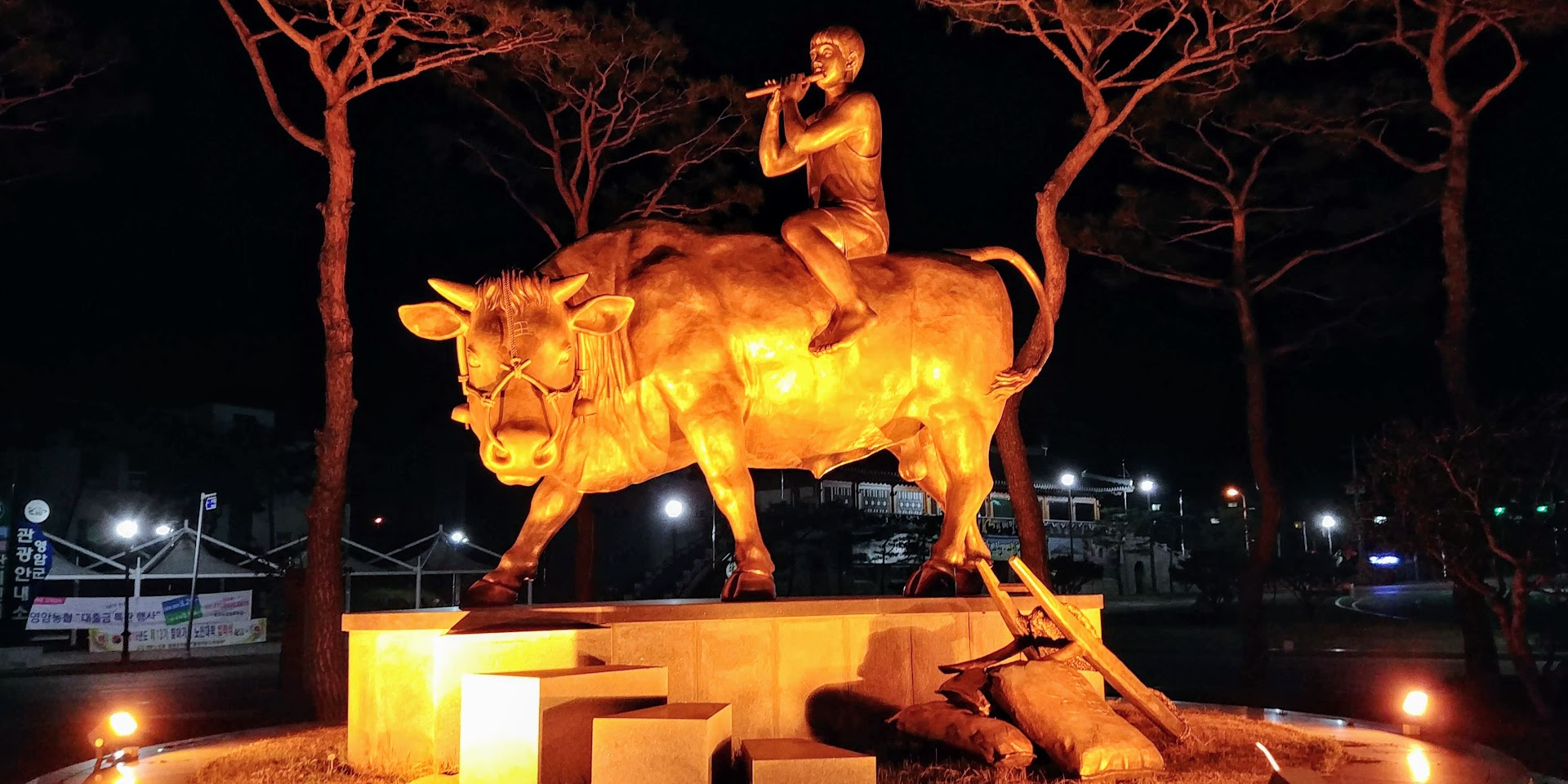
- Yeongam Symbolic herdboy Statue

- Flag Emblem of Yeongam

- Location in South Korea
- Country: South Korea
- Region: Honam
- Provincial-level city: Jeonnam-Gwangju
- Administrative divisions: 2 eups, 9 myeons

Area
  - Total: 544.48 km^{2} (210.22 sq mi)

Population (September 2024)
  - Total: 51,573
  - Density: 104.77/km^{2} (271.4/sq mi)
  - Dialect: Jeolla

Korean name
- Hangul: 영암군
- Hanja: 靈巖郡
- RR: Yeongam-gun
- MR: Yŏngam-gun

Yeongam County (Korean: 영암군; [jʌŋamɡun]) is a county in Jeonnam-Gwangju, South Korea. Bordered with Mokpo and Naju to the north, Jangheung County to the east, and Haenam and Gangjin to the south, Yeongam County comprises two eups and nine myeons, populated with about 57,000 people, and its county hall is seated in Yeongam-eup.

The Korean Grand Prix was held along the harbor side, at the Korea International Circuit from 2010 to 2013. The track has been designed by the famous race track designer Hermann Tilke. The circuit is part permanent, part temporary. Construction began in 2007, and was completed in September/October 2010. The circuit had a contract to host the Grand Prix until 2016. After that, a 5-year option would have to be picked up to keep the race until at least 2021. However the race was cancelled after 2013.

== History ==
Yeongam-gun (1899)

Many Bronze Age relics, including cut stone tools, were excavated in the current Yeongam area, and it appears that people have lived in groups since the Bronze Age. This area was a village named Wolnagun, which was part of the Baekje. It was renamed Yeongam-gun in 758.

== Industry ==
Hyundai Samho Heavy Industries (HSHI), world's 5th largest ship builder and the largest company in Jeonnam-Gwangju, is located in Samho Eup. Not only the company itself but also numerous cooperative firms of HSHI are headquartered in Daebul Industrial District in Samho Eup.

== Transport ==
Mokpo Air Base (formerly Mokpo Airport) is in Yeongam County.

== Twin towns – sister cities ==
Yeongam is twinned with:

- Yeongdeungpo-gu, Seoul, South Korea
- Sancheong, South Korea
- Huzhou, China
- Hirakata, Japan
