= 2010 Brazilian Grand Prix =

Formula One motor race held in 2010

Race 18 of 19 in the 2010 Formula One World Championship
| ← Previous race | Next race → |

Race details
- Date: 7 November 2010
- Official name: Formula 1 Grande Prêmio Petrobras do Brasil 2010
- Location: Autódromo José Carlos Pace, São Paulo, Brazil
- Course: Permanent racing facility
- Course length: 4.309 km (2.677 miles)
- Distance: 71 laps, 305.909 km (190.067 (Note: There was an 0.030 km (0.019 mi) offset between the start and finish lines.) miles)
- Weather: Clear; 25 °C (77 °F)
- Attendance: 157,582

Pole position
| Driver | (Germany) Nico Hülkenberg | Williams-Cosworth |
- Time: 1:14.470

Fastest lap
| Driver | (United Kingdom) Lewis Hamilton | McLaren-Mercedes |
- Time: 1:13.851 on lap 66

Podium
| First | (Germany) Sebastian Vettel | Red Bull-Renault |
| Second | (Australia) Mark Webber | Red Bull-Renault |
| Third | (Spain) Fernando Alonso | Ferrari |

The 2010 Brazilian Grand Prix (officially the Formula 1 Grande Prêmio Petrobras do Brasil 2010) was a Formula One motor race held at the Autódromo José Carlos Pace in the city of São Paulo on 7 November 2010 before 157,582 spectators. It was the 18th round of the 2010 Formula One World Championship and the 38th Brazilian Grand Prix to be held as part of the series. Red Bull driver Sebastian Vettel won the 71-lap race starting from second. His teammate Mark Webber finished second and Ferrari's Fernando Alonso third.

Entering the event, there were five drivers in contention to win the World Drivers' Championship while Red Bull led McLaren by 27 championship points in the World Constructors' Championship. Nico Hülkenberg for the Williams team took the first pole position of his career by recording the fastest lap time in the qualifying session. Vettel and Webber overtook Hülkenberg for the first two positions at the start of the race. Vettel was able to maintain the lead until his first pit stop to switch tyres and Webber led for two laps until he made his own pit stop. Vettel thereafter was able to maintain first position through negotiation of slower traffic for the rest of the race to take his fourth victory of the season and the ninth of his career. Webber was 4.2 seconds behind in second as Alonso drew closer to him in the final ten laps, albeit not close enough to pass and finished third.

The race result reduced Alonso's lead in the World Drivers' Championship to eight championship points over Webber. Vettel's victory moved him from fourth to third, past Hamilton. Button, the 2009 World Champion, was mathematically eliminated from retaining the championship after finishing fifth. This left Vettel, Alonso, Webber and Hamilton in contention of winning the World Drivers' Championship at the season-ending Abu Dhabi Grand Prix, marking the first time ever in Formula One's history that four drivers went to the season finale with the opportunity to win the title. With their drivers finishing first and second, Red Bull won its first World Constructors' Championship since it purchased Jaguar before 2005 since McLaren could not overtake its championship points total with one race remaining in the season.

== Background ==
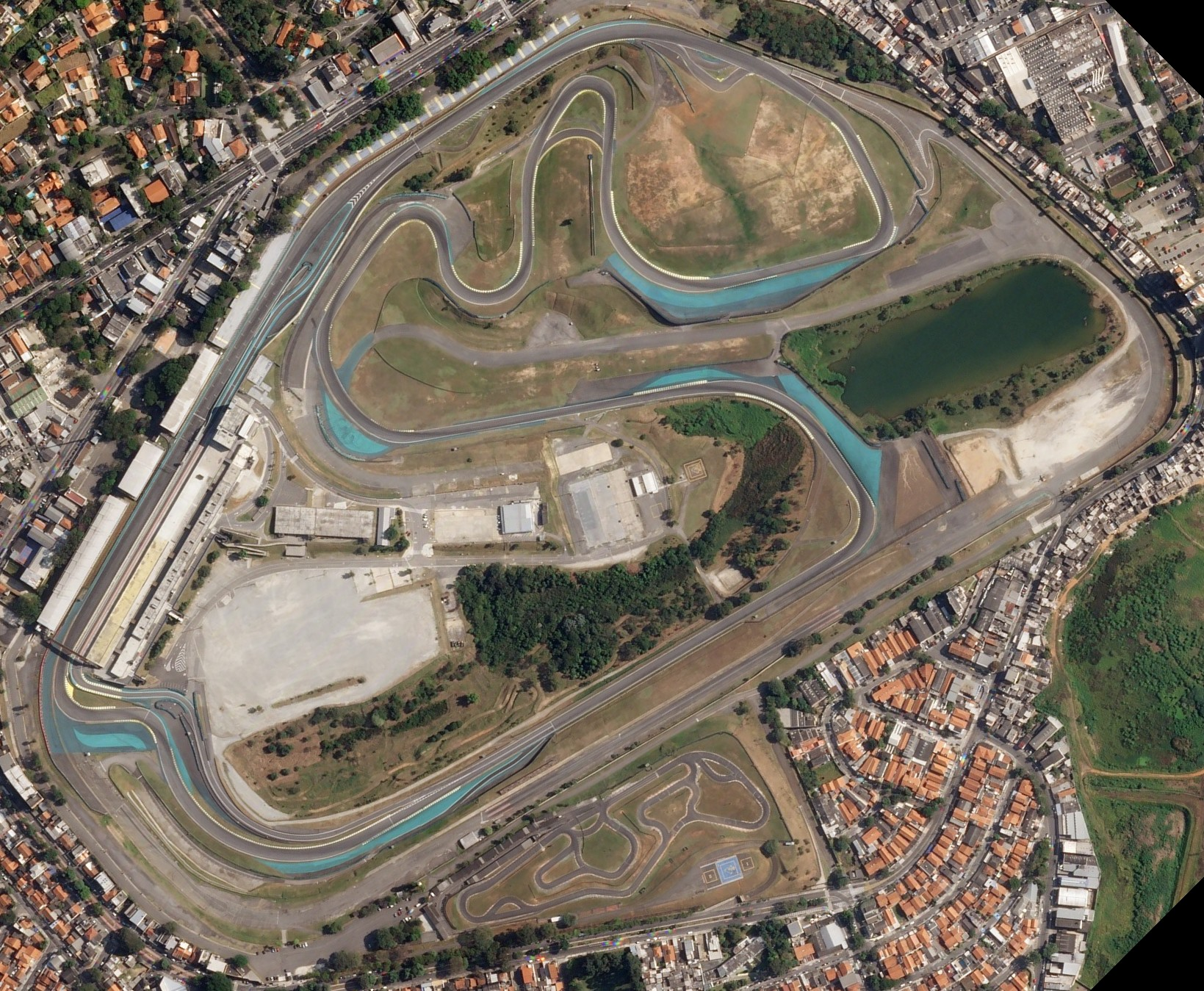
The Autódromo José Carlos Pace (pictured in 2018), where the race was held

The round was the 18th of the 19 races in the 2010 Formula One World Championship, and the 38th Brazilian Grand Prix held as part of the series. It was held at the 15-turn 4.309 km (2.677 mi) anti-clockwise Autódromo José Carlos Pace in São Paulo on 7 November. Tyre supplier Bridgestone provided the super soft green-banded and medium dry compounds and the intermediate and full-wet green-line central groove banded wet-weather compounds tyres to the race.

For the 2010 race, the organisers installed a 225 m (738 ft) long moveable steel and foam barrier to the outside of the Subida dos Boxes corner to absorb car impacts and drag it along as opposed to deflecting it back onto the track. (Note: The wall was installed in response to the fatal accident of driver Rafael Sperafico at the track in a 2007 Stock Car Brasil race.) 2 m (6.6 ft)-wide of artificial turf replaced the grass at Descida do Lago corner, at the exit to the Curva do Laranjinha corner and turn eight. New kerbs on the exit to Curva do Laranjinha, the Mergulho and Junção corners were fitted. The white lines denoting the boundaries of the track were coated with an anti-skid paint to improve adhesion in wet-weather.

Before the race, Ferrari driver Fernando Alonso led the World Drivers' Championship with 231 championship points, ahead of Red Bull's Mark Webber in second with 220 championship points and Lewis Hamilton of McLaren in third with 210 championship points. Webber's teammate Sebastian Vettel was fourth with 206 championship points and McLaren's Jenson Button was fifth with 189 championship points; all five drivers were mathematically in contention to win the World Drivers' Championship. A total of 50 championship points were available for the final two races, which meant Alonso could claim the title in Brazil if he won the race and Webber finished fifth or lower. Red Bull led the World Constructors' Championship with 426 championship points; McLaren and Ferrari were second and third with a respective 399 and 374 championship points. Mercedes on 188 championship points and Renault with 143 championship points battled for fourth place. Red Bull had to score 16 championship points more than McLaren to win the Constructors' Championship in Brazil.

At the previous race in Korea Alonso won ahead of Hamilton and Alonso's team-mate Massa. Of his championship rivals, Webber retired after he spun and hit Rosberg, Vettel's engine failed with ten laps to go and Button scored no championship points in 12th place. Ferrari team principal Stefano Domenicali said the team would be circumspect for the season's final two events due to what happened that year. Alonso, the pre-race favourite, for his part said he would not alter his approach in Brazil and anticipated Red Bull would be strong there. His teammate Felipe Massa said he expected to win the race and confirmed he would help Alonso's World Drivers' Championship chances. Hamilton said he would be satisfied if his teammate Button assisted his title ambitions, an act which McLaren team principal Martin Whitmarsh affirmed would not occur. Both drivers acknowledged the championship duel would be a difficult one.

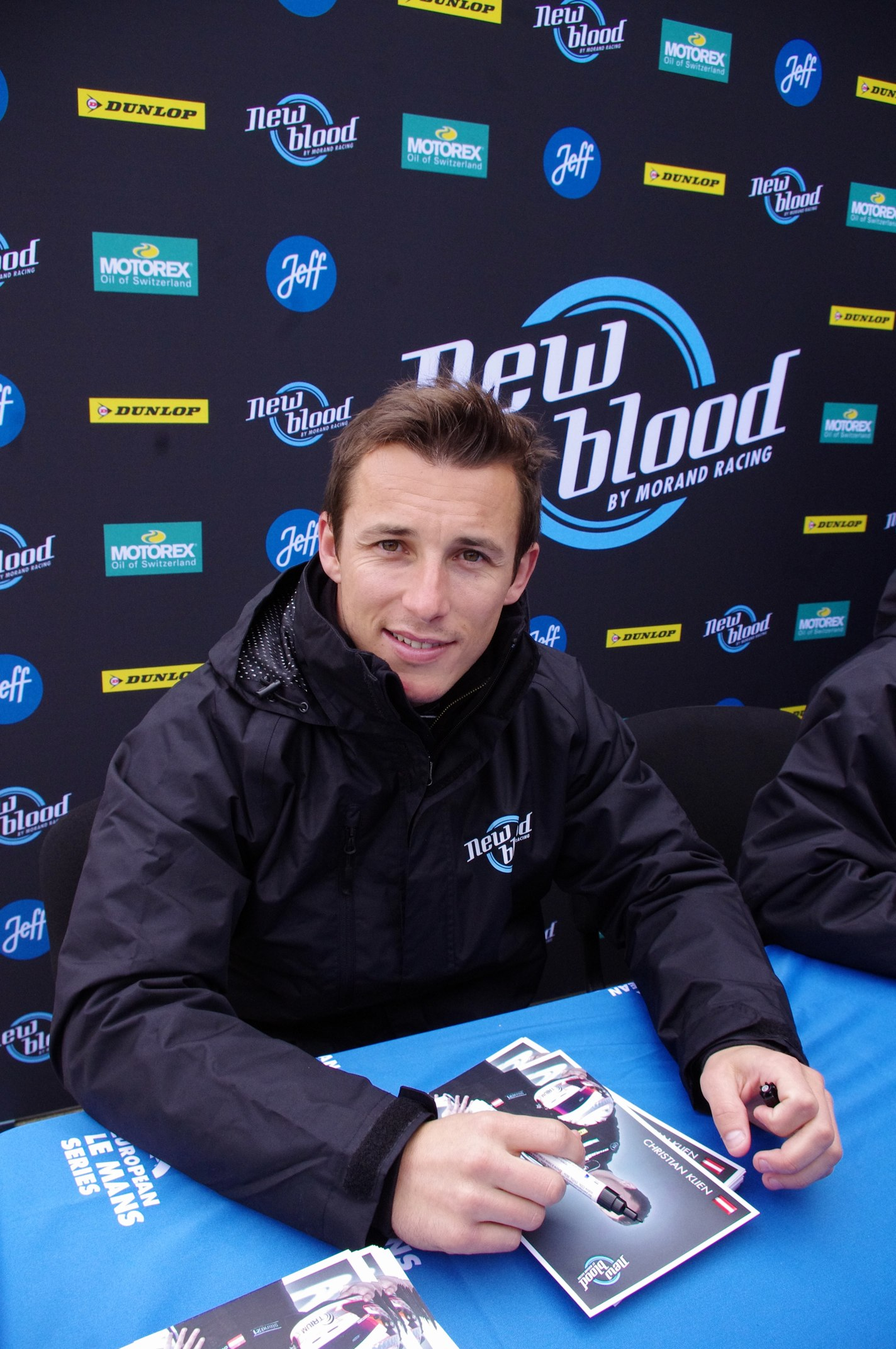
Christian Klien (pictured in 2014) took over Sakon Yamamoto's race seat at Hispania Racing for the event.

Some Formula One pundits suggested the Red Bull team would adopt a strategy in which Vettel would help Webber's title bid. Webber courted controversy when he suggested Red Bull would support his teammate Vettel over him: "It's obvious isn't it? Of course when young, new chargers come onto the block, that's where the emotion is. That's the way it is." His team principal Christian Horner believed Webber's words were taken out of context and that the driver was supported by the team and its owner Dietrich Mateschitz in the championship battle. Vettel remarked: "If Mark needs help then he should take the medical car", and said he received no preferential treatment at Red Bull due to a car that was capable of winning races.

The Grand Prix was entered by 12 teams (each represented by a constructor) and 24 drivers participated, with one pre-race driver change. The day before the first practice session, Hispania Racing for unexplained reasons announced Christian Klien would drive in lieu of Sakon Yamamoto whom Klien had also deputised for at the Singapore Grand Prix two months prior. Force India cancelled a first practice session outing for third driver Paul di Resta because the team wanted to provide Adrian Sutil and Vitantonio Liuzzi with additional track acclimatisation in the battle for sixth place in the World Constructors' Championship with Williams.

Some teams made changes to their cars for the race. Ferrari and Williams modified their brake ducts as teams aimed to optimise aerodynamic efficiency in the season's final races. Ferrari's alterations added a small fin to the front brake ducts to extract additional downforce. Williams' design was designed to recover as much downforce as possible with the installation of fins on the rear brake ducts and to receive air extracted from the FW32's exhausts. The team also installed a new engine in Rubens Barrichello's car.

== Practice ==
Per the regulations for the 2010 season, three practice sessions were held, two 90-minute sessions on Friday morning and afternoon and another 60-minute session on Saturday morning. In the first practice session, Vettel was fastest with a lap of 1:12.328, followed by his teammate Webber, the McLaren pair of Hamilton and Button, who tested aerodynamic adjustments to their MP4-25 cars, Renault's Robert Kubica, Mercedes' Nico Rosberg, Barrichello, Michael Schumacher for Mercedes, Sutil and Nick Heidfeld of Sauber. During the session Vitaly Petrov lost control of his Renault cresting a hill to the Ferradura turn and damaged its front-right corner in a collision with the outside tyre wall. Not long after Kamui Kobayashi spun at the same corner and loosened his Sauber's right-rear tyre from its rim against a barrier. Alonso's high-mileage engine failed two laps earlier than anticipated and Ferrari changed engines.

Vettel duplicated his first practice result in the second session with the day's fastest lap, a 1:11.938. His teammate Webber was 0.104 seconds slower in second. The Ferrari duo of Alonso and Massa were third and fifth; Hamilton separated the two. Kubica, Button, Heidfeld and the Mercedes pair of Rosberg and Schumacher followed in the top ten. Massa's session ended after one hour with a disengaged clutch caused by an electrical fault from running wide and mounting a kerb at the Senna S chicane. He stopped at the side of the circuit on the Reta Oposta straight between the Senna S chicane and the Descica do Lago corner. Schumacher attempted to pass Jaime Alguersuari's Toro Rosso car on the inside into the Senna S chicane and the two made contact at its apex. Schumacher appeared to suddenly brake test Alguersuari. Soon after Kobayashi avoided contact with the pit lane wall after veering out of the slipstream of Heikki Kovalainen's slower Lotus braking for the Senna S chicane.

Rain briefly fell in São Paulo on the night of 5 November and returned the next morning. Weather forecasts suggested more rain would fall, albeit not to the same intensity than in qualifying in Japan and Korea. This created a damp track, prompting drivers to use wet-weather tyres. Several drivers tested their cars to see how they would behave in qualifying with five minutes to go. Kubica used the intermediate tyres to lap fastest at 1:19.191, three-tenths of a second faster than Vettel in second. Hamilton, Massa, Alonso, Petrov, Toro Rosso driver Sébastien Buemi, Rosberg, Button and Barrichello made up positions three to ten. During the session Button lacked front-end grip and his teammate Hamilton made two errors.

== Qualifying ==
Saturday afternoon's qualifying session was split into three parts. The first session ran for 20 minutes, eliminating cars that finished 18th or lower. The second session lasted 15 minutes, eliminating cars that finished 11th to 17th. The final session ran for ten minutes and determined pole position to tenth. Cars in the final session were not allowed to change tyres, using the tyres with which they set their quickest lap times. The first two sessions and the first minutes of the final session were run on a damp circuit, and as such, drivers used intermediate compound tyres. After lap times were 108 per cent slower than in dry weather, every driver changed to dry weather tyres with five minutes to go when a dry line emerged and increased grip because the track was drying fast enough to make it feasible.

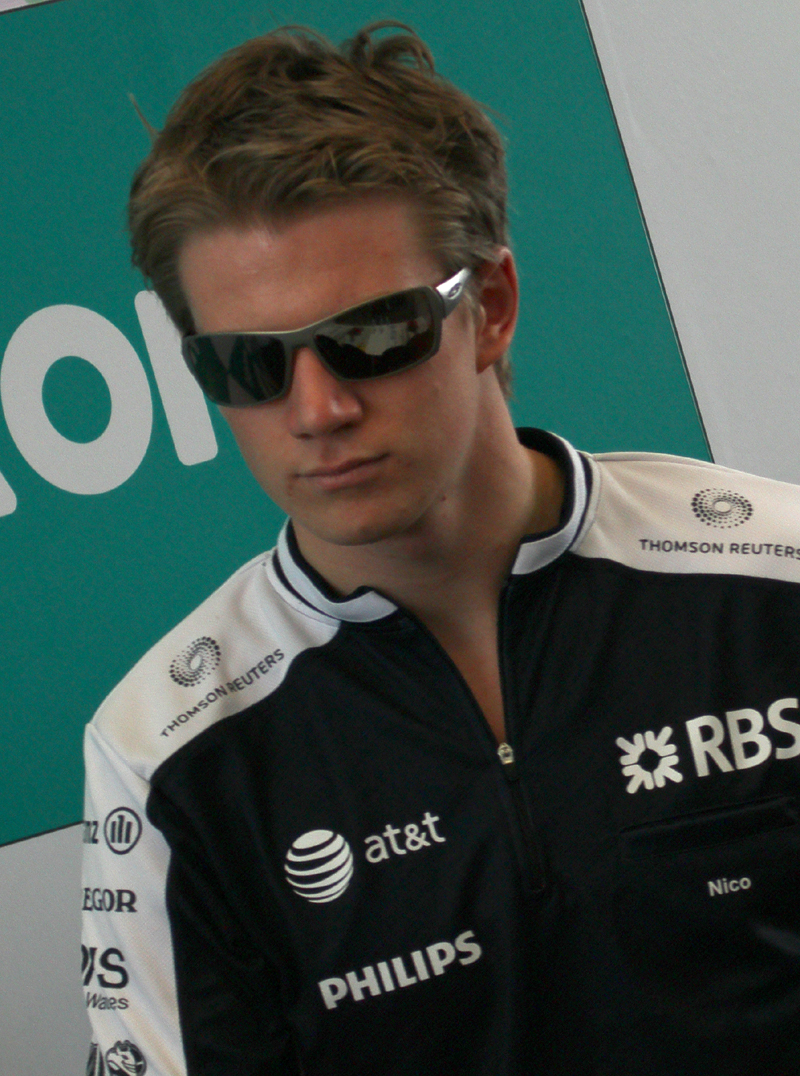
Nico Hülkenberg took the first pole position of his career and the Williams team's first since the 2005 European Grand Prix.

Williams driver Nico Hülkenberg ran more front wing angle than Barrichello, and used super soft tyres earlier than the fastest teams after his teammate Barrichello told the Williams team that the track was dry. His final lap of 1:14.470 earned him the first pole position of his career and the Williams team's first since the 2005 European Grand Prix. (Note: It was the first pole position for Williams' engine supplier Cosworth since Barrichello drove for the Stewart squad at the 1999 French Grand Prix and the first for a Williams-Cosworth car in Brazil since Keke Rosberg at the 1983 race.) He was joined on the grid's front row by Vettel and Webber took third after traffic slowed both drivers. Hamilton qualified fourth because he could not extract temperature in his tyres and another vehicle slightly delayed him at Arquibancas corner. Alonso was fastest in the first session; he fell to fifth in the final session from losing time going onto a damp area and losing tyre temperature. Barrichello, sixth, lost 17 seconds on his first lap out of the pit lane with Hamilton ahead of him and going wide. Going wide at Junçao corner on dry tyres, and a car with a low downforce setup put Kubica seventh. Schumacher in eighth ran onto a damp patch towards the end of the third session to allow the Red Bull cars past and lost tyre temperature. A lack of grip left Massa ninth. Petrov, tenth, made the final session for the first time since the Hungarian Grand Prix three months prior and was the highest-placed rookie driver.

Button was the fastest driver not to progress to the final session after Massa demoted him to 11th in the closing seconds of the second session; a lack of grip on a set of damaged intermediate tyres and brake and tyre temperature slowed him. Tyre wear left Kobayashi 12th. Rosberg set the 13th-fastest lap and was slower than his teammate Schumacher for the fourth time in 2010, attributing the result to Buemi slowing his fastest lap. Alguersuari was the faster Toro Rosso driver in 14th, qualifying ahead of his teammate Buemi in 15th for the fourth race in a row. Heidfeld was 16th-quickest, feeling he changed tyres too early. Liuzzi in 17th lost control of his car and spun into the path of Sutil and Kobayashi. Sutil failed to advance beyond the first session with a lack of grip on his final timed lap that left him in 18th. Timo Glock of the Virgin team in 19th found switching to a second set of intermediate tyres slowed him. Kovalainen and his Lotus teammate Jarno Trulli were 20th and 21st after traffic prevented the duo from improving their laps. Lucas di Grassi for Virgin in 22nd was seven-tenths of a second slower than Glock. The Hispania cars of Klien and Bruno Senna occupied the grid's final row: Klien lost time on his final timed lap due to rain, and Senna was seven-tenths of a second slower since he completed a single lap on the damp track and spun towards the end of the first session.

=== Post-qualifying ===
After the session, Buemi and Sutil each took a five-place grid penalty because the stewards deemed them to have caused separate collisions with Glock and Kobayashi at the preceding Korean Grand Prix. Both drivers were required to start from 20th and 22nd, respectively. This moved Heidfeld to 15th, Liuzzi 16th, Glock 17th, Trulli 18th, Kovalainen 20th and Di Grassi 21st. Rosberg reported Buemi impeding him in the second session to the stewards, who rejected the complaint after scrutiny.

=== Qualifying classification ===
The fastest lap in each of the three sessions is denoted in bold.

| Pos. | No. | Driver | Constructor | Q1 | Q2 | Q3 | Grid |
|---|---|---|---|---|---|---|---|
| 1 | 10 | (Germany) Nico Hülkenberg | Williams-Cosworth | 1:20.050 | 1:19.144 | **1:14.470** | 1 |
| 2 | 5 | (Germany) Sebastian Vettel | Red Bull-Renault | 1:19.160 | 1:18.691 | 1:15.519 | 2 |
| 3 | 6 | (Australia) Mark Webber | Red Bull-Renault | 1:19.025 | **1:18.516** | 1:15.637 | 3 |
| 4 | 2 | (United Kingdom) Lewis Hamilton | McLaren-Mercedes | 1:19.931 | 1:18.921 | 1:15.747 | 4 |
| 5 | 8 | (Spain) Fernando Alonso | Ferrari | **1:18.987** | 1:19.010 | 1:15.989 | 5 |
| 6 | 9 | (Brazil) Rubens Barrichello | Williams-Cosworth | 1:19.799 | 1:18.925 | 1:16.203 | 6 |
| 7 | 11 | (Poland) Robert Kubica | Renault | 1:19.249 | 1:18.877 | 1:16.552 | 7 |
| 8 | 3 | (Germany) Michael Schumacher | Mercedes | 1:19.879 | 1:18.923 | 1:16.925 | 8 |
| 9 | 7 | (Brazil) Felipe Massa | Ferrari | 1:19.778 | 1:19.200 | 1:17.101 | 9 |
| 10 | 12 | (Russia) Vitaly Petrov | Renault | 1:20.189 | 1:19.153 | 1:17.656 | 10 |
| 11 | 1 | (United Kingdom) Jenson Button | McLaren-Mercedes | 1:19.905 | 1:19.288 | N/A | 11 |
| 12 | 23 | (Japan) Kamui Kobayashi | BMW Sauber-Ferrari | 1:19.741 | 1:19.385 | N/A | 12 |
| 13 | 4 | (Germany) Nico Rosberg | Mercedes | 1:20.153 | 1:19.486 | N/A | 13 |
| 14 | 17 | (Spain) Jaime Alguersuari | Toro Rosso-Ferrari | 1:20.158 | 1:19.581 | N/A | 14 |
| 15 | 16 | (Switzerland) Sébastien Buemi | Toro Rosso-Ferrari | 1:20.096 | 1:19.847 | N/A | 19^{1} |
| 16 | 22 | (Germany) Nick Heidfeld | BMW Sauber-Ferrari | 1:20.174 | 1:19.899 | N/A | 15 |
| 17 | 15 | (Italy) Vitantonio Liuzzi | Force India-Mercedes | 1:20.592 | 1:20.357 | N/A | 16 |
| 18 | 14 | (Germany) Adrian Sutil | Force India-Mercedes | 1:20.830 | N/A | N/A | 22^{1} |
| 19 | 24 | (Germany) Timo Glock | Virgin-Cosworth | 1:22.130 | N/A | N/A | 17 |
| 20 | 18 | (Italy) Jarno Trulli | Lotus-Cosworth | 1:22.250 | N/A | N/A | 18 |
| 21 | 19 | (Finland) Heikki Kovalainen | Lotus-Cosworth | 1:22.378 | N/A | N/A | 20 |
| 22 | 25 | (Brazil) Lucas di Grassi | Virgin-Cosworth | 1:22.810 | N/A | N/A | 21 |
| 23 | 20 | (Austria) Christian Klien | HRT-Cosworth | 1:23.083 | N/A | N/A | PL^{2} |
| 24 | 21 | (Brazil) Bruno Senna | HRT-Cosworth | 1:23.796 | N/A | N/A | 24^{3} |

Notes:

- **^1** – Sébastien Buemi and Adrian Sutil were each handed a five-place grid penalty for causing separate "avoidable accidents" with Timo Glock and Kamui Kobayashi respectively at the Korean Grand Prix.
- **^2** – Christian Klien started from pit-lane after he stopped with fluctuating fuel pressure on the way to the grid.
- **^3** – Bruno Senna handed a five-place grid penalty for changing his gearbox.

== Race ==
The 71-lap race took place in the afternoon over a distance of 305.909 km (190.083 mi) from 14:00 Brasilia Time (UTC−02:00) in front of a crowd of 157,582 spectators. The weather at the start was dry and clear, with the air temperature between 24 and 25 °C (75 and 77 °F) and the track temperature from 47 to 51 °C (117 to 124 °F); conditions were expected to remain consistent throughout the race, and no rain was forecast. Klien stopped his car at the exit to the pit lane and failed to start due to fluctuating fuel pressure. Trackside equipment moved his car to the pit lane, where the Hispania Racing mechanics repaired it. When the race commenced, Hülkenberg spun his tyres, allowing Vettel to pass him on the inside for the lead into the Senna S chicane. Webber held off Hamilton on the outside for third place. At the exit to the Descica do Lago corner Webber lined up a pass on Hülkenberg on the Reta Oposta straight. An oversteer stopped Hülkenberg from accelerating early and his braking early let Webber into second place on the outside. Hamilton, in an unbalanced car, was able to fend off Alonso on the inside at the exit of Descica do Lago turn for fifth and continued to do so for the rest of the lap.

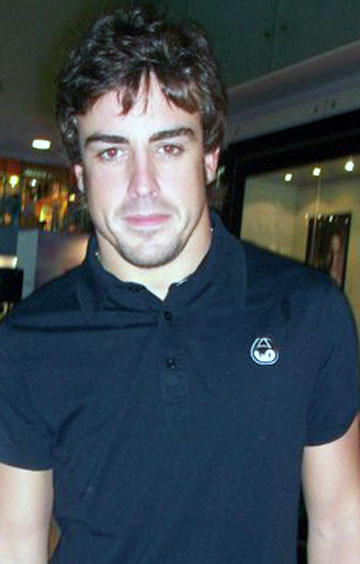
Fernando Alonso (pictured at the Singapore Grand Prix) finished third and remained in the lead of the World Drivers' Championship.

Behind the first four drivers, Schumacher fell to tenth due to a driver error putting him onto the grass. Kubica moved from seventh to sixth and Button advanced from 11th to ninth. Petrov made a slow start, mounting a kerb at the exit of the Senna S Chicane to avoid colliding with Alguersuari and fell to 22nd. Towards the end of lap one, Hamilton was slow out of Junção turn, allowing Alonso to challenge him on the main straight, but Hamilton retained fourth place at the Senna S chicane. Alonso tried again and took fourth from Hamilton after Descica do Lago turn. Alonso immediately began to gain on Hülkenberg. On lap three, Schumacher passed Button before the Senna S chicane for ninth place. Alonso closed up to Hülkenberg and began to pressure him for third position.

At the start of lap four, Alonso steered right to attempt to overtake Hülkenberg; the latter blocked Alonso into the Senna S chicane; Hülkenberg ran with his rear wing at a high angle, making him vulnerable to a pass and it required him to steer left and brake later than Alonso. On lap five, Alonso again failed to pass Hülkenberg on the outside into the Senna S chicane. This allowed Hamilton to close up to Alonso, albeit not close enough to pass him. On the seventh lap, Alonso slipstreamed Hülkenberg, who ran wide at the entry to the Descica do Lago turn and Alonso drew alongside Hülkenberg before passing him on the inside cresting a hill towards Ferradura corner for third position. The time Alonso lost behind Hülkenberg was ten seconds, dropping him 11 seconds behind Vettel.

On lap eight, Hamilton made an unsuccessful overtake on the outside of Hülkenberg for fourth into the Senna S chicane. This was due to a lack of tyre grip, and he sought to conserve his tyres since he did not want to overheat them in the aerodynamic turbulence created by the airflow over the rear of Hülkenberg's car. In his first lap out of aerodynamic turbulence, Alonso was unable to close up to the Red Bull cars; Vettel opted to avoid tyre strain and losing grip in case of a safety car deployment. Hülkenberg blocked Hamilton from passing him on the inside at the start of the 11th lap, notwithstanding Hamilton's more powerful engine. They drew alongside going into Descica do Lago turn as Hülkenberg maintained fourth.

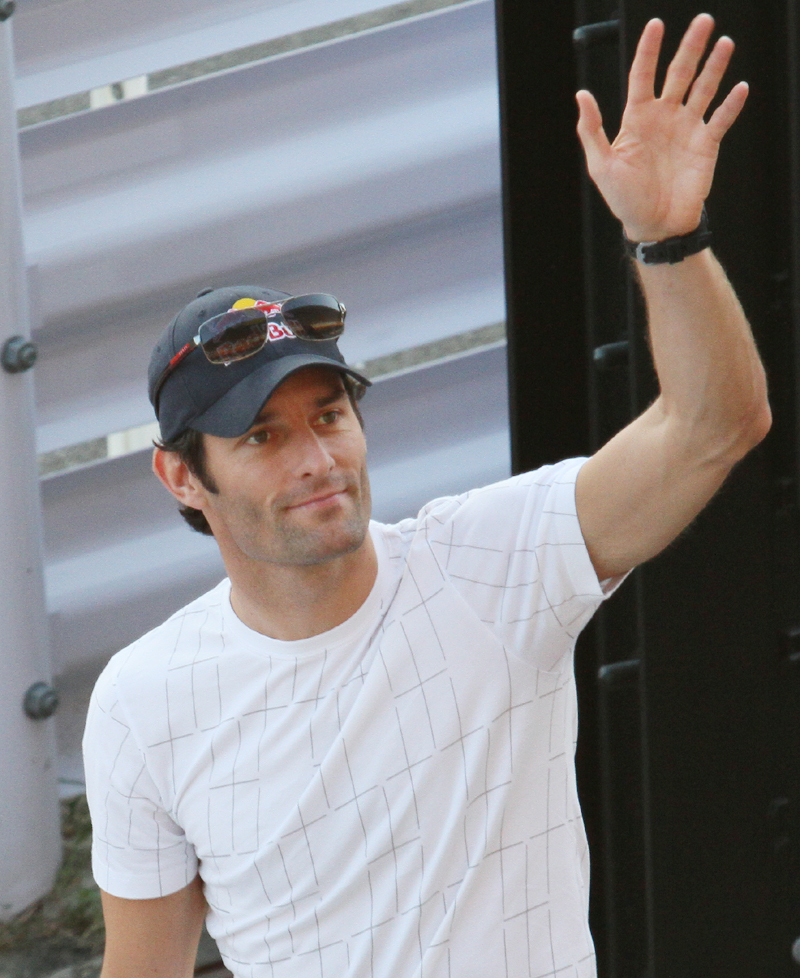
Mark Webber started from third and improved to a second-place finish

At the conclusion of the same lap, Button, separated by slower cars, made the race's first pit stop to switch onto the medium compound tyres, emerging in 18th position. Button's faster pace meant he was followed in due course by: Massa, Barrichello, Hülkenberg, Kubica, Heidfeld, Alguersuari, Liuzzi and Buemi over the next seven laps. Massa and Barrichello each had wheel nut installation problems, requiring them to make a second pit stop. Both drivers rejoined behind Button. Hamilton made his first stop for the medium compound tyres on lap 21. He emerged in sixth position, narrowly ahead of his teammate Button. At the front of the field, Alonso entered the pit lane to switch to the medium compound tyres on the 25th lap, continuing in third position. Vettel followed suit on the end of the lap, and relinquished the lead to his teammate Webber on laps 25 and 26 until the latter's own stop on lap 26. After the pit stops, the gap to Vettel and his teammate Webber was less than three seconds. Alonso was a further 10 seconds behind in third place, and 10 in front of Hamilton in fourth.

On lap 30, Button overtook the yet-to-pit Kobayashi on the inside into the Senna S chicane for fifth position. Barrichello attempted to pass Alguersuari for 13th on the outside at the same corner five laps later and the two made contact. Barrichello sustained a front-left puncture and slowed en route to the pit lane for super soft tyres. He rejoined the race one lap behind Vettel. Four laps later, Rosberg overtook Kobayashi on the inside into the Senna S chicane for sixth place. At the front, the Red Bull duo of Vettel and Webber appeared they would remain in first and second. Red Bull radioed Webber to lower the performance of his overheating engine from having less water temperature. Nevertheless, slower traffic allowed him to close up to Vettel to 1.5 seconds. In the meantime, Di Grassi entered the Virgin team's garage on the 44th lap to rectify a worsening rear suspension fault. He rejoined the race four laps later.

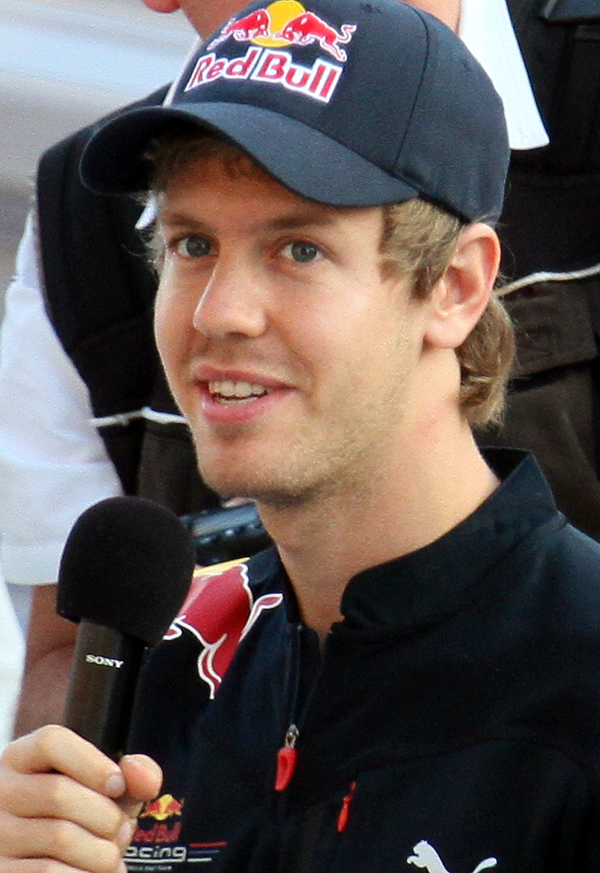
Sebastian Vettel (pictured at the Japanese Grand Prix one month prior) took his fourth victory of the season and the ninth of his career.

Lap 51 saw the sole safety car deployment. Liuzzi lost control of his car on a kerb to the outside of the second Senna S chicane due to a suspected front suspension failure. He crashed into a barrier to the track's inside at the bottom of a hill before the exit of the turn. Liuzzi was unhurt; a suspension rocker penetrated his car's left-front monocoque and touched his foot. His car was deemed to be in a dangerous position and a recovery tractor moved it. Under the safety car, several drivers made pit stops to replace worn tyres. McLaren called Hamilton and Button into the pit lane for a second pit stop to switch to a new set of tyres in an attempt to move up the field. Both drivers lost no positions. Mercedes asked Rosberg to make a pit stop to challenge Button at the rolling restart; a miscommunication between Rosberg's race engineer Jock Clear and the Mercedes mechanics over which type of tyre to use meant they readied the mediums instead of the super softs Clear had requested. Ultimately, Rosberg's mechanics fitted an old set of tyres; he completed an additional lap before they installed the super soft tyre compound on his car.

After Liuzzi's car was removed the track, the safety car was withdrawn at the conclusion of lap 55 and racing resumed. Vettel led as lapped drivers separated him, Webber and Alonso in second and third. The first three lapped faster than they had done before the safety car and prevented Hamilton and Button from gaining further positions. Alonso managed the wear on his tyres to allow for a challenge to Webber, who was distanced by his teammate Vettel with a sequence of faster lap times. On lap 65, Kobayashi passed Alguerusari for tenth place. Not long after the stewards informed the Sauber team that Heidfeld was deemed to have ignored blue flags instructing him to allow faster cars past and imposed a drive-through penalty. He took the penalty on the 66th lap and lost 14 seconds.

Alonso closed to within six seconds of race leader Vettel, as Red Bull did not invoke team orders to instruct Vettel to hand the victory to Webber and improve his teammate's position in the World Drivers' Championship. Vettel finished first for his fourth victory of the season and the ninth of his career. The win, along with Webber's second-place finish won Red Bull the 2010 World Constructors' Championship since no other team could pass its championship points total with one race of the season left for the team's first since its Formula One debut in 2005. Alonso took third with the McLaren pair of Hamilton and Button fourth and fifth, almost one second separating the two drivers. Schumacher allowed Rosberg past after the safety car was withdrawn as his teammate had a new set of tyres and was better able to challenge Button; the two ended the race in sixth and seventh. Hülkenberg, Kubica who could not extract more speed from his car on the straight due to rev limiter problems keeping him behind Hülkenberg and Kobayashi rounded out the top ten. Alguersuari, Sutil, Buemi, Barrichello, Massa, Petrov, Heidfeld, Kovalainen and Trulli made up positions 11 to 19. Glock finished 20th, one second ahead of Senna in 21st, with Klien registering his first finish since the 2006 German Grand Prix and was the final classified finisher.

== Post-race ==
The top three drivers appeared on the podium to collect their trophies and spoke to the media in a later press conference. Vettel said it was important for him to pull away from Hülkenberg after he passed him: "The car felt fantastic. All throughout the race I was able to hold the gaps as I planned, so I could control the race from there. With the safety car in the end it was the right choice not to try to pull away too much, to have some tyres left." Webber agreed the start was the most important aspect of the race and said of the importance: "Most of the races are decided as we know pretty much on the Saturday or the first lap. You can follow each other around but eventually... in the old days you could play with the strategy a little bit, change the fuel loads and have a look at going long or a bit shorter." Alonso believed he attempted to perform to the best of his ability and a higher starting position would have allowed him to pass a Red Bull car at the start: "We are very close in race pace, maybe one or two-tenths quicker some laps, one or two-tenths slower some of the laps, so when you lose 12 seconds probably it is over."

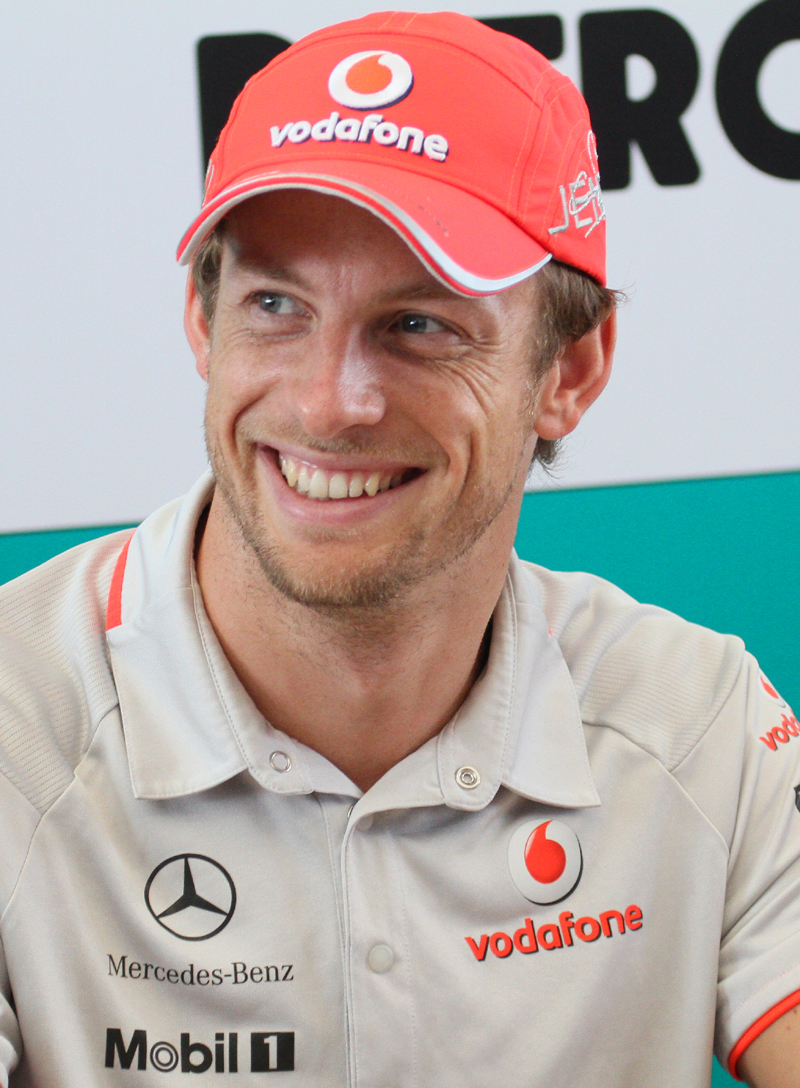
Jenson Button (pictured at the Malaysian Grand Prix seven months prior) was mathematically eliminated from the World Drivers' Championship with a fifth-place finish.

Afterwards, the Red Bull team celebrated their first World Constructors' Championship. Christian Horner commented on how Red Bull was regarded as "a party team" after they purchased Jaguar in 2005: "In six years, this team has come from a team that no-one took seriously – that everyone thought was a party team – to the 2010 F1 constructors' champions. We have finished ahead of teams with far more experience and heritage than ourselves – we took them on and we won, thanks to the tremendous dedication of every single team member, the incredible support from Red Bull and the vision and unfaltering commitment from Mr. Mateschitz." Adrian Newey, the team's technical director, thanked aerodynamicist Peter Prodromou and designer Rob Marshall for their work to the RB6 in Milton Keynes. Vettel stated Red Bull's Constructors' Championship win was special to him because he had visited the team's factory in Milton Keynes in 2005 and was intrigued by the experience: "Looking up to Formula One and now to be part of the team and part of the driver line-up to give them their first championship is incredible".

Hülkenberg said he was happy to finish the race in eighth position and promoted Williams to sixth in the Constructors' Championship. After he finished fifth, Button was mathematically prevented from retaining the World Drivers' Championship. He said he would enter the final race of the season in Abu Dhabi with no concerns and that he would use his experience from the season to improve for 2011. His teammate Hamilton commented on his prospects of title success in the season-finale: "In Abu Dhabi I'll be doing everything I can to pull off the win I need, and hoping the other guys hit problems. As always, we won't give up and we'll keep on pushing."

The race result meant Webber lowered Alonso's lead in the World Drivers' Championship to eight championship points. Vettel's victory elevated him ahead of Hamilton to third place as Button maintained fifth place. In the World Constructors' Championship, Red Bull finished first with 469 championship points. McLaren were second with 421 championship points and Ferrari were another 32 championship points behind in third position. Mercedes secured fourth place from Renault with one race left in the season.

=== Race classification ===
Drivers who scored championship points are denoted in bold.

| Pos | No. | Driver | Constructor | Laps | Time/Retired | Grid | Points |
|---|---|---|---|---|---|---|---|
| 1 | 5 | (Germany) **Sebastian Vettel** | **Red Bull-Renault** | 71 | 1:33:11.803 | 2 | 25 |
| 2 | 6 | (Australia) **Mark Webber** | **Red Bull-Renault** | 71 | +4.243 | 3 | 18 |
| 3 | 8 | (Spain) **Fernando Alonso** | **Ferrari** | 71 | +6.807 | 5 | 15 |
| 4 | 2 | (United Kingdom) **Lewis Hamilton** | **McLaren-Mercedes** | 71 | +14.634 | 4 | 12 |
| 5 | 1 | (United Kingdom) **Jenson Button** | **McLaren-Mercedes** | 71 | +15.593 | 11 | 10 |
| 6 | 4 | (Germany) **Nico Rosberg** | **Mercedes** | 71 | +35.320 | 13 | 8 |
| 7 | 3 | (Germany) **Michael Schumacher** | **Mercedes** | 71 | +43.456 | 8 | 6 |
| 8 | 10 | (Germany) **Nico Hülkenberg** | **Williams-Cosworth** | 70 | +1 Lap | 1 | 4 |
| 9 | 11 | (Poland) **Robert Kubica** | **Renault** | 70 | +1 Lap | 7 | 2 |
| 10 | 23 | (Japan) **Kamui Kobayashi** | **BMW Sauber-Ferrari** | 70 | +1 Lap | 12 | 1 |
| 11 | 17 | (Spain) Jaime Alguersuari | Toro Rosso-Ferrari | 70 | +1 Lap | 14 | |
| 12 | 14 | (Germany) Adrian Sutil | Force India-Mercedes | 70 | +1 Lap | 22 | |
| 13 | 16 | (Switzerland) Sébastien Buemi | Toro Rosso-Ferrari | 70 | +1 Lap | 19 | |
| 14 | 9 | (Brazil) Rubens Barrichello | Williams-Cosworth | 70 | +1 Lap | 6 | |
| 15 | 7 | (Brazil) Felipe Massa | Ferrari | 70 | +1 Lap | 9 | |
| 16 | 12 | (Russia) Vitaly Petrov | Renault | 70 | +1 Lap | 10 | |
| 17 | 22 | (Germany) Nick Heidfeld | BMW Sauber-Ferrari | 70 | +1 Lap | 15 | |
| 18 | 19 | (Finland) Heikki Kovalainen | Lotus-Cosworth | 69 | +2 Laps | 20 | |
| 19 | 18 | (Italy) Jarno Trulli | Lotus-Cosworth | 69 | +2 Laps | 18 | |
| 20 | 24 | (Germany) Timo Glock | Virgin-Cosworth | 69 | +2 Laps | 17 | |
| 21 | 21 | (Brazil) Bruno Senna | HRT-Cosworth | 69 | +2 Laps | 24 | |
| 22 | 20 | (Austria) Christian Klien | HRT-Cosworth | 65 | +6 Laps | 23 | |
| NC | 25 | (Brazil) Lucas di Grassi | Virgin-Cosworth | 62 | +9 Laps | 21 | |
| Ret | 15 | (Italy) Vitantonio Liuzzi | Force India-Mercedes | 49 | Accident | 16 | |

Notes:

- Lucas di Grassi was not classified as he completed less than 90% of the race.

== Championship standings after the race ==
Drivers' Championship standings

| +/– | Pos | Driver | Points |
|---|---|---|---|
| | 1 | (Spain) **Fernando Alonso*** | 246 |
| | 2 | (Australia) **Mark Webber*** | 238 |
| 1 | 3 | (Germany) **Sebastian Vettel*** | 231 |
| 1 | 4 | (United Kingdom) **Lewis Hamilton*** | 222 |
| | 5 | (United Kingdom) Jenson Button | 199 |

Constructors' Championship standings

| +/– | Pos | Constructor | Points |
|---|---|---|---|
| | 1 | (Austria) **Red Bull-Renault** | 469 |
| | 2 | (United Kingdom) McLaren-Mercedes | 421 |
| | 3 | (Italy) Ferrari | 389 |
| | 4 | (Germany) Mercedes | 202 |
| | 5 | (France) Renault | 145 |
Sources:

- Note: Only the top five positions are included for both sets of standings.
- **Bold text** indicates the 2010 World Constructors' Champions.
- **Bold text** and an asterisk indicates competitors who still had a theoretical chance of becoming World Champion.

== Footnotes ==
| Previous race: 2010 Korean Grand Prix | FIA Formula One World Championship; 2010 season | Next race: 2010 Abu Dhabi Grand Prix |
| Previous race: 2009 Brazilian Grand Prix | Brazilian Grand Prix | Next race: 2011 Brazilian Grand Prix |
