= 2010 Abu Dhabi Grand Prix =

Last round of the 2010 Formula One season

Race 19 of 19 in the 2010 Formula One World Championship
← Previous race	Next race →

Race details
- Date: 14 November 2010
- Official name: 2010 Formula 1 Etihad Airways Abu Dhabi Grand Prix
- Location: Yas Island, Abu Dhabi, United Arab Emirates
- Course: Yas Marina Circuit
- Course length: 5.554 km (3.451 miles)
- Distance: 55 laps, 305.355 km (189.747 miles)
- Weather: Dry Air Temp 28 °C (82 °F) Track Temp 33 °C (91 °F) dropping to 29 °C (84 °F)

Pole position
Driver	(Germany) Sebastian Vettel	Red Bull-Renault
- Time: 1:39.394

Fastest lap
Driver	(United Kingdom) Lewis Hamilton	McLaren-Mercedes
- Time: 1:41.274 on lap 47

Podium
First	(Germany) Sebastian Vettel	Red Bull-Renault
Second	(United Kingdom) Lewis Hamilton	McLaren-Mercedes
Third	(United Kingdom) Jenson Button	McLaren-Mercedes

The 2010 Abu Dhabi Grand Prix (formally the 2010 Formula 1 Etihad Airways Abu Dhabi Grand Prix) was a Formula One motor race held on 14 November 2010 at the Yas Marina Circuit on Yas Island, an island on the outskirts of Abu Dhabi in the United Arab Emirates. It was the nineteenth and final round of the 2010 Formula One season. The 55-lap race was won by Red Bull driver Sebastian Vettel after starting from pole position. Lewis Hamilton finished second in a McLaren, and teammate Jenson Button completed the podium, in third place.

A second race win in succession – as well as a second consecutive Abu Dhabi Grand Prix win – for Vettel, coupled with other championship contenders Hamilton, Fernando Alonso and Mark Webber finishing second, seventh and eighth respectively, allowed him to become the youngest World Drivers' Champion, at the age of 23 years, 134 days. Button's third place allowed him to finish fifth in the championship standings, having been eliminated from championship contention at the previous race in Brazil.

Due to injuries sustained in a rally crash prior to the 2011 Formula One season, this was the last Formula One race for Robert Kubica until the 2019 Australian Grand Prix. This was also the last Grand Prix for Lucas di Grassi and Christian Klien.

This event also notably marked the last race for Bridgestone as a tyre supplier in Formula One, since their full time debut in 1997. Pirelli became the sole tyre supplier for all teams in 2011, entering the sport for the first time since 1991.

== Report ==
=== Background ===
Heading into the final race of the season, Ferrari driver Fernando Alonso was leading the Drivers' Championship with 246 points; Red Bull drivers Mark Webber and Sebastian Vettel were second and third on 238 points and 231 points respectively. McLaren's Lewis Hamilton was technically also in contention on 222 points, 24 behind Alonso with a maximum of 25 points available for the final race. As a result, this was the first occasion that four drivers still had a chance of winning the Drivers' Championship at the final event of the season. In the Constructors' Championship, Red Bull Racing had already secured their first championship title with a total of 469 points, 48 clear of second-placed McLaren with a maximum of 43 points available. McLaren were themselves not confirmed in second place in the championship, with a 32-point advantage over Ferrari.

To interfere with the drivers was never a possibility for us. The whole world condemned Ferrari after what they did in Hockenheim, but we have turned out as idiots because we did not act in this way. We never even thought about it as long as both our drivers remain in the hunt for the championship. It is not assured that Alonso will always be the lucky one. Abu Dhabi will be incredibly exciting and provide highest tension. Sunday night we will know if we clinched the other 50 percent and have been successful or not. A second place under correct circumstances might be better than a win on grounds of orders and confirmations.

— Red Bull team owner Dietrich Mateschitz, on team orders.

Much of the media coverage occurring before the event was centred upon Red Bull, and the possibility of team orders being used to influence the result of the championship – if the team was in the position to do so – as had been used by Ferrari at the German Grand Prix. During that race, Ferrari had used radio transmissions to organize for Fernando Alonso to overtake teammate Felipe Massa for the race victory and gain seven extra points towards the Drivers' Championship. Team owner Dietrich Mateschitz and team principal Christian Horner both stated that Red Bull would not impose any team orders in order to benefit one of its drivers in a bid to stop Alonso from winning the championship. Sebastian Vettel himself had stated that he would help his teammate win the championship if required, having trailed Mark Webber by seven points heading into the weekend.

After 242 races since their full-time return in 1997, tyre supplier Bridgestone bowed out of Formula One, having been the sport's single tyre supplier since Michelin pulled out after the 2006 season. Pirelli took over the tyre contract in 2011, returning to Formula One for the first time since 1991.

==== Championship permutations ====
With Alonso being outscored by Vettel and Webber in the preceding Brazilian Grand Prix, the Drivers' Championship was decided in this race, marking the first time the final round of the season hosted the championship decider since 2008, and it was also the first time that four drivers were in contention for the Drivers' Championship at the season finale. Webber and Vettel both had an opportunity to win their first title at this event, and Red Bull's first ever Drivers' Championship since it purchased the former Jaguar F1 Team in 2005, while Hamilton and Alonso had the opportunity to win their second and third Drivers' title, respectively. If Alonso won the title, he would have been the youngest three-time World Champion aged 29 years and 108 days; if Hamilton won the title, he would have won his second title in three years and it would be the third consecutive title for a British driver after he himself and Jenson Button had won the championship in the previous two years. Furthermore, Webber and Vettel would have been the first World Drivers' Champions for their respective countries since Alan Jones and Michael Schumacher, while Vettel also had the chance of being the youngest ever World Champion, aged 23 years and 134 days. Reigning World Drivers' Champion Jenson Button was mathematically eliminated from championship contention as he was unable to overcome a 47-points-deficit heading into the final round of the season.

The championship would have been won by either of the top four drivers in the following manners:

	Alonso would have won if:			
	(Spain) Fernando Alonso	(Australia) Mark Webber	(Germany) Sebastian Vettel	(United Kingdom) Lewis Hamilton
Pos.	2nd or better	Eliminated	Eliminated	Eliminated
Pos.	3rd or 4th	2nd or lower	Eliminated	Eliminated
Pos.	5th or 6th	3rd or lower	2nd or lower	Eliminated
Pos.	7th or 8th	4th or lower	2nd or lower	Eliminated
Pos.	9th	5th or lower	3rd or lower	Eliminated
Pos.	10th or lower	6th or lower	3rd or lower	2nd or lower

	Webber would have won if:			
	(Australia) Mark Webber	(Spain) Fernando Alonso	(Germany) Sebastian Vettel	(United Kingdom) Lewis Hamilton
Pos.	1st	3rd or lower	Eliminated	Eliminated
Pos.	2nd	6th or lower	2nd or lower	Eliminated
Pos.	3rd	7th or lower	2nd or lower	Eliminated
Pos.	4th	9th or lower	2nd or lower	Eliminated
Pos.	5th	9th or lower	3rd or lower	Eliminated

	Vettel would have won if:			
	(Germany) Sebastian Vettel	(Spain) Fernando Alonso	(Australia) Mark Webber	(United Kingdom) Lewis Hamilton
Pos.	1st	5th or lower	Eliminated	Eliminated
Pos.	2nd	9th or lower	5th or lower	Eliminated
Pos.	3rd	lower than 10th	6th or lower	2nd or lower

	Hamilton would have won if:			
	(United Kingdom) Lewis Hamilton	(Spain) Fernando Alonso	(Australia) Mark Webber	(Germany) Sebastian Vettel
Pos.	1st	lower than 10th	6th or lower	3rd or lower

=== Practice and qualifying ===
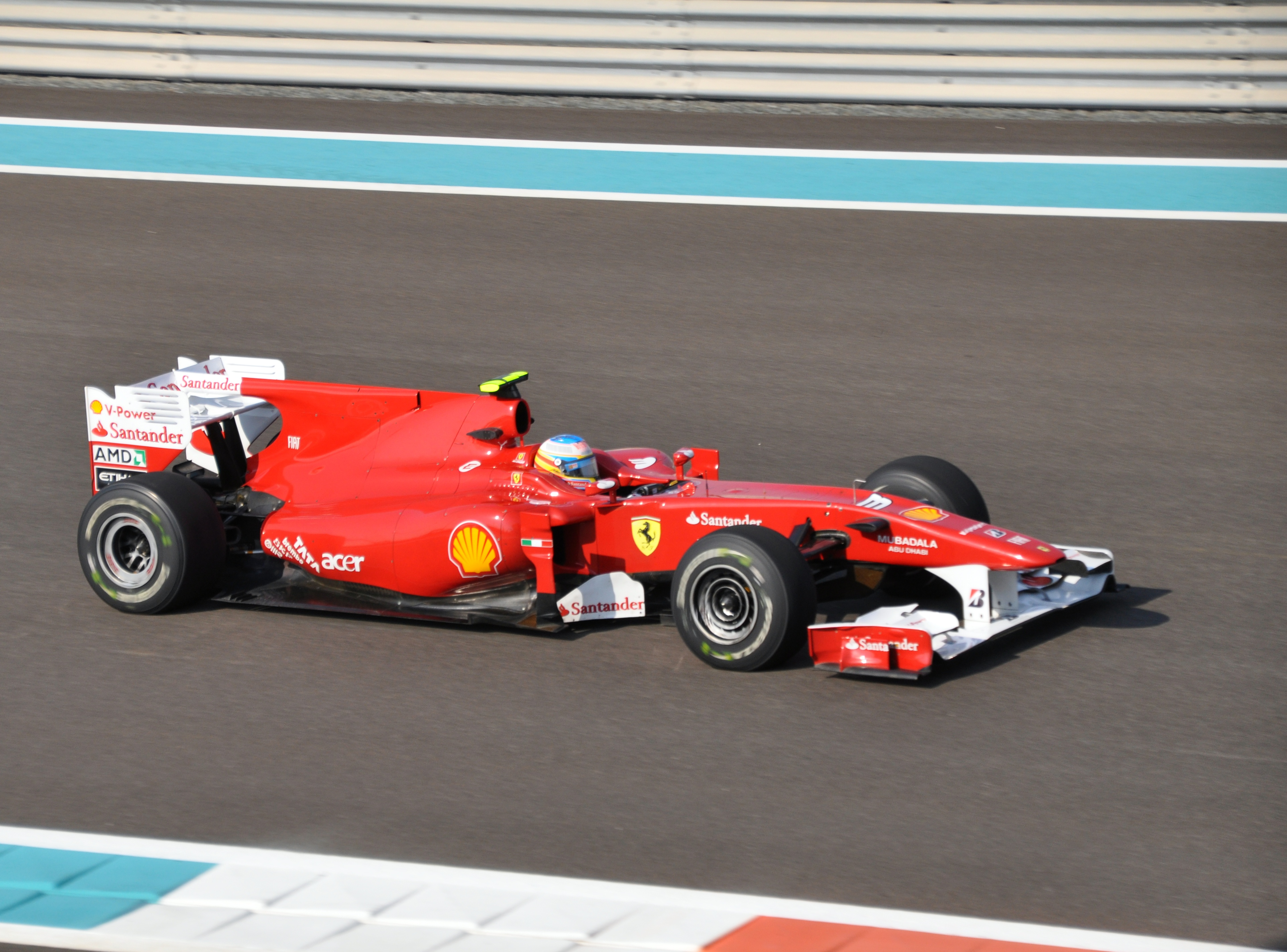
Fernando Alonso only required a top-two placing to win the title without having to rely on other results. He placed in the top six in each of the three free practice sessions, and qualified third for the race.

Three practice sessions were held before the race; the first on Friday afternoon and the second on Friday evening. Both sessions lasted 90 minutes. The third session was held on Saturday afternoon and lasted an hour. All three sessions were held in dry conditions, although the first session was held on a damp but drying track after a pre-session downpour which had not been anticipated. Vettel was quickest with a time of 1:42.760 in the first session, just over six-tenths of a second faster than Hamilton. Button was another four-tenths off Hamilton's pace, followed by Webber, Robert Kubica, and Alonso. Michael Schumacher was seventh, the only other driver to be within 1.5 seconds of Vettel's time. In the second practice session, Hamilton was fastest with a time of 1:40.888, around a quarter of a second quicker than second-placed Vettel. Alonso took third place, ahead of Webber, Kubica and Felipe Massa. Schumacher was only quick enough for eleventh position in the session, marginally slower than his Mercedes teammate Nico Rosberg. The Saturday afternoon session was held on a much warmer track, which reached temperatures as high as 43 °C (109 °F), compared with 29 °C (84 °F) and 31 °C (88 °F) track temperatures for the Friday sessions. Vettel was again quickest, posting a time of 1:40.696, narrowly faster than teammate Webber. Hamilton, Alonso, Button and Vitaly Petrov rounded out the top six positions.

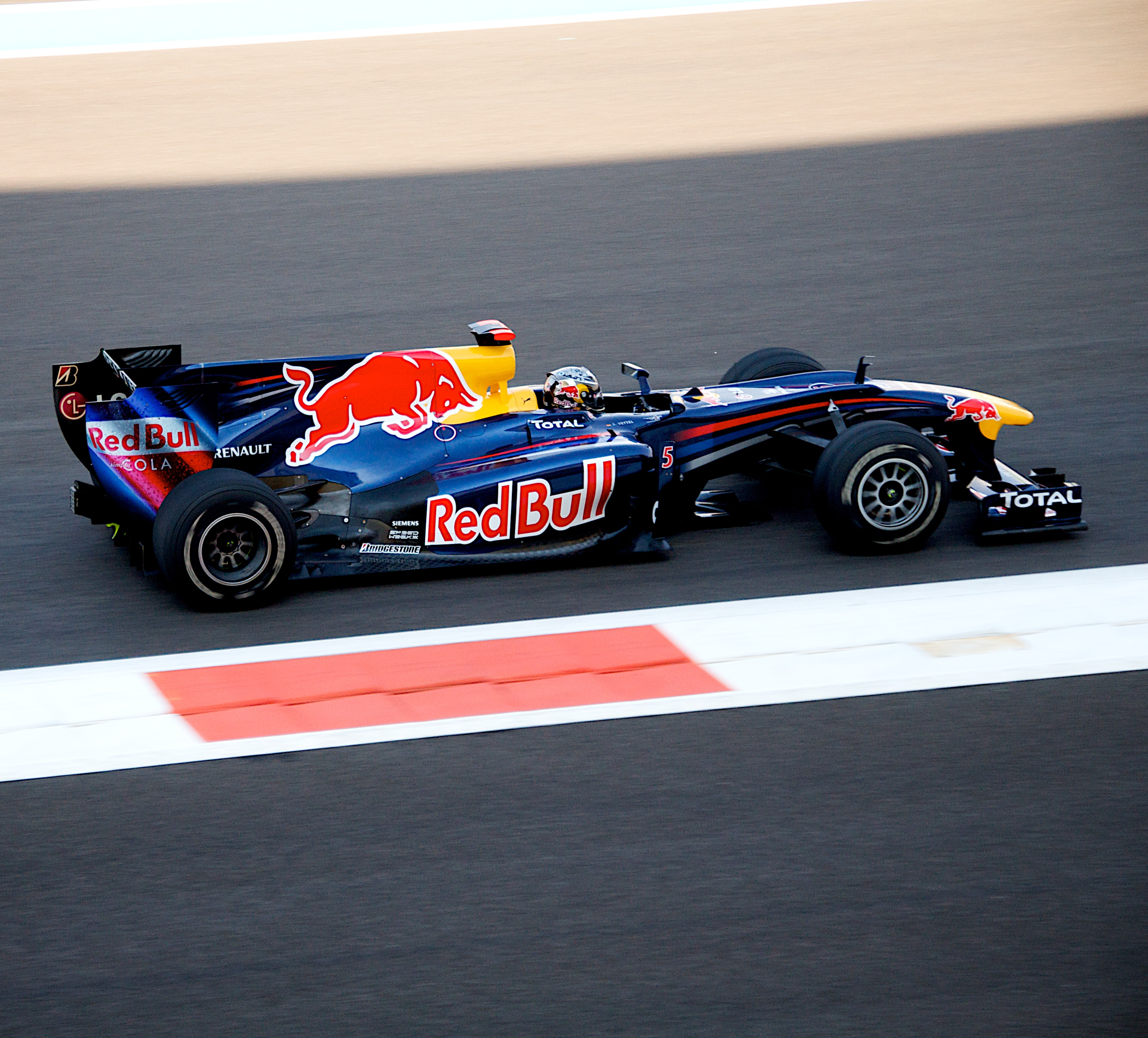
Sebastian Vettel set the fastest time in the last two parts of the qualifying session, and started from pole position. His tenth pole position of the season enabled his Red Bull team to tie McLaren's single-season record of 15 pole positions, set during the 1988 season.

The qualifying session held on Saturday evening was split into three parts. The first part ran for 20 minutes and eliminated the cars from qualifying that finished the session 18th or lower. The second part of qualifying lasted 15 minutes and eliminated cars that finished in positions 11 to 17. The final part of qualifying determined the positions from first to tenth, and decided pole position. Cars which competed in the final session of qualifying were not allowed to change tyres before the race, and as such started the race on the tyres that they set their quickest lap on.

I'm not rapt to be fifth on the grid, it's disappointing, but there's still a long way to go tomorrow – the fat lady hasn't sung yet. I would like to have been further up, but I couldn't get the pace. We need to be there at the end of tomorrow's race and a lot can still happen; I haven't helped things today, but the championship's not decided today. I didn't seem to have the grip the other guys had and I need to have a look where I was losing time. We will just have to do the best job we can tomorrow, it's a long race – we're still in the hunt and that's the main thing.

— Mark Webber, following the third qualifying session, in which he qualified the farthest back of the four title contenders, in fifth.

Vettel clinched his tenth pole position for the season, with a time of 1:39.394. As a result, Vettel became only the seventh driver to record ten pole positions in a season, and took his team's 15th pole of the season, equalling McLaren's tally from the 1988 season. He was joined on the front row of the grid by Hamilton. Alonso qualified third, though he was happy with his grid position having outqualified Webber. Button qualified fourth, four-tenths of a second behind Vettel, and Webber qualified fifth. Massa, Rubens Barrichello, Schumacher, Rosberg and Petrov rounded out the top ten. Kubica only managed 11th – missing out on the top ten for the only time in 2010 – having struggled with overall grip in the session. Kamui Kobayashi was best of the Saubers in 12th, ahead of the German trio of Adrian Sutil, Nick Heidfeld and Nico Hülkenberg, with Vitantonio Liuzzi qualifying 16th. The rest of the grid was made up by the Toro Rossos, the Lotuses, the Virgins and the Hispanias.

=== Race ===
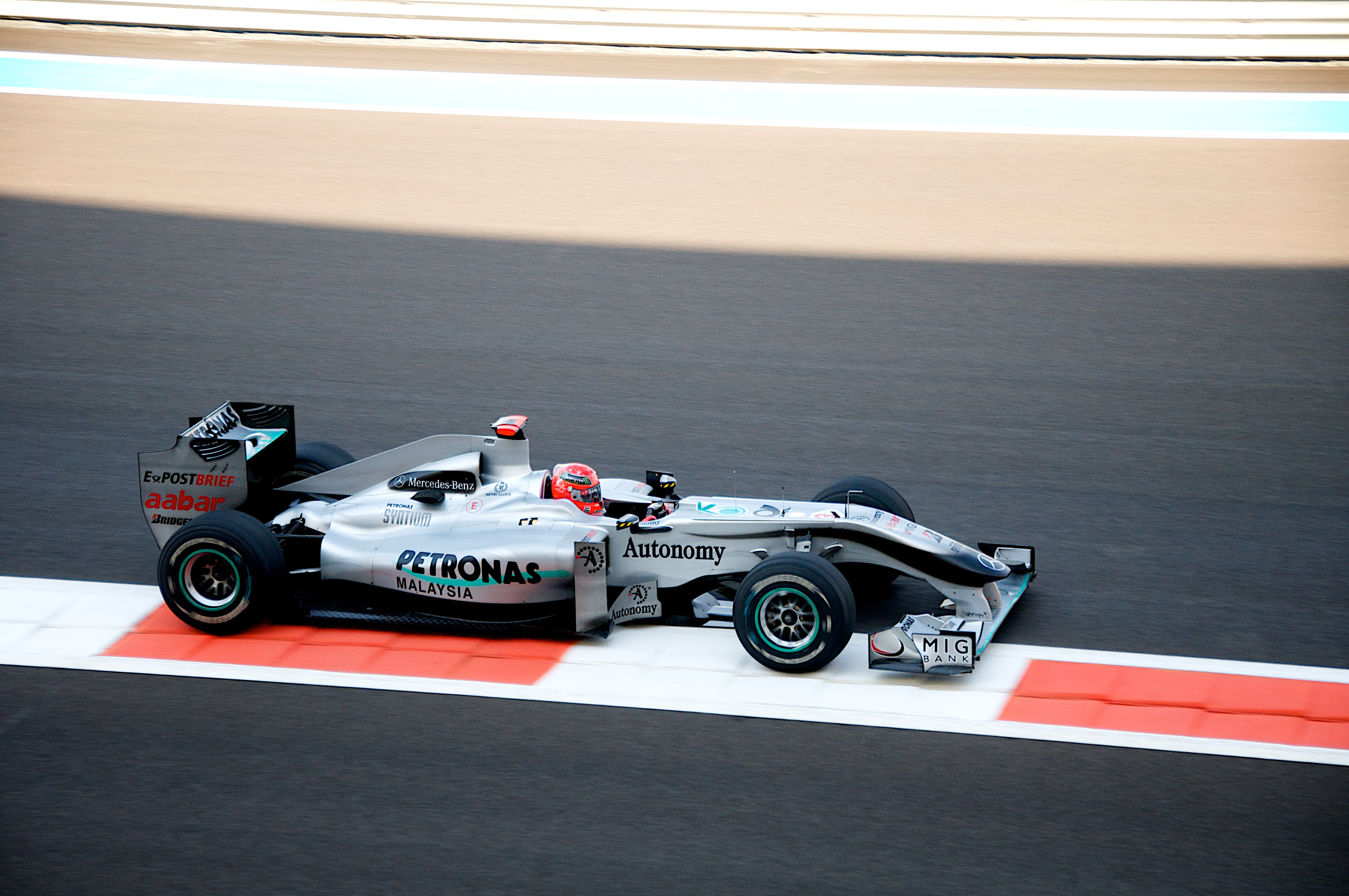
Michael Schumacher's spin and resultant collision with Vitantonio Liuzzi brought out the safety car on the first lap.

The conditions on the grid were dry before the race, the air temperature at 29 °C (84 °F), track temperature at 33 °C (91 °F); and no rain expected. The race's formation lap commenced at 17:00 local time (UTC+4), with all 24 drivers getting away cleanly. Vettel retained his pole position lead into the first corner, followed by Hamilton, with Button moving into third after Alonso made a slow start. At turn six, Schumacher tried to pass teammate Rosberg around the outside while battling for eighth. The seven-time world champion spun his Mercedes, which meant he faced the rest of the oncoming field on track and was collected by Liuzzi, causing both drivers to retire on the spot and the safety car to be deployed. In order to aid any losses that a pit stop may have cost under normal racing conditions, six drivers – Rosberg, Petrov, Jaime Alguersuari, Bruno Senna, Lucas di Grassi and Christian Klien – made pit stops at the end of lap one, and rejoined the circuit between 17th and 22nd. Racing resumed at the end of lap five when the safety car pulled into the pit-lane. The top five remained static until the end of lap eleven.

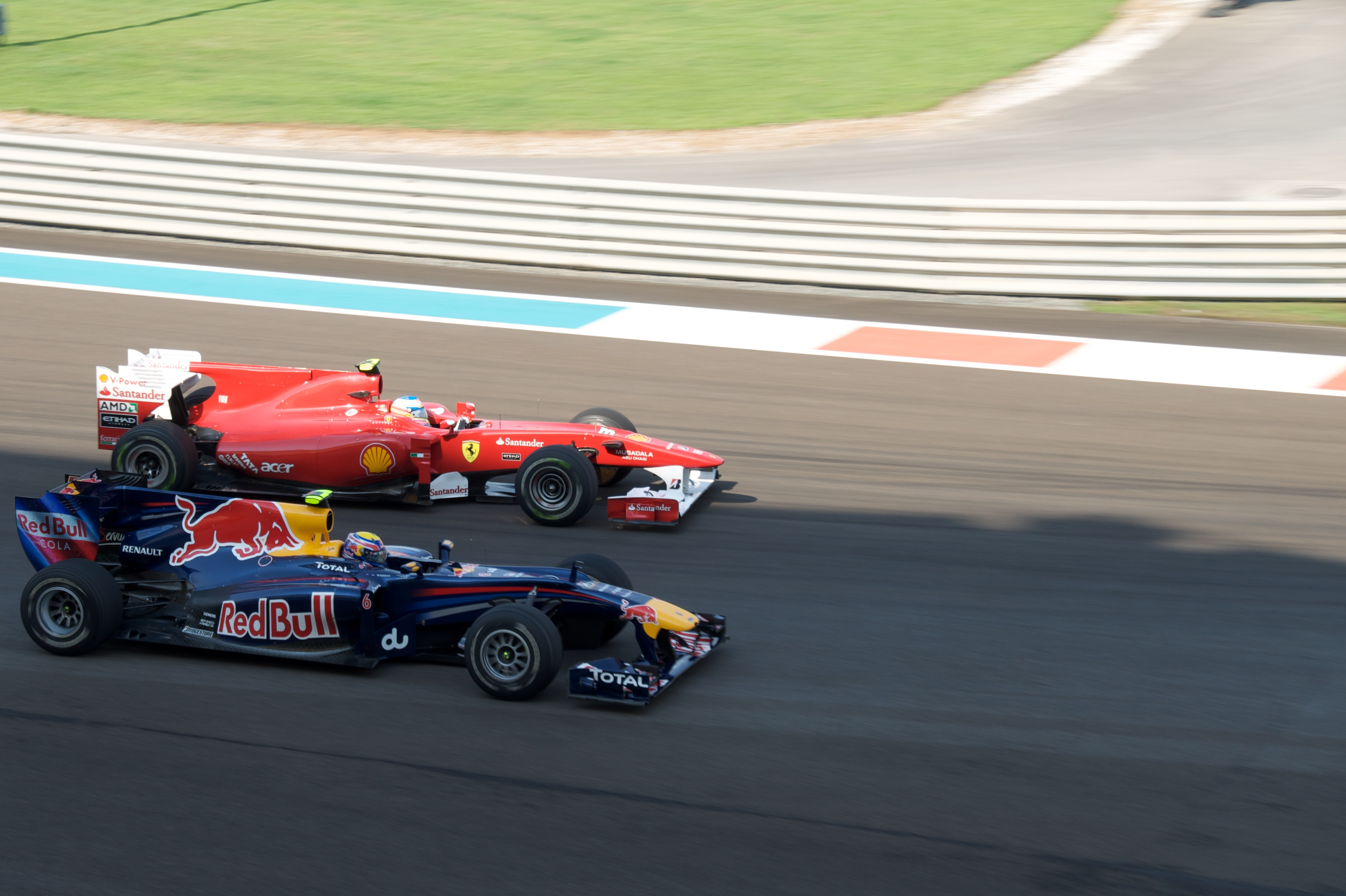
Early pit-stops by Mark Webber and Fernando Alonso did not help their championship chances, as progress up the order was slower than expected.

Webber – who brushed the armco with the right-hand side of his car three laps previously – pitted after struggling for grip on the super-soft, option tyres. He rejoined the circuit 16th, and behind the early-stopping trio of Rosberg, Petrov and Alguersuari. Four laps later, Alonso also brushed the Turn 19 barrier before pitting. He rejoined just in front of Webber, who had moved up the field steadily, and was running 13th – and set the race's fastest lap at the time – by the time Alonso pitted. Vettel and Hamilton continued to set quicker lap times than their championship rivals, despite being on heavily worn option tyres compared to the fresher, hard tyres of Alonso and Webber. That pairing caught up with Petrov towards the end of lap 18, a battle that would go on until the race's conclusion, with the Renault driver having already stopped for tyres. Five laps later, Alonso tried to overtake Petrov under braking for Turn 11 but had to back out of the manoeuvre, narrowly avoiding the back of the Renault. On the same lap, Hamilton pitted from second place. Vettel pitted from the lead on the next lap, and rejoined the circuit comfortably ahead of Hamilton, but in second place behind Button, who had still to stop on track. Hamilton had filtered back into the race in fifth position, behind Kubica and Kobayashi who were running similar strategies to Button out front. After passing Kobayashi, Hamilton closed in behind Kubica but found it hard to pass the Renault, akin to what Alonso had been suffering behind Petrov. Despite having nearly 40 laps on the harder tyre, Kubica's pace was still of a substantial level to hold off the advances of Hamilton.

Button pitted on lap 39 to release Vettel back into the lead, holding a lead of nearly twelve seconds over Kubica. Button rejoined in fourth place behind Kubica and Hamilton, with Kubica ever increasing his margin over Petrov and Alonso, who were running inside the points again in seventh and eighth respectively. Kubica finally pitted on lap 46 from second place, and came back on track in fifth place, crucially ahead of teammate Petrov, Alonso and Webber; the latter pair seeing their championship chances dwindling with every passing lap. In clean air, Hamilton set the race's fastest lap on lap 47 – 1:41.274 – as he closed slightly on Vettel. No further passing attempts were made on track, and thus, Vettel led the race to the end, to take his fifth win of the season. The McLarens of Hamilton and Button completed the podium ahead of Rosberg, the Renaults of Kubica and Petrov, Alonso and Webber. Rounding out the points were Alguersuari and Massa, the Ferrari driver having never got ahead of his rival in 40 laps of battling. With the poor results of Alonso and Webber, Vettel claimed the championship to become the youngest Championship winner in the sport, a feat that would later be surpassed by Kimi Antonelli in 2026. Vettel also became the first driver to simultaneously lead the championship for the first time, and as a result win the championship since James Hunt in 1976. His championship-winning margin was four points over Alonso; whom he would go ahead and replace in future at Ferrari, with Webber a further ten points behind in third.

=== Post-race ===
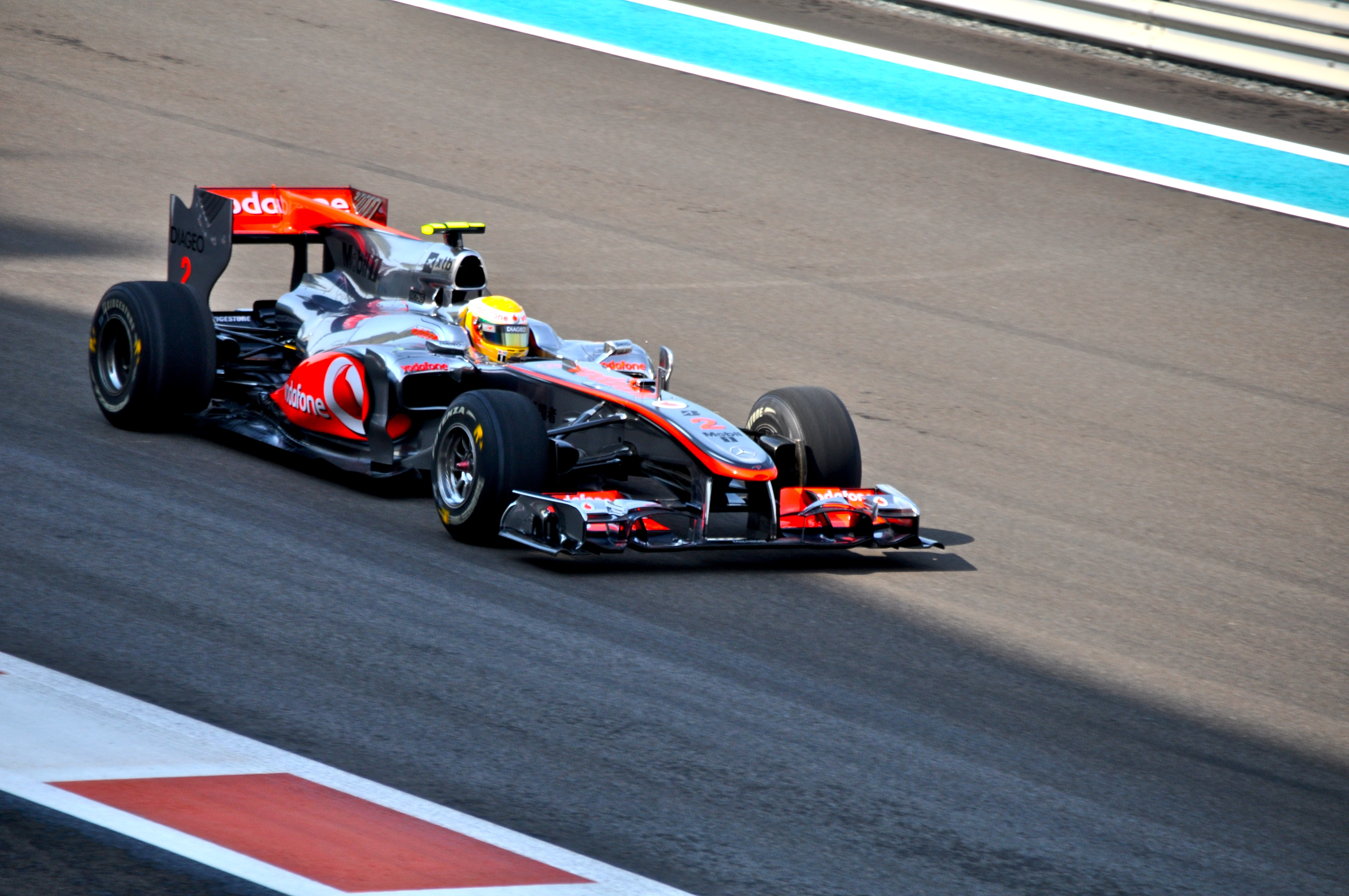
Lewis Hamilton's record for being the youngest Championship winner in 2008 was broken by Sebastian Vettel. At 23 years, 134 days, Vettel broke Hamilton's record by 166 days.

After the race it is always very easy to see the best strategy. As I said now you need to cover from someone and if we didn't stop I think Webber probably would have overtaken us, if we stopped we cover from Webber but let Petrov and Rosberg in front so it was a very difficult call I think. It was obviously a tough difficult race. I lost a position at the start and then when the first safety car came out Petrov and Rosberg came in so... We saw some problems with the soft tyres, Webber pitted and then we tried to cover from him. When you cover someone probably you give something away to the others. So it was then a choice between covering Vettel or Petrov and Rosberg, so we covered Webber and then it was difficult to overtake Petrov. The Renault is very quick on the top speed so it was a frustrating race behind him. But this is a sport, this is motor racing. Sometimes you win, sometimes you lose.

— Championship runner-up Fernando Alonso, summing up his race and his chances of his third championship disappearing.

The top three finishers appeared on the podium and in the subsequent press conference. Vettel's victory had left him "speechless", and expressed his delight at winning the Championship. He also stated:

To be honest I didn't know anything until I crossed the chequered flag. The last 10 laps I was wondering as my race engineer every lap was trying to give some advice and trying to help me carry the car home. I was thinking why is this guy nervous, we must be in a bloody good position. Then crossing the line he came on the radio very silently and said 'it is looking good, but we have to wait until the cars finish'. I was thinking 'what does he mean' and I hadn't seen the screens. I just wanted to make sure, not get any distraction, just focus on myself. Then he came on the radio and screams at me that we have won the World Championship.

Hamilton praised his team for all their work during the season, stating that "we pushed very hard throughout the year, so a big thank to all the guys back home at the factory for not giving up. Next year will be a better year." Button echoed Hamilton's comments about the work of his McLaren team, and summed up his first season with the team: "I would like to say a big thank you to the team. This is my first year with the team and I have had a great season. I really feel at home and I think the experiences we have gained this year, Lewis and myself, with working closely with the engineers and everyone in the Vodafone McLaren Mercedes team means we can really build on this season for next year."

== Classification ==
=== Qualifying ===
Pos	No	Driver	Constructor	Q1	Q2	Q3	Grid
1	5	(Germany) Sebastian Vettel	Red Bull-Renault	1:40.318	1:39.874	1:39.394	1
2	2	(United Kingdom) Lewis Hamilton	McLaren-Mercedes	1:40.335	1:40.119	1:39.425	2
3	8	(Spain) Fernando Alonso	Ferrari	1:40.170	1:40.311	1:39.792	3
4	1	(United Kingdom) Jenson Button	McLaren-Mercedes	1:40.877	1:40.014	1:39.823	4
5	6	(Australia) Mark Webber	Red Bull-Renault	1:40.690	1:40.074	1:39.925	5
6	7	(Brazil) Felipe Massa	Ferrari	1:40.942	1:40.323	1:40.202	6
7	9	(Brazil) Rubens Barrichello	Williams-Cosworth	1:40.904	1:40.476	1:40.203	7
8	3	(Germany) Michael Schumacher	Mercedes	1:41.222	1:40.452	1:40.516	8
9	4	(Germany) Nico Rosberg	Mercedes	1:40.231	1:40.060	1:40.589	9
10	12	(Russia) Vitaly Petrov	Renault	1:41.018	1:40.658	1:40.901	10
11	11	(Poland) Robert Kubica	Renault	1:41.336	1:40.780		11
12	23	(Japan) Kamui Kobayashi	BMW Sauber-Ferrari	1:41.045	1:40.783		12
13	14	(Germany) Adrian Sutil	Force India-Mercedes	1:41.473	1:40.914		13
14	22	(Germany) Nick Heidfeld	BMW Sauber-Ferrari	1:41.409	1:41.113		14
15	10	(Germany) Nico Hülkenberg	Williams-Cosworth	1:41.015	1:41.418		15
16	15	(Italy) Vitantonio Liuzzi	Force India-Mercedes	1:41.681	1:41.642		16
17	17	(Spain) Jaime Alguersuari	Toro Rosso-Ferrari	1:41.707	1:41.738		17
18	16	(Switzerland) Sébastien Buemi	Toro Rosso-Ferrari	1:41.824			18
19	18	(Italy) Jarno Trulli	Lotus-Cosworth	1:43.516			19
20	19	(Finland) Heikki Kovalainen	Lotus-Cosworth	1:43.712			20
21	24	(Germany) Timo Glock	Virgin-Cosworth	1:44.095			21
22	25	(Brazil) Lucas di Grassi	Virgin-Cosworth	1:44.510			22
23	21	(Brazil) Bruno Senna	HRT-Cosworth	1:45.085			23
24	20	(Austria) Christian Klien	HRT-Cosworth	1:45.296			24

=== Race classification ===
Pos.	No.	Driver	Constructor	Laps	Time/Retired	Grid	Points
1	5	(Germany) Sebastian Vettel	Red Bull-Renault	55	1:39:36.837	1	25
2	2	(United Kingdom) Lewis Hamilton	McLaren-Mercedes	55	+10.162	2	18
3	1	(United Kingdom) Jenson Button	McLaren-Mercedes	55	+11.047	4	15
4	4	(Germany) Nico Rosberg	Mercedes	55	+30.747	9	12
5	11	(Poland) Robert Kubica	Renault	55	+39.026	11	10
6	12	(Russia) Vitaly Petrov	Renault	55	+43.520	10	8
7	8	(Spain) Fernando Alonso	Ferrari	55	+43.797	3	6
8	6	(Australia) Mark Webber	Red Bull-Renault	55	+44.243	5	4
9	17	(Spain) Jaime Alguersuari	Toro Rosso-Ferrari	55	+50.201	17	2
10	7	(Brazil) Felipe Massa	Ferrari	55	+50.868	6	1
11	22	(Germany) Nick Heidfeld	BMW Sauber-Ferrari	55	+51.551	14	
12	9	(Brazil) Rubens Barrichello	Williams-Cosworth	55	+57.686	7	
13	14	(Germany) Adrian Sutil	Force India-Mercedes	55	+58.325	13	
14	23	(Japan) Kamui Kobayashi	BMW Sauber-Ferrari	55	+59.558	12	
15	16	(Switzerland) Sébastien Buemi	Toro Rosso-Ferrari	55	+1:03.178	18	
16	10	(Germany) Nico Hülkenberg	Williams-Cosworth	55	+1:04.763	15	
17	19	(Finland) Heikki Kovalainen	Lotus-Cosworth	54	+1 Lap	20	
18	25	(Brazil) Lucas di Grassi	Virgin-Cosworth	53	+2 Laps	22	
19	21	(Brazil) Bruno Senna	HRT-Cosworth	53	+2 Laps	23	
20	20	(Austria) Christian Klien	HRT-Cosworth	53	+2 Laps	24	
21^{1}	18	(Italy) Jarno Trulli	Lotus-Cosworth	51	Rear Wing	19	
Ret	24	(Germany) Timo Glock	Virgin-Cosworth	43	Gearbox	21	
Ret	3	(Germany) Michael Schumacher	Mercedes	0	Collision	8	
Ret	15	(Italy) Vitantonio Liuzzi	Force India-Mercedes	0	Collision	16	

- ^1 – Jarno Trulli retired from the race, but was classified as he completed more than 90% of the race distance.

== Final Championship standings ==
Drivers' Championship standings

	Pos.	Driver	Points
2	1	(Germany) **Sebastian Vettel**	256
1	2	(Spain) Fernando Alonso	252
1	3	(Australia) Mark Webber	242
	4	(United Kingdom) Lewis Hamilton	240
	5	(United Kingdom) Jenson Button	214

Constructors' Championship standings

Pos.	Constructor	Points
1	(Austria) **Red Bull-Renault**	498
2	(United Kingdom) McLaren-Mercedes	454
3	(Italy) Ferrari	396
4	(Germany) Mercedes	214
5	(France) Renault	163

- Note: Only the top five positions are included for both sets of standings.
- **Bold text** indicates the 2010 World Champions.

== See also ==
- 2010 Yas Marina GP2 Series round

Previous race: 2010 Brazilian Grand Prix	FIA Formula One World Championship; 2010 season	Next race: 2011 Australian Grand Prix; 2011 Bahrain Grand Prix cancelled
Previous race: 2009 Abu Dhabi Grand Prix	Abu Dhabi Grand Prix	Next race: 2011 Abu Dhabi Grand Prix
