= 2010 Korean Grand Prix =

Race 17 of 19 in the 2010 Formula One World Championship
← Previous race	Next race →

Race details
- Date: 24 October 2010
- Official name: 2010 Formula 1 Korean Grand Prix
- Location: Yeongam, South Jeolla, South Korea
- Course: Korea International Circuit
- Course length: 5.615 km (3.489 miles)
- Distance: 55 laps, 308.630 km (191.774 (Note: There was an 0.195 km (0.121 mi) offset between the start and finish lines.) miles)
- Weather: Rain. Air 20 °C (68 °F), Track 18 °C (64 °F)
- Attendance: 80,000

Pole position
Driver	(Germany) Sebastian Vettel	Red Bull-Renault
- Time: 1:35.585

Fastest lap
Driver	(Spain) Fernando Alonso	Ferrari
- Time: 1:50.257 on lap 42

Podium
First	(Spain) Fernando Alonso	Ferrari
Second	(United Kingdom) Lewis Hamilton	McLaren-Mercedes
Third	(Brazil) Felipe Massa	Ferrari

The 2010 Korean Grand Prix (formally the 2010 Formula 1 Korean Grand Prix) was a Formula One motor race held on 24 October 2010 at the Korea International Circuit in Yeongam, South Jeolla, South Korea. It was the 17th round of the 2010 Formula One World Championship and the first Korean Grand Prix. Ferrari driver Fernando Alonso won the 55-lap race starting from third position. McLaren's Lewis Hamilton finished second and Alonso's teammate Felipe Massa was third.

Mark Webber led the World Drivers' Championship and his team Red Bull led the World Constructors' Championship going into the event. The race began behind the safety car but was stopped after three laps because of a large amount of standing water on the circuit. After a 45-minute delay, the race was restarted and the safety car was withdrawn after 13 laps. Pole sitter Sebastian Vettel maintained his lead going into the first corner. A second safety car deployment caused by the collision of Mark Webber and Nico Rosberg on lap 19 closed up the field but Vettel retained the lead. Alonso maintained second position until a botched pit stop during a third safety-car period caused him to drop to third. At the restart on lap 35, Hamilton ran wide at the first corner, allowing Alonso back into second place. Vettel's engine failed 11 laps later, promoting Alonso to the lead, which he maintained to win the race.

Alonso's fifth victory of the season elevated him to the lead of the World Drivers' Championship, 11 championship points ahead of Webber, who had dropped to second after failing to finish the race because of an accident. Hamilton moved into third and Vettel's retirement demoted him to fourth. Button remained in fifth position, trailing Alonso by 42 championship points. In the World Constructors' Championship, McLaren reduced the points deficit to Red Bull to 27 championship points. With two races of the season remaining, Ferrari was a further 25 championship points behind.

== Background ==
The 2010 Korean Grand Prix was the 17th of the 19th rounds in the 2010 Formula One World Championship and was held at the 5.615 km (3.489 mi) anti-clockwise Korea International Circuit on 24 October 2010. The Grand Prix was contested by twelve teams with two drivers each. The teams (also known as constructors) were Red Bull, Mercedes, McLaren, Ferrari, Renault, Williams, Force India, Sauber, Toro Rosso, Lotus, Hispania and Virgin. Tyre supplier Bridgestone provided four types of tyres to the race; two dry compounds (soft green-striped "options" and hard "primes") and wet-weather green-lined compounds (intermediate and full wet).

Before the race, Red Bull driver Mark Webber led the World Drivers' Championship with 220 championship points; he was ahead of Fernando Alonso and Sebastian Vettel, who were tied for second place on 206 championship points. Lewis Hamilton was in fourth with 192 championship points and Hamilton's teammate Jenson Button was fifth on 189 championship points. There were 75 championship points available for the three remaining races, which meant Hamilton or Button could still win the title. Both drivers would mathematically stay in contention if Alonso or Vettel won the race and neither McLaren driver finished in a points-scoring position. Red Bull led the World Constructors' Championship with 426 championship points; McLaren and Ferrari were second and third with 381 and 334 championship points respectively, while Mercedes on 176 championship points and Renault on 133 contended for fourth place. Red Bull, McLaren and Ferrari had so far won races in the previous 16 rounds of the season. Felipe Massa (twice) and Robert Kubica had finished in second place, and Nico Rosberg, Massa (twice), Kubica (once) had all finished in third.

With three races remaining in the Championship and a 14-point advantage, Webber said he would continue his pursuit of the title; "I need to keep racing hard and going for victories. Clearly, if my rivals have a rough weekend it makes it a bit harder for them and it gives me a bit more scope, but I'm not looking to abuse that because it can all go pear-shaped very fast." Vettel said his season had been fraught with car problems but he remained positive about his chances; "I think it's normal to have ups and downs – and sometimes you have more, sometimes less – but, as I said, the expectation was probably to be in a position to fight for the championship and I think we're in a very strong and very good position." Alonso urged his teammate Massa to help him in his title bid and said the Korean Grand Prix could become "decisive" for his championship rivals. He favoured Hamilton to win the Korean Grand Prix. With Hamilton 28 championship points behind Webber and with Button a further three championship points behind his teammate, McLaren's team principal Martin Whitmarsh said his drivers would keep their focus in the season's remaining three races and produce consistent performances. Karun Chandhok, who raced for Hispania in the first ten races of the season, said Red Bull were the favourites to win, and that he thought the circuit's three long straights would suit the McLaren cars.

Following increased hostilities between North Korea and South Korea in the wake of the sinking of the South Korean corvette Cheonan in March 2010, Formula One Group chief executive Bernie Ecclestone said the race would be in jeopardy if political tensions continued to escalate, and it would be abandoned if the North Korean army crossed the border. The revival of the French Grand Prix at the Circuit de Nevers Magny-Cours was mooted as an alternative if the Korean Grand Prix was cancelled. Although hostilities between the two nations eventually relaxed, the race was further threatened by delayed construction due to 38 days of rain in the summer. On 27 September 2010, Ecclestone said he doubted the circuit would be ready despite the laying of tarmac. A final inspection of the circuit took place on 11 October; Fédération Internationale de l'Automobile (FIA) safety delegate Charlie Whiting certified that the circuit was ready on 12 October. The top layer of the track was completed ten days before the race; there was not enough time for the elements to remove the oils and bitumen chemicals in the tarmac. Circuit designer Hermann Tilke said the surface would be slippery, making the race challenging for drivers and exciting for fans.

The layout of the track received a mostly positive response from the drivers. Adrian Sutil of Force India said he felt it was a "real pleasure" to be racing on the track and praised it for having "a lot of character". Mercedes driver Michael Schumacher said the asphalt improved during the Friday free practice sessions and that the track was "very demanding and tricky which provides a challenge that I like a lot". Kubica said although the first sector was "boring" he felt the entire track layout was "ten times better than Abu Dhabi". The drivers raised concerns about the entry of the pit lane at turn 17—a corner taken at 240 km/h (150 mph). Kubica said, "It might be quite tight if someone's pitting" and Lotus driver Jarno Trulli said he was "worried about someone going into the back of him" when he was forced to pit because his car's gears were stuck in position. He also said the drivers would raise the point with Whiting.

Some teams modified their cars in preparation for the event. Red Bull and Williams revised their brake ducts. Williams team changed their brake ducts at the front to improve airflow inside the tyres and direct the duct towards their car's central section more efficiently. Red Bull's brake ducts, which had been changed for the third consecutive Grand Prix, reintroduced a small fin seen at the Singapore Grand Prix; for Korea two aerodynamic fins were fitted and a larger duct was introduced. McLaren modified a version of their front wings first introduced in Singapore. The team added a vertical gurney flap and an additional vertical slot at the front wing endplate to improve airflow outside the front tyres and increase the amount of downforce and therefore grip produced by the bodywork. The team also brought a new rear wing and tested a new revision of their F-duct system that débuted at the Japanese Grand Prix in Suzuka. Ferrari revised their diffuser with curved profiles and one large middle plate designed to improve the extraction of air from the bottom of the F10. As in Suzuka, Toro Rosso ran an F-duct system in the Friday practice sessions.

== Practice ==
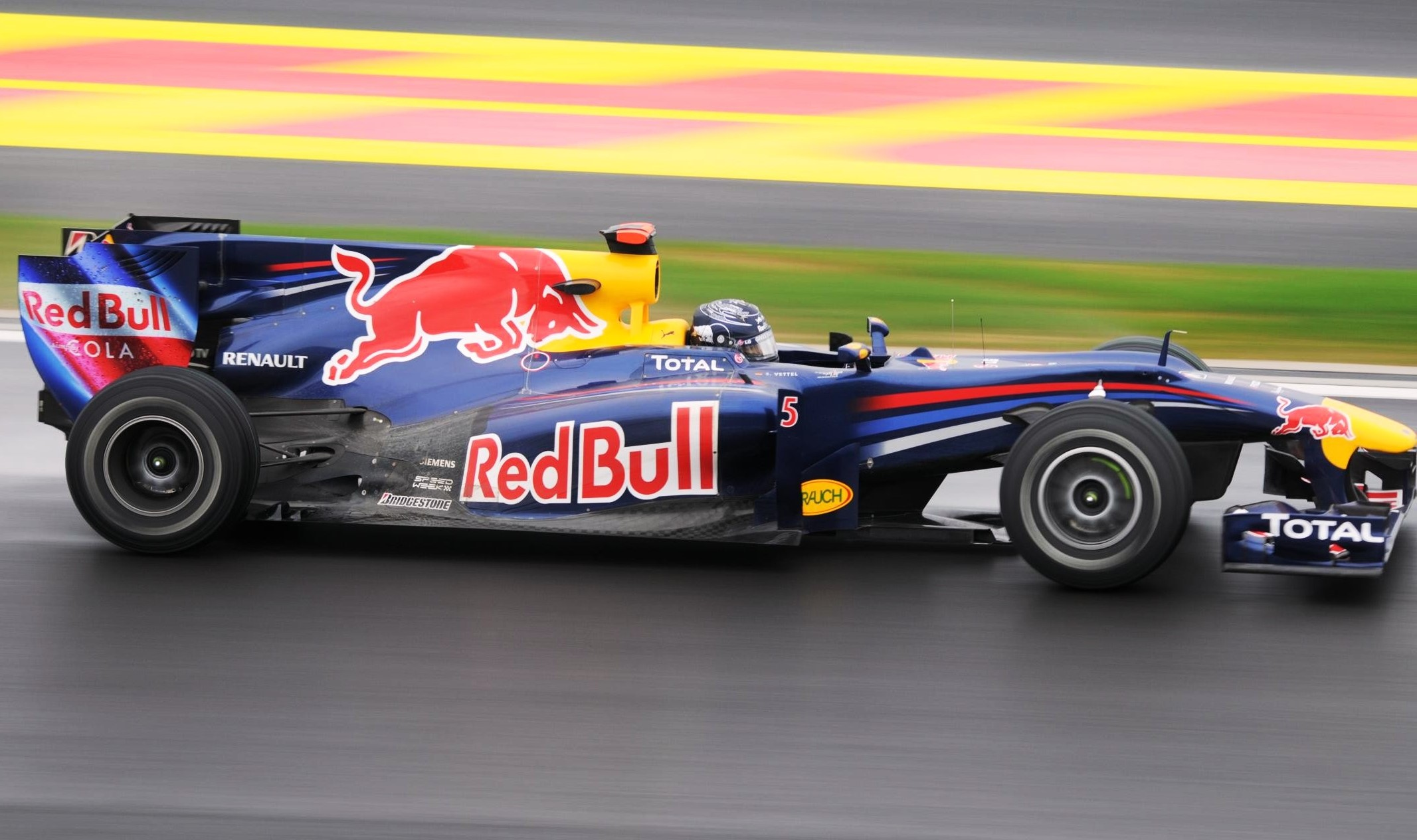
Sebastian Vettel secured his ninth pole position of the season.

Per the regulations for the 2010 season, three practice sessions were held, two 90-minute sessions on Friday morning and afternoon and another 60-minute session on Saturday morning. The track was dusty when the first practice sessions were held; grip was poor and some drivers went onto the run-off areas after going off the track. Hamilton paced the first practice session with a 1:40.887 lap; almost one-tenth of a second quicker than Kubica. Rosberg and Michael Schumacher set the third- and sixth-fastest times respectively for Mercedes; they were separated by Vettel and Button. Webber, Nick Heidfeld and the two Williams drivers completed the top ten; Nico Hülkenberg ahead of Rubens Barrichello. Hispania driver Bruno Senna spun at turn nine after his left rear suspension failed and stopped on the track without hitting a barrier. Grip was improved for the second practice session, in which Webber set a time of 1:37.942—the quickest of the day—despite spinning late in the session. Alonso was second-quickest and Hamilton third. Kubica set the fourth-quickest time. Button, who was sidelined for most of the session with an overheated exhaust, was fifth. Massa, Vettel, Vitaly Petrov, Rosberg and Kamui Kobayashi made up positions six to ten. Sakon Yamamoto in the other Hispania car caused the session to be suspended after spinning and stopping his car at turn 16.

After discussions with Whiting during a Friday night drivers' briefing, the height of an apex at turn 16 was increased and the wall in the area was moved back. A new apex kerb at turn 18 was built to stop dirt and stones from accumulating on the circuit, which was extensively cleaned. Drivers were told they could enter the pit lane from the racing line without incurring a penalty. Bridgestone had reported heavy tyre graining during the Friday practice sessions; its Motorsport Tyre Development director Hirohide Hamashima said drivers would face a challenge of looking after their tyres if track conditions had not changed before the race. Kubica was quickest in the final practice session; his late lap of 1:37.354 was 0.048 seconds quicker than Hamilton's in second. Alonso and Webber were third and fourth. Rosberg, who was fifth, slowed at turn 15 during the session's closing stages; he narrowly avoided a collision with Alonso. The incident was subject to a stewards' investigation; the stewards decided not to penalise Rosberg. Massa, Button, Hülkenberg, Schumacher and Sutil completed the top ten ahead of qualifying. Vettel was 16th; the result of running onto the grass.

== Qualifying ==
It's a special feeling to be on pole – it was very close. The track is good here – in the first sector there's not so much you can do, just hit your braking points at the right time, but the second and third sectors are quite entertaining with nice flowing corners, but it's easy to make a mistake. It was a small margin for pole, but it was enough and it was a good result as yesterday we didn't have smooth running. We had a puncture in the practice, so I hadn't done too many laps on the new track, which makes it harder to get into a rhythm. You have to take every race as it comes, Japan was a good result, but now in Korea all the focus is on tomorrow's race. The car was quick today, no doubt, but you still need to get the job done and the most important thing is that you remain calm, which we all did as we knew what we had in us. So, we got the job done today, but let's see for tomorrow.

— Sebastian Vettel on taking the pole position.

Saturday afternoon's qualifying session was divided into three parts. The first part ran for 20 minutes and eliminated the cars that finished 18th or lower. The second session lasted 15 minutes and eliminated cars that finished in positions 11 to 17. The final session determined pole position to tenth. Cars which competed in the final session were not allowed to change tyres before the race; these started the race fitted with the tyres with which they set their quickest lap times. It was held in overcast weather conditions. Tyre degradation on the soft compound tyres was heavy; the drivers set their laps on the hard tyres during the first session and switched to softs for the two remaining sessions.

With a lap of 1:35.585, Vettel set the fastest time at the end the final session on his second timed run, achieving his ninth pole position of the season. Although he was delighted to get pole position, he felt he lost time in the middle sector after making a mistake. Vettel's teammate Webber was also on the front row of the grid; he recorded a lap time 0.076 seconds slower. Webber was not happy with his first set of option tyres; he chose to do two more timed laps on a new set of option tyres in the third session. Alonso qualified third; he said his starting position had realised Ferrari's "maximum potential". He also aimed to ensure that he finished the race because rain had been forecast. Alonso had been the fastest driver during most of the third session until Vettel set his pole position lap. Hamilton set the first session's fastest time of 1:37.113; he almost did not challenge for pole position because he avoided making contact with the pit lane entry barrier. He fell to fourth overall in the final session. In the faster of the two Mercedes, Rosberg secured fifth place; Massa in the slower Ferrari placed sixth. Massa was not happy because he would start the race on the dirty side of the grid, having encountered traffic during the third session. Button complained about the lack of grip and that he could not get his tyres to the optimum temperature; he managed seventh position but was happy to start on the clean side of the grid. Kubica recorded the eighth-fastest time and struggled with oversteer, which prevented him from setting a faster lap time. Schumacher in the slower Mercedes took ninth place ahead of Barrichello in tenth. Barrichello was angry with Schumacher because he had blocked Barrichello during the second session. Schumacher went to Barrichello to apologise and was subsequently reprimanded by the stewards.

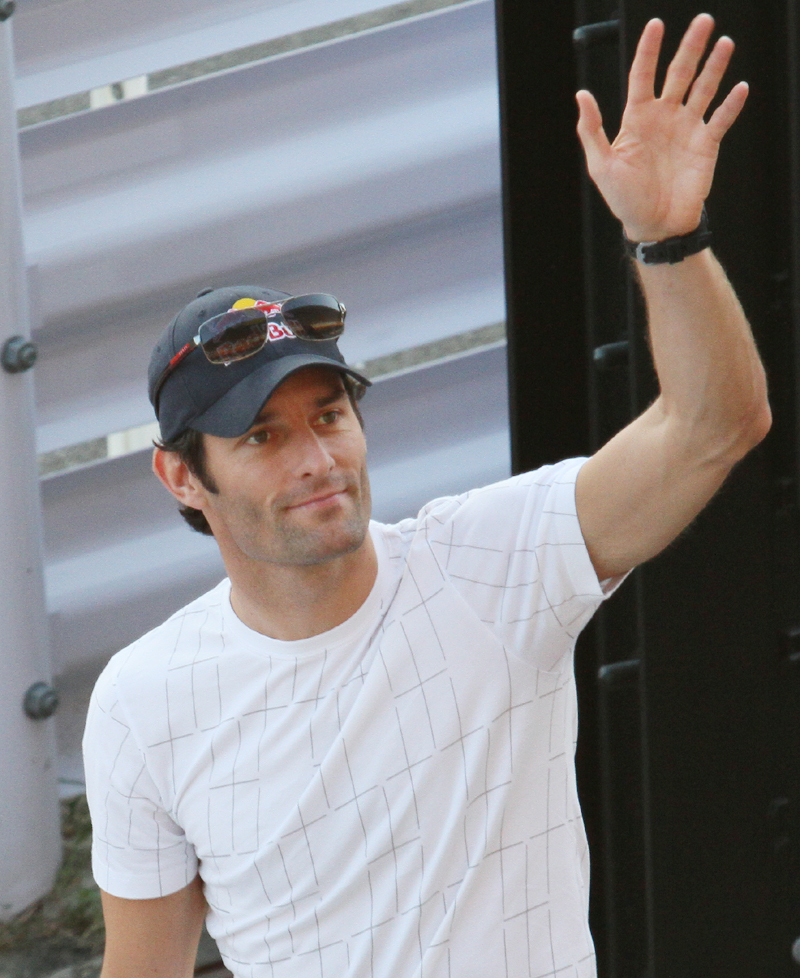
Mark Webber qualified in second alongside teammate Vettel.

Hülkenberg in 11th was the fastest driver not to advance into the final session. His best time of 1:37.620 was 1.5 seconds slower than Webber's pace in the second session. He said 11th was a "good position to start from" despite losing the rear of his car in turn twelve, which caused him to abort one of his quick laps. Hülkenberg was followed in the times by the BMW Sauber drivers Kobayashi in 12th and Heidfeld in 13th, followed by Sutil in the quickest of the two Force India cars. Petrov, who qualified in 15th, was penalised five positions on the grid because he had caused an avoidable accident with Hülkenberg at the start of the previous race at Suzuka. Petrov was aiming for a top ten grid position to minimise the effects of his grid penalty but he spun on his final timed lap after hitting a kerb; he was unable to set a quicker lap time because his tyres had become dirty. Hence, Jaime Alguersuari inherited 15th position, ahead of his teammate Sébastien Buemi who opted to run one flying lap with a light fuel load for his last run of the second session but made minor mistakes which cost him time. Vitantonio Liuzzi, Trulli and Timo Glock were the quickest drivers unable to advance beyond the first session. Liuzzi complained the tyre wear on his soft compound tyres was so excessive it created a large amount of oversteer for half a lap. The tenth row of the grid was filled by Heikki Kovalainen (Lotus) and Lucas di Grassi (Virgin). The two Hispania drivers completed the final two positions on the grid; Yamamoto in 23rd was 0.8 seconds faster than his teammate Senna in 24th.

=== Qualifying classification ===
The fastest lap in each of the three sessions is denoted in bold.

Pos	No.	Driver	Constructor	Q1	Q2	Q3	Grid
1	5	(Germany) Sebastian Vettel	Red Bull-Renault	1:37.123	1:36.074	**1:35.585**	1
2	6	(Australia) Mark Webber	Red Bull-Renault	1:37.373	**1:36.039**	1:35.659	2
3	8	(Spain) Fernando Alonso	Ferrari	1:37.144	1:36.287	1:35.766	3
4	2	(United Kingdom) Lewis Hamilton	McLaren-Mercedes	**1:37.113**	1:36.197	1:36.062	4
5	4	(Germany) Nico Rosberg	Mercedes	1:37.708	1:36.791	1:36.535	5
6	7	(Brazil) Felipe Massa	Ferrari	1:37.515	1:36.169	1:36.571	6
7	1	(United Kingdom) Jenson Button	McLaren-Mercedes	1:38.123	1:37.064	1:36.731	7
8	11	(Poland) Robert Kubica	Renault	1:37.703	1:37.179	1:36.824	8
9	3	(Germany) Michael Schumacher	Mercedes	1:37.980	1:37.077	1:36.950	9
10	9	(Brazil) Rubens Barrichello	Williams-Cosworth	1:38.257	1:37.511	1:36.998	10
11	10	(Germany) Nico Hülkenberg	Williams-Cosworth	1:38.115	1:37.620	N/A	11
12	23	(Japan) Kamui Kobayashi	BMW Sauber-Ferrari	1:38.429	1:37.643	N/A	12
13	22	(Germany) Nick Heidfeld	BMW Sauber-Ferrari	1:38.171	1:37.715	N/A	13
14	14	(Germany) Adrian Sutil	Force India-Mercedes	1:38.572	1:37.783	N/A	14
15	12	(Russia) Vitaly Petrov	Renault	1:38.174	1:37.799	N/A	20^{1}
16	17	(Spain) Jaime Alguersuari	Toro Rosso-Ferrari	1:38.583	1:37.853	N/A	15
17	16	(Switzerland) Sébastien Buemi	Toro Rosso-Ferrari	1:38.621	1:38.594	N/A	16
18	15	(Italy) Vitantonio Liuzzi	Force India-Mercedes	1:38.955	N/A	N/A	17
19	18	(Italy) Jarno Trulli	Lotus-Cosworth	1:40.521	N/A	N/A	18
20	24	(Germany) Timo Glock	Virgin-Cosworth	1:40.748	N/A	N/A	19
21	19	(Finland) Heikki Kovalainen	Lotus-Cosworth	1:41.768	N/A	N/A	21
22	25	(Brazil) Lucas di Grassi	Virgin-Cosworth	1:42.325	N/A	N/A	22
23	20	(Japan) Sakon Yamamoto	HRT-Cosworth	1:42.444	N/A	N/A	23
24	21	(Brazil) Bruno Senna	HRT-Cosworth	1:43.283	N/A	N/A	24

Notes:

1. – Renault's Vitaly Petrov was given a retroactive five-place grid penalty for causing an avoidable accident with Williams's Nico Hülkenberg at the start of the Japanese Grand Prix.

== Race ==
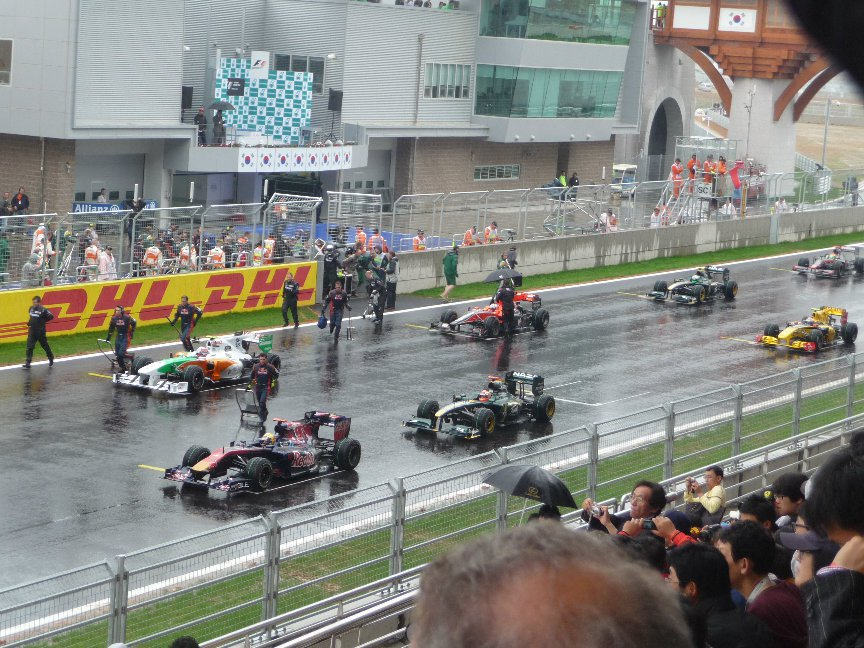
The drivers returned to the grid under safety car conditions after the race was suspended because of heavy rain and spray.

The track was wet before the race because rain had fallen the previous night. The air temperature was 20 °C (68 °F) and the track temperature was 18 °C (64 °F). Approximately 80,000 people attended the race. Ferrari discovered a water leak in Alonso's car, which was repaired in the hour before the event started. While on their reconnaissance laps, Massa, Senna and Glock left the circuit but avoided damage to their cars as drivers tested wet tyre compounds. The race was scheduled to start at 15:00 Korea Standard Time (UTC+9) but rain continued to fall. A new start time of 15:10 local time was planned. Standing water on the track caused heavy spray and impaired visibility, meaning the race would start behind the safety car. All cars were required to use the full wet tyres.

The race began without a formation lap and despite the slow speed, drivers struggled for grip on the wet surface. After three laps under the safety car, conditions were unchanged; drivers reported on the circuit's condition via radio and the race was suspended. Light rain prevented the race's resumption for more than 45 minutes until the marshals and road sweeping trucks removed some of the excess water and dirt on the track. Resin on the newly laid track surface had prevented water from soaking into the ground. The rain had eased slightly during the suspension. Teams were allowed to change the set-up of their cars, which were largely optimised for dry weather conditions.

The race was restarted behind the safety car with the drivers in the positions held before the suspension. The safety car remained out for 14 laps, during which the standing water was reduced as the cars circulated the track. Schumacher, Liuzzi and Yamamoto left the circuit during this period but were all able to rejoin. Di Grassi made a pit stop for new tyres three times under safety car and Senna made a pit stop at the end of the first lap. Once the safety car drove into the pit lane at the conclusion of lap 17, cars were allowed to overtake. Vettel maintained his pole-position lead going into the first turn with Webber close behind. Further back, Schumacher passed Kubica for eighth place. Senna and Trulli spun off onto the run-off area but both drivers were able to continue. Rosberg passed Hamilton by taking the inside line to take fourth place at the third corner. Button tried to overtake Massa heading into turn four but ran wide. He momentarily lost the advantage and fended off Schumacher's attempts to pass him.

At the end of the first racing lap, Vettel led by 2.8 seconds from Webber, who was followed by Alonso, Rosberg, Hamilton, Massa, Button, Schumacher, Kubica, Hülkenberg and Sutil. Alonso chose a cautious approach and lost four to five seconds while building up his pace slowly in the early stages. Sutil ran off the circuit but continued after losing his position to both Williams drivers. Webber lost grip on the next lap after running across the outside kerbing and spinning across the track onto the wall between turns 12 and 13; he slid back onto the circuit and collected Rosberg, forcing both drivers to retire. The debris on-track from the accident called the safety car to be deployed. Kobayashi, Petrov, Heidfeld and Buemi all made pit stops for intermediate tyres during the safety car period.

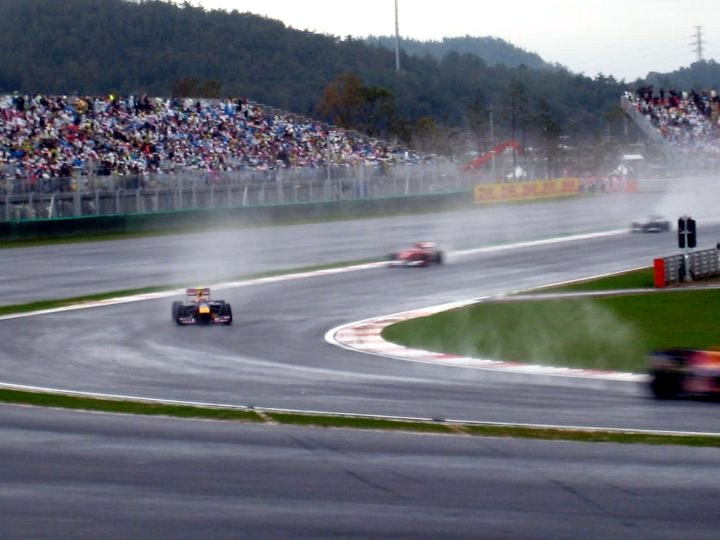
Sebastian Vettel led Mark Webber during the early phase of the race.

The safety car pulled off the track at the end of lap 23 and the race resumed with Vettel leading from Alonso and Hamilton. Vettel began to gradually pull clear from the rest of the field. On the 24th lap while battling with Senna for 21st place, Trulli collided with Senna after attempting a passing manoeuvre around the inside; Trulli's front wing was knocked off. Trulli drove to his garage for repairs. Button, who was in fifth, started to place Massa under pressure on the same lap. Kobayashi passed Yamamoto on lap 26 but ran wide and fell down the order, while Trulli rejoined the race. Di Grassi lost control of his car at turn 14 after trying to pass Yamamoto on lap 27; he made light contact with the wall which caused him to retire.

Schumacher passed Button for fifth position at turn three on the same lap. On lap 28, Trulli drove back to his garage to retire with a hydraulics failure that was caused by his power steering becoming heavy during the safety car period. Vettel set a new fastest lap of the race of 1:54.098, extending his lead over Alonso to 3.5 seconds. Button, who was under pressure from Hülkenberg and Kubica, made a pit stop at the end of lap 28 for intermediate tyres and rejoined in 15th place. Kovalainen was sent into a spin by Buemi, having been passed by Petrov two laps later.

On lap 31, Buemi tried to pass Glock on the inside heading into turn three but lost control of his car under braking and rammed into the side of Glock. Buemi sustained a broken left, front suspension and front wing damage, causing him to retire. The incident called for the race's third safety car period. During the safety car deployment, most of the drivers made pit stops for intermediate tyres. Alonso, who was called in by Ferrari when Vettel changed his strategy, had a pit stop that proved problematic. He arrived into his pit box sideways after locking his tyres. One of his mechanics could not fit his front right wheel because he dropped a wheel nut; he was required to fit a spare wheel nut onto the tyre, causing Alonso to be stationary for longer than usual. He lost third place to Hamilton.

Ferrari ordered Massa to reduce his car speed on his out-lap to help Alonso minimise the effects of losing second position. Glock drove back to his pit box where his mechanics examined his car for damage and decided to retire him from the race. Kubica avoided making contact with Sutil when his lollipop man stopped him before he could drive away from his pit box. It was the second time that season Kubica and Sutil were involved in an incident in a pit lane; Kubica had made contact with Sutil when the latter was driving into his pit box in the Hungarian Grand Prix. The safety car drove into the pit lane at the end of the 34th lap and Vettel led at the restart. Hamilton ran deep heading into the first corner, allowing Alonso to retake second position and immediately came under attack from Massa. Kubica took eighth place from Hülkenberg by taking the inside line at the third corner. Sutil took to the inside line and passed Button for 12th on lap 36. Button was pushed wide onto the run-off area and fell to 15th position.

As Vettel maintained his lead, the stewards informed the Lotus team that Kovalainen had been caught speeding in the pit lane, for which he was served with a drive through penalty that was taken on lap 39. Alonso set a new fastest lap and closed the gap to 1.2 seconds behind Vettel at the start of lap 37. Further back, Sutil overtook Heidfeld for 12th on the following lap. Sutil tried to pass Kobayashi on lap 38 at turn three but out-braked himself, allowing Kobayashi to retake the position. He passed Kobayashi due to his higher straight line speed, but Sutil braked later and slid off the track, rejoining in 14th. One lap later, Alonso was told by his team to drive less aggressively through turns seven and eight in an effort to preserve tyre life because he was spinning his tyres under acceleration. At the conclusion of lap 39, all of the drivers had made pit stops. Vettel was leading Alonso, who was followed by Hamilton, Massa, Schumacher, Barrichello, Petrov, Hülkenberg, Kubica and Liuzzi. A dry line began to emerge on lap 41 as Petrov lost control of the rear-end of his car between turns 17 and 18; he slid sideways into the tyre barrier at the pit lane entry.

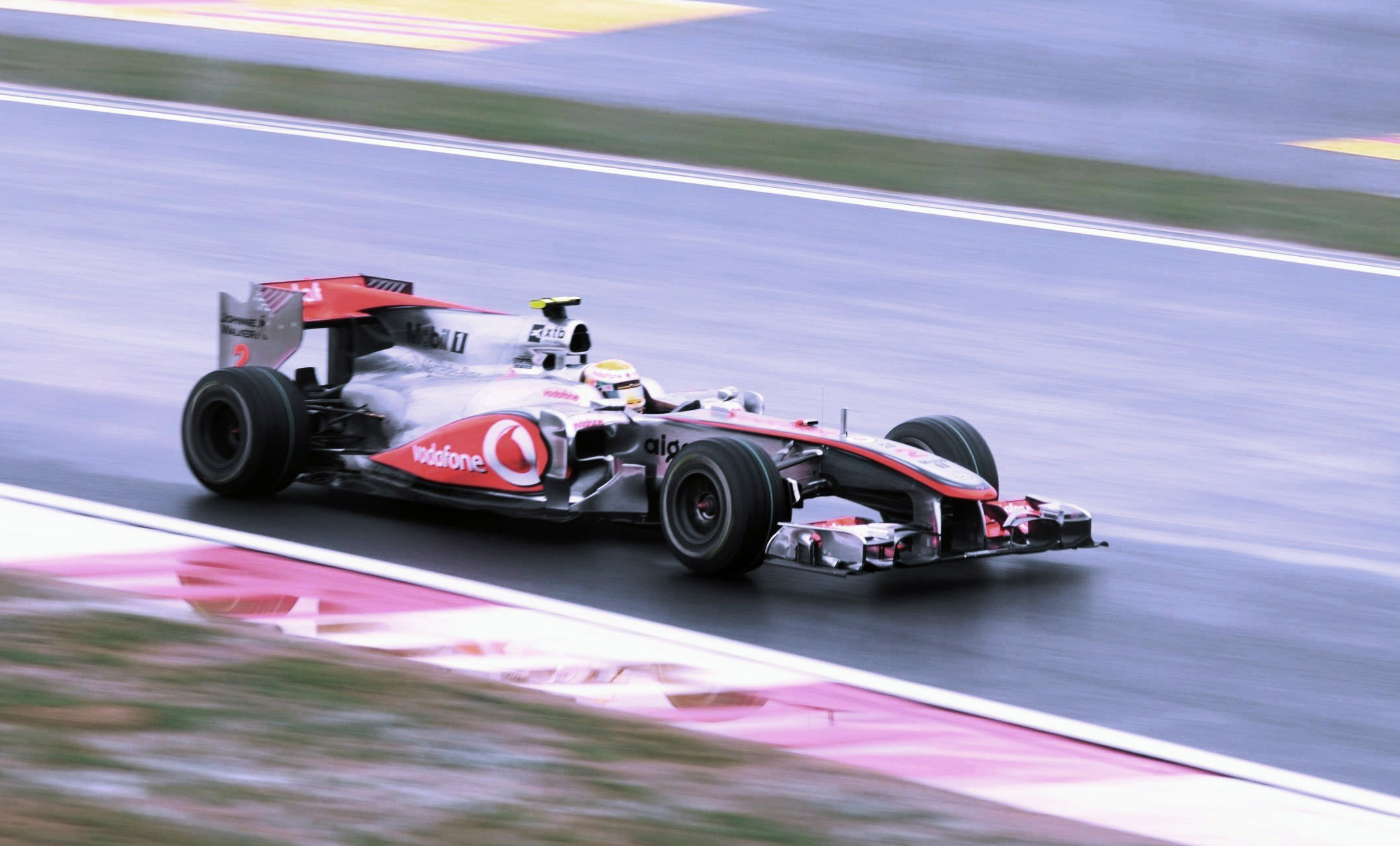
Lewis Hamilton finished second, despite running wide at the first turn on lap 35 which allowed Fernando Alonso to take over second place.

With sunset approaching, race director Charlie Whiting decided on lap 43 that the Grand Prix would only run for a further 25 minutes. Alonso had reduced Vettel's lead to 1.1 seconds as Alonso set the event's fastest lap of 1:50.257 on lap 42. By lap 44, fading light reduced visibility and Vettel reported he could not see the braking point in turn one, while Hamilton told his team the light level was "fine". Drivers were dazzled and blinded by the gear-shift lights on their steering wheels as a consequence. Vettel lost half of his engine capacity through turn 17 on lap 45 and felt strong vibrations. At the start of the 46th lap, Vettel slowed with his engine problems and Alonso passed him around the inside to take the lead. Vettel then pulled into a gap at the main straight wall with smoke billowing from his engine, and retired. Sutil tried to overtake Kobayashi on lap 47 but he slid into the side of the Sauber; Sutil went off the track to retire with suspension damage while Kobayashi continued. Hülkenberg spun off the track on lap 52 and made a pit stop for new tyres because his engineer on the pit-wall told him one of his tyres had developed a slow puncture. Barrichello ran wide on the same lap and fell to seventh behind Kubica and Liuzzi.

Alonso opened a gap of 14 seconds to Hamilton, who was suffering from wear on his tyres, as the drivers struggled for grip and crossed the finish line on lap 55; it was Alonso's fifth victory of the season in a time of 2'48:20.810, at an average speed of 68.349 miles per hour (109.997 km/h). Hamilton finished in second place, 14.9 seconds behind, ahead of Massa in third. Schumacher, who explored the best places on the circuit for grip, equalled his best result of the season at the races in Spain and Turkey in fourth. He was followed by Kubica, Liuzzi, Barrichello, Kobayashi and Heidfeld in positions five to nine. Hülkenberg passed Alguersuari on the final lap to complete the points-paying positions in tenth. Button was the last driver on the lead lap, with Kovalainen in 13th Hispania teammates Senna and Yamamoto were the last of the classified finishers in 14th and 15th, which was the team's best race finish of the season.

=== Post-race ===
It is a great feeling winning this way, as it was a very difficult victory, given the track conditions. Especially at the start, the situation on track and in terms of visibility was really precarious. That was the most worrying time, because I knew it would be an achievement just to stay on the track. We had never driven here in the wet and so there was no reference point. Webber's retirement slightly changed our approach because, all in all, it would have been sufficient to finish on the podium without taking too many risks. The final stages were particularly difficult because half the track was almost dry and the tyres were getting ruined really quickly. I witnessed both Red Bull problems from very close up: in these situations you try and stay super-concentrated, because you are coming from a high speed corner and there is no time to think.

— Fernando Alonso after the race.

The top three drivers appeared on the podium to collect their trophies and spoke to the media at a later press conference. Alonso said the Grand Prix was "one of the best races of the year" for the Ferrari team and that the wet weather conditions made the victory more difficult; "I think it's one of the most tricky conditions' victories I've ever had, probably, because we started with very extreme conditions, red flag, then a couple of laps behind the safety car". Alonso said he would not alter his driving style in the final two rounds of the season. Hamilton said finishing in second was "a great result" and that he was "very happy". He also said he lost time to other drivers in the final third of the lap because of braking problems. Massa said that despite the poor visibility he endured he was happy to finish third. He also said he struggled with his rear tyres, which caused him to slow.

Petrov said he had mixed feelings after the race, having been in seventh position before his race-ending crash on lap forty-one, "I am disappointed to end the race in the wall and not in the points, but it was encouraging to be running in the top ten". Barrichello, placed fifth before he ran wide on lap fifty-two and was passed by Kubica and Liuzzi, said, "I was lucky with the timing of the safety car and we were running in a good position right up until the closing stages. Unfortunately, I just ran out of tyre in the last five laps which cost us two places in the end."

Webber said he was at fault for causing the accident between himself and Rosberg on lap 19; "I thought I'd managed to catch it but I lost the car and made contact with the wall. Then Nico hit me, which wrecked his race as well. It was my mistake and it wasn't my day." Rosberg was puzzled over the incident; he said, "I don't understand why Webber didn't hit the brakes. It was crazy to roll back across the track like that." Gerhard Berger, who raced in Formula One for 13 years, courted controversy when he accused Webber of crashing deliberately and claimed Webber planned to take out either Alonso or Hamilton. Red Bull team principal Christian Horner defended Webber in an interview with The Daily Telegraph, saying it was "absurd" that Webber attempted to take out another competitor and stated the car suffered heavy damage with the collision with the wall. Webber later went to Rosberg and apologised for the crash on the Friday before the Brazilian Grand Prix.

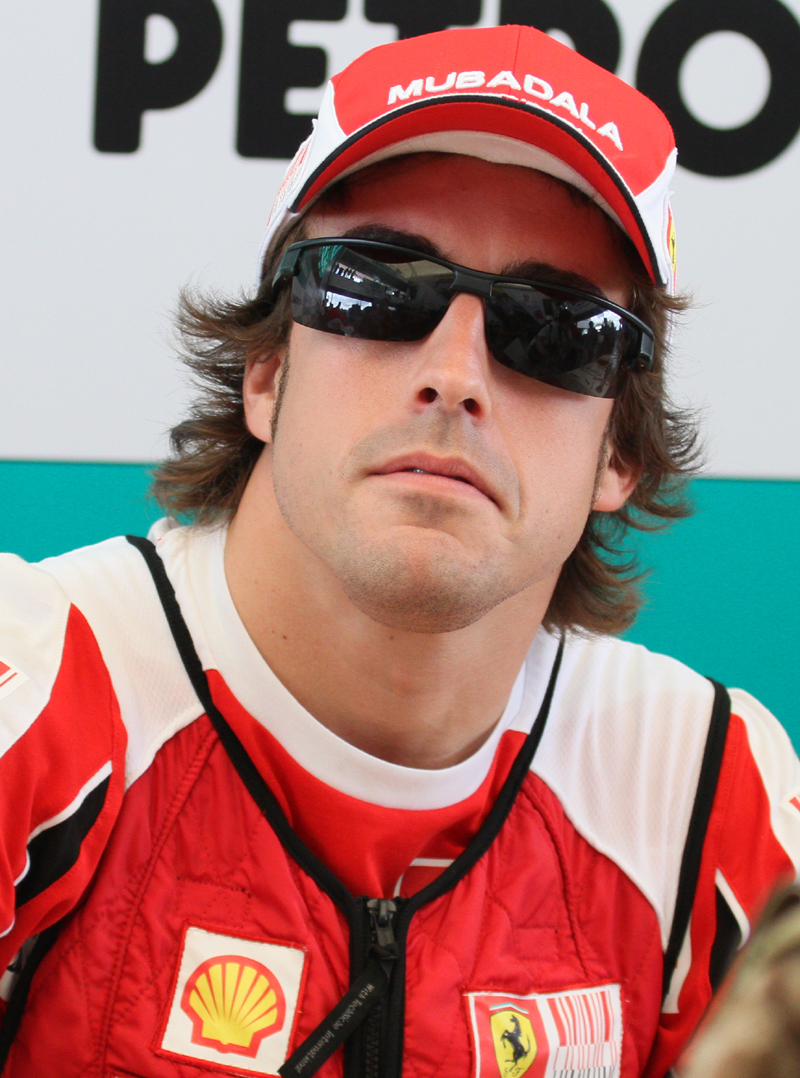
Fernando Alonso won the race and became the championship points leader after Webber's retirement.

Vettel said Red Bull "did more or less, a perfect job" in the race until his retirement from an engine failure on the forty-sixth lap. Renault principal engineer Fabrice Lom apologised to Red Bull for Vettel's engine failure. It was later revealed by Vettel that the engine was not to have been used in future races had it not failed. Horner subsequently said Red Bull would not be favouring Vettel or Webber for the Drivers' Championship. In 2011, Red Bull advisor Helmut Marko said he had considered retirement from the sport after Vettel and Webber failed to finish because he believed Red Bull had lost the possibility to win the title in 2010. After Webber and Vettel retired, members of the McLaren and Ferrari teams celebrated the events. Sauber team principal Peter Sauber told Blick it was "very unsporting" and that "they were scenes that didn't please me at all". Button said problems with his front tyres caused him to lock up under braking. He later described his race as "sad". Button also told journalists he believed he was unable to defend the Drivers' Championship though said he would not assist Hamilton unless Button was mathematically ruled out.

Buemi and Sutil were summoned to the stewards for the roles in their respective accidents and incurred five-place grid penalties for the next race at Interlagos. Sutil was fined $10,000 (£6,400) for driving in the manner that was performed, despite knowing of a problem with his brakes. Sutil said he struggled with excessive brake force, which caused him to lock his tyres; he was unhappy with his performance. Kobayashi said he saw Sutil in his mirror and believed he would not complete the manoveure. Buemi said his accident with Glock was caused by him braking late and said he felt "sorry" for Glock.

The use of a safety car to start the race had a mixed response within the sport. Massa thanked Whiting in the media; he said he felt Whiting "did an excellent job of managing the situation, making the right decisions as to when to start the race and when to bring in the Safety Car at the right moment". Schumacher, Petrov, Sutil and Buemi also agreed with the decision to start under safety-car conditions. Hamilton said he felt the length of time under safety-car conditions was not "good for the spectators and it's not fun for the drivers". He additionally felt the track was dry enough for a normal restart. BBC commentator and former driver Martin Brundle said he felt the race should have started earlier, while Button said he thought it should have been stopped before visibility deteriorated. Nevertheless, the Grand Prix was awarded the Race Promoters Trophy at the FIA Gala Awards held in Monte Carlo in December 2010.

As a consequence of the race, Alonso returned to the lead of the World Drivers' Championship on 231 championship points. Webber's failure to score dropped him to second, 11 championship points behind Alonso. Hamilton's second-place finish moved him ahead of Vettel, with Button still in fifth. Red Bull retained the World Constructors' Championship lead despite their drivers failing to finish. McLaren remained in second with 399 championship points; Ferrari had caught up to McLaren, the gap between the two teams reduced to 25 championship points with two races of the season remaining. Given Alonso's new lead, Vettel acknowledged his team had the fastest car in the season's two remaining races and said he remained confident of winning the Drivers' Championship. After the conclusion of the championship in Vettel's favour by four championship points, Webber's manager Flavio Briatore highlighted the Korean Grand Prix as one of Webber's most obvious lost opportunities in his bid to win the title.

=== Race classification ===
Drivers who scored championship points are denoted in bold.

Pos	No.	Driver	Constructor	Laps	Time/Retired	Grid	Points
1	8	(Spain) **Fernando Alonso**	**Ferrari**	55	2:48:20.810	3	25
2	2	(United Kingdom) **Lewis Hamilton**	**McLaren-Mercedes**	55	+14.999	4	18
3	7	(Brazil) **Felipe Massa**	**Ferrari**	55	+30.868	6	15
4	3	(Germany) **Michael Schumacher**	**Mercedes**	55	+39.688	9	12
5	11	(Poland) **Robert Kubica**	**Renault**	55	+47.734	8	10
6	15	(Italy) **Vitantonio Liuzzi**	**Force India-Mercedes**	55	+53.571	17	8
7	9	(Brazil) **Rubens Barrichello**	**Williams-Cosworth**	55	+1:09.257	10	6
8	23	(Japan) **Kamui Kobayashi**	**BMW Sauber-Ferrari**	55	+1:17.889	12	4
9	22	(Germany) **Nick Heidfeld**	**BMW Sauber-Ferrari**	55	+1:20.107	13	2
10	10	(Germany) **Nico Hülkenberg**	**Williams-Cosworth**	55	+1:20.851	11	1
11	17	(Spain) Jaime Alguersuari	Toro Rosso-Ferrari	55	+1:24.146	15	
12	1	(United Kingdom) Jenson Button	McLaren-Mercedes	55	+1:29.939	7	
13	19	(Finland) Heikki Kovalainen	Lotus-Cosworth	54	+1 Lap	21	
14	21	(Brazil) Bruno Senna	HRT-Cosworth	53	+2 Laps	24	
15	20	(Japan) Sakon Yamamoto	HRT-Cosworth	53	+2 Laps	23	
Ret	14	(Germany) Adrian Sutil	Force India-Mercedes	46	Collision	14	
Ret	5	(Germany) Sebastian Vettel	Red Bull-Renault	45	Engine	1	
Ret	12	(Russia) Vitaly Petrov	Renault	39	Accident	20	
Ret	24	(Germany) Timo Glock	Virgin-Cosworth	31	Collision damage	19	
Ret	16	(Switzerland) Sébastien Buemi	Toro Rosso-Ferrari	30	Collision	16	
Ret	25	(Brazil) Lucas di Grassi	Virgin-Cosworth	25	Accident	22	
Ret	18	(Italy) Jarno Trulli	Lotus-Cosworth	25	Hydraulics	18	
Ret	6	(Australia) Mark Webber	Red Bull-Renault	18	Collision	2	
Ret	4	(Germany) Nico Rosberg	Mercedes	18	Collision	5	

== Championship standings after the race ==
Drivers' Championship standings

	Pos.	Driver	Points
1	1	(Spain) Fernando Alonso*	231
1	2	(Australia) Mark Webber*	220
1	3	(United Kingdom) Lewis Hamilton*	210
1	4	(Germany) Sebastian Vettel*	206
	5	(United Kingdom) Jenson Button*	189

Constructors' Championship standings

Pos.	Constructor	Points
1	(Austria) Red Bull-Renault*	426
2	(United Kingdom) McLaren-Mercedes*	399
3	(Italy) Ferrari*	374
4	(Germany) Mercedes	188
5	(France) Renault	143

- Note: Only the top five positions are included for both sets of standings.
- Bold text and an asterisk indicates competitors who still had a theoretical chance of becoming World Champion.

== Footnotes ==
Previous race: 2010 Japanese Grand Prix	FIA Formula One World Championship; 2010 season	Next race: 2010 Brazilian Grand Prix
Previous race: None	Korean Grand Prix	Next race: 2011 Korean Grand Prix
Awards
Preceded by 2009 Abu Dhabi Grand Prix	Formula One Promotional Trophy for Race Promoter; 2010	Succeeded by 2011 Indian Grand Prix
