= 2013 Chinese Grand Prix =

Race 3 of 19 in the 2013 Formula One World Championship
← Previous race	Next race →
- Layout of the Shanghai International Circuit

Race details
- Date: 14 April 2013
- Official name: 2013 Formula 1 UBS Chinese Grand Prix
- Location: Shanghai International Circuit; Shanghai, People's Republic of China
- Course: Permanent racing facility
- Course length: 5.451 km (3.387 miles)
- Distance: 56 laps, 305.066 km (189.559 miles)
- Weather: Cloudy

Pole position
Driver	(United Kingdom) Lewis Hamilton	Mercedes
- Time: 1:34.484

Fastest lap
Driver	(Germany) Sebastian Vettel	Red Bull-Renault
- Time: 1:36.808 on lap 53

Podium
First	(Spain) Fernando Alonso	Ferrari
Second	(Finland) Kimi Räikkönen	Lotus-Renault
Third	(United Kingdom) Lewis Hamilton	Mercedes

The 2013 Chinese Grand Prix (formally known as the 2013 Formula 1 UBS Chinese Grand Prix) was a Formula One motor race held on 14 April 2013 at the Shanghai International Circuit in Shanghai, China. The race was the third round of the 2013 season, and marked the tenth running of the Chinese Grand Prix as a round of the Formula One World Championship. The race was won by Fernando Alonso.

== Report ==
=== Background ===
Like the 2012 Chinese Grand Prix, tyre supplier Pirelli brought its white-banded medium compound tyre as the harder "prime" tyre and the yellow-banded soft compound tyre as the softer "option" tyre.

=== Qualifying ===
==== Q1 ====
As in previous qualifying sessions, the Caterham and Marussia cars were eliminated in the first round of qualifying. Sauber's Esteban Gutiérrez and Williams's Valtteri Bottas were also eliminated. The fastest time of 1:35.793 was posted by Lewis Hamilton. All cars were comfortably within the 107% cutoff time of 1:42.498.

==== Q2 ====
Mark Webber, who had posted the 4th fastest time in Q1, ran out of fuel during his second attempt to post a time. Unable to provide the required 1 litre fuel sample, he was penalised by being forced to start at the back of the grid. As they did with Sebastian Vettel when he ran out of fuel during qualifying for the 2012 Abu Dhabi Grand Prix, the Red Bull team opted to change the gearbox on Webber's car to improve his overtaking ability, thereby obliging him to start from pit lane.

Eliminated from qualifying were Vergne, Maldonado, Webber, Sutil, Pérez and di Resta.

==== Q3 ====
Lewis Hamilton in the Mercedes once again posted the fastest time of the session to take pole position. Lotus Renault's Kimi Räikkönen was second and Ferrari's Fernando Alonso was third.

Hülkenberg opted to preserve his tyres and did not post a time for Q3. Vettel also failed to log a time, aborting his attempt after a braking problem. Jenson Button did a token lap to secure the eighth qualifying position.

=== Race ===
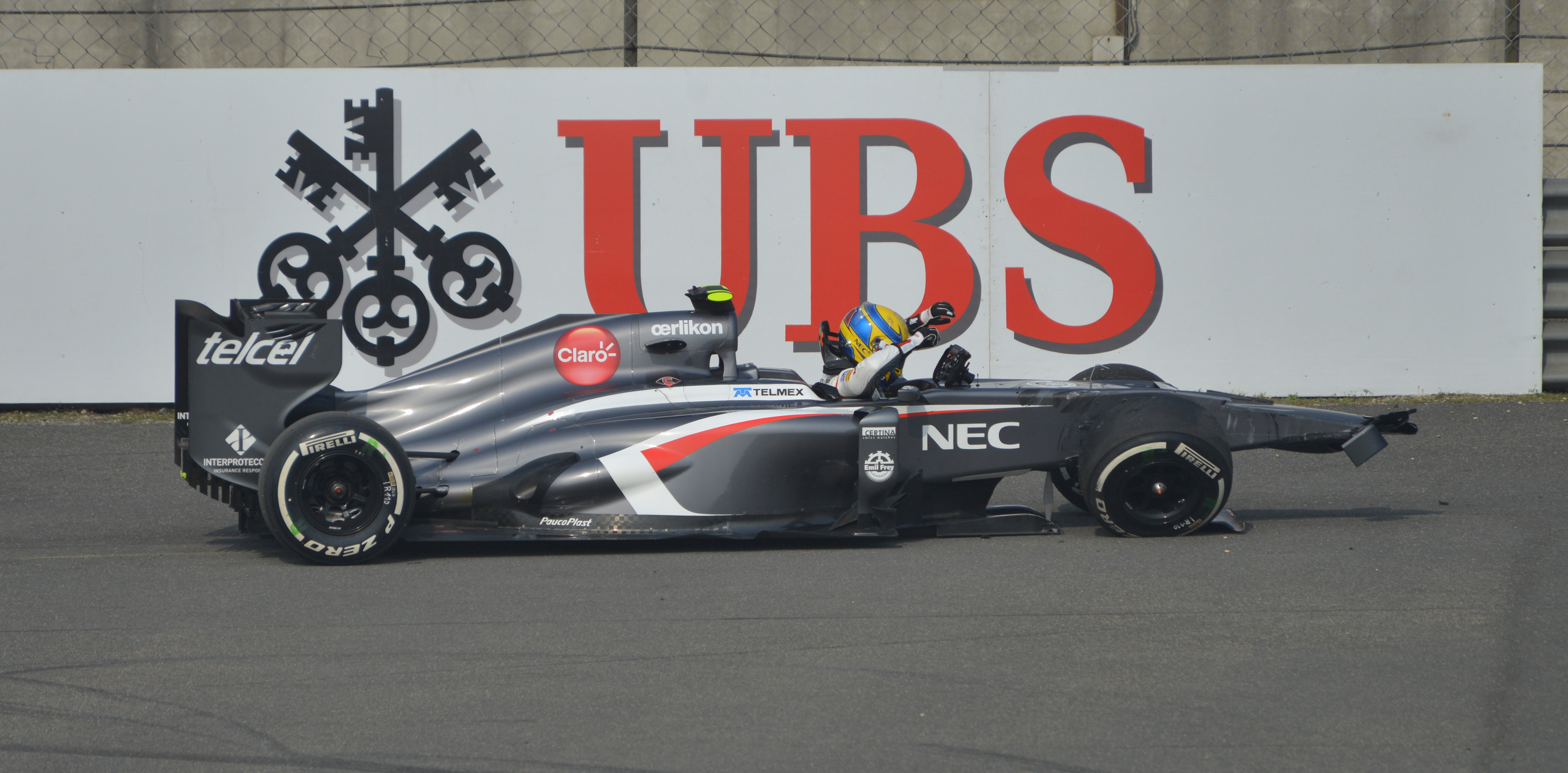
Esteban Gutiérrez exiting his stranded Sauber C32

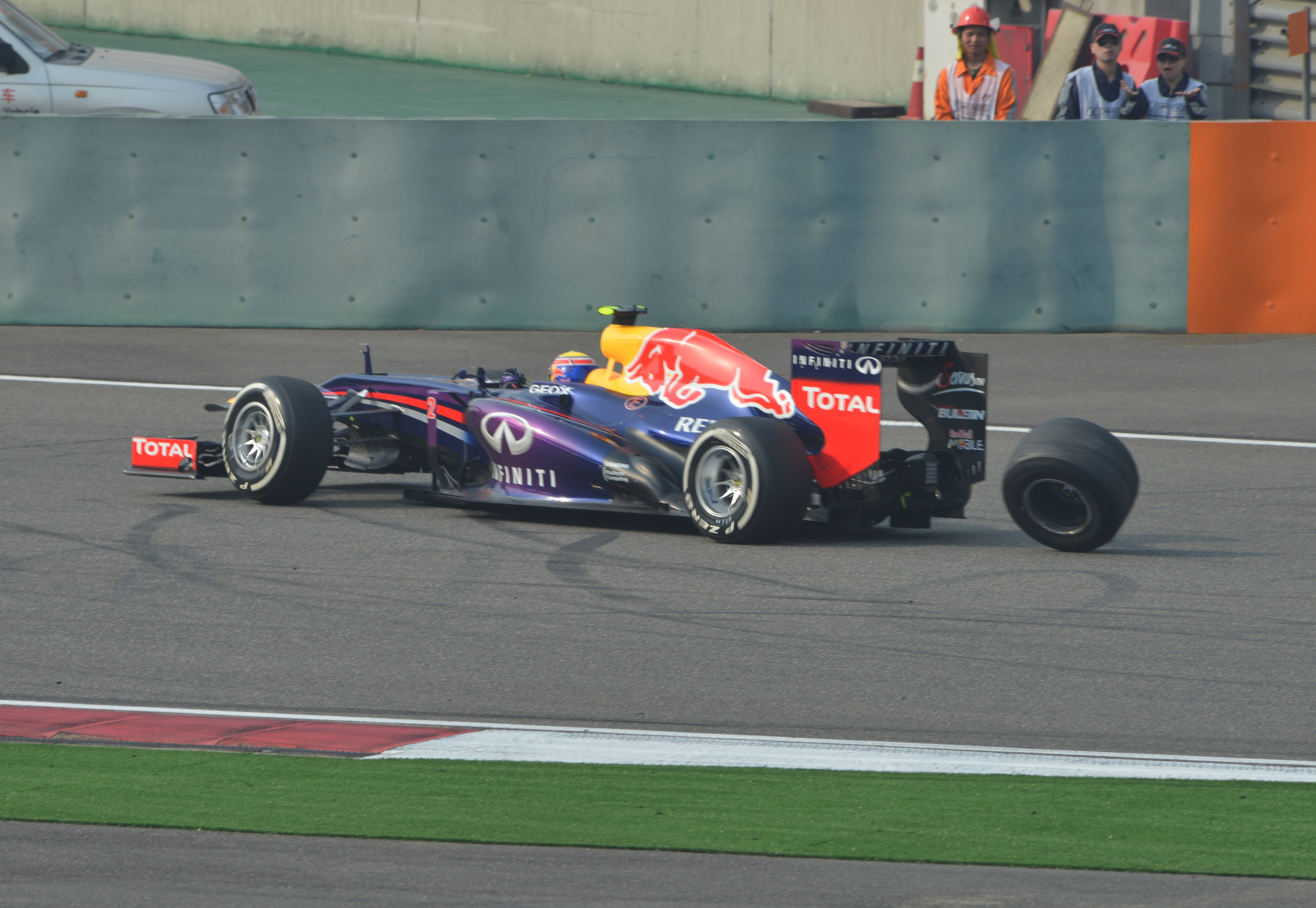
Mark Webber losing his wheel on lap 15

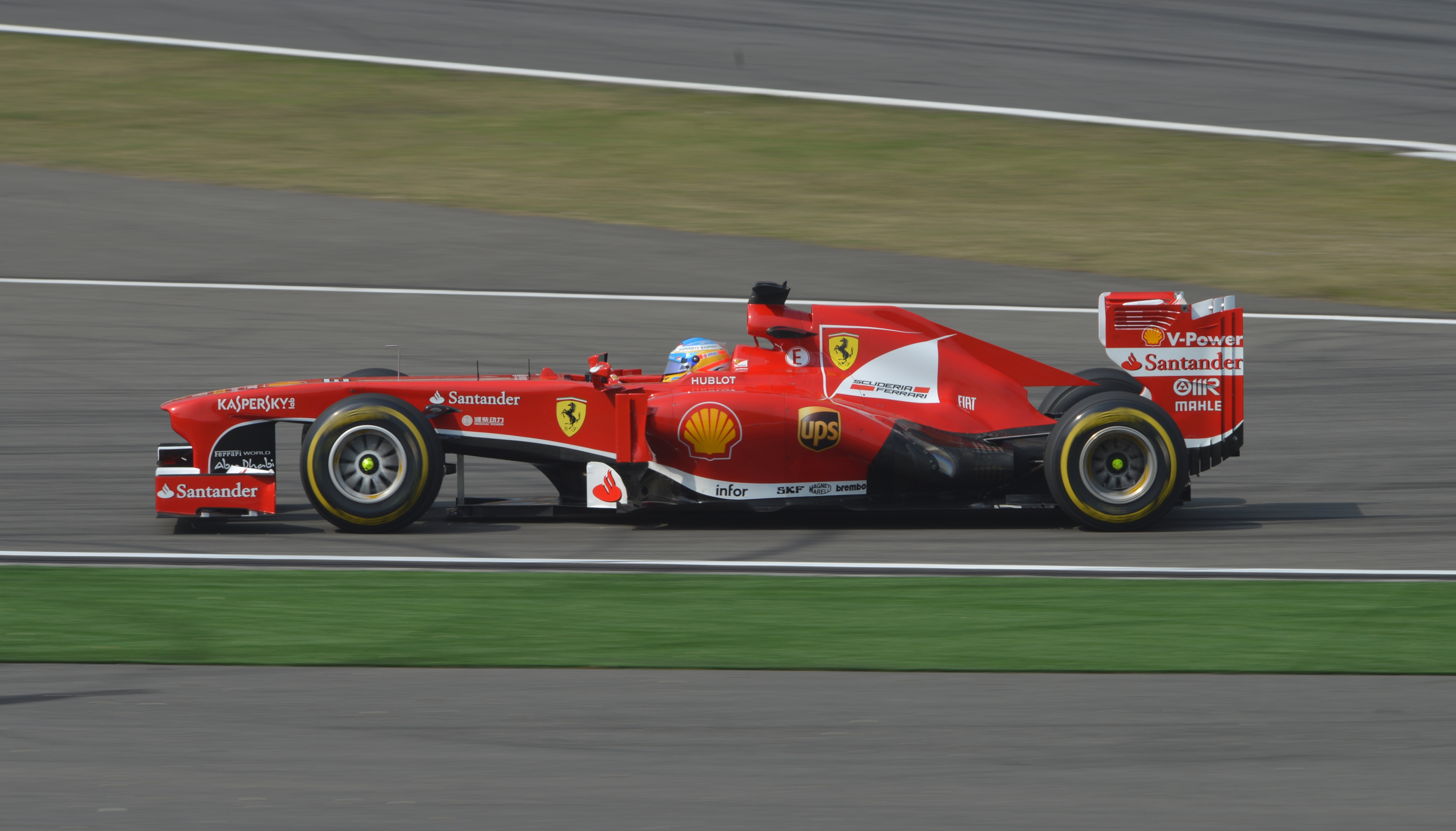
Fernando Alonso took his 31st Grand Prix victory

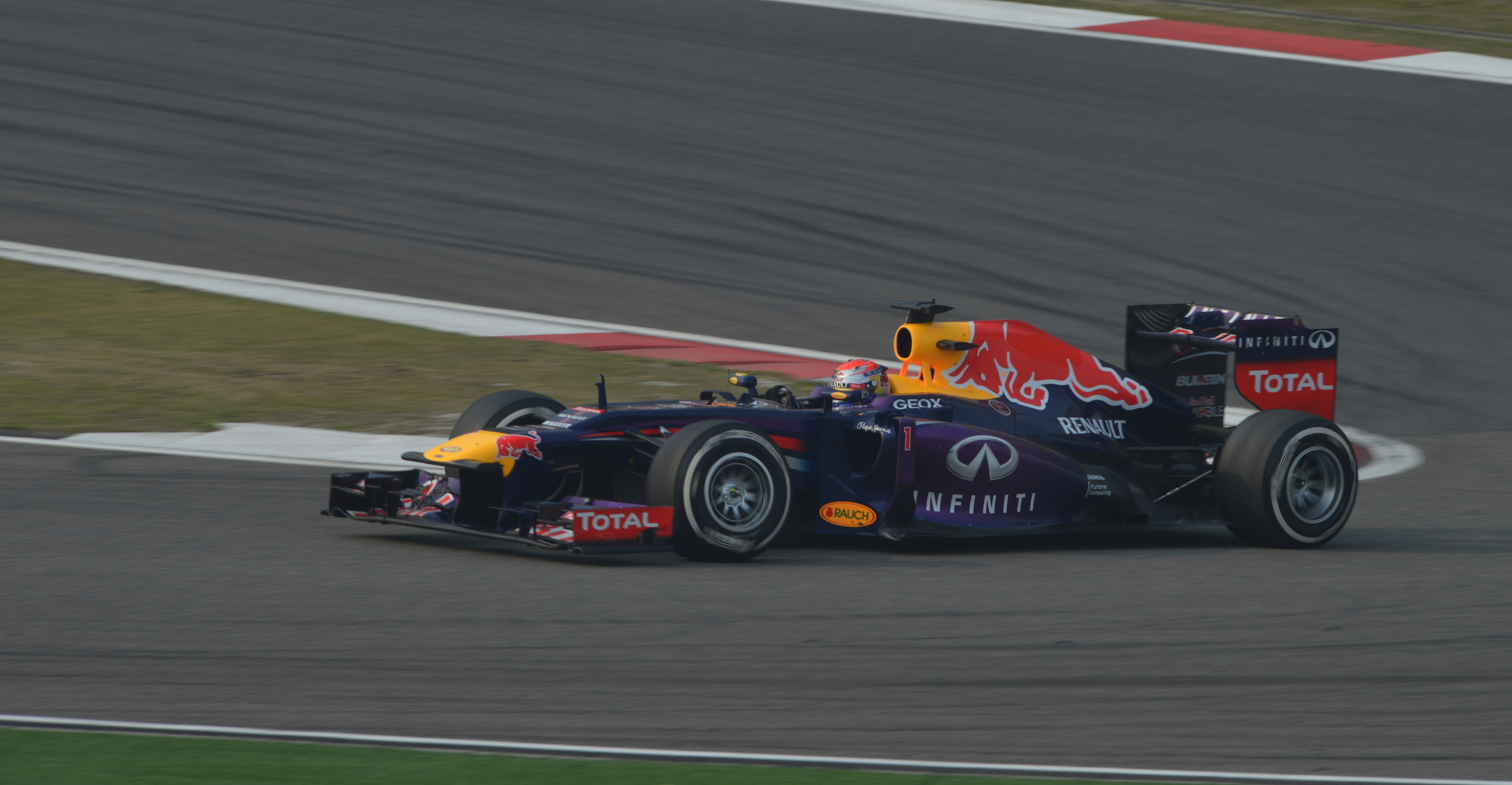
A late surge by Sebastian Vettel was not rewarded with a podium finish

Lewis Hamilton led from the start, ahead of Fernando Alonso, Felipe Massa and a slow-starting Kimi Räikkönen. Mark Webber was forced to pit for new tyres at the end of the first lap. Paul di Resta and Adrian Sutil lightly collided, with no damage suffered on either cars.

On lap 4, Alonso and Massa both passed Hamilton at exactly the same time on the first corner. Daniel Ricciardo was forced to pit a short time before. Nico Rosberg pitted on lap 5. On this same lap, Esteban Gutiérrez misjudged his braking into the hairpin at the end of the very long back straight, and went straight into the back of Adrian Sutil. Gutiérrez was out straight away, while Sutil was able to make it back to the pits. However, as he came in to try and fix the damage, his exhaust caught fire, and he retired from the race.

On laps 6 and 7, the pit lane was full of chaos, as Alonso, Massa, Räikkönen, Jules Bianchi, Giedo van der Garde, Max Chilton, Romain Grosjean, and Pastor Maldonado were all forced to pit due to heavy tyre degradation. Nico Hülkenberg found himself leading the race afterwards, ahead of Sebastian Vettel, Jenson Button, Sergio Pérez, and Paul di Resta.

Eventually on lap 14, Vettel, Hülkenberg, and di Resta pitted. At the same time, Mark Webber hit Jean-Éric Vergne, with both Vergne and Webber being forced to pit. Webber's troubles were not over however, because on the next lap, while driving around the hairpin on the back straight, his right rear wheel came off, and he was forced out. Then moments later, Räikkönen nudged the back of Pérez's McLaren, and damaged his Lotus's front wing. However, it wasn't damaged enough for him to pit, and he was able to continue.

On the 19th lap, Massa and Rosberg came in again to change their tyres, leaving Alonso and Button 1st and 2nd. Two laps later, Räikkönen and Hamilton pitted, but Nico Rosberg's race was over due to problems with his suspension. Alonso, Button, Grosjean, Ricciardo, Maldonado and Pérez pitted on lap 23, with Vettel taking the lead of the race. Alonso then set the fastest lap of the race, and began to reduce Vettel's lead, and Vettel was told on the radio to not resist an attack by Alonso. On lap 28, Alonso took the lead from Vettel. Both Vettel and Hülkenberg pitted on the next lap, for new hard compound tyres. Di Resta stopped 3 laps later, while Räikkönen and Valtteri Bottas pitted on lap 34. They were followed two laps later by Hülkenberg and Massa, and finally Hamilton, Grosjean and Vergne one lap later.

Alonso pitted for the last time on lap 41, while Räikkönen and Hamilton no longer needed to pit. However, Button and Vettel still had one pit stop to go. Button pitted on lap 49, Vettel on lap 51, and also di Resta on lap 53. There was an exciting duel between Hamilton and Vettel for the final podium slot, as Vettel reduced a 10-second gap, to only a few tenths within five laps. Alonso finally crossed the line to score his 31st grand prix victory on his 200th grand prix start, 10 seconds ahead of Räikkönen, while Hamilton managed to hold off Vettel for third place. Jenson Button finished fifth, Massa finished sixth, while Daniel Ricciardo drove an outstanding race to finish seventh, his then-best ever Formula One result. The final points positions were taken by di Resta, Grosjean and Hülkenberg.

Piero Ferrari picked up the trophy to receive it for the team. It was the first time in the history of Scuderia Ferrari that a Ferrari family member would step on the podium of a Formula One race.

== Classification ==
=== Qualifying ===
Pos.	No.	Driver	Constructor	Q1	Q2	Q3	Grid
1	10	(United Kingdom) Lewis Hamilton	Mercedes	1:35.793	1:35.078	1:34.484	1
2	7	(Finland) Kimi Räikkönen	Lotus-Renault	1:37.046	1:35.659	1:34.761	2
3	3	(Spain) Fernando Alonso	Ferrari	1:36.253	1:35.148	1:34.788	3
4	9	(Germany) Nico Rosberg	Mercedes	1:35.959	1:35.537	1:34.861	4
5	4	(Brazil) Felipe Massa	Ferrari	1:35.972	1:35.403	1:34.933	5
6	8	(France) Romain Grosjean	Lotus-Renault	1:36.929	1:36.065	1:35.364	6
7	19	(Australia) Daniel Ricciardo	Toro Rosso-Ferrari	1:36.993	1:36.258	1:35.998	7
8	5	(United Kingdom) Jenson Button	McLaren-Mercedes	1:36.667	1:35.784	2:05.673	8
9	1	(Germany) Sebastian Vettel	Red Bull-Renault	1:36.537	1:35.343	no time	9
10	11	(Germany) Nico Hülkenberg	Sauber-Ferrari	1:36.985	1:36.261	no time	10
11	14	(United Kingdom) Paul di Resta	Force India-Mercedes	1:37.478	1:36.287		11
12	6	(Mexico) Sergio Pérez	McLaren-Mercedes	1:36.952	1:36.314		12
13	15	(Germany) Adrian Sutil	Force India-Mercedes	1:37.349	1:36.405		13
14	16	(Venezuela) Pastor Maldonado	Williams-Renault	1:37.281	1:37.139		14
15	18	(France) Jean-Éric Vergne	Toro Rosso-Ferrari	1:37.508	1:37.199		15
16	17	(Finland) Valtteri Bottas	Williams-Renault	1:37.769			16
17	12	(Mexico) Esteban Gutiérrez	Sauber-Ferrari	1:37.990			17
18	22	(France) Jules Bianchi	Marussia-Cosworth	1:38.780			18
19	23	(United Kingdom) Max Chilton	Marussia-Cosworth	1:39.537			19
20	20	(France) Charles Pic	Caterham-Renault	1:39.614			20
21	21	(Netherlands) Giedo van der Garde	Caterham-Renault	1:39.660			21
EX	2	(Australia) Mark Webber	Red Bull-Renault	1:36.148	1:36.679		PL^{1}
107% time: 1:42.498

- ^1 Webber originally qualified 14th but was relegated to the back of the grid for failing to provide a one-litre fuel sample after qualifying. The Red Bull team opted to change Webber's gearbox to improve his straight line speed and overtaking ability, obliging them to start from the pit lane.

=== Race ===
Pos.	No.	Driver	Constructor	Laps	Time/Retired	Grid	Points
1	3	(Spain) Fernando Alonso	Ferrari	56	1:36:26.945	3	25
2	7	(Finland) Kimi Räikkönen	Lotus-Renault	56	+10.168	2	18
3	10	(United Kingdom) Lewis Hamilton	Mercedes	56	+12.322	1	15
4	1	(Germany) Sebastian Vettel	Red Bull-Renault	56	+12.525	9	12
5	5	(United Kingdom) Jenson Button	McLaren-Mercedes	56	+35.285	8	10
6	4	(Brazil) Felipe Massa	Ferrari	56	+40.827	5	8
7	19	(Australia) Daniel Ricciardo	Toro Rosso-Ferrari	56	+42.691	7	6
8	14	(United Kingdom) Paul di Resta	Force India-Mercedes	56	+51.084	11	4
9	8	(France) Romain Grosjean	Lotus-Renault	56	+53.423	6	2
10	11	(Germany) Nico Hülkenberg	Sauber-Ferrari	56	+56.598	10	1
11	6	(Mexico) Sergio Pérez	McLaren-Mercedes	56	+1:03.860	12	
12	18	(France) Jean-Éric Vergne	Toro Rosso-Ferrari	56	+1:12.604	15	
13	17	(Finland) Valtteri Bottas	Williams-Renault	56	+1:33.861	16	
14	16	(Venezuela) Pastor Maldonado	Williams-Renault	56	+1:35.453	14	
15	22	(France) Jules Bianchi	Marussia-Cosworth	55	+1 Lap	18	
16	20	(France) Charles Pic	Caterham-Renault	55	+1 Lap	20	
17	23	(United Kingdom) Max Chilton	Marussia-Cosworth	55	+1 Lap	19	
18	21	(Netherlands) Giedo van der Garde	Caterham-Renault	55	+1 Lap	21	
Ret	9	(Germany) Nico Rosberg	Mercedes	21	Suspension	4	
Ret	2	(Australia) Mark Webber	Red Bull-Renault	15	Wheel	PL	
Ret	15	(Germany) Adrian Sutil	Force India-Mercedes	5	Collision damage	13	
Ret	12	(Mexico) Esteban Gutiérrez	Sauber-Ferrari	4	Collision	17	

== Championship standings after the race ==
Drivers' Championship standings

	Pos.	Driver	Points
	1	(Germany) Sebastian Vettel	52
	2	(Finland) Kimi Räikkönen	49
3	3	(Spain) Fernando Alonso	43
	4	(United Kingdom) Lewis Hamilton	40
	5	(Brazil) Felipe Massa	30

Constructors' Championship standings

	Pos.	Constructor	Points
	1	(Austria) Red Bull-Renault	78
1	2	(Italy) Ferrari	73
1	3	(United Kingdom) Lotus-Renault	60
	4	(Germany) Mercedes	52
2	5	(United Kingdom) McLaren-Mercedes	14

- Note: Only the top five positions are included for both sets of standings.

Previous race: 2013 Malaysian Grand Prix	FIA Formula One World Championship; 2013 season	Next race: 2013 Bahrain Grand Prix
Previous race: 2012 Chinese Grand Prix	Chinese Grand Prix	Next race: 2014 Chinese Grand Prix
