= 2013 Italian Grand Prix =

Race 12 of 19 in the 2013 Formula One World Championship
← Previous race	Next race →
- Autodromo Nazionale di Monza

Race details
- Date: 8 September 2013
- Official name: 2013 Formula 1 Gran Premio d'Italia
- Location: Autodromo Nazionale di Monza; Monza, Italy
- Course: Permanent racing facility
- Course length: 5.793 km (3.600 miles)
- Distance: 53 laps, 307.029 km (190.580 miles)
- Weather: Cloudy

Pole position
Driver	(Germany) Sebastian Vettel	Red Bull-Renault
- Time: 1:23.755

Fastest lap
Driver	(United Kingdom) Lewis Hamilton	Mercedes
- Time: 1:25.849 on lap 51

Podium
First	(Germany) Sebastian Vettel	Red Bull-Renault
Second	(Spain) Fernando Alonso	Ferrari
Third	(Australia) Mark Webber	Red Bull-Renault

The 2013 Italian Grand Prix (formally known as the 2013 Formula 1 Gran Premio d'Italia) was a Formula One motor race held on 8 September 2013 at the Autodromo Nazionale di Monza in Monza, Italy. The race was the 12th round of the 2013 season, and the 83rd running of the Italian Grand Prix.

Prior to the weekend, Red Bull revealed that Daniel Ricciardo would be driving alongside Sebastian Vettel in 2014, taking over from Mark Webber, who moved to the Porsche Sportscar programme. Furthermore, Felipe Massa announced two days after the race that he would be leaving Ferrari at the end of 2013 after eight years with the team. On the next day, the Scuderia announced that former Ferrari driver and 2007 champion Kimi Räikkönen would take Massa's place.

== Qualifying ==
Tyre supplier Pirelli brought its hardest two compounds, with the orange-banded hard compound tyre being the harder "prime" tyre, and the white-banded medium compound tyre as the softer "option" tyre. This is the same tyre allocation as for the 2012 Italian Grand Prix. Sebastian Vettel and Red Bull looked strong in all three practice sessions prior to qualifying. The two biggest threats to a Vettel pole position, apart for Vettel's teammate Mark Webber, were Lewis Hamilton and, quite surprisingly, Ferrari's Fernando Alonso, who had strong pace on a single lap Saturday morning, an area where Ferrari struggled throughout the season. Three-time 2013 pole-sitter Nico Rosberg had really poor mileage in the final practice session due to overheating and was unlikely to fight for pole because of this.

=== Q1 ===
Drivers eliminated in the first qualifying session were both drivers from Caterham and Marussia as well as Valtteri Bottas of Williams and Sauber's Esteban Gutiérrez. Several drivers were out on track early on option tyres, including 2007 champion Kimi Räikkönen and Jean-Éric Vergne.

=== Q2 ===
The second qualifying session was the stage of a few surprises. First, both Lotus drivers were eliminated at the end of the 15 minutes session. Qualifying has never been the strength of the E21 this season, especially on the lowest downforce track of the season. The biggest disappointment of the session was the elimination of Hamilton's Mercedes. The five-time 2013 pole-sitter had an off at the exit of Curva Parabolica on his first flying lap and was impeded by Adrian Sutil on his second attempt at the entrance of the same turn. The German was later handed a three-place grid penalty for the race. It was the first time that Hamilton failed to make a Q3 appearance since the 2010 Malaysian Grand Prix. As a result, Hamilton's streak of consecutive Q3 appearances ended at 66.

=== Q3 ===
Both Ferraris and Red Bulls were out early as well as Rosberg's Mercedes. The red cars were using their towing tactic, which they practiced a lot during free practice. Vettel was the fastest man of that group with a time of 1:23.859. All ten cars then went out on track, either for a second run or for a first. Rosberg and Ricciardo were out first in the second wave as they opted for a two-flying lap run. Webber improved his time on his second run, but stayed second behind Vettel while the German also improved his fastest time to 1:23.755. Nico Hülkenberg set up for a massively impressive third place, especially with his teammate early exit in Q1. Ferrari's towing tactic did not do any good as the red cars could only manage fourth and fifth, with Felipe Massa in front of Alonso. Rosberg took a respectable sixth, considering his misfortune of Saturday morning. Ricciardo again showed great qualifying pace with seventh despite running wide at turn six. The McLaren duo could only manage eight and ninth, with Sergio Pérez in front, while Vergne had to settle for tenth with an off that was a near carbon copy of Hamilton's in Q2 at Curva Parabolica.

== Race ==
At the start, Red Bull's Sebastian Vettel led the race from pole position with Felipe Massa jumping up into second position, ahead of Mark Webber and teammate Fernando Alonso. Further down the order, Lotus' Kimi Räikkönen was forced to put his left wheels on the grass to avoid Sergio Pérez on the approach of Variante del Rettifilo, preventing the Finn to brake in time and to avoid running in the back of the Mexican's McLaren. Räikkönen had to pit for a new front wing at the end of the first lap. More drama unfolded during the first lap as Paul di Resta ran into the back of Romain Grosjean's Lotus. The Scot lost his front left wheel and retired his car on the spot, while Grosjean's car was left unscathed by the incident. On lap three, Alonso made his move on Webber at Variante della Roggia for third place and the Spaniard later passed his teammate at Variante del Rettifilo on lap eight for second place.

Lewis Hamilton picked up a slow puncture early on in the race as well as radio problems. This meant that his team could not tell him about the tire problem and had to communicate with him with the help of pit boards throughout the rest of the race. Hamilton's one stop strategy became a two-stopper because of the slow puncture and rejoined the track almost at the back of the grid. Further ahead, Jean-Éric Vergne was on his way to a points finish until his transmission failed on lap fifteen.

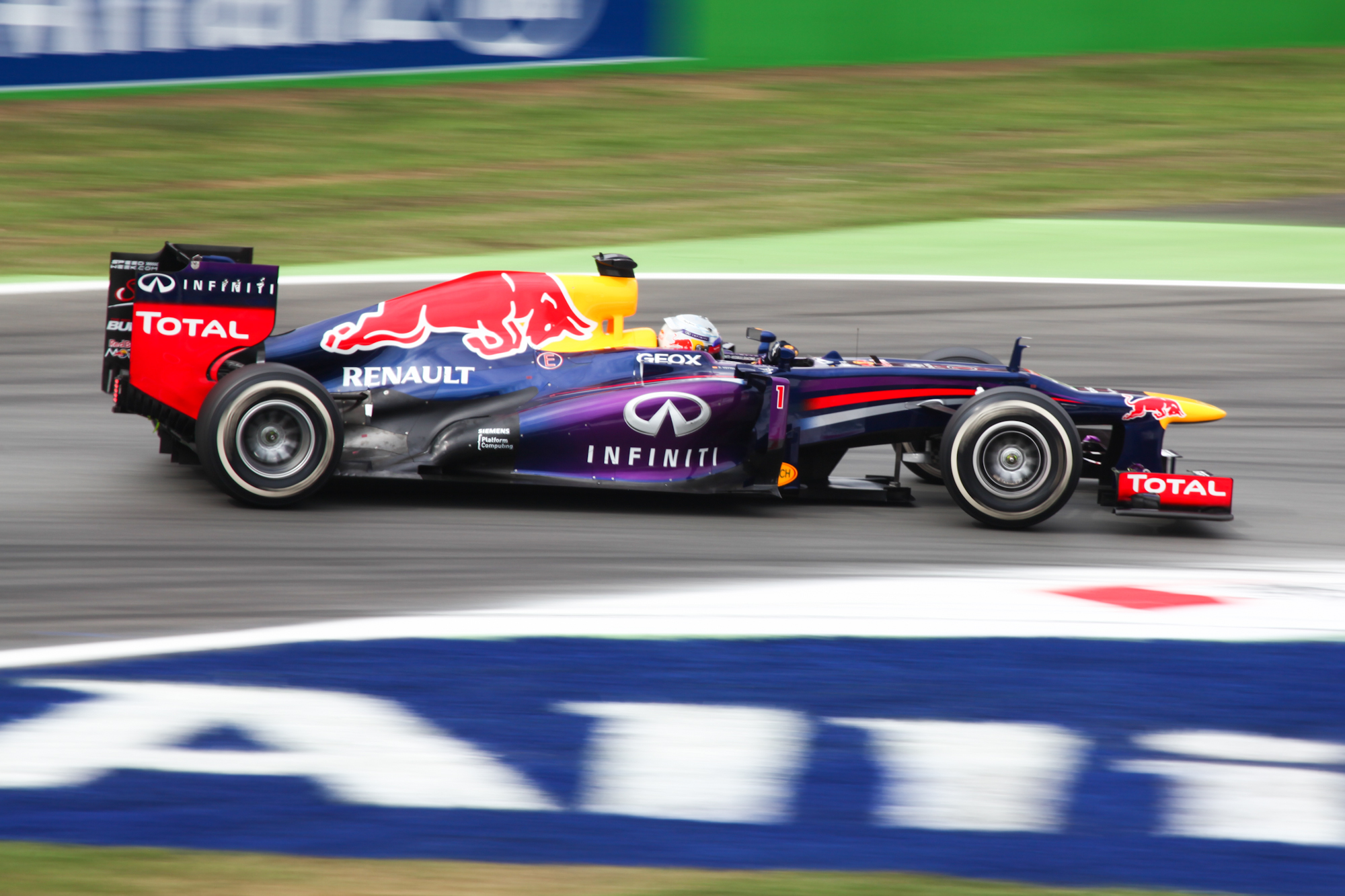
Vettel took the victory after starting from pole

Later on, Webber managed to leapfrog Massa during the pit stops. The impressive Nico Hülkenberg managed to stay in front of Nico Rosberg for a net fifth place, but the recovering Hamilton passed both Germans at Curva Biassono and at Variante del Rettifilo respectively, though the Briton had to stop again because of his earlier tire problem. Räikkönen was also recovering from his first-lap clash with Pérez, taking advantage of a battle between Esteban Gutiérrez and Adrian Sutil, although Hamilton passed the three of them after his second pit stop. The Briton then quickly caught the McLaren duo and overtook them almost as quickly. Räikkönen also overtook Pérez and went after Jenson Button for tenth and the last championship point.

At the end of his 52nd lap, Sutil pulled into the Force India garage and retired with a brake problem. He was classified 16th, as he had completed 90% of the winner's race distance. A lap later, Sebastian Vettel crossed the start/finish line to win the 2013 Italian Grand Prix, his sixth win of the season, ahead of Alonso and teammate Webber. Massa drove to a respectable fourth, while Hülkenberg successfully beat Rosberg to the flag for a strong fifth place. Daniel Ricciardo took advantage of the great top speed of his Toro Rosso to successfully fight off Grosjean for a solid seventh. Hamilton recovered from his slow puncture to pick up ninth, while Button managed to hold Räikkönen behind him for tenth.

== Classification ==
=== Qualifying ===
Pos.	No.	Driver	Constructor	Q1	Q2	Q3	Grid
1	1	(Germany) Sebastian Vettel	Red Bull-Renault	1:24.319	1:23.977	1:23.755	1
2	2	(Australia) Mark Webber	Red Bull-Renault	1:24.923	1:24.263	1:23.968	2
3	11	(Germany) Nico Hülkenberg	Sauber-Ferrari	1:24.776	1:24.305	1:24.065	3
4	4	(Brazil) Felipe Massa	Ferrari	1:24.950	1:24.479	1:24.132	4
5	3	(Spain) Fernando Alonso	Ferrari	1:24.661	1:24.227	1:24.142	5
6	9	(Germany) Nico Rosberg	Mercedes	1:24.527	1:24.393	1:24.192	6
7	19	(Australia) Daniel Ricciardo	Toro Rosso-Ferrari	1:24.655	1:24.290	1:24.209	7
8	6	(Mexico) Sergio Pérez	McLaren-Mercedes	1:24.635	1:24.592	1:24.502	8
9	5	(United Kingdom) Jenson Button	McLaren-Mercedes	1:24.739	1:24.563	1:24.515	9
10	18	(France) Jean-Éric Vergne	Toro Rosso-Ferrari	1:24.630	1:24.575	1:28.050	10
11	7	(Finland) Kimi Räikkönen	Lotus-Renault	1:24.819	1:24.610		11
12	10	(United Kingdom) Lewis Hamilton	Mercedes	1:24.589	1:24.803		12
13	8	(France) Romain Grosjean	Lotus-Renault	1:24.737	1:24.848		13
14	15	(Germany) Adrian Sutil	Force India-Mercedes	1:25.030	1:24.932		17^{1}
15	16	(Venezuela) Pastor Maldonado	Williams-Renault	1:24.905	1:25.011		14
16	14	(United Kingdom) Paul di Resta	Force India-Mercedes	1:25.009	1:25.077		15
17	12	(Mexico) Esteban Gutiérrez	Sauber-Ferrari	1:25.226			16
18	17	(Finland) Valtteri Bottas	Williams-Renault	1:25.291			18
19	21	(Netherlands) Giedo van der Garde	Caterham-Renault	1:26.406			19
20	20	(France) Charles Pic	Caterham-Renault	1:26.563			20
21	22	(France) Jules Bianchi	Marussia-Cosworth	1:27.085			21
22	23	(United Kingdom) Max Chilton	Marussia-Cosworth	1:27.480			22
107% time:1:30.221

Notes:

- ^1 — Adrian Sutil was given a three-place grid penalty for blocking Lewis Hamilton.

=== Race ===
Pos.	No.	Driver	Constructor	Laps	Time/Retired	Grid	Points
1	1	(Germany) Sebastian Vettel	Red Bull-Renault	53	1:18:33.352	1	25
2	3	(Spain) Fernando Alonso	Ferrari	53	+5.467	5	18
3	2	(Australia) Mark Webber	Red Bull-Renault	53	+6.350	2	15
4	4	(Brazil) Felipe Massa	Ferrari	53	+9.361	4	12
5	11	(Germany) Nico Hülkenberg	Sauber-Ferrari	53	+10.355	3	10
6	9	(Germany) Nico Rosberg	Mercedes	53	+10.999	6	8
7	19	(Australia) Daniel Ricciardo	Toro Rosso-Ferrari	53	+32.329	7	6
8	8	(France) Romain Grosjean	Lotus-Renault	53	+33.130	13	4
9	10	(United Kingdom) Lewis Hamilton	Mercedes	53	+33.527	12	2
10	5	(United Kingdom) Jenson Button	McLaren-Mercedes	53	+38.327	9	1
11	7	(Finland) Kimi Räikkönen	Lotus-Renault	53	+38.695	11	
12	6	(Mexico) Sergio Pérez	McLaren-Mercedes	53	+39.765	8	
13	12	(Mexico) Esteban Gutiérrez	Sauber-Ferrari	53	+40.880	16	
14	16	(Venezuela) Pastor Maldonado	Williams-Renault	53	+49.085	14	
15	17	(Finland) Valtteri Bottas	Williams-Renault	53	+56.827	18	
16	15	(Germany) Adrian Sutil	Force India-Mercedes	52	Brakes	17	
17	20	(France) Charles Pic	Caterham-Renault	52	+1 Lap	20	
18	21	(Netherlands) Giedo van der Garde	Caterham-Renault	52	+1 Lap	19	
19	22	(France) Jules Bianchi	Marussia-Cosworth	52	+1 Lap	21	
20	23	(United Kingdom) Max Chilton	Marussia-Cosworth	52	+1 Lap	22	
Ret	18	(France) Jean-Éric Vergne	Toro Rosso-Ferrari	14	Transmission	10	
Ret	14	(United Kingdom) Paul di Resta	Force India–Mercedes	0	Collision	15	

== Championship standings after the race ==
Drivers' Championship standings

Pos.	Driver	Points
1	(Germany) Sebastian Vettel	222
2	(Spain) Fernando Alonso	169
3	(United Kingdom) Lewis Hamilton	141
4	(Finland) Kimi Räikkönen	134
5	(Australia) Mark Webber	130

Constructors' Championship standings

	Pos.	Constructor	Points
	1	(Austria) Red Bull-Renault	352
1	2	(Italy) Ferrari	248
1	3	(Germany) Mercedes	245
	4	(United Kingdom) Lotus-Renault	191
	5	(United Kingdom) McLaren-Mercedes	66

- Note: Only the top five positions are included for both sets of standings.

== See also ==
- 2013 Monza GP2 Series round
- 2013 Monza GP3 Series round

Previous race: 2013 Belgian Grand Prix	FIA Formula One World Championship; 2013 season	Next race: 2013 Singapore Grand Prix
Previous race: 2012 Italian Grand Prix	Italian Grand Prix	Next race: 2014 Italian Grand Prix
