= 2013 Japanese Grand Prix =

Race 15 of 19 in the 2013 Formula One World Championship
← Previous race	Next race →
- Suzuka Circuit

Race details
- Date: 13 October 2013
- Official name: 2013 Formula 1 Japanese Grand Prix
- Location: Suzuka Circuit; Suzuka, Japan
- Course: Permanent racing facility
- Course length: 5.807 km (3.608 miles)
- Distance: 53 laps, 307.471 km (191.054 miles)
- Weather: Warm and sunny
- Attendance: 171,000

Pole position
Driver	(Australia) Mark Webber	Red Bull-Renault
- Time: 1:30.915

Fastest lap
Driver	(Australia) Mark Webber	Red Bull-Renault
- Time: 1:34.587 on lap 44

Podium
First	(Germany) Sebastian Vettel	Red Bull-Renault
Second	(Australia) Mark Webber	Red Bull-Renault
Third	(France) Romain Grosjean	Lotus-Renault

The 2013 Japanese Grand Prix (formally known as the 2013 Formula 1 Japanese Grand Prix) was a Formula One motor race that was held on 13 October 2013 at the Suzuka Circuit in Suzuka, Japan. The race was the fifteenth round of the 2013 season, and marked the 39th running of the Japanese Grand Prix. The race, contested over 53 laps, was won by Sebastian Vettel, driving a Red Bull after starting from second on the grid. Mark Webber, who started on pole position, settled for second after being forced to switch to a three stop strategy, which in the end was not successful. Romain Grosjean took his second podium in succession in third position for Lotus F1. This was Red Bull's 14th one-two finish in Formula One.

The result meant that the title was not sealed at Suzuka but Vettel could win the title with fifth place at the next race in India. Meanwhile, Fernando Alonso stretched his lead to 30 points over Kimi Räikkönen but was still 90 behind Vettel's total. Räikkönen in turn also increased his lead over Lewis Hamilton to 16 points after the Briton retired from puncture damage after colliding with Vettel on lap one. The result also meant that only Alonso could deprive Vettel of becoming world champion as Hamilton and Räikkönen fell out of contention.

== Report ==
=== Background ===
Tyre supplier Pirelli brought its Orange-banded hard compound tyre as the harder "prime" tyre and the White-banded Medium compound tyre as the softer "option" tyre, as opposed to the previous year where hard and soft selection were provided. Jules Bianchi and Charles Pic were each given ten-place grid penalties after stewards found they had been speeding behind the safety car at the previous round in Korea. Both drivers were reprimanded for their actions, and automatically received a ten-place grid penalty as it was their third reprimand of the season.

=== Free practice ===
Free Practice 1 saw Heikki Kovalainen drive for Caterham, in place of Charles Pic. The session was not without incident, as both Jules Bianchi (Marussia), Giedo van der Garde (Caterham) both went off at the exit of the second Degner corner. As a result of his accident, Bianchi was forced to sit out of Free Practice 2, while his car was repaired. Pastor Maldonado suffered a loose wheel up at Spoon Curve. Williams were later fined €60,000 for failing to attach the wheel properly. Lewis Hamilton set the fastest lap of the session, with teammate Nico Rosberg behind him.

Free Practice 2 saw Pastor Maldonado also going off at the second Degner corner, where he became stuck in the gravel. Sergio Pérez lost control of his McLaren going into Spoon, and slid backwards and made heavy contact with the tyre barrier. Fernando Alonso spun at the second Degner corner, but he was able to continue. Kimi Räikkönen spun into the gravel trap at the Dunlop corner and was forced to end his session. This time championship leader Sebastian Vettel finished the session fastest, with teammate Mark Webber behind him.

=== Qualifying ===
In a first, Charles Pic was given a drive-through penalty for leaving the pits when the red light was displayed at the pit exit during qualifying. The penalty was to be served during the first five laps of the race.

=== Race ===
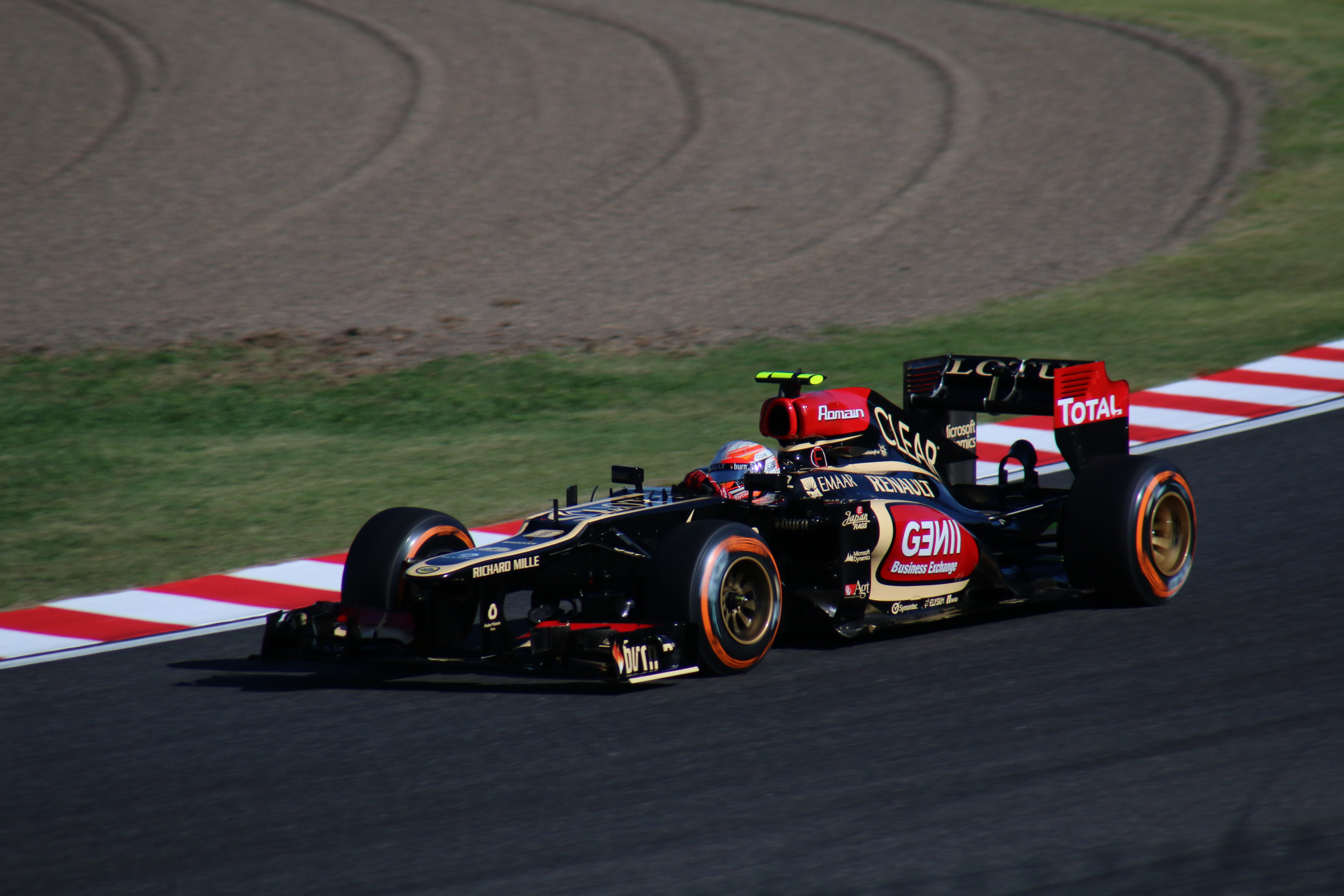
Lotus' Grosjean finished third after leading the race at one point

At the start, Romain Grosjean made a superb start to lead into the first corner, behind him there was drama with Sebastian Vettel making contact with Lewis Hamilton causing the latter to have a puncture, also there was a collision between the Marussia of Jules Bianchi and the Caterham of Giedo van der Garde sending both cars into the barriers at the first corner, fortunately both cars were removed quickly so no safety car was needed. Hamilton pitted to change his punctured tyre but retired on lap 7 with floor damage. Grosjean led until the pit stops but careful tyre management from Vettel during the second phase of the race meant he was able to pass Grosjean and go on to win the race. On the penultimate lap Mark Webber then caught and passed Grosjean to make it a Red Bull 1–2, with Grosjean having to settle for 3rd. Fernando Alonso claimed 4th with Nico Hülkenberg in fifth. Kimi Räikkönen managed 6th although he was some 40 seconds behind his teammate Grosjean. Esteban Gutierrez had the strongest race of his career with 7th beating Nico Rosberg who had to serve a drive through penalty for an unsafe release in the pits.

== Classification ==
=== Qualifying ===
Pos.	No.	Driver	Constructor	Q1	Q2	Q3	Grid
1	2	(Australia) Mark Webber	Red Bull-Renault	1:32.271	1:31.513	1:30.915	1
2	1	(Germany) Sebastian Vettel	Red Bull-Renault	1:32.397	1:31.290	1:31.089	2
3	10	(United Kingdom) Lewis Hamilton	Mercedes	1:32.340	1:31.636	1:31.253	3
4	8	(France) Romain Grosjean	Lotus-Renault	1:31.824	1:31.565	1:31.365	4
5	4	(Brazil) Felipe Massa	Ferrari	1:31.994	1:31.668	1:31.378	5
6	9	(Germany) Nico Rosberg	Mercedes	1:32.244	1:31.764	1:31.397	6
7	11	(Germany) Nico Hülkenberg	Sauber-Ferrari	1:32.465	1:31.848	1:31.664	7
8	3	(Spain) Fernando Alonso	Ferrari	1:32.371	1:31.828	1:31.665	8
9	7	(Finland) Kimi Räikkönen	Lotus-Renault	1:32.377	1:31.662	1:31.684	9
10	5	(United Kingdom) Jenson Button	McLaren-Mercedes	1:32.606	1:31.838	1:31.827	10
11	6	(Mexico) Sergio Pérez	McLaren-Mercedes	1:32.718	1:31.989		11
12	14	(United Kingdom) Paul di Resta	Force India-Mercedes	1:32.286	1:31.992		12
13	17	(Finland) Valtteri Bottas	Williams-Renault	1:32.613	1:32.013		13
14	12	(Mexico) Esteban Gutiérrez	Sauber-Ferrari	1:32.673	1:32.063		14
15	16	(Venezuela) Pastor Maldonado	Williams-Renault	1:32.875	1:32.093		15
16	19	(Australia) Daniel Ricciardo	Toro Rosso-Ferrari	1:32.804	1:32.485		16
17	15	(Germany) Adrian Sutil	Force India-Mercedes	1:32.890			22^{1}
18	18	(France) Jean-Éric Vergne	Toro Rosso-Ferrari	1:33.357			17
19	23	(United Kingdom) Max Chilton	Marussia-Cosworth	1:34.320			18
20	20	(France) Charles Pic	Caterham-Renault	1:34.556			20^{2}
21	21	(Netherlands) Giedo van der Garde	Caterham-Renault	1:34.879			19
22	22	(France) Jules Bianchi	Marussia-Cosworth	1:34.958			21^{2}
107% time: 1:38.251

Notes:
^1 — Adrian Sutil received a five-place grid penalty for a gearbox change. However, he chose to be demoted two-five places for causing a deliberate accident at the previous race.
^2 — Charles Pic and Jules Bianchi received ten-place grid penalties for receiving three reprimands over the season. However, due to Sutil's grid penalty Pic and Bianchi were promoted to 20th and 21st respectively.

=== Race ===
Pos.	No.	Driver	Constructor	Laps	Time/Retired	Grid	Points
1	1	(Germany) Sebastian Vettel	Red Bull-Renault	53	1:26:49.301	2	25
2	2	(Australia) Mark Webber	Red Bull-Renault	53	+7.129	1	18
3	8	(France) Romain Grosjean	Lotus-Renault	53	+9.910	4	15
4	3	(Spain) Fernando Alonso	Ferrari	53	+45.605	8	12
5	7	(Finland) Kimi Räikkönen	Lotus-Renault	53	+47.325	9	10
6	11	(Germany) Nico Hülkenberg	Sauber-Ferrari	53	+51.615	7	8
7	12	(Mexico) Esteban Gutiérrez	Sauber-Ferrari	53	+1:11.630	14	6
8	9	(Germany) Nico Rosberg	Mercedes	53	+1:12.023	6	4
9	5	(United Kingdom) Jenson Button	McLaren-Mercedes	53	+1:20.821	10	2
10	4	(Brazil) Felipe Massa	Ferrari	53	+1:29.263	5	1
11	14	(United Kingdom) Paul di Resta	Force India-Mercedes	53	+1:38.572	12	
12	18	(France) Jean-Éric Vergne	Toro Rosso-Ferrari	52	+1 Lap	17	
13	19	(Australia) Daniel Ricciardo	Toro Rosso-Ferrari	52	+1 Lap	16	
14	15	(Germany) Adrian Sutil	Force India-Mercedes	52	+1 Lap	22	
15	6	(Mexico) Sergio Pérez	McLaren-Mercedes	52	+1 Lap	11	
16	16	(Venezuela) Pastor Maldonado	Williams-Renault	52	+1 Lap	15	
17	17	(Finland) Valtteri Bottas	Williams-Renault	52	+1 Lap	13	
18	20	(France) Charles Pic	Caterham-Renault	52	+1 Lap	20	
19	23	(United Kingdom) Max Chilton	Marussia-Cosworth	52	+1 Lap	18	
Ret	10	(United Kingdom) Lewis Hamilton	Mercedes	7	Collision damage	3	
Ret	21	(Netherlands) Giedo van der Garde	Caterham-Renault	0	Collision	19	
Ret	22	(France) Jules Bianchi	Marussia-Cosworth	0	Collision	21	

== Championship standings after the race ==
Drivers' Championship standings

Pos.	Driver	Points
1	(Germany) Sebastian Vettel*	297
2	(Spain) Fernando Alonso*	207
3	(Finland) Kimi Räikkönen	177
4	(United Kingdom) Lewis Hamilton	161
5	(Australia) Mark Webber	148

Constructors' Championship standings

Pos.	Constructor	Points
1	(Austria) Red Bull-Renault*	445
2	(Italy) Ferrari*	297
3	(Germany) Mercedes*	287
4	(United Kingdom) Lotus-Renault	264
5	(United Kingdom) McLaren-Mercedes	83

- Note: Only the top five positions are included for both sets of standings.
- Bold text and an asterisk shows drivers or teams that still had a mathematical chance of winning the championship.

Previous race: 2013 Korean Grand Prix	FIA Formula One World Championship; 2013 season	Next race: 2013 Indian Grand Prix
Previous race: 2012 Japanese Grand Prix	Japanese Grand Prix	Next race: 2014 Japanese Grand Prix
