= 2013 Formula One World Championship =

Motor racing championship

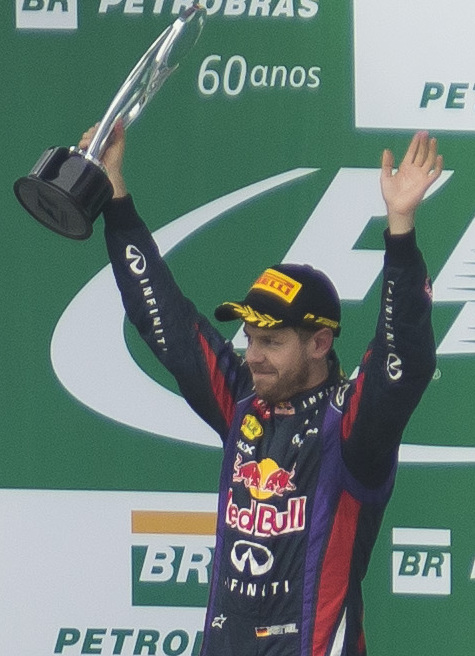
Sebastian Vettel won his fourth consecutive and final Championship with Red Bull Racing.

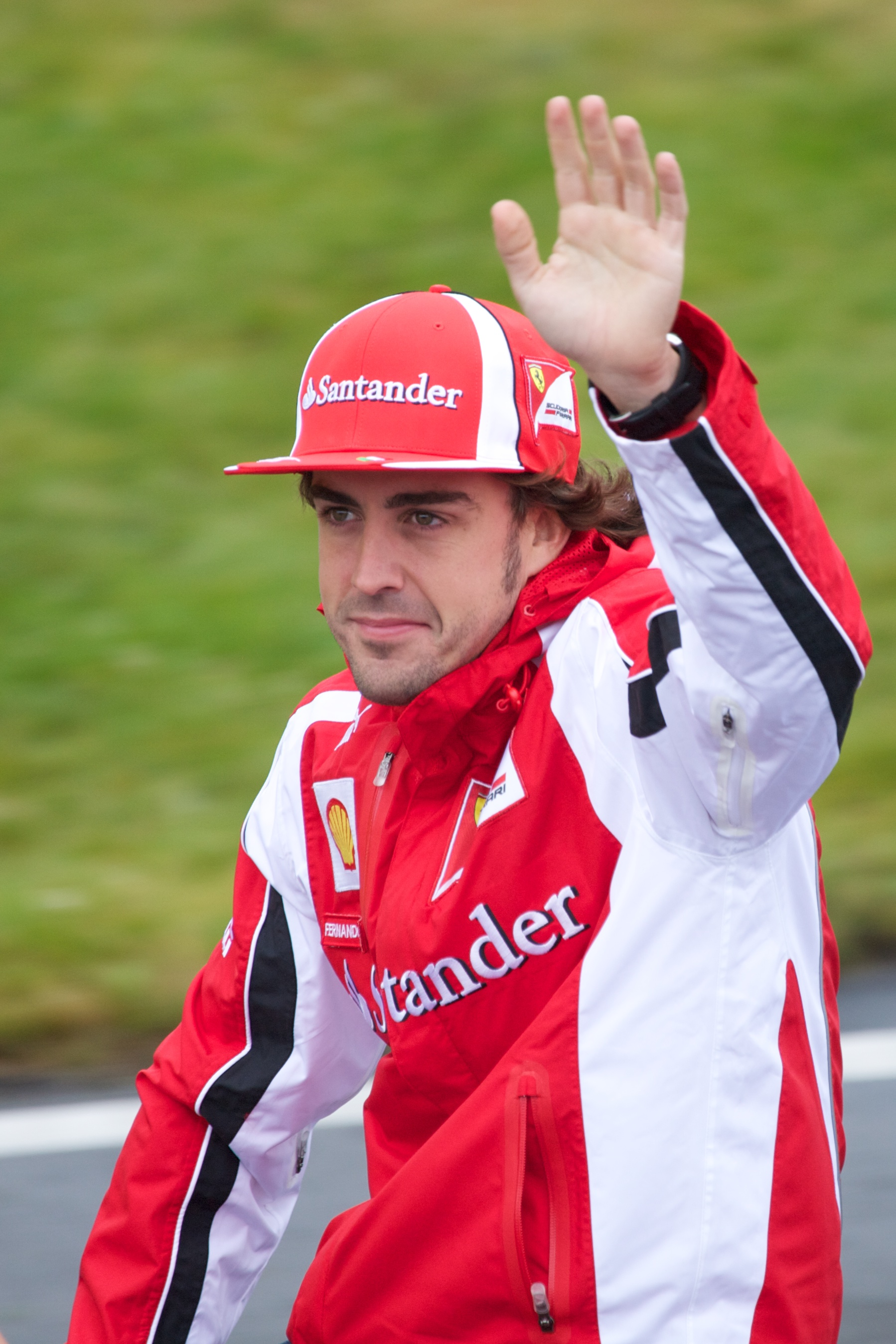
Two-time Champion Fernando Alonso (pictured in 2011) finished runner-up, driving for Ferrari.

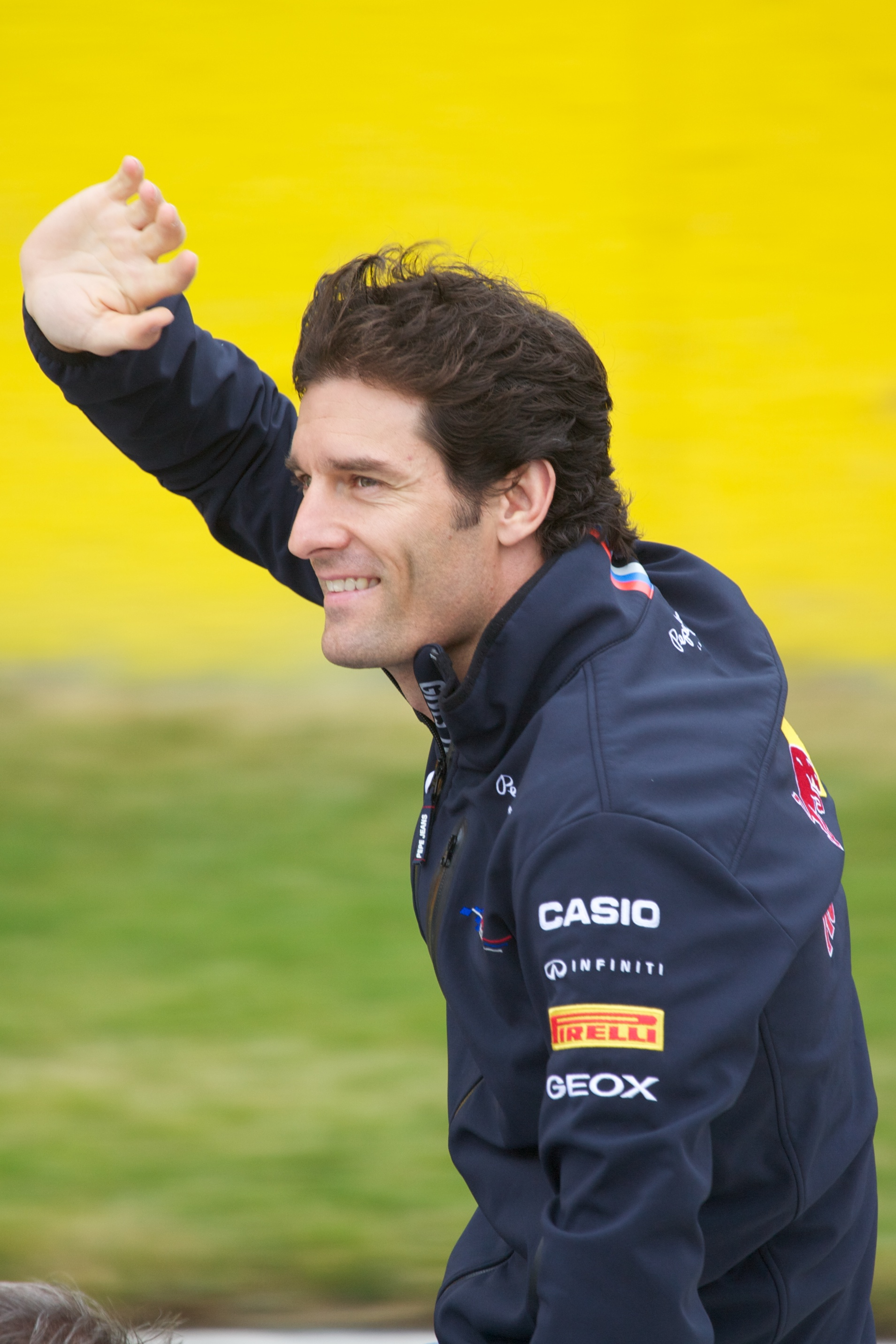
Vettel's teammate Mark Webber finished third, in his final season in Formula One.

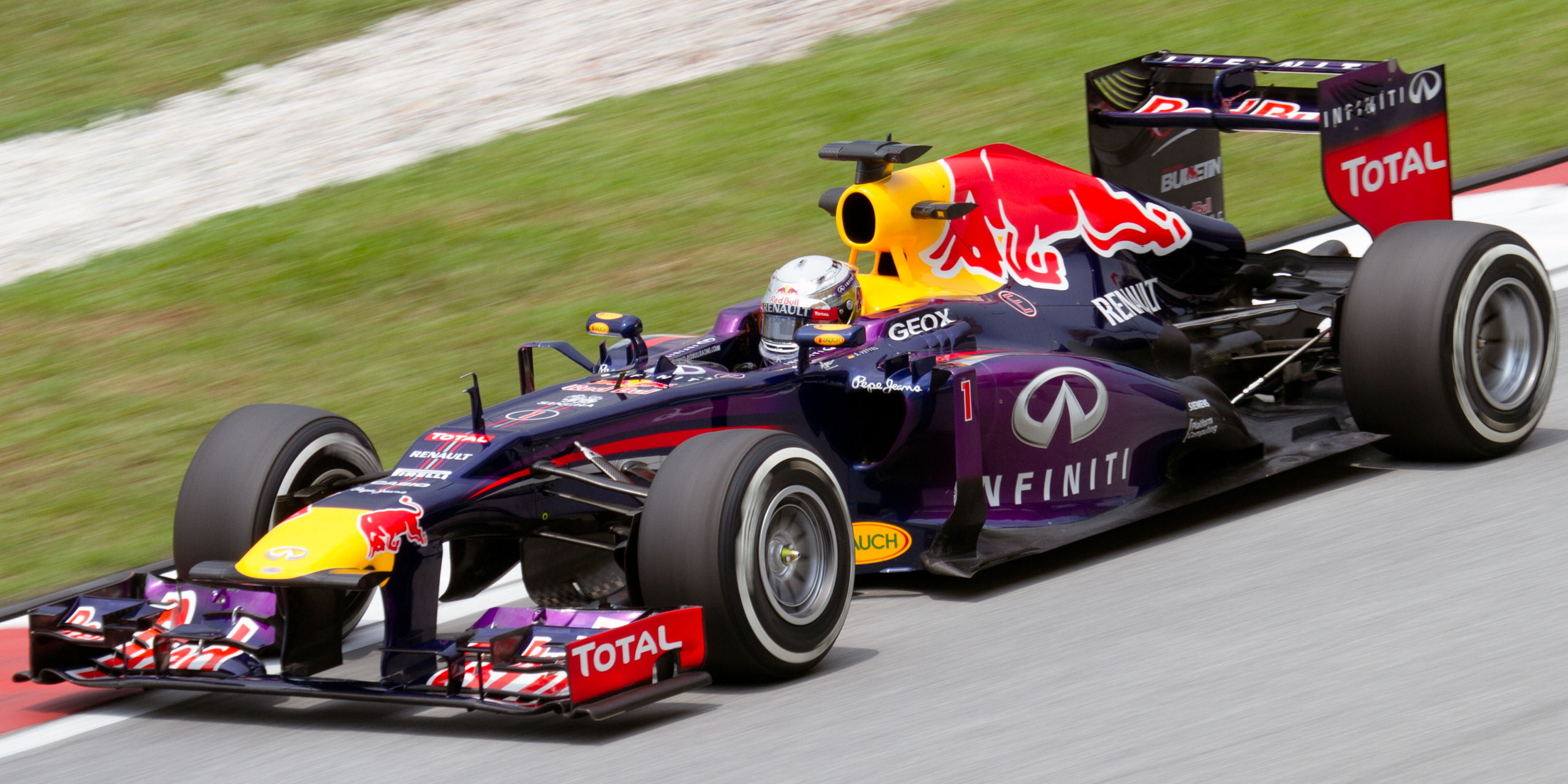
Red Bull Racing won their fourth consecutive Constructors' Championship with the Red Bull RB9.

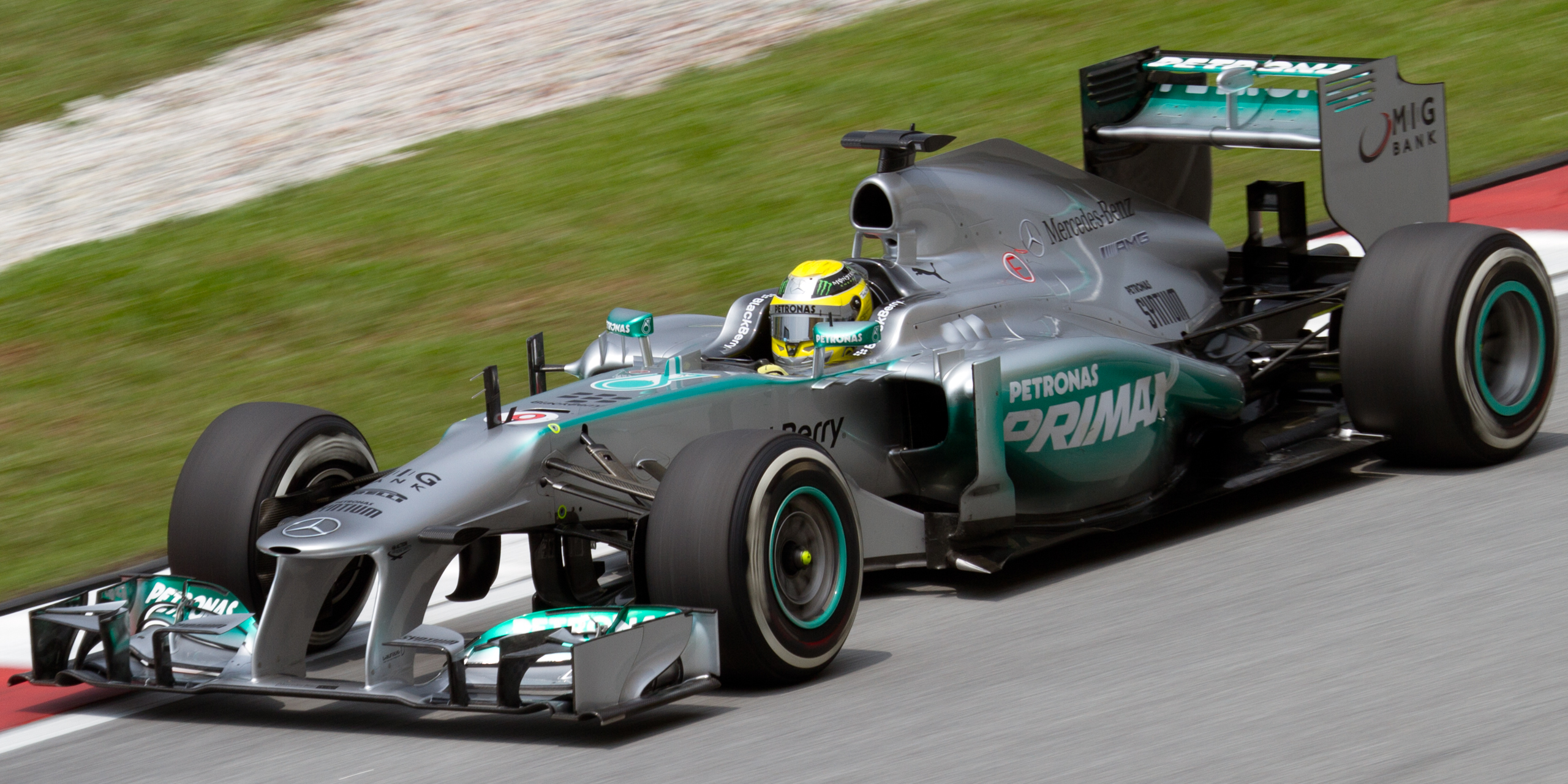
Mercedes finished second in the Constructors' Championship with the Mercedes F1 W04.

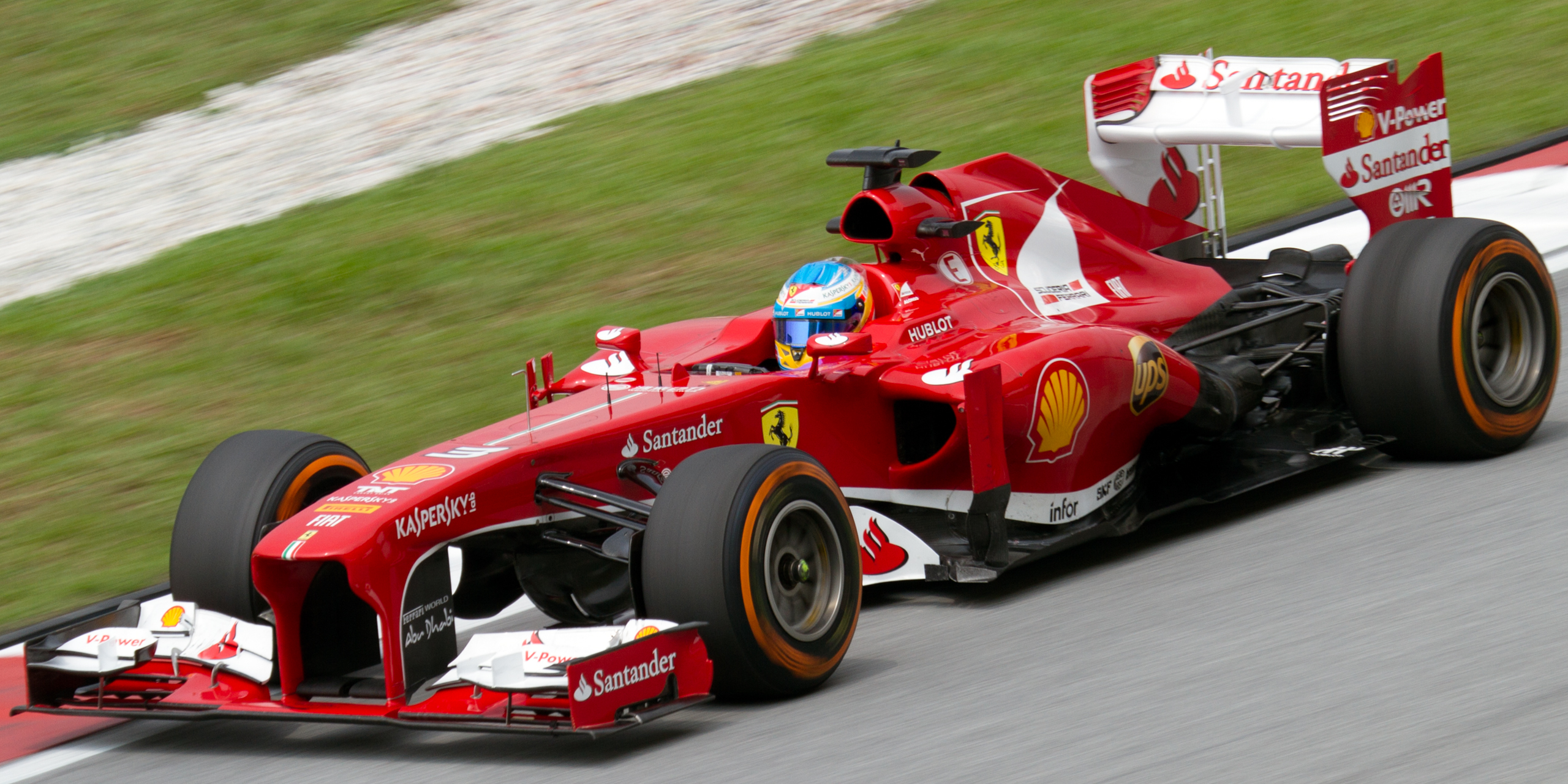
Ferrari finished third in the Constructors' Championship with the Ferrari F138.

The 2013 FIA Formula One World Championship was the 67th season of FIA Formula One motor racing. It featured the 64th FIA Formula One World Championship, a motor racing series for Formula One cars, recognised by the Fédération Internationale de l'Automobile (FIA) – the governing body of motorsport – as the highest class of competition for open-wheel racing cars. Eleven teams and twenty-three drivers contested the nineteen Grands Prix that made up the calendar for the 2013 season, with the winning driver being crowned the World Drivers' Champion and the winning team the World Constructors' Champions. The season started in Australia on 17 March 2013 and ended in Brazil on 24 November 2013.

The 2013 season was the final year the series used the 2.4-litre V8 engine configuration which was introduced in 2006 and for naturally-aspirated engines in general having been mandatory since 1989 as a 1.6-litre turbocharged hybrid V6 engine formula came into force for 2014. It was also the last season where engine manufacturer Cosworth competed in the sport.

Sebastian Vettel successfully defended his World Championship, winning his fourth consecutive title in the fourth to last race of 2013. In doing so he became the third driver in Formula One's sixty-four years to win four consecutive World Drivers' Championships. It was one of the most dominant championship victories in the sport and the last won by a Red Bull driver until 2021 with Max Verstappen, it remains the last for a Renault-powered driver, as of October 2025. Vettel won the championship by a then-record 155 points, which was broken 10 years later by Max Verstappen. Vettel's 2013 season performance additionally saw him recognised by the Laureus World Sports Awards as the Sportsman of the Year, the second racing driver to be so recognised. He became the fourth driver to win at least four titles along with Alain Prost, Juan Manuel Fangio and Michael Schumacher.

Vettel tied Schumacher's season record of 13 race wins and closed out the year with nine consecutive victories. 2013 would turn out to be the end of his title run, with Vettel remaining at four titles until his retirement in 2022. Fernando Alonso finished second in the championship for Ferrari for the third time in four seasons, which would also be the last time he would win a race or end up on the championship podium for at least nine years. Vettel's team Red Bull Racing, with the assistance of his teammate Mark Webber, successfully defended their World Constructors' Championship at the same race as their lead driver secured his title. Webber, who competed in his final season in Formula One, finished third before announcing his retirement having amassed nine Grand Prix wins across his twelve seasons in Formula One.

This was also the last year that the largely Constructors' Championship-based car numbering system introduced in 1996 was used. From 2014 drivers would be allowed to pick a permanent car number between 2 and 99 for their whole career.

== Teams and drivers ==
The following teams and drivers were contracted to drive in the 2013 season, following ratification of a new Concorde Agreement. At the 2012 Malaysian Grand Prix, Bernie Ecclestone announced that the "majority" of teams competing in the 2012 season had agreed to compete in 2013, though he gave no indication of which teams—if any—were offering resistance to the new Concorde Agreement. At the 2012 British Grand Prix, Ecclestone announced that every team had agreed "in principle" to the terms of the new Concorde Agreement, and the final draft of the Concorde Agreement was presented to the teams ahead of the 2012 Indian Grand Prix.

On 30 November 2012, the FIA published a provisional entry list for the 2013 season. The final entry list was published on 3 March 2013. All teams competed with tyres supplied by Pirelli.

Entrant	Constructor	Chassis	Engine	No.	Race drivers	Rounds
(Austria) Infiniti Red Bull Racing Renault	Red Bull Racing-Renault	RB9	Renault RS27-2013	1	(Germany) Sebastian Vettel	All
(Austria) Infiniti Red Bull Racing Renault	Red Bull Racing-Renault	RB9	Renault RS27-2013	2	(Australia) Mark Webber	All
(Italy) Scuderia Ferrari	Ferrari	F138	Ferrari Type 056	3	(Spain) Fernando Alonso	All
(Italy) Scuderia Ferrari	Ferrari	F138	Ferrari Type 056	4	(Brazil) Felipe Massa	All
(United Kingdom) Vodafone McLaren Mercedes	McLaren-Mercedes	MP4-28	Mercedes FO 108F	5	(United Kingdom) Jenson Button	All
(United Kingdom) Vodafone McLaren Mercedes	McLaren-Mercedes	MP4-28	Mercedes FO 108F	6	(Mexico) Sergio Pérez	All
(United Kingdom) Lotus F1 Team	Lotus-Renault	E21	Renault RS27-2013	7	(Finland) Kimi Räikkönen	1–17
(United Kingdom) Lotus F1 Team	Lotus-Renault	E21	Renault RS27-2013	7	(Finland) Heikki Kovalainen	18–19
(United Kingdom) Lotus F1 Team	Lotus-Renault	E21	Renault RS27-2013	8	(France) Romain Grosjean	All
(Germany) Mercedes AMG Petronas F1 Team	Mercedes	F1 W04	Mercedes FO 108F	9	(Germany) Nico Rosberg	All
(Germany) Mercedes AMG Petronas F1 Team	Mercedes	F1 W04	Mercedes FO 108F	10	(United Kingdom) Lewis Hamilton	All
(Switzerland) Sauber F1 Team	Sauber-Ferrari	C32	Ferrari Type 056	11	(Germany) Nico Hülkenberg	All
(Switzerland) Sauber F1 Team	Sauber-Ferrari	C32	Ferrari Type 056	12	(Mexico) Esteban Gutiérrez	All
Sahara Force India F1 Team	Force India-Mercedes	VJM06	Mercedes FO 108F	14	(United Kingdom) Paul di Resta	All
Sahara Force India F1 Team	Force India-Mercedes	VJM06	Mercedes FO 108F	15	(Germany) Adrian Sutil	All
(United Kingdom) Williams F1 Team	Williams-Renault	FW35	Renault RS27-2013	16	(Venezuela) Pastor Maldonado	All
(United Kingdom) Williams F1 Team	Williams-Renault	FW35	Renault RS27-2013	17	(Finland) Valtteri Bottas	All
(Italy) Scuderia Toro Rosso	Toro Rosso-Ferrari	STR8	Ferrari Type 056	18	(France) Jean-Éric Vergne	All
(Italy) Scuderia Toro Rosso	Toro Rosso-Ferrari	STR8	Ferrari Type 056	19	(Australia) Daniel Ricciardo	All
(Malaysia) Caterham F1 Team	Caterham-Renault	CT03	Renault RS27-2013	20	(France) Charles Pic	All
(Malaysia) Caterham F1 Team	Caterham-Renault	CT03	Renault RS27-2013	21	(Netherlands) Giedo van der Garde	All
(Russia) Marussia F1 Team	Marussia-Cosworth	MR02	Cosworth CA2013	22	(France) Jules Bianchi	All
(Russia) Marussia F1 Team	Marussia-Cosworth	MR02	Cosworth CA2013	23	(United Kingdom) Max Chilton	All

=== Free practice drivers ===
Six drivers participated in free practice sessions as third or test drivers.

Drivers that took part in free practice sessions
Constructor	Practice drivers	
Constructor	Driver name	Rounds
Caterham-Renault	(CHN) Ma Qinghua (Finland) Heikki Kovalainen (USA) Alexander Rossi	3; 4–5, 11–12, 15, 17; 7, 18
Force India-Mercedes	(UK) James Calado	12, 14, 16–17, 19
Marussia-Cosworth	(Venezuela) Rodolfo González	4–5, 9–10, 12, 14, 17–19
Toro Rosso-Ferrari	(Russia) Daniil Kvyat	18–19

=== Team changes ===
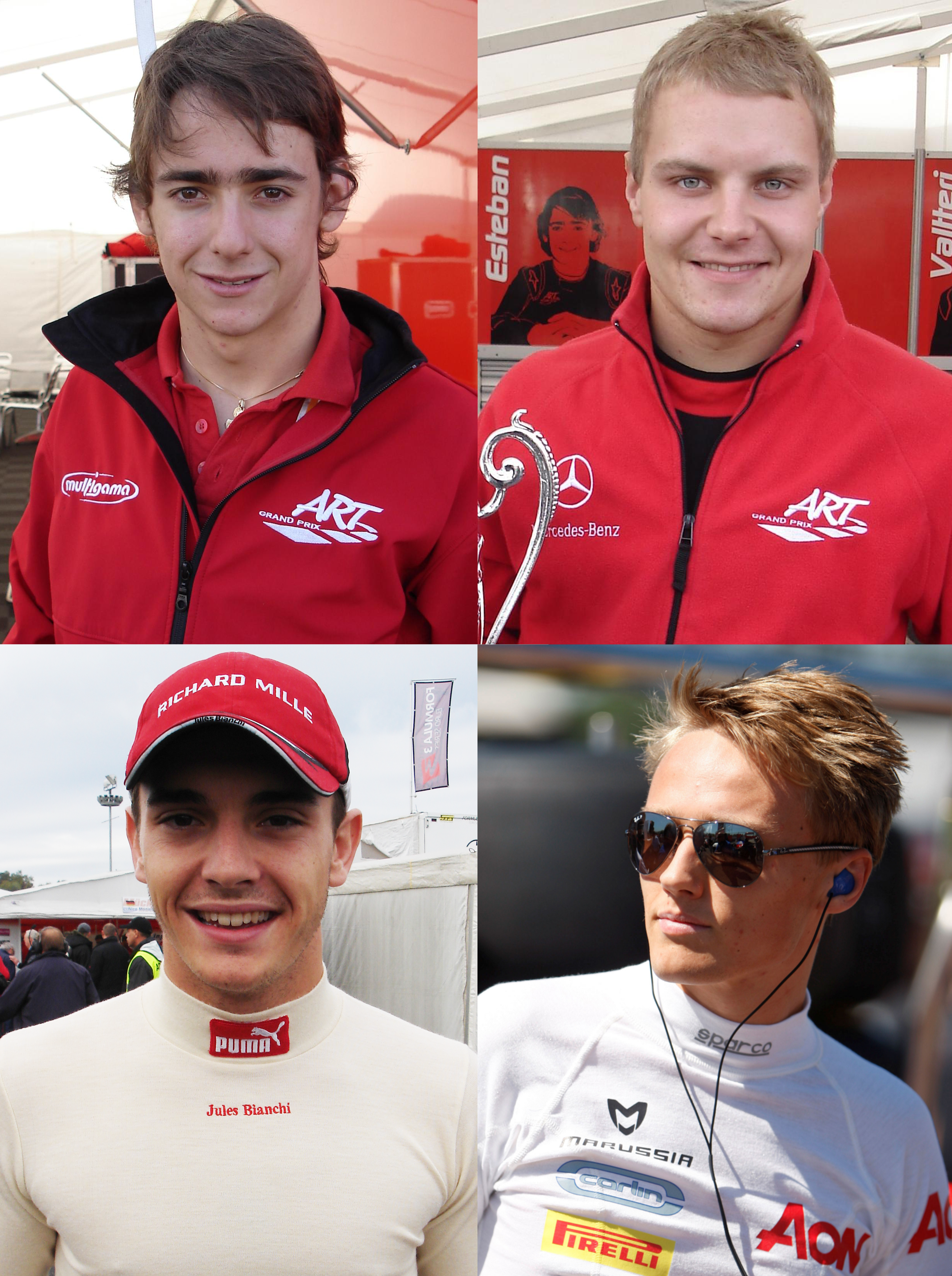
Five drivers made their Formula One debut in 2013, including (clockwise from top left): Esteban Gutiérrez (Sauber), Valtteri Bottas (Williams), Max Chilton and Jules Bianchi (both Marussia). Giedo van der Garde (Caterham) is not pictured.

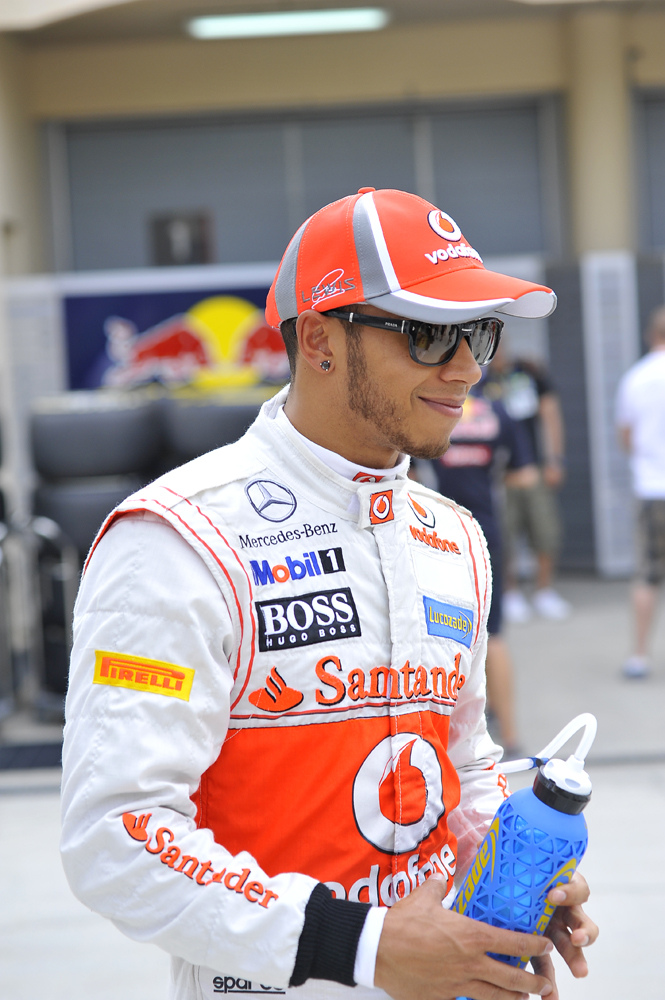
Lewis Hamilton—seen here at the 2012 Bahrain Grand Prix—left McLaren to join the Mercedes works team in 2013.

In November 2012, Thesan Capital, the owners of HRT Formula 1 Team, announced that they were putting the team up for sale. The team needed to find a buyer by 30 November—the date by which entry fees for the 2013 were due to be paid—or else face closure and a departure from the sport. Thesan Capital failed to find a buyer in time, and HRT was omitted from the 2013 entry list. The team was later reported to be in liquidation, and despite bids to purchase and revive the team under a new name, their assets were ultimately sold to Teo Martín, the owner of a firm specialising in recycling automotive parts.

=== Driver changes ===
Upon starting his second career in 2010, Michael Schumacher signed a three-year agreement to race for Mercedes AMG. With that deal expiring at the end of the 2012 season, Schumacher was given the option of renewing his contract with the team for 2013. However, in the face of disappointing results over the past three seasons, Schumacher became indecisive about his future, prompting Mercedes to start searching for a new driver. Following a protracted period of negotiation, 2008 World Champion Lewis Hamilton announced that he would join Mercedes for the next three years. The move ended his fourteen-year association with McLaren, and Hamilton later described his decision to change teams as being motivated by the desire to find a new challenge for himself, and that the idea of taking a struggling team and building them up to become a successful one held more appeal to him than "cruising around with a great team". Schumacher ultimately announced that he would be retiring from the sport for the second time at the end of the 2012 season.

With Hamilton leaving McLaren, the team sought out Sauber driver Sergio Pérez to replace him. Pérez was previously a member of the Ferrari Driver Academy, and was considered to be the leading candidate to join Ferrari should a vacant seat become available, but said that although he had talked with the team, he had never considered racing for them to be a realistic proposition, adding that McLaren was the best place for him to go.

Nico Hülkenberg left Force India after just one season, despite having originally signed a multi-year deal to race for the team starting in 2012, to fill the vacant seat at Sauber. Hülkenberg was joined by Esteban Gutiérrez, who had previously served as Sauber's testing and reserve driver in 2011 and 2012 whilst campaigning in the GP2 Series. Hülkenberg's place at Force India was taken by Adrian Sutil, who returned to the team after a season out of the sport.

With Hülkenberg and Gutiérrez joining Sauber, Kamui Kobayashi was left without a seat after three seasons with the Swiss team. In a bid to secure a seat, Kobayashi accepted donations from fans to raise as much money as possible. However, shortly after Lotus F1 announced that they would retain Romain Grosjean, Kobayashi announced that he had given up hope of securing a racing seat for the 2013 season. He later joined AF Corse for the 2013 FIA World Endurance Championship. However, he returned to the Formula 1 grid in 2014 with Caterham.

Williams promoted test and reserve driver Valtteri Bottas to a full-time racing seat alongside Pastor Maldonado, replacing Bruno Senna. Bottas, the 2011 GP3 Series champion, made regular appearances for Williams during the 2012 season, in official practice sessions at fifteen Grands Prix. Faced with the loss of his seat, Bruno Senna initially sought a drive with Force India, but instead moved to the World Endurance Championship, joining Aston Martin Racing.

Charles Pic moved from Marussia to Caterham, joining former GP2 Series teammate Giedo van der Garde. Pic and van der Garde had previously raced alongside one another as teammates in 2011, racing for Barwa Addax. Where Pic joined Marussia for the 2012 season, van der Garde became Caterham's test driver and contested the 2012 GP2 Series with their GP2 team before being promoted to Formula One. As a result of this, Caterham's 2012 drivers, Heikki Kovalainen and Vitaly Petrov lost their seats for 2013. Caterham team principal Cyril Abiteboul later said that the relationship between the team and Kovalainen had fallen apart towards the end of the 2012 season, leading to his dismissal from the team, whilst Petrov lost his seat due to a lack of sponsorship. Kovalainen later returned to the team to take part in free practice sessions on a temporary basis.

Timo Glock was initially signed to compete for Marussia until the end of the 2014 season, but later announced that he would be leaving the team. Marussia team principal John Booth cited "tough economic conditions" as the reason for the team being forced to let Glock go, whilst Glock referenced the loss of tenth place in the 2012 World Constructors' Championship to Caterham at the 2012 Brazilian Grand Prix as the first sign that his position with the team was in danger. Glock moved to the Deutsche Tourenwagen Masters, driving for BMW. With Glock gone, the team elected to take two rookie drivers: Max Chilton, who spent the 2012 season competing in the GP2 Series with the Marussia-backed Carlin team; and GP2 Series runner-up Luiz Razia. However, Razia was removed from Marussia's testing line-up for the second pre-season test in Barcelona, leading to speculation that his future with the team was in jeopardy. It was later reported that his sponsors had missed payments to the team, prompting the decision to suspend his testing programme. His contract to race was terminated twenty-three days after it had been announced, and Razia was replaced by 2009 Formula 3 Euro Series champion and 2012 Formula Renault 3.5 Series runner-up Jules Bianchi.

With HRT withdrawing from the championship, Pedro de la Rosa and Narain Karthikeyan were left without full-time racing seats. De la Rosa later joined Ferrari to aid the team in developing their simulator and was confirmed as one of their test and reserve drivers before the first pre-season test in Jerez, while Karthikeyan began contesting Auto GP.

==== Mid-season changes ====
Kimi Räikkönen was forced to miss the final two races of the season in order to undergo surgery to relieve pain from a back injury he had been suffering from for a long time and which flared up during the Singapore Grand Prix. His place in the team was taken by fellow Finnish racer Heikki Kovalainen.

== Calendar ==
The following nineteen races appeared on the 2013 race schedule. Bernie Ecclestone, Formula One's commercial rights holder through his Formula One Management and Formula One Administration companies, has previously said that he believes twenty races is the maximum that is viable. The number of races on the Formula One calendar is dictated by the Concorde Agreement, the arrangement between teams, the FIA and Formula One Management. At the time of Ecclestone's comments regarding the length of the series schedule, the then-current Concorde Agreement was set to expire at the end of the 2012 season. Twenty to twenty-five races would be possible if the teams agreed to it.

At the 2012 Hungarian Grand Prix, Ecclestone announced that the 2013 calendar would consist of twenty races, and would be largely similar to the 2012 calendar. The provisional calendar was announced at the 2012 Singapore Grand Prix, which was approved by the FIA World Motor Sport Council on 28 September 2012.

The calendar was originally intended to host twenty races, with the inclusion of the Grand Prix of America, a new event to be hosted on the streets of New Jersey on 16 June, as part of a 1-week North American "double-header". Following its removal from the calendar, the schedule was reduced to nineteen races until the FIA World Motor Sport Council announced that a twentieth round would be included at a circuit in Europe, pending the outcome of negotiations between Bernie Ecclestone and event organisers. In February 2013, Ecclestone announced that a replacement venue had not been found, leaving the calendar at nineteen Grands Prix.

Round	Grand Prix	Circuit	Date
1	Australian Grand Prix	(Australia) Albert Park Circuit, Melbourne	17 March
2	Malaysian Grand Prix	(Malaysia) Sepang International Circuit, Kuala Lumpur	24 March
3	Chinese Grand Prix	(China) Shanghai International Circuit, Shanghai	14 April
4	Bahrain Grand Prix	Bahrain International Circuit, Sakhir	21 April
5	Spanish Grand Prix	(Spain) Circuit de Catalunya, Montmeló	12 May
6	Monaco Grand Prix	Circuit de Monaco, Monte Carlo	26 May
7	Canadian Grand Prix	(Canada) Circuit Gilles Villeneuve, Montreal	9 June
8	British Grand Prix	(United Kingdom) Silverstone Circuit, Silverstone	30 June
9	German Grand Prix	(Germany) Nürburgring, Nürburg	7 July
10	Hungarian Grand Prix	(Hungary) Hungaroring, Mogyoród	28 July
11	Belgian Grand Prix	(Belgium) Circuit de Spa-Francorchamps, Stavelot	25 August
12	Italian Grand Prix	(Italy) Autodromo Nazionale Monza, Monza	8 September
13	Singapore Grand Prix	Marina Bay Street Circuit, Singapore	22 September
14	Korean Grand Prix	(South Korea) Korea International Circuit, Yeongam	6 October
15	Japanese Grand Prix	(Japan) Suzuka Circuit, Suzuka	13 October
16	Indian Grand Prix	(India) Buddh International Circuit, Greater Noida	27 October
17	Abu Dhabi Grand Prix	(United Arab Emirates) Yas Marina Circuit, Abu Dhabi	3 November
18	United States Grand Prix	(United States) Circuit of the Americas, Austin, Texas	17 November
19	Brazilian Grand Prix	(Brazil) Autódromo José Carlos Pace, São Paulo	24 November

=== Calendar changes ===
==== New and returning races ====
Countries hosting Formula One Grands Prix in 2013

- The European Grand Prix was discontinued from 2013, making 2013 the first season without a European Grand Prix since 1998, with Valencia Street Circuit having hosted the event since 2008. (Note: From 1999-2007 the event was held at the Nürburgring, Germany) A possible return to Valencia, Spain in the future was not completely ruled out. On 12 March 2013, the Valencia Street Circuit permanently closed, and the European Grand Prix made its return in 2016 at the Baku City Circuit in Baku, Azerbaijan.
- Starting in 2008, the German Grand Prix has alternated between the Nürburgring in Nürburg and the Hockenheimring in Hockenheim. The Nürburgring hosted the German Grand Prix in 2013.
- The Russian Grand Prix was contracted in 2013, and was due to debut at the Sochi Autodrom, around the Olympic Park, hosting the 2014 Winter Olympics. However, the Grand Prix was delayed to 2014 after construction was not completed.

==== Failed race bids ====
- The 2013 season was scheduled to see the addition of the Grand Prix of America to the calendar. The race was to take place on a new, Hermann Tilke-designed street circuit in New Jersey in June of that year, back-to-back with the Canadian Grand Prix. However, shortly after the race was given a date on the provisional calendar, Bernie Ecclestone announced that the contract with organisers in New Jersey had been nullified, and organisers later confirmed that the race had been removed from the 2013 calendar and rescheduled for 2014. The collapse of the race was attributed to the failure to get all of the necessary permits to hold the race from multiple branches of state and federal government departments.

== Changes ==
=== Rule changes ===
==== Sporting regulations ====
- At the June 2012 meeting of the World Motor Sport Council, the FIA announced plans to introduce cost-control measures for the 2013 season, which would be policed by the FIA pending the agreement of the teams. This followed a failed attempt by former FIA president Max Mosley to introduce a budget cap for the 2010 season, and the withdrawal of Ferrari, Scuderia Toro Rosso, Sauber and Red Bull from the Formula One Teams Association in December 2011 over the implementation of the Resource Restriction Agreement, a voluntary agreement between teams to limit costs in the sport.
- Following HRT's omission from the provisional entry list, the grid was reduced to twenty-two cars, prompting an adaptation of the qualifying procedures. With twenty-two cars on the grid, six cars—instead of seven—would be eliminated during the first period of qualifying, with six more eliminated at the end of the second period (as in 2006–2008). The third qualifying period remained unchanged, with the ten fastest drivers all advancing to the final ten minutes of qualifying.
- The rules governing the use of the Drag Reduction System (DRS) have been altered. Where drivers were free to use the system at will during free practice and qualifying, from 2013, the use of DRS is restricted to the designated DRS zone in a bid to improve safety. In response to this, the FIA announced plans to include two DRS zones at every circuit on the 2013 calendar where it was feasible to do so.
- The FIA removed the rules of "force majeure" to clarify scrutineering procedures. Under the rules of force majeure, cars must be able to return to the pits under their own power during qualifying or else risk exclusion from the results. However, if a team can adequately demonstrate that circumstances beyond their control forced them to stop a car on the circuit before it could return to the pits, then the rules of force majeure dictate that the team and driver in question are exempt from any exclusion. Under new regulations, force majeure will no longer be recognised as a valid reason for stopping a car. From 2013, race stewards will measure the amount of fuel remaining in a car that has stopped on the circuit and compare it to the minimum amount set forward in the rules, and calculate any penalty based on the difference between the two. These changes were first proposed in the aftermath of the 2012 Abu Dhabi Grand Prix, when Red Bull Racing instructed Sebastian Vettel to stop on the circuit after qualifying. Although race stewards initially accepted the team's explanation that the order came because of an imminent technical fault that threatened lasting damage to Vettel's engine, it was later discovered that Vettel had insufficient fuel in his car at the time and had been ordered to pull over so as to preserve the mandatory one litre sample required for testing at the end of qualifying. As a result, Vettel was excluded from the results, and the changes to force majeure were put forward.
- The FIA introduced a curfew system in 2011 that prohibited team personnel from accessing the circuit in the six hours before the first session of the day, with teams given four "jokers"—exceptions to the rule that allowed them to stay within the circuit boundaries past the curfew hours without penalty so as to complete work on cars—to use throughout the season. The rule has been revised for 2013, with teams limited to two exceptions over the course of the year. The curfew hours have been also extended from six hours to eight.
- Teams were faced with an increased entry fee for the season. Whereas entry fees had previously been fixed at €309,000 (US$396,637) for all teams, from 2013, entry fees were based on the World Championship points a team scored during the previous season. Teams now paid a basic entry fee of $500,000 (€389,525), plus $5,000 (€3,895) per point scored. The reigning Constructors' Champion paid at a premium rate of $6,000 (€4,614) per point scored. With a final tally of 460 points, Red Bull Racing was presented with an entry fee of $3,260,000 (€2.5M).

==== Technical regulations ====
Artist's rendition of a stepped nose with a "vanity panel" (in red)

- Changes to the rules in 2012 resulted in the development of a "platypus" nose, with teams designing cars with a visible change in height along the nose assembly of the car. The design attracted criticism, with Red Bull Racing driver Mark Webber labelling the cars "ugly" and Ferrari team principal Stefano Domenicali calling them "not that pretty". At the 2012 Australian Grand Prix, Charlie Whiting, the FIA technical delegate, announced that although the changes to the sporting regulations planned for the 2014 season would effectively remove the "platypus" effect, the sport's governing body was planning to phase the stepped nose out for 2013. The FIA later accepted a proposal that would allow teams to cover up the stepped nose with a "modesty plate", a panel designed to obscure the step without fundamentally altering the aerodynamic profile of the car or offering any aerodynamic gain itself.
- The FIA completely overhauled testing procedures for front wings in 2013, introducing a more-comprehensive and strenuous series of tests designed to root out the practice of exploiting flexible bodywork regulations. Front wings in particular are subjected to revised parameters, with a tolerance of just 10 mm (0.39 in) permitted when the wing is subjected to a load of 100 kg (220 lb).
- The "double-DRS" system, first developed by Mercedes for the W03 in 2012 is banned in 2013. The device, which used a series of channels that ran through the car to create a stalling effect over the front wing when the rear wing Drag Reduction System was open, thereby cancelling out the downforce generated under normal conditions, would allow the car to achieve a higher top speed and better stability in fast corners. The system was the subject of several legal challenges early in the 2012 season, and rival team Lotus developed a similar system of their own before teams agreed to a ban in July 2012. However, while the regulations specifically banned the system developed by Mercedes, they make no provision for the variant developed by Lotus.
- The minimum weight of cars increased to 642 kg (1,415 lb) so as to account for the weight difference between the 2012 and 2013 specification of tyres.

=== Other changes ===
- The Sixth Concorde Agreement—the contract between the Fédération Internationale de l'Automobile (FIA), the Formula One teams and the Formula One Administration which dictates the terms by which the teams compete in races and take their share of the television revenues and prize money—which was first ratified by teams in 2009—expired at the end of 2012, necessitating the creation of the Seventh Concorde Agreement. As part of the renewed Agreement, the commercial rights to the sport were to be floated on the Singapore Stock Exchange; however, in June 2012 the planned flotation was delayed, with weak markets, uncertainty within Europe over the continent's economic future, and Facebook's disappointing IPO cited as reasons for the delay.
- The sport's decision-making process will be restructured. Prior to 2013, any decision to change the sporting or technical regulations required the agreement of at least 70% (or nine votes) of the teams in order for those changes to be accepted. From 2013 onwards, those changes will only need a 51% majority (six teams) in order to be approved. The Technical and Sporting Working Groups, the committees responsible for deciding upon the technical and sporting regulations, will also be disbanded in favour of a "Strategy Working Group" that will oversee both technical and sporting regulations and will be made up of representatives from each of the teams that scored points in the previous season's championship, the FIA, Formula One Management, one engine supplier and six event promoters. FIA president Jean Todt described the changes as necessary and designed to give each of the stakeholders in the sport a proportionate representation in deciding the future of Formula One.

== Season report ==
=== Championship summary ===
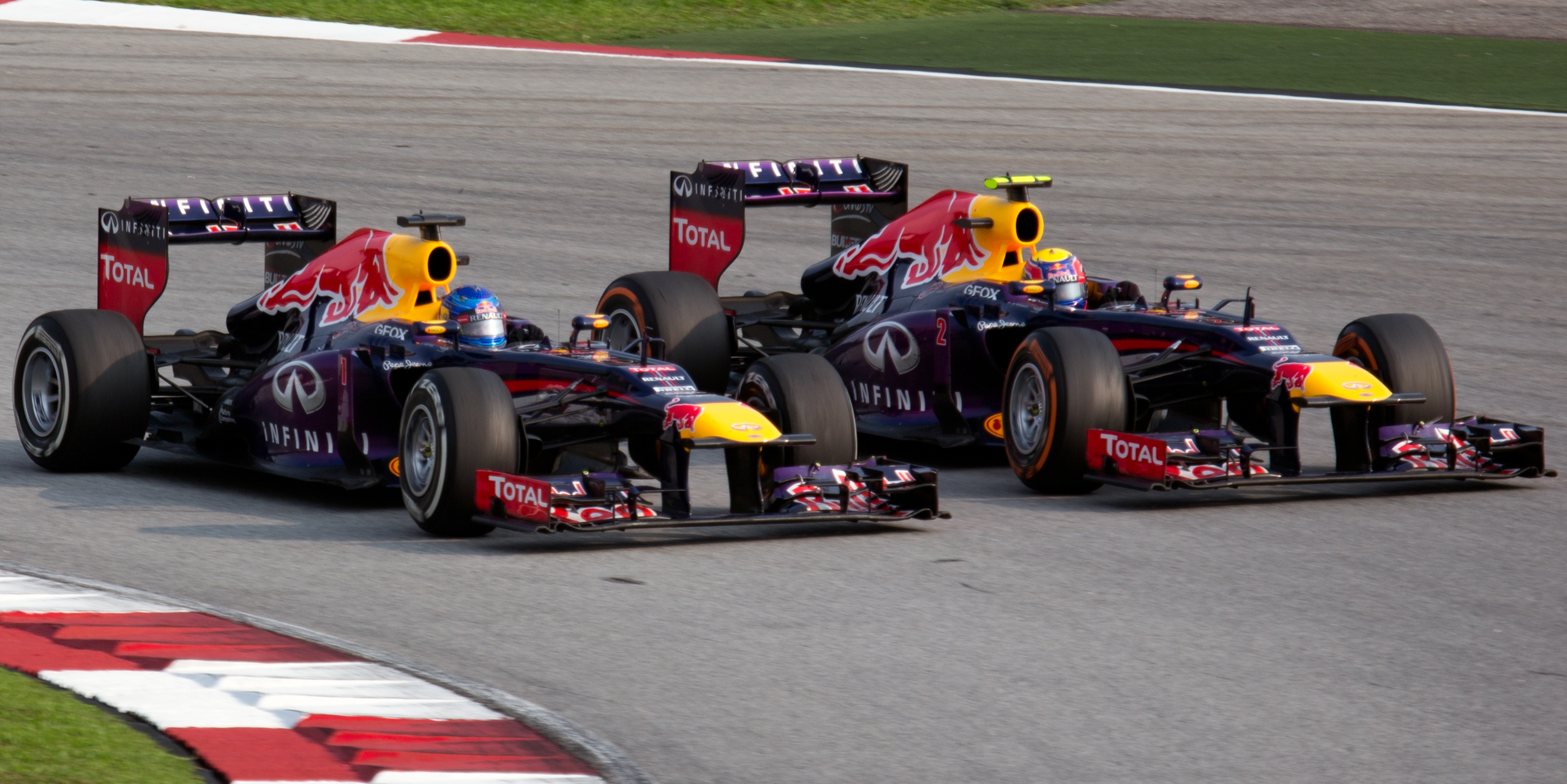
Sebastian Vettel defies team orders to overtake teammate Mark Webber in Malaysia.

With the nineteen races of the season completed, the defending World Champion, Red Bull Racing's Sebastian Vettel, retained the Drivers' Championship. He did so by winning in India and opening an unassailable 115-point gap with only three races remaining. He broke the record for most consecutive wins in a single season with nine. He also tied the record for consecutive wins, which was set by Alberto Ascari in 1952–1953, and for total wins in a single season with 13, set by Michael Schumacher in 2004. His record tally of 13 wins included a controversial victory at the Malaysian Grand Prix that came when he defied team orders, overtaking teammate Mark Webber late in the race to secure victory. Vettel apologised afterwards to the team, although he later refused to apologise for winning. Vettel's other wins came in Bahrain, Canada, Germany, Belgium, Italy, Singapore, Korea, Japan, India, Abu Dhabi, the United States and Brazil. The four times world champion scored 397 points, also a record until 2018, when Lewis Hamilton scored 408 points. Webber finished his last Formula One season in third place with 199 points. It was the first time since 2008 that the Australian failed to win a race. Their combined results allowed Red Bull to clinch the 2013 Constructors' Championship in India by opening a gap of 157 points, with only 129 still up to grab. The team scored a total of 596 points.

Ferrari's Fernando Alonso finished as the runner-up with 242 points. The Spaniard won two races, in China and Spain, and scored five second-places, in Australia, Canada, Belgium, Italy and Singapore, to keep him in a strong championship position throughout the season. However, a retirement in Malaysia and relatively poor results in Bahrain, Monaco, Korea and India saw him fall behind Vettel in the points. The gap closed briefly after the German's gearbox failure at the British Grand Prix, but the defending world champion scored eleven consecutive podium finishes after his sole retirement of the season, including ten wins, to clinch the title. Alonso's teammate Felipe Massa finished eighth in the standings, scoring 112 points with a single podium finish in Spain. Ferrari lost second place in the Constructors' Championship to Mercedes, finishing a mere 6 points behind.

Lewis Hamilton, who scored a win in Hungary, four third places and five pole positions in 2013 with Mercedes AMG, finished fourth in the drivers' standings with 189 points. His Malaysian Grand Prix podium came with a share of controversy as team orders were employed to help him retain third place. After the race, Hamilton said that his teammate Nico Rosberg was the one who actually deserved the podium. Italy was the first time that Hamilton failed to make a Q3 appearance since the 2010 Malaysian Grand Prix. As a result, the Briton's streak of consecutive Q3 appearances ended at 66. Hamilton also suffered his first retirement of the season in Japan due to damage caused by a puncture, which he got from a clash with Vettel. Rosberg, despite winning the Monaco and British Grands Prix, finished sixth, with retirements in Australia, China and Hungary, as well as a string of bad luck preventing him from having clean races, hurting his point tally. Mercedes finished as the runner-up to Red Bull in the Constructors' Championship with 360 points.

Lotus driver Kimi Räikkönen finished fifth in the Drivers' Championship with 183 points. He missed the last two races of the season due to a back surgery. The Finn won the season-opening Australian Grand Prix and placed second at the Chinese, Bahrain, Spanish, German, Hungarian and Korean Grands Prix, but a retirement in Belgium combined with a non-points finish in Italy opened the gap to the championship leader. Belgium was the first time Räikkönen failed to finish a race since returning to the sport at the 2012 Australian Grand Prix. It also ended Räikkönen's record run of consecutive points finishes at 27, which started at the 2012 Bahrain Grand Prix. Teammate Romain Grosjean finished third in Bahrain, Germany, Korea, Japan and India, finishing seventh in the points standings. He also saw a return of 2012 controversies during the first half of the season after being handed a 10-place grid penalty for the Canadian Grand Prix, which he received for crashing into Daniel Ricciardo at Monaco. He was also handed a 20-second time penalty in Hungary for a collision with Jenson Button. However, the Frenchman found great form and confidence afterwards to score three consecutive podium finishes and equalled his best ever result in the United States with second place. Poor showings in Monaco, Canada, Great Britain, Belgium, Italy and Brazil saw Lotus fall to fourth in the Constructors' Championship with 315 points, 39 adrift of Ferrari for third place.

Despite finishing the 2012 season with two wins in the final two races, McLaren openly admitted to a difficult 2013 campaign. Button finished ninth overall, 39 points behind Massa, whilst teammate Sergio Pérez ended up eleventh. The team ended the season in fifth place in the Constructors' Championship, with a best result of fourth achieved by Button in Brazil. It was the first time since 2006 that McLaren failed to win a race and the first time since 1980 that the team did not score a podium. Force India had a strong start to the season, with Paul di Resta finishing fourth in Bahrain and Adrian Sutil recording a fifth place in Monaco, though the team's performance fell significantly during the second half of the season, with only 3 points scored in seven races from Germany to Japan. However, the team put both cars in the points at its home race as well as in Abu Dhabi. Di Resta has been very consistent during the first half of the season, claiming points in six consecutive races from China to Great Britain. The team finished in sixth place in the Constructors' Championship, 45 points behind McLaren.

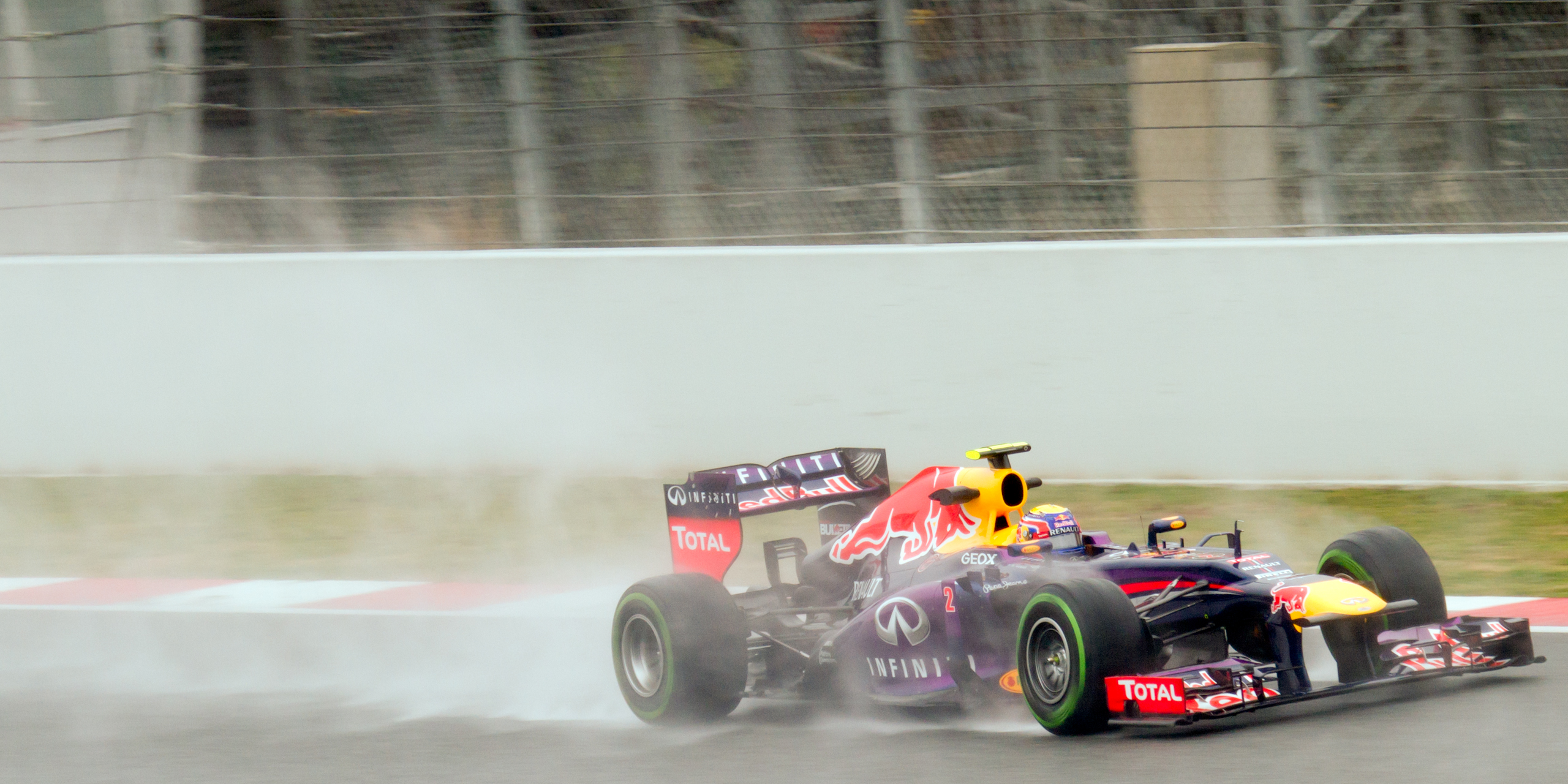
Mark Webber finished in 3rd place in his final year in Formula One.

Sauber endured a very difficult first half of the season, scoring just seven points in the first 11 Grands Prix. However, Nico Hülkenberg showed impressive form in Italy, qualifying third and finishing fifth in the race, in Korea, where he started seventh and fought off Hamilton and Alonso for fourth, as well as in the United States, where he qualified fourth and finished sixth. The team also enjoyed a great team result in Japan, where the German finished sixth and his rookie teammate Esteban Gutiérrez seventh, the Mexican's first and only points of the season. Sauber scored 57 points and finished in seventh place in the Constructors' Championship. Gutiérrez endured a difficult introduction to Formula One, with a retirement due to driver error in China, a lowly eighteenth place in Bahrain and a string of grid penalties for causing avoidable collisions and blocking other drivers during qualifying. Despite this, he recorded the fastest lap of the race in Spain, secured his first career top ten qualifying appearance in Singapore, repeated the feat in Korea and drove a strong race for seventh in Japan. Scuderia Toro Rosso finished in eight place overall with career-best results for both Daniel Ricciardo, who finished seventh in China and Italy, and Jean-Éric Vergne, who finished sixth in Canada. Qualifying improved as well with the team making the top ten in qualifying on a regular basis, with a peak of fifth for Ricciardo at Silverstone. Williams endured one of their worst seasons, not scoring points until Pastor Maldonado finished tenth in Hungary. Teammate Valtteri Bottas qualified third in changeable conditions in Canada, but was unable to carry the speed into the race. However, the Finn scored his first career points in the United States after a strong weekend, finishing eighth in the race. Williams finished ninth in the Constructors' Championship, 28 points adrift of Toro Rosso.

Marussia F1 and Caterham F1 did not score points in 2013. The teams' best results were achieved by Jules Bianchi, who scored a thirteenth for Marussia, and by Charles Pic and Giedo van der Garde, who have both scored a fourteenth-place finish for Caterham. By virtue of Bianchi's thirteenth place in Malaysia, Marussia ended the season in tenth.

=== Tyre issues ===
Tyre supplier Pirelli faced criticism early in the season due to the wear of some tyres, with some claiming tyre management had become too important to race strategy. This prompted Pirelli to announce plans to introduce new designs after the Canadian Grand Prix. The testing Pirelli undertook on these proposed new designs led to an official complaint on the eve of the Monaco Grand Prix from Ferrari and Red Bull who claimed the way it was done, using the 2013 Mercedes car and drivers, would give them a competitive advantage in both Monaco and Canada. There were also disputes over the change in the failure mode that were the result of new manufacturing methods, as to whether these increased or decreased safety. As the teams arrived in Montreal for the Canadian Grand Prix it was announced that, after further enquiries were made to all teams, the FIA were referring the Mercedes tyre test to its International Tribunal as it may have breached the rules. The FIA cleared an earlier test by Ferrari as it used a 2011 car, which was not a breach of the rules. To reduce the number of delaminations, Pirelli introduced two new specifications of rear tyre in time for the Canadian race, which also reverted to the belt pack used in 2011 and 2012 tyres. In announcing the tyre, Pirelli said there would be no further tyre changes for the 2013 season due to the fact that to doing so would need the agreement of all teams, some of whom did not want their performance to be affected by such a mid-season change.

Tyre issues continued to dominate headlines at the British Grand Prix when several drivers suffered explosive punctures during the race. Amid concerns that the issue would continue at the German Grand Prix one week later, Pirelli received permission to introduce an entirely new specification of tyre in time for the Hungarian Grand Prix, whilst introducing modifications to the existing tyres for the race in Germany as a stop-gap solution. The FIA also imposed restrictions of their own, banning the teams from swapping the left- and right-side tyres around, a practice that had been employed to extend the lifespan of the tyres.

== Results and standings ==
=== Grands Prix ===
Round	Grand Prix	Pole position	Fastest lap	Winning driver	Winning constructor	Report
1	(Australia) Australian Grand Prix	(Germany) Sebastian Vettel	(Finland) Kimi Räikkönen	(Finland) Kimi Räikkönen	(United Kingdom) Lotus-Renault	Report
2	(Malaysia) Malaysian Grand Prix	(Germany) Sebastian Vettel	(Mexico) Sergio Pérez	(Germany) Sebastian Vettel	(Austria) Red Bull-Renault	Report
3	(China) Chinese Grand Prix	(United Kingdom) Lewis Hamilton	(Germany) Sebastian Vettel	(Spain) Fernando Alonso	(Italy) Ferrari	Report
4	Bahrain Grand Prix	(Germany) Nico Rosberg	(Germany) Sebastian Vettel	(Germany) Sebastian Vettel	(Austria) Red Bull-Renault	Report
5	(Spain) Spanish Grand Prix	(Germany) Nico Rosberg	(Mexico) Esteban Gutiérrez	(Spain) Fernando Alonso	(Italy) Ferrari	Report
6	Monaco Grand Prix	(Germany) Nico Rosberg	(Germany) Sebastian Vettel	(Germany) Nico Rosberg	(Germany) Mercedes	Report
7	(Canada) Canadian Grand Prix	(Germany) Sebastian Vettel	(Australia) Mark Webber	(Germany) Sebastian Vettel	(Austria) Red Bull-Renault	Report
8	(United Kingdom) British Grand Prix	(United Kingdom) Lewis Hamilton	(Australia) Mark Webber	(Germany) Nico Rosberg	(Germany) Mercedes	Report
9	(Germany) German Grand Prix	(United Kingdom) Lewis Hamilton	(Spain) Fernando Alonso	(Germany) Sebastian Vettel	(Austria) Red Bull-Renault	Report
10	(Hungary) Hungarian Grand Prix	(United Kingdom) Lewis Hamilton	(Australia) Mark Webber	(United Kingdom) Lewis Hamilton	(Germany) Mercedes	Report
11	(Belgium) Belgian Grand Prix	(United Kingdom) Lewis Hamilton	(Germany) Sebastian Vettel	(Germany) Sebastian Vettel	(Austria) Red Bull-Renault	Report
12	(Italy) Italian Grand Prix	(Germany) Sebastian Vettel	(United Kingdom) Lewis Hamilton	(Germany) Sebastian Vettel	(Austria) Red Bull-Renault	Report
13	Singapore Grand Prix	(Germany) Sebastian Vettel	(Germany) Sebastian Vettel	(Germany) Sebastian Vettel	(Austria) Red Bull-Renault	Report
14	(South Korea) Korean Grand Prix	(Germany) Sebastian Vettel	(Germany) Sebastian Vettel	(Germany) Sebastian Vettel	(Austria) Red Bull-Renault	Report
15	(Japan) Japanese Grand Prix	(Australia) Mark Webber	(Australia) Mark Webber	(Germany) Sebastian Vettel	(Austria) Red Bull-Renault	Report
16	(India) Indian Grand Prix	(Germany) Sebastian Vettel	(Finland) Kimi Räikkönen	(Germany) Sebastian Vettel	(Austria) Red Bull-Renault	Report
17	(United Arab Emirates) Abu Dhabi Grand Prix	(Australia) Mark Webber	(Spain) Fernando Alonso	(Germany) Sebastian Vettel	(Austria) Red Bull-Renault	Report
18	United States Grand Prix	(Germany) Sebastian Vettel	(Germany) Sebastian Vettel	(Germany) Sebastian Vettel	(Austria) Red Bull-Renault	Report
19	(Brazil) Brazilian Grand Prix	(Germany) Sebastian Vettel	(Australia) Mark Webber	(Germany) Sebastian Vettel	(Austria) Red Bull-Renault	Report

=== Scoring system ===
Points were awarded to the top ten classified finishers using the following structure:

Position	1st	2nd	3rd	4th	5th	6th	7th	8th	9th	10th
Points	25	18	15	12	10	8	6	4	2	1

=== World Drivers' Championship standings ===
Pos.	Driver	AUS (Australia)	MAL (Malaysia)	CHN (China)	BHR (Bahrain)	ESP (Spain)	MON (Monaco)	CAN (Canada)	GBR (United Kingdom)	GER (Germany)	HUN (Hungary)	BEL (Belgium)	ITA (Italy)	SIN (Singapore)	KOR (South Korea)	JPN (Japan)	IND (India)	ABU (United Arab Emirates)	USA (United States)	BRA (Brazil)	Points
1	(Germany) Sebastian Vettel	3^{P}	1^{P}	4^{F}	1^{F}	4	2^{F}	1^{P}	Ret	1	3	1^{F}	1^{P}	1^{P}^{F}	1^{P}^{F}	1	1^{P}	1	1^{P}^{F}	1^{P}	397
2	(Spain) Fernando Alonso	2	Ret	1	8	1	7	2	3	4^{F}	5	2	2	2	6	4	11	5^{F}	5	3	242
3	(Australia) Mark Webber	6	2	Ret	7	5	3	4^{F}	2^{F}	7	4^{F}	5	3	15^{†}	Ret	2^{P}^{F}	Ret	2^{P}	3	2^{F}	199
4	(United Kingdom) Lewis Hamilton	5	3	3^{P}	5	12	4	3	4^{P}	5^{P}	1^{P}	3^{P}	9^{F}	5	5	Ret	6	7	4	9	189
5	(Finland) Kimi Räikkönen	1^{F}	7	2	2	2	10	9	5	2	2	Ret	11	3	2	5	7^{F}	Ret			183
6	(Germany) Nico Rosberg	Ret	4	Ret	9^{P}	6^{P}	1^{P}	5	1	9	19^{†}	4	6	4	7	8	2	3	9	5	171
7	(France) Romain Grosjean	10	6	9	3	Ret	Ret	13	19^{†}	3	6	8	8	Ret	3	3	3	4	2	Ret	132
8	(Brazil) Felipe Massa	4	5	6	15	3	Ret	8	6	Ret	8	7	4	6	9	10	4	8	12	7	112
9	(United Kingdom) Jenson Button	9	17^{†}	5	10	8	6	12	13	6	7	6	10	7	8	9	14	12	10	4	73
10	(Germany) Nico Hülkenberg	DNS	8	10	12	15	11	Ret	10	10	11	13	5	9	4	6	19^{†}	14	6	8	51
11	(Mexico) Sergio Pérez	11	9^{F}	11	6	9	16^{†}	11	20^{†}	8	9	11	12	8	10	15	5	9	7	6	49
12	(United Kingdom) Paul di Resta	8	Ret	8	4	7	9	7	9	11	18^{†}	Ret	Ret	20^{†}	Ret	11	8	6	15	11	48
13	(Germany) Adrian Sutil	7	Ret	Ret	13	13	5	10	7	13	Ret	9	16^{†}	10	20^{†}	14	9	10	Ret	13	29
14	(Australia) Daniel Ricciardo	Ret	18^{†}	7	16	10	Ret	15	8	12	13	10	7	Ret	19^{†}	13	10	16	11	10	20
15	(France) Jean-Éric Vergne	12	10	12	Ret	Ret	8	6	Ret	Ret	12	12	Ret	14	18^{†}	12	13	17	16	15	13
16	(Mexico) Esteban Gutiérrez	13	12	Ret	18	11^{F}	13	20^{†}	14	14	Ret	14	13	12	11	7	15	13	13	12	6
17	(Finland) Valtteri Bottas	14	11	13	14	16	12	14	12	16	Ret	15	15	13	12	17	16	15	8	Ret	4
18	(Venezuela) Pastor Maldonado	Ret	Ret	14	11	14	Ret	16	11	15	10	17	14	11	13	16	12	11	17	16	1
19	(France) Jules Bianchi	15	13	15	19	18	Ret	17	16	Ret	16	18	19	18	16	Ret	18	20	18	17	0
20	(France) Charles Pic	16	14	16	17	17	Ret	18	15	17	15	Ret	17	19	14	18	Ret	19	20	Ret	0
21	(Finland) Heikki Kovalainen																		14	14	0
22	(Netherlands) Giedo van der Garde	18	15	18	21	Ret	15	Ret	18	18	14	16	18	16	15	Ret	Ret	18	19	18	0
23	(United Kingdom) Max Chilton	17	16	17	20	19	14	19	17	19	17	19	20	17	17	19	17	21	21	19	0
Pos.	Driver	AUS (Australia)	MAL (Malaysia)	CHN (China)	BHR (Bahrain)	ESP (Spain)	MON (Monaco)	CAN (Canada)	GBR (United Kingdom)	GER (Germany)	HUN (Hungary)	BEL (Belgium)	ITA (Italy)	SIN (Singapore)	KOR (South Korea)	JPN (Japan)	IND (India)	ABU (United Arab Emirates)	USA (United States)	BRA (Brazil)	Points
Pos.	Driver	Grands Prix																			Points

Key
Colour	Result
Gold	Winner
Silver	Second place
Bronze	Third place
Green	Other points position
Blue	Other classified position
Blue	Not classified, finished (NC)
Purple	Not classified, retired (Ret)
Red	Did not qualify (DNQ)
Black	Disqualified (DSQ)
White	Did not start (DNS)
White	Race cancelled (C)
Blank	Did not practice (DNP)
Blank	Excluded (EX)
Blank	Did not arrive (DNA)
Blank	Withdrawn (WD)
Blank	Did not enter (empty cell)
Annotation	Meaning
P	Pole position
F	Fastest lap

Notes:

- † – Drivers did not finish the Grand Prix, but were classified as they completed more than 90% of the race distance.

=== World Constructors' Championship standings ===
Pos.	Constructor	No.	AUS (Australia)	MAL (Malaysia)	CHN (China)	BHR (Bahrain)	ESP (Spain)	MON (Monaco)	CAN (Canada)	GBR (United Kingdom)	GER (Germany)	HUN (Hungary)	BEL (Belgium)	ITA (Italy)	SIN (Singapore)	KOR (South Korea)	JPN (Japan)	IND (India)	ABU (United Arab Emirates)	USA (United States)	BRA (Brazil)	Points
1	(Austria) Red Bull Racing-Renault	1	3^{P}	1^{P}	4^{F}	1^{F}	4	2^{F}	1^{P}	Ret	1	3	1^{F}	1^{P}	1^{P}^{F}	1^{P}^{F}	1	1^{P}	1	1^{P}^{F}	1^{P}	596
1	(Austria) Red Bull Racing-Renault	2	6	2	Ret	7	5	3	4^{F}	2^{F}	7	4^{F}	5	3	15^{†}	Ret	2^{P}^{F}	Ret	2^{P}	3	2^{F}	596
2	(Germany) Mercedes	9	Ret	4	Ret	9^{P}	6^{P}	1^{P}	5	1	9	19^{†}	4	6	4	7	8	2	3	9	5	360
2	(Germany) Mercedes	10	5	3	3^{P}	5	12	4	3	4^{P}	5^{P}	1^{P}	3^{P}	9^{F}	5	5	Ret	6	7	4	9	360
3	(Italy) Ferrari	3	2	Ret	1	8	1	7	2	3	4^{F}	5	2	2	2	6	4	11	5^{F}	5	3	354
3	(Italy) Ferrari	4	4	5	6	15	3	Ret	8	6	Ret	8	7	4	6	9	10	4	8	12	7	354
4	(United Kingdom) Lotus-Renault	7	1^{F}	7	2	2	2	10	9	5	2	2	Ret	11	3	2	5	7^{F}	Ret	14	14	315
4	(United Kingdom) Lotus-Renault	8	10	6	9	3	Ret	Ret	13	19^{†}	3	6	8	8	Ret	3	3	3	4	2	Ret	315
5	(United Kingdom) McLaren-Mercedes	5	9	17^{†}	5	10	8	6	12	13	6	7	6	10	7	8	9	14	12	10	4	122
5	(United Kingdom) McLaren-Mercedes	6	11	9^{F}	11	6	9	16^{†}	11	20^{†}	8	9	11	12	8	10	15	5	9	7	6	122
6	Force India-Mercedes	14	8	Ret	8	4	7	9	7	9	11	18^{†}	Ret	Ret	20^{†}	Ret	11	8	6	15	11	77
6	Force India-Mercedes	15	7	Ret	Ret	13	13	5	10	7	13	Ret	9	16^{†}	10	20^{†}	14	9	10	Ret	13	77
7	(Switzerland) Sauber-Ferrari	11	DNS	8	10	12	15	11	Ret	10	10	11	13	5	9	4	6	19^{†}	14	6	8	57
7	(Switzerland) Sauber-Ferrari	12	13	12	Ret	18	11^{F}	13	20^{†}	14	14	Ret	14	13	12	11	7	15	13	13	12	57
8	(Italy) Toro Rosso-Ferrari	18	12	10	12	Ret	Ret	8	6	Ret	Ret	12	12	Ret	14	18^{†}	12	13	17	16	15	33
8	(Italy) Toro Rosso-Ferrari	19	Ret	18^{†}	7	16	10	Ret	15	8	12	13	10	7	Ret	19^{†}	13	10	16	11	10	33
9	(United Kingdom) Williams-Renault	16	Ret	Ret	14	11	14	Ret	16	11	15	10	17	14	11	13	16	12	11	17	16	5
9	(United Kingdom) Williams-Renault	17	14	11	13	14	16	12	14	12	16	Ret	15	15	13	12	17	16	15	8	Ret	5
10	(Russia) Marussia-Cosworth	22	15	13	15	19	18	Ret	17	16	Ret	16	18	19	18	16	Ret	18	20	18	17	0
10	(Russia) Marussia-Cosworth	23	17	16	17	20	19	14	19	17	19	17	19	20	17	17	19	17	21	21	19	0
11	(Malaysia) Caterham-Renault	20	16	14	16	17	17	Ret	18	15	17	15	Ret	17	19	14	18	Ret	19	20	Ret	0
11	(Malaysia) Caterham-Renault	21	18	15	18	21	Ret	15	Ret	18	18	14	16	18	16	15	Ret	Ret	18	19	18	0
Pos.	Constructor	No.	AUS (Australia)	MAL (Malaysia)	CHN (China)	BHR (Bahrain)	ESP (Spain)	MON (Monaco)	CAN (Canada)	GBR (United Kingdom)	GER (Germany)	HUN (Hungary)	BEL (Belgium)	ITA (Italy)	SIN (Singapore)	KOR (South Korea)	JPN (Japan)	IND (India)	ABU (United Arab Emirates)	USA (United States)	BRA (Brazil)	Points

Key
Colour	Result
Gold	Winner
Silver	Second place
Bronze	Third place
Green	Other points position
Blue	Other classified position
Blue	Not classified, finished (NC)
Purple	Not classified, retired (Ret)
Red	Did not qualify (DNQ)
Black	Disqualified (DSQ)
White	Did not start (DNS)
White	Race cancelled (C)
Blank	Did not practice (DNP)
Blank	Excluded (EX)
Blank	Did not arrive (DNA)
Blank	Withdrawn (WD)
Blank	Did not enter (empty cell)
Annotation	Meaning
P	Pole position
F	Fastest lap

Notes:

- † – Drivers did not finish the Grand Prix, but were classified as they completed more than 90% of the race distance.

== See also ==
- 2013 Formula One pre-season testing
