= Material efficiency =

Practice of reducing material used to make a product

In manufacturing and construction, material efficiency refers to the practice of decreasing the amount of a particular material needed to produce a specific product. It also refers to the metric M_{p}, the ratio of used material used to the supplied material, which should be minimized in practice. Some forms of material efficiency include increasing the life of existing products, using them more in entirety, re-using components to avoid waste, or reducing the amount of material through a lightweight product design. Material efficiency is associated with green building and energy conservation, as well as other ways of incorporating renewable resources in the building process from start to finish.

Increasing material efficiency can reduce the impacts of material consumption. The impacts can include reducing energy demand, reducing greenhouse gas emissions, and other environmental impacts such as land use, water scarcity, air pollution, water pollution, and waste management.

== Manufacturing ==
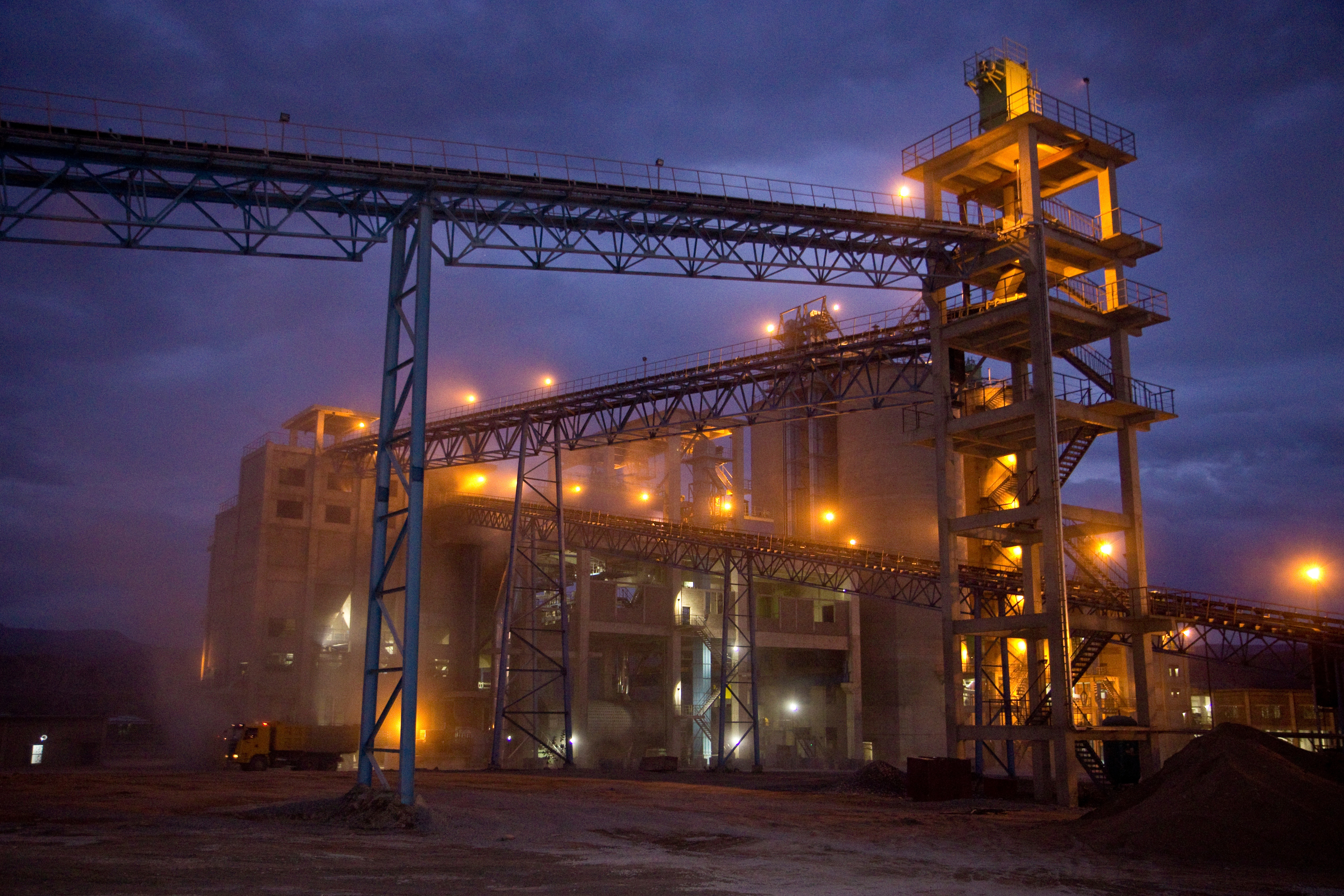
Minimizing waste is a factor in material resource efficiency.

Material efficiency in manufacturing refers to Increasing the efficiency of raw materials to manufactured product, generating less waste per product, and improving waste management. Using building materials such as steel, reinforced concrete, and aluminum release CO_{2} during production. In 2015, materials manufacturing for building construction were responsible for 11% of global energy-related CO_{2} emissions. The largest market for aluminum is the transportation sector, smaller applications of aluminum include building, construction, and packaging.

The potential in manufacturing can also refer to improving waste segregation (e.g., separating plastics from combustibles). Recycling and reusing components allow for remanufacturing during the process improvement in creating the product, increasing the material's durability, technology development, and correct component/material purchasing.

Material efficiency can contribute to a circular economy and capturing value in the industry. Some companies have applied the circular economy theory to design strategies and business models to close material loops.

== Building process ==
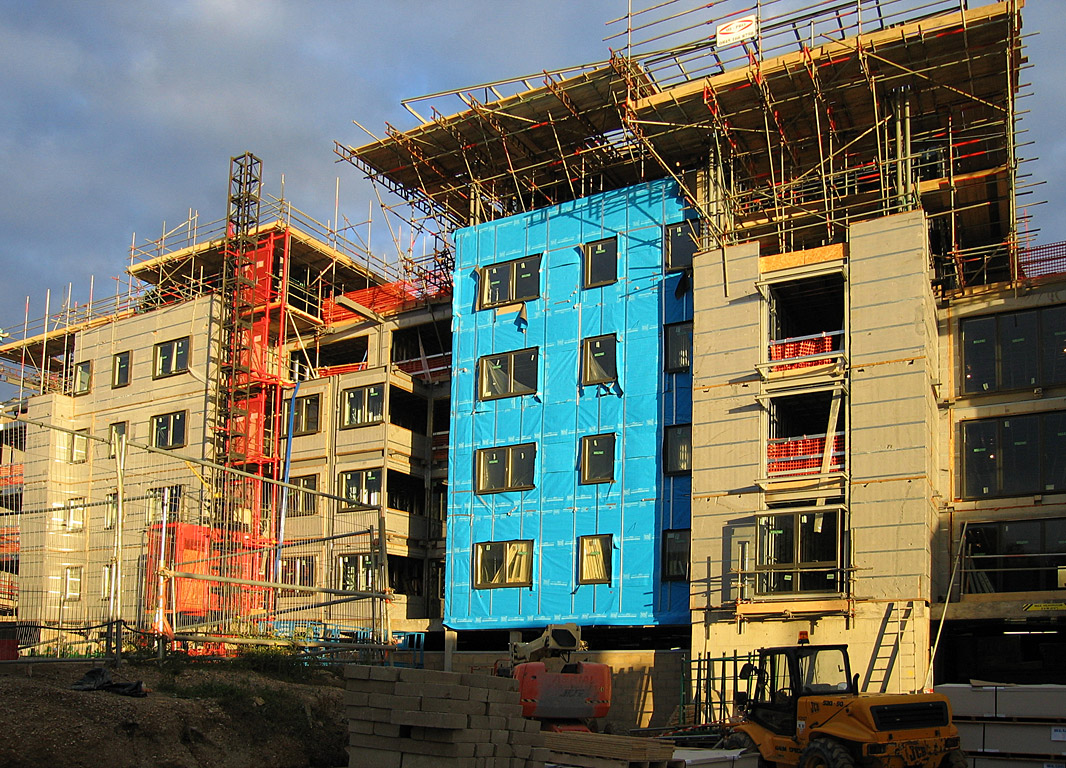
Building construction often is resource-intensive.

Since 1971, global steel demand has increased by three times, cement by slightly under seven times, primary aluminum by almost six times, and plastics by over ten times. Significant materials, such as iron and steel, aluminum, cement, chemical products, and pulp and paper, impact the building process. However, employing more efficient strategies to produce these materials will reduce energy and cost without ignoring the reduction of carbon emissions.

One process is using recycled steel saves room in landfills that the steel would otherwise occupy, saves 75% of the energy required to produce steel in the production process, and saves trees from being cut down to build structures. The recycled steel can be fashioned in the exact dimensions needed for the building and can be made into "customized steel beams and panels to fit each specific design."

== Strategies ==
During the manufacturing process, each stage can increase material efficiency, from design and fabrication, through use, and finally to the end of life.

Some strategies are:

- Reduction: Strategies that may reduce the use of material while providing the same effect. Designing for durability could also result in a resilient material. Modular design can facilitate material efficiency by reusing components and minimizing components needed in the production process.
- Durability: Extending product life through redesign or repair. More intensive use and extending products or buildings' lifetimes through repair and refurbishment can reduce the need for materials to produce new products.
- Lightweight products: The reduction of material used for service; Some examples are: Universal beams, food cans, reinforcing bars, and commercial steel-framed buildings.
- Reuse: The primary purpose is to re-use components for remanufacturing/refurbishing. Reusing current materials uses even less energy than recycling.

== Recycling ==
Recycling can allow for lower-emission second purposes to new materials like steel, aluminum, and other metals. Incorporating recycled materials into the manufacturing process of new goods is a necessary change. Recycling is standard for most materials and is found in every country and economy. Some materials that can be recycled are:

- Aluminum

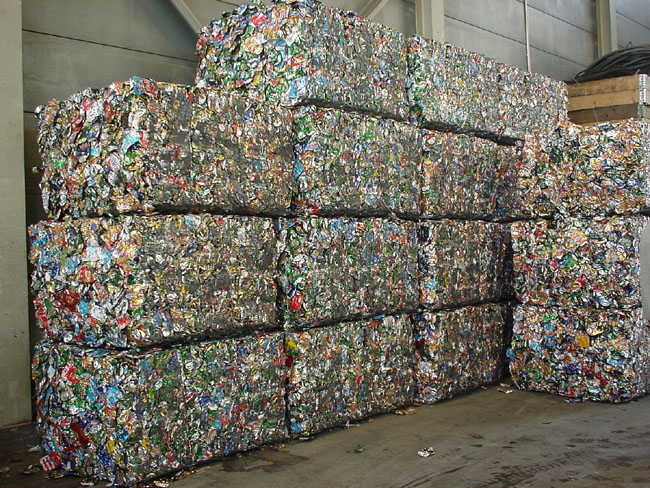
Compressed aluminum-cans for recycling.

Aluminum cans from recycled material requiring as little as 4% of the energy needed to make the same cans from bauxite ore. Metals don't degrade as they're recycled in the same way plastics and paper do, fibers shortening every cycle, so many metals are prime candidates for recycling, especially considering their value per ton compared to other recyclables. Aluminum is a highly desirable metal for recycling because it retains the same properties and quality, no matter how many times the aluminum can be recycled. After all, once it's melted, the structure doesn't change.

- Plastics

Approximately 36% of all plastic produced is used to create packaging, 85% of which ends up in landfills. Plastic waste is a mixture of different types of plastics. Plastic recycling has several challenges. Plastic cannot be recycled several times without quickly degrading in quality; The total bottle recycling rate for 2020 was 27.2%, down from 28.7% in 2019. Every hour, 2.5 million plastic bottles are thrown away in the U.S. Currently, around 75 and 199 million tons of plastic are in our oceans, without considering microplastics.

- Paper

Paper (particularly newspaper) have lower energy savings than other materials, with recycled products costing 45% and 21% less energy, respectively. Recycled paper has a large market in China. However, work still needs to be done to facilitate mixed paper recycling instead of newspaper. Utilizing these recycling methods would permit spending less energy and resources on extracting new resources to use in manufacturing. Despite significant progress in recycling over the last decades, the paper sector is a substantial contributor to global greenhouse gas emissions. The pulp and paper industries produce 50% of their energy from biomass, which still requires vast energy.

== Policy ==
Public policies help to discuss and provide a market incentive for more efficient use of materials. Impediments to material efficiency improvement include hesitation to invest, a lack of available and accessible information, and economic disincentives. However, a wide range of policy strategies and innovations have been created in some countries to achieve the mentioned goals. These include regulation and guidelines; economic incentives; voluntary agreements and actions; information, education, and training; and funding for research, development, and demonstration.

In 2022, the United States released "The Critical Material Innovation, Efficiency, And Alternatives" program. It will be to study, develop, demonstrate, and trade with the primary goal of creating new alternatives to critical material, promoting efficient manufacturing and use. In addition, The U.S. Department of Energy released a new "Energy Efficiency Materials Pilot Program for Nonprofits" program to provide nonprofit organizations with funding to upgrade building materials to improve energy efficiency, lower utility costs, and reduce carbon emissions.

== See also ==
- Circular economy
- Conservation ethic
- Conservation movement
- Ecological deficit
- Energy conservation
- Environmental protection
- Environmental sustainable innovation
- Renewable energy
- Sustainable architecture
