= Nico Rosberg =

German and Finnish racing driver (born 1985)

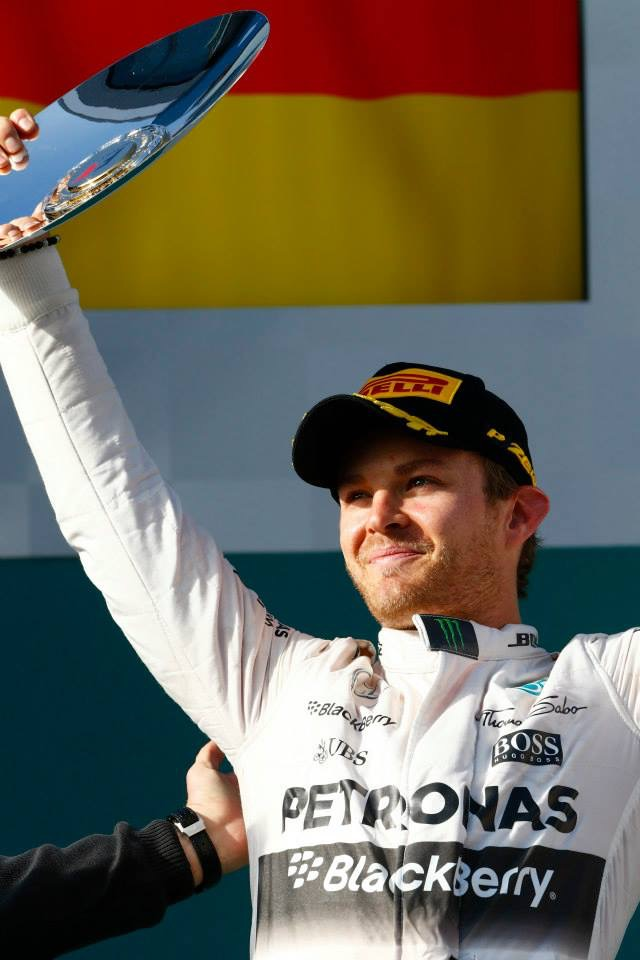
- Rosberg at the 2015 Australian Grand Prix
- Born: Nico Erik Rosberg; 27 June 1985 (age 41); Wiesbaden, West Germany
- Spouse: Vivian Sibold (m. 2014)
- Children: 2
- Father: Keke Rosberg

Formula One World Championship career
- Nationality: (Germany) German
- Active years: 2006–2016
- Team(s): Williams, Mercedes
- Car number: 6
- Entries: 206 (206 starts)
- Championships: 1 (2016)
- Wins: 23
- Podiums: 57
- Career points: 1594.5
- Pole positions: 30
- Fastest laps: 20
- First entry: 2006 Bahrain Grand Prix
- First win: 2012 Chinese Grand Prix
- Last win: 2016 Japanese Grand Prix
- Last entry: 2016 Abu Dhabi Grand Prix
- Website: nicorosberg.com

Signature
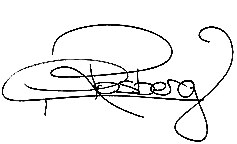

Nico Erik Rosberg (Note: English: /ˈniːkoʊ ˈrɒzbɜːrɡ/ NEE-koh ROZ-burg; German: [ˈniːko ˈeːʁɪk ˈʁɔsbɛʁk]; Finnish: [ˈniko ˈeːrik ˈruːsbæri].) (born 27 June 1985) is a German and Finnish former racing driver, entrepreneur, and broadcaster who competed under the German flag in Formula One from 2006 to 2016. Rosberg won the Formula One World Drivers' Championship in 2016 with Mercedes, and won 23 Grands Prix across 11 seasons.

The only child of Finnish 1982 Formula One World Champion Keke Rosberg and his German wife, he was born in Wiesbaden but was raised primarily in Monaco. Rosberg began competitive kart racing at the age of six and achieved early success, winning regional and national French championships, before moving to European-based series and world championships. At the age of 16, he progressed to car racing, winning nine races to claim the 2002 Formula BMW ADAC Championship with VIVA Racing. He subsequently moved to the higher-tier Formula 3 Euro Series with Team Rosberg in 2003 and 2004 before winning the inaugural GP2 Series championship with ART Grand Prix in 2005.

Rosberg first drove in Formula One with Williams from 2006 to 2009 and achieved two podium finishes for the team in 2008. For 2010, he moved to Mercedes, partnering fellow German and seven-time World Drivers' Champion Michael Schumacher. Rosberg took his first career win at the 2012 Chinese Grand Prix. He was the teammate of former karting friend, Lewis Hamilton, from 2013 to 2016, twice finishing runner-up to his teammate, and in his final season defeating Hamilton to win the 2016 title. He and his father Keke are the second father-son pairing, after Graham and Damon Hill, that have both won World Drivers' Championships.

Rosberg announced his retirement from motor racing five days after clinching the title, citing wanting to spend more time with his family and not wanting his driving ability to atrophy as the main factors behind his decision. Overall, he started 206 Grands Prix, achieving 23 wins, 30 pole positions, 20 fastest laps and 57 podium finishes. In retirement, Rosberg moved into driver management, television punditry, and became an eco-entrepreneur. He was awarded the Laureus World Sports Award for Breakthrough of the Year and was inducted into the FIA Hall of Fame in 2017.

== Personal background and education ==
Rosberg was born on 27 June 1985 at the Red Cross Hospital in Wiesbaden, West Germany, the only child of German interpreter Gesine "Sina" (née Gleitsmann-Dengel) and Finnish racing driver Keke Rosberg, who won the 1982 Formula One World Championship. Because his father is Finnish and his mother is German, Rosberg is a citizen of both countries, competing with a Finnish racing license until after his first season in the Formula 3 Euro Series. He switched to a German license as he felt it was easier to obtain major sponsorship agreements with nationality of a larger country.

Rosberg was raised in the Wiesbaden district of Nordenstadt in the first four weeks of his life, before living between the principality of Monaco and the Spanish island of Ibiza. He was educated at the International School of Nice and the International School of Monaco. Rosberg was encouraged to pursue ventures in academia and sports. He was taught five languages: English, French, German, Italian and Spanish, but not Finnish or Swedish, as his father considered those other languages more important for Nico's life and career. Rosberg enjoyed studying mathematics and science, and passed all of his examinations except history. He graduated with an average grade of 1.2 in 2002.

Rosberg married interior designer Vivian Sibold at a civil ceremony in Monaco on 11 July 2014. They have two children, and run a creamery shop in Ibiza. He is a fan of the German football club Bayern Munich, played for the Monaco national tennis team, and formerly competed in triathlon events; these skills allowed him to save a five-year-old child from drowning in Monaco.

== Karting (1991–2001) ==
At the age of four, Rosberg had his first driving experience when his father took him to a go-kart track in Ibiza for a holiday. He steered a Jeep, and his father controlled its speed with the accelerator and the brake pedals. Rosberg began competitive racing at the age of six and decided to aim for a career in Formula One motor racing after he observed his father competing in the Deutsche Tourenwagen Meisterschaft in 1995. His parents, who did not discourage their son's career choice, consented on the condition that he maintained good grades at school. Rosberg's competitive mindset, and his early achievements in go-karting helped him to improve his driving ability and to convince his father to manage him.

In 1996, Rosberg won the Côte d'Azur Mini-Kart Regional Championship, and the Trophee Jérôme Bernard and the Trophee de France in 1997. Aged 12, he was the youngest champion of a French national karting series. Rosberg finished second in the French Manufacturers' Trophy and the Côte d'Azur Regional Championship in the same year. He progressed to the European karting championships for 1998 after moving from France to Italy so he could enter international events. Competing in the 100 Junior category in a CRG kart, Rosberg finished fifth at the 28° Torneo Industrie, seventh in the Andrea Margutti Trophy, and crashed out in the 1998 CIK-FIA Green Helmet Trophy. In 1999, he was runner-up in the Italian Junior Karting Championship and was fourth in the ICA Junior CIK-FIA European Championship, again driving a CRG.

Rosberg's father asked CRG executive Dino Chiesa in late 1999 to establish a separate karting team for his son and fellow driver Lewis Hamilton for a period of two to three years. Rosberg raced for TeamMBM.com (Mercedes-Benz McLaren) for the 2000 season. (Note: Neither Mercedes-Benz nor McLaren officially recognised TeamMBM.com, and its website was a holding page.) In Formula A, he was runner-up in the CIK-FIA European Championship and finished ninth in the World Cup. In 2001, Rosberg was tenth in the South Garda Winter Cup and sixteenth in the Formula Super A World Championship. He concluded his karting career with a third-place finish in the latter series at a race in Kerpen.

== Junior car career (2001–2005) ==
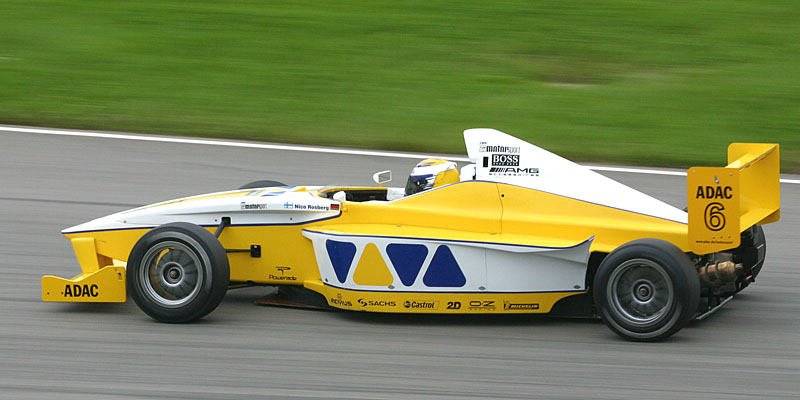
Rosberg in his 2002 Formula BMW ADAC title-winning campaign

At the age of 16, Rosberg progressed to car racing, competing in three races for the 2001 Formula BMW Junior Cup Iberia finishing in 18th in the Drivers' Championship with 38 points. For his first full season of car racing, he drove for VIVA Racing in the 2002 Formula BMW ADAC Championship, winning the drivers' title with nine victories from twenty races and amassing 264 points. For winning the title, Rosberg drove a Williams FW24 at a test session at the Circuit de Catalunya on 3 December. At the time, he became the youngest person ever to drive a Formula One car.

The 2003 season saw Rosberg progress to the higher-tier Formula 3 Euro Series with Team Rosberg. Driving a Dallara F303-Opel car, he won once at the Bugatti Circuit and took five podium finishes for eighth in the Drivers' Championship with 45 points. He was second in the Rookie Cup to Christian Klien. In November 2003, Rosberg was given a test in a Formula 3000 car at the Circuito de Jerez by Paolo Coloni, the team owner of Scuderia Coloni, as preparation for future F1 testing with Williams. That same month, he entered the Macau Grand Prix and the Korea Super Prix with Carlin Motorsport, finishing 11th in Korea. Rosberg tested twice more for Williams in a modified FW25A car at the Circuit de Catalunya in December and January 2004 for them to evaluate his ability as a test driver.

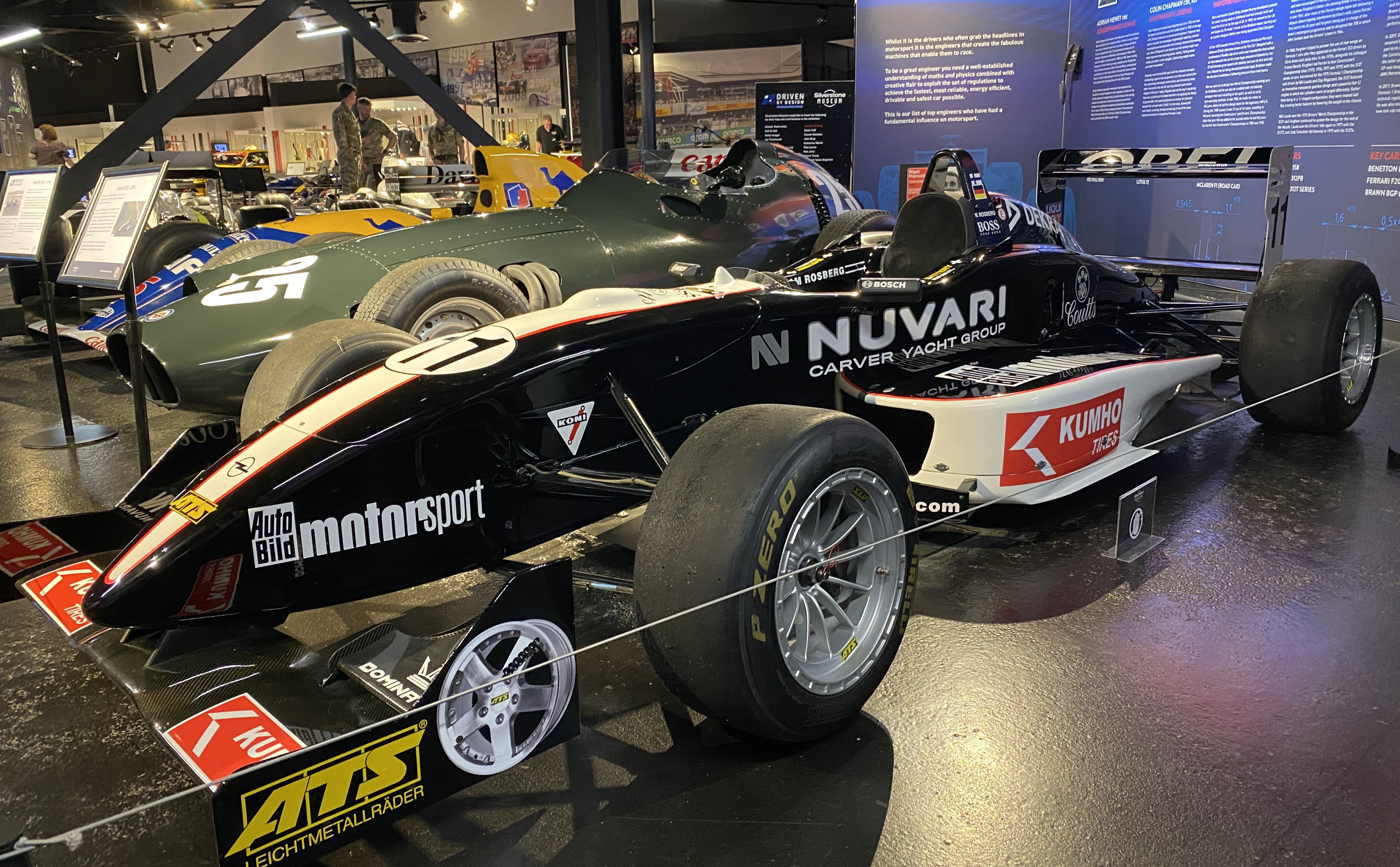
Rosberg's 2004 Formula 3 Euro Series car

Rosberg remained with Team Rosberg for the 2004 Formula 3 Euro Series. Before that, Rosberg won two rounds of the Spanish Formula 3 Winter Series at the Circuito de Albacete as preparation. He won the season's first two races at the Hockenheimring and his campaign faltered through incidents and accidents: he took one other victory at the Nürburgring and three podium finishes. Rosberg finished fourth in the Drivers' Championship with 70 points and was sixth at the Masters of Formula 3. He later crashed from the lead of the Macau Grand Prix in November and was second at the Bahrain Superprix a month later.

In the off-season, Rosberg passed an interview for acceptance into Imperial College London, a university where several Formula One designers were educated, to study aeronautical engineering. Rosberg chose not to further his education so as to be able to commit to his racing career; the university would have allowed him to combine the course with his racing. Rosberg's father did not overturn the decision. For the inaugural GP2 Series season in 2005, Rosberg wanted to drive for BCN Competicion due to its form in the 2004 International Formula 3000 Championship. ART Grand Prix founders Nicolas Todt and Frédéric Vasseur used a sales presentation to persuade him to race for their squad; he paid around £850,000 to drive for the team.

Rosberg achieved his first series victory in the sprint race at the Circuit de Nevers Magny-Cours and won the feature races at Silverstone Circuit and the Hockenheimring from pole position. He took the Drivers' Championship lead with a third-place finish in the feature race at the Circuit de Spa-Francorchamps when previous leader Heikki Kovalainen took eighth. Rosberg maintained the points lead during the season-ending Bahrain International Circuit round, winning both races to claim the first GP2 Series title with 120 points.

== Formula One career (2005–2016) ==
=== Williams (2005–2009) ===
==== 2005 ====
In April 2005, Rosberg was signed by Williams as its second test driver. He and fellow driver Nelson Piquet Jr. were analysed extensively before Rosberg was selected. He worked with Williams's test and reserve driver Antônio Pizzonia and continued to focus on the GP2 Series. After race driver Nick Heidfeld was injured in a bicycle accident in September, Rosberg was shortlisted by Williams as his potential replacement for the final two races, the Japanese Grand Prix and the Chinese Grand Prix. The team opted for Pizzonia because they did not want to risk delaying Rosberg's career by one to two years if he had a poor performance.

==== 2006–2007 ====
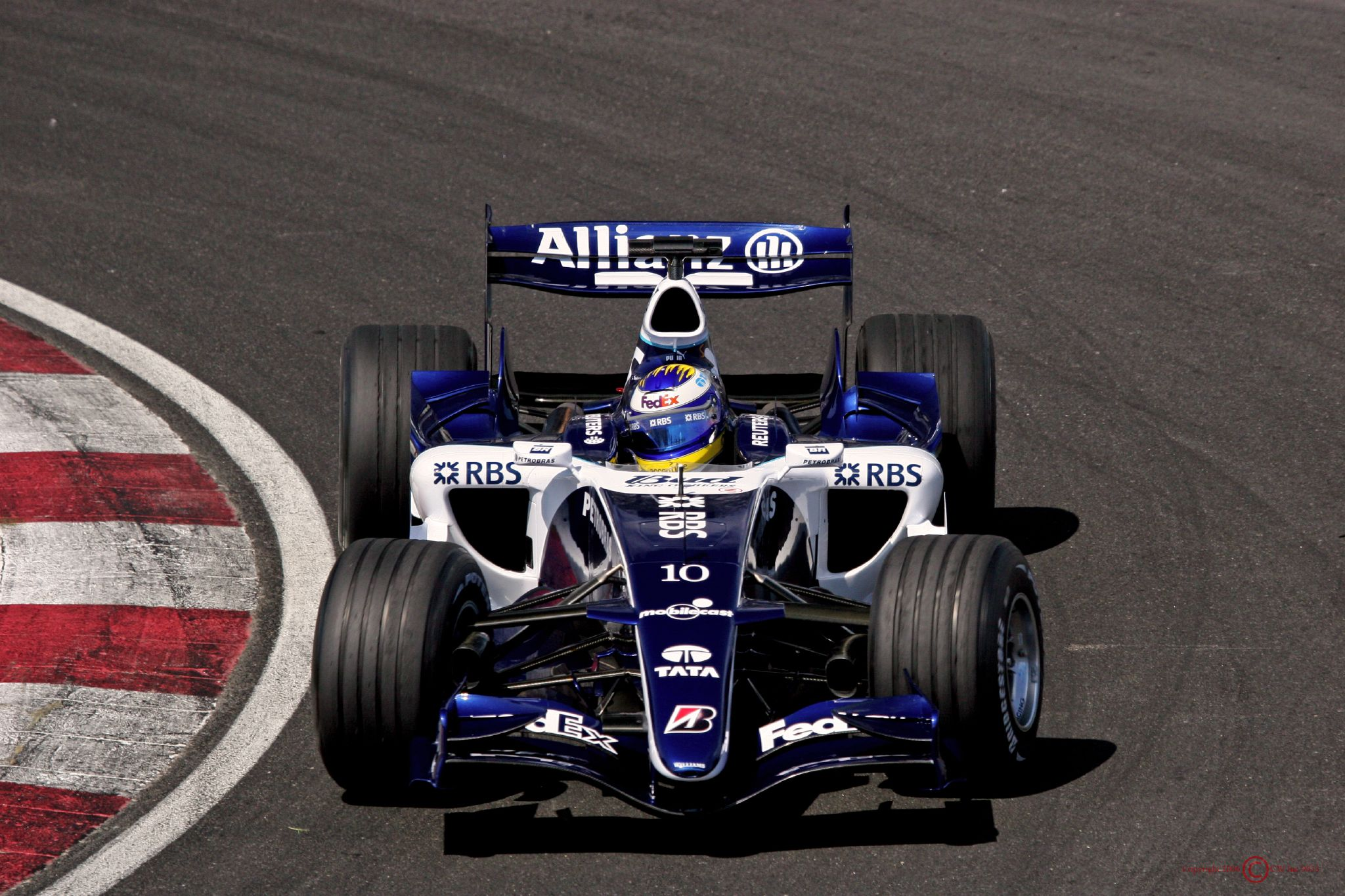
Rosberg at the 2006 Canadian Grand Prix

Bernie Ecclestone, Formula One's commercial rights owner, said to Williams team principal and founder Frank Williams he thought it would be advantageous to sign Rosberg as part of a campaign to bring energetic drivers to the sport. Williams told Rosberg in October 2005 that he was assured of a role on the team as either a racer or test driver for 2006 after British American Racing's Jenson Button was released from a contract with the team. Autosport reported Rosberg signed a contract that month to race for Williams in 2006 allowing the team to provide him with as much car acclimatisation as possible. The following month, Rosberg signed a five-year contract with Williams, being selected by Frank Williams for his driving ability, his knowledge of Formula One technology, and for articulately communicating data to engineers. He was told of the news by his father in advance.

Rosberg was paid £500,000 by Williams and was the first son of a former world champion in Formula One since Damon Hill in 1999. To prepare for the season, he achieved the highest score ever in Williams's Engineering Aptitude Test, which tests a new driver's knowledge of car mechanics and engineering aspects of Formula One, (Note: The test, which was written up by the technical director Sam Michael, focused on driving with understeer and oversteer, adjusting the differential and solving issues with the car.) and ceased reading the news to avoid becoming angered by negative publicity. Tony Ross was assigned as his race engineer. At the season-opening Bahrain Grand Prix, Rosberg scored his first career points with a seventh-place finish and set the race's fastest lap, becoming at the time the youngest fastest lap setter in history, aged 20 years, 8 months and 13 days. (Note: The current holder of this record is Max Verstappen, who set the fastest lap of the Brazilian Grand Prix when he was 19 years and 44 days.) One week later, at the Malaysian Grand Prix, he achieved a season-best start of third before his engine failed after seven laps. He scored points once more during the season with a seventh at the European Grand Prix as he made driver errors from inexperience and drove an unreliable car. Rosberg was outpaced by his teammate Mark Webber, with whom he had a good relationship. He finished with four points for 17th in the World Drivers' Championship (WDC).

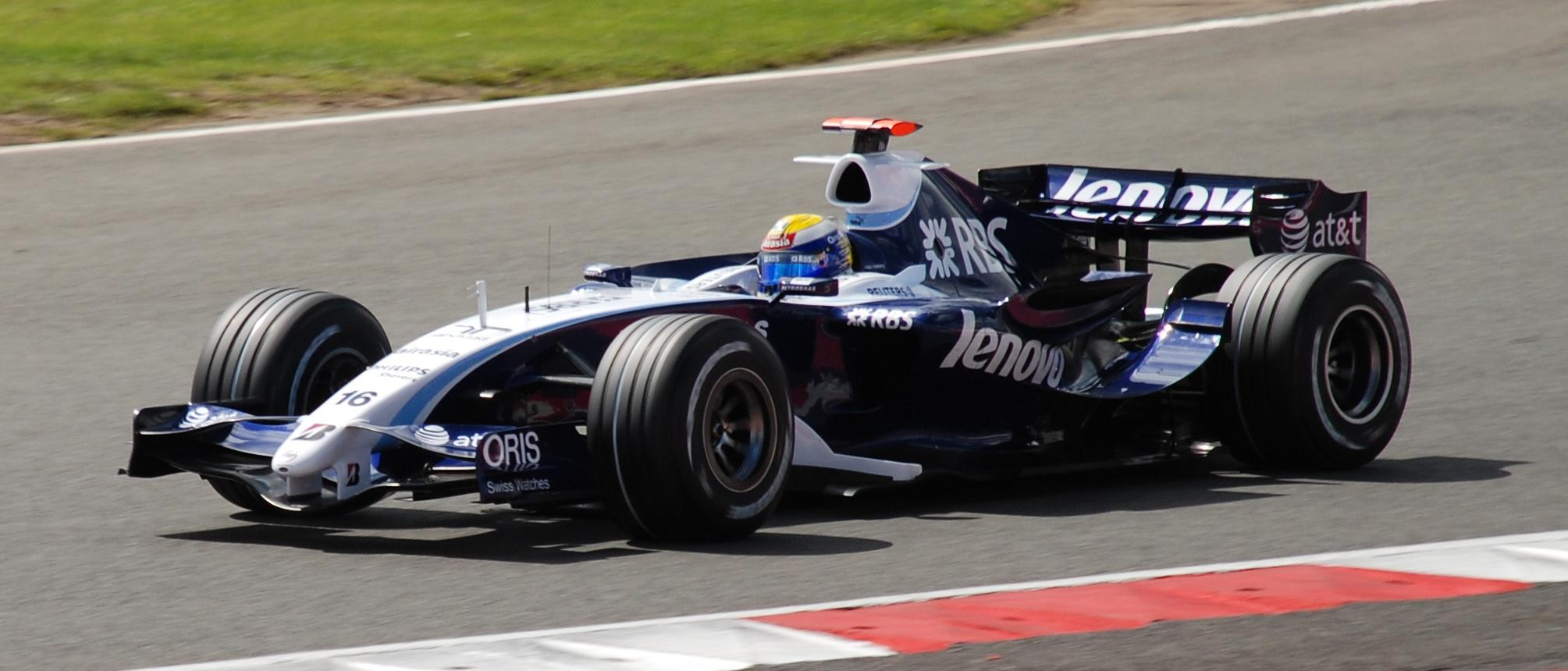
Rosberg driving at the 2007 British Grand Prix

For 2007, Rosberg was partnered by the more experienced Alexander Wurz. He and his father mutually agreed to stop working with each other, and began working with a sports psychologist. Rosberg's performances improved greatly from 2006 due to Williams restructuring itself and employing more experienced and capable personnel, making his FW29 car reliable and more efficient with the installation of a less complex seamless transmission. He had more confidence in setting up the car to his liking, extracting additional speed and balance consistently. Rosberg also gained experience in controlling his emotions without losing speed, frequently qualified ahead of Wurz and took points seven times with a season-best of fourth at the season-ending Brazilian Grand Prix. Rosberg scored 20 points for ninth in the WDC.

Rosberg's performances throughout the season enhanced his reputation, and he was linked to several teams for 2008. McLaren offered Frank Williams "majestic proportions" to sign Rosberg to replace the outgoing two-time world champion Fernando Alonso, but Williams immediately rejected the offer. Rosberg's contract was extended to the end of 2009 on the basis of where Williams finished in the Constructors' Championship. Rosberg later told Williams of his desire to remain with them on the condition he would receive a competitive car. (Note: Rosberg's father was not enthusiastic about his son being teammates with Lewis Hamilton because the latter had outperformed him in karting and the Formula 3 Euro Series.)

==== 2008–2009 ====
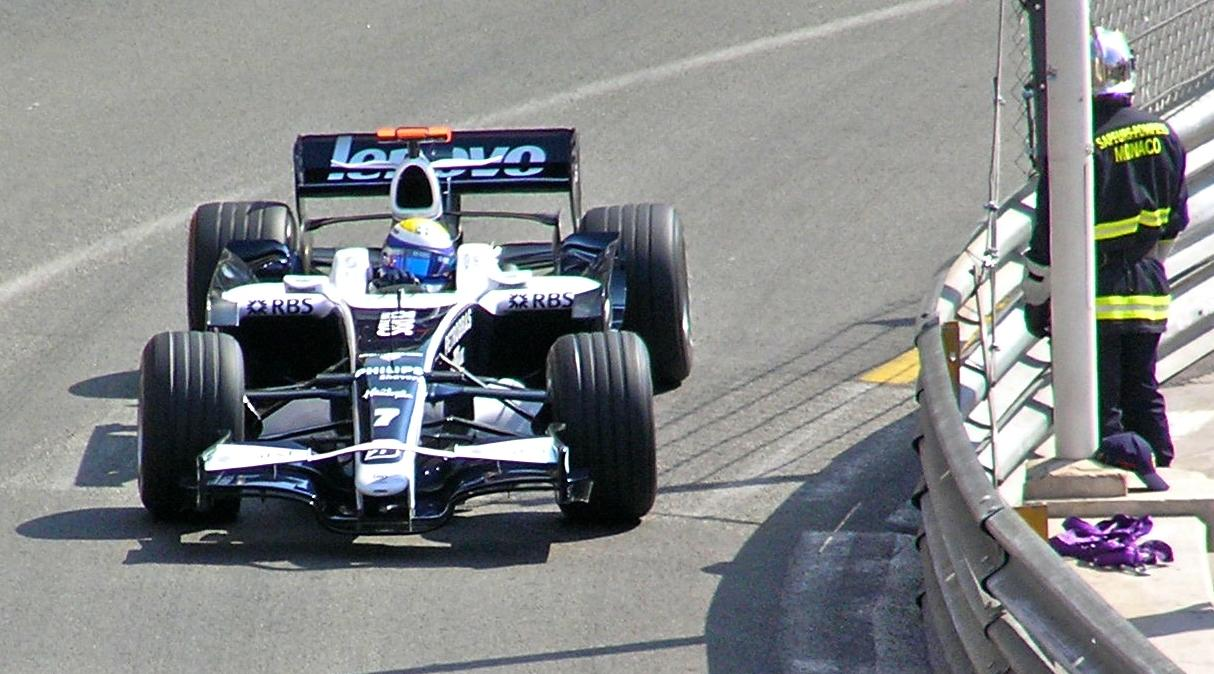
Rosberg driving in the 2008 Monaco Grand Prix

The 2008 season was the first in which Rosberg was the more experienced driver on his team, being partnered by Williams test driver Kazuki Nakajima. He began the season by finishing third at the Australian Grand Prix, the first podium finish of his career. Afterwards, his campaign faltered because the FW30 car lacked outright performance and Williams did not develop the car fast enough for it to be competitive. Rosberg was occasionally outperformed by Nakajima, and driver errors lost him chances to score more points; he was able to adapt to a ban on traction control from Formula One. He improved the best result of his career with a second at the inaugural Singapore Grand Prix 14 races later, and finished 13th in the WDC with 17 points.

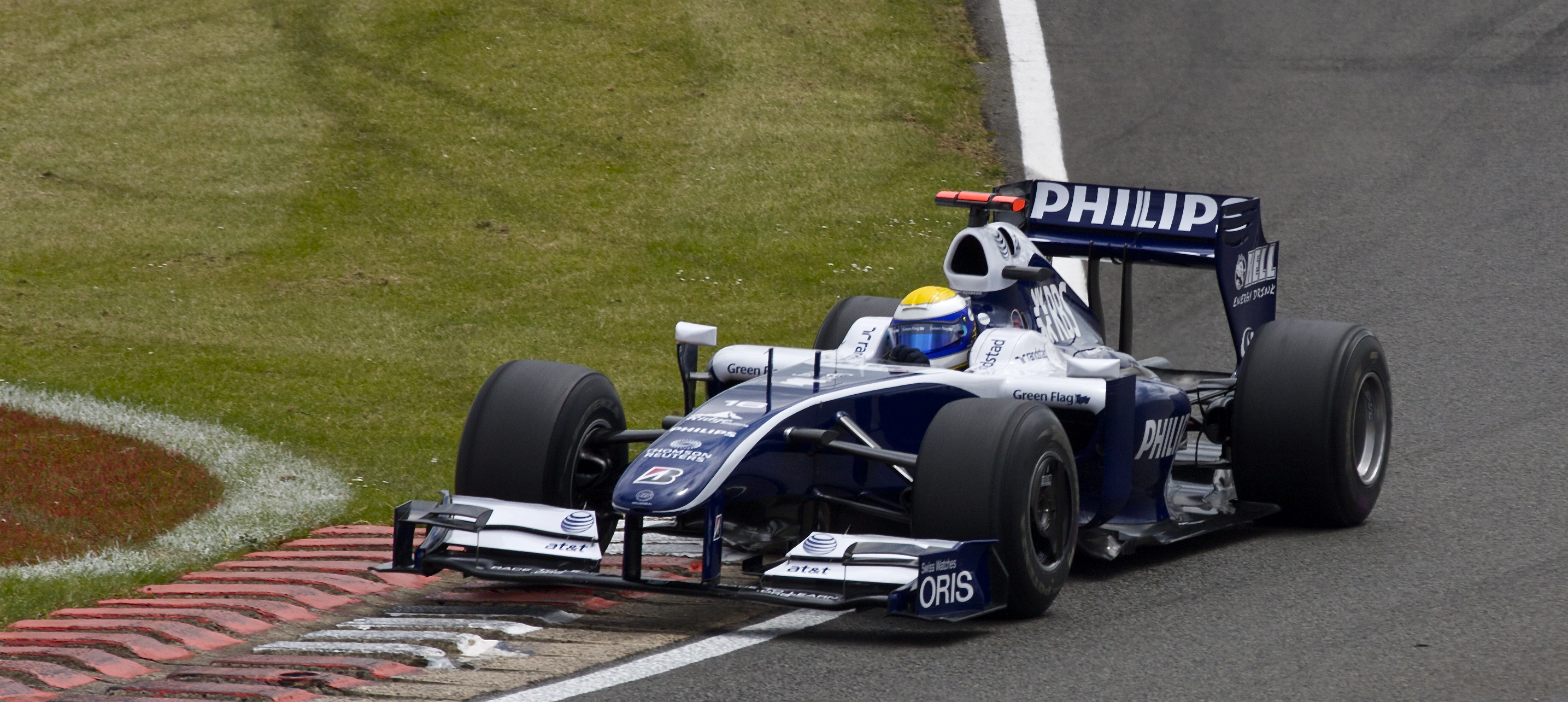
Rosberg competing at the 2009 British Grand Prix

Rosberg was again partnered with Nakajima for the 2009 season. He lost five percent of his body weight to compensate for the introduction of the kinetic energy recovery systems increasing the car's minimum weight limit to 605 kg (1,334 lb). Rosberg had an improved season: the Williams FW31 was one of three cars to have an early speed advantage because it featured a double diffuser system and Rosberg led the first 15 laps of the Malaysian Grand Prix, however, the team could not sustain the car's pace of development. He finished 16 of 17 rounds; the exception was the Brazilian Grand Prix. Rosberg was consistent in finishing in the points-paying positions, achieving a season-best result of fourth at the German Grand Prix and the following Hungarian Grand Prix. He scored 34.5 points for seventh in the WDC.

=== Mercedes (2010–2016) ===
==== 2010–2012 ====
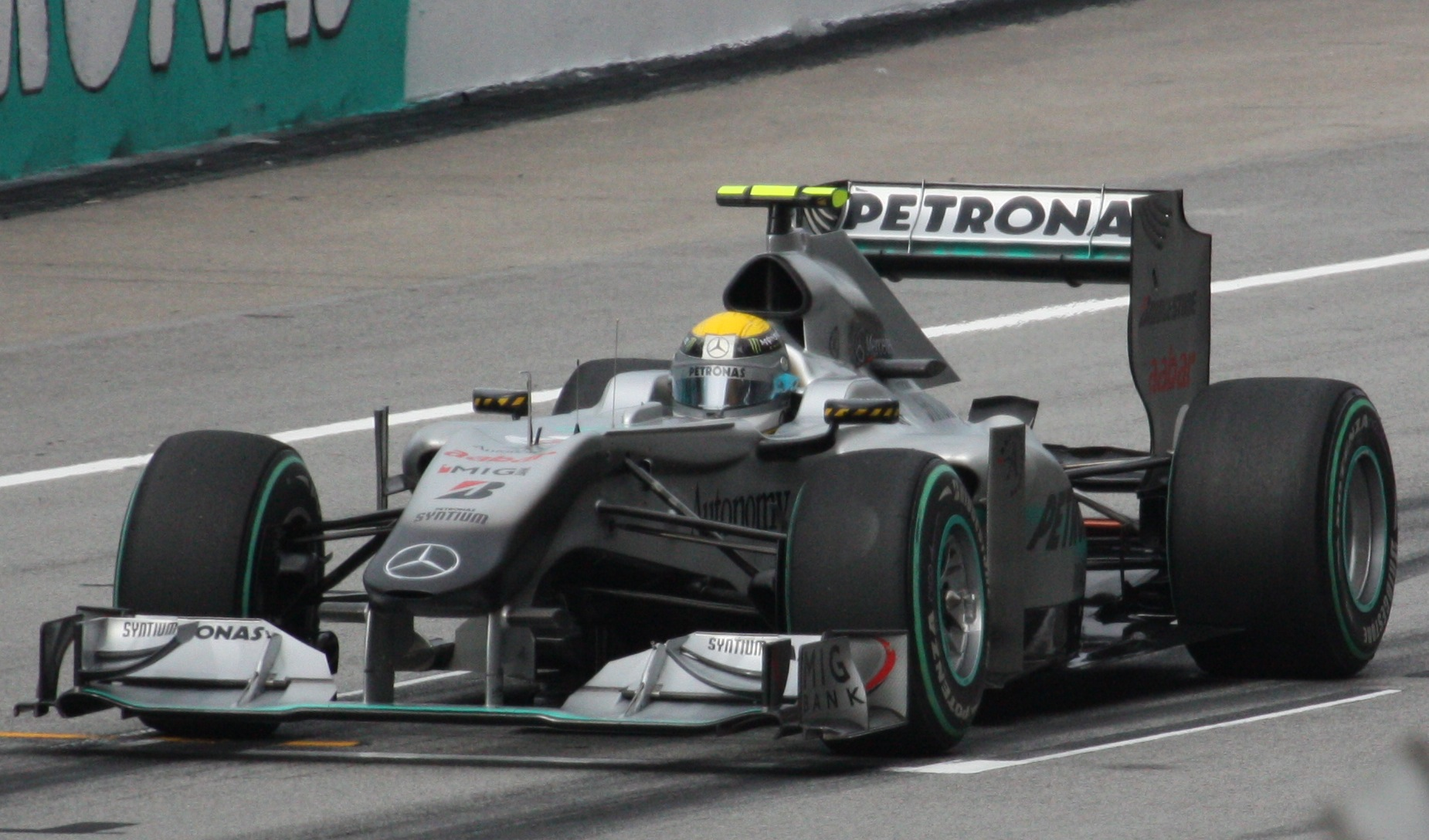
Rosberg at the start of the 2010 Malaysian Grand Prix

In mid-to-late 2009, Mercedes-Benz vice-president of motorsport Norbert Haug discussed with Rosberg the possibility of driving for the manufacturer in 2010 pending its acquisition of Brawn GP. Rosberg also talked to McLaren and Williams about potential employment; he was sceptical because Williams was mulling over whether Renault or Cosworth should be the team's engine supplier. On 29 October, he confirmed his departure from Williams at the conclusion of the season and was officially released from his contract with the team on 1 January 2010. One week later Mercedes purchased 75 percent of Brawn GP and entered Formula One under its own name, employing Rosberg to drive for the team. He was partnered with the seven-time world champion Michael Schumacher and was assigned car No. 4 after Schumacher requested No. 3 for superstitious reasons.

Rosberg was mentored by Mercedes team principal Ross Brawn and was apprehensive when Schumacher joined the team, given the history of Brawn and Schumacher's relationship at Ferrari. He was concerned that Schumacher would dominate the team, and in early strategy meetings, found that his own strategy was being discussed with Schumacher more than with him. He felt that Schumacher was constantly acting to cause him minor stress or to assert dominance.

Rosberg finished in third place at the Malaysian Grand Prix, the Chinese Grand Prix, and the British Grand Prix. He scored championship points in all but four rounds; he generally finished higher than he qualified and did so against his teammate Schumacher fifteen times to four that season. He was better able than Schumacher to cope with a terminal understeer affecting the MGP W01's handling due to Mercedes forgoing much development work on the car because of Brawn GP's title focus the previous year. The car was five-tenths of a second slower on most circuits. Rosberg was seventh in the WDC with 142 points. His performances during the season enhanced his reputation as a consistent and fast driver.

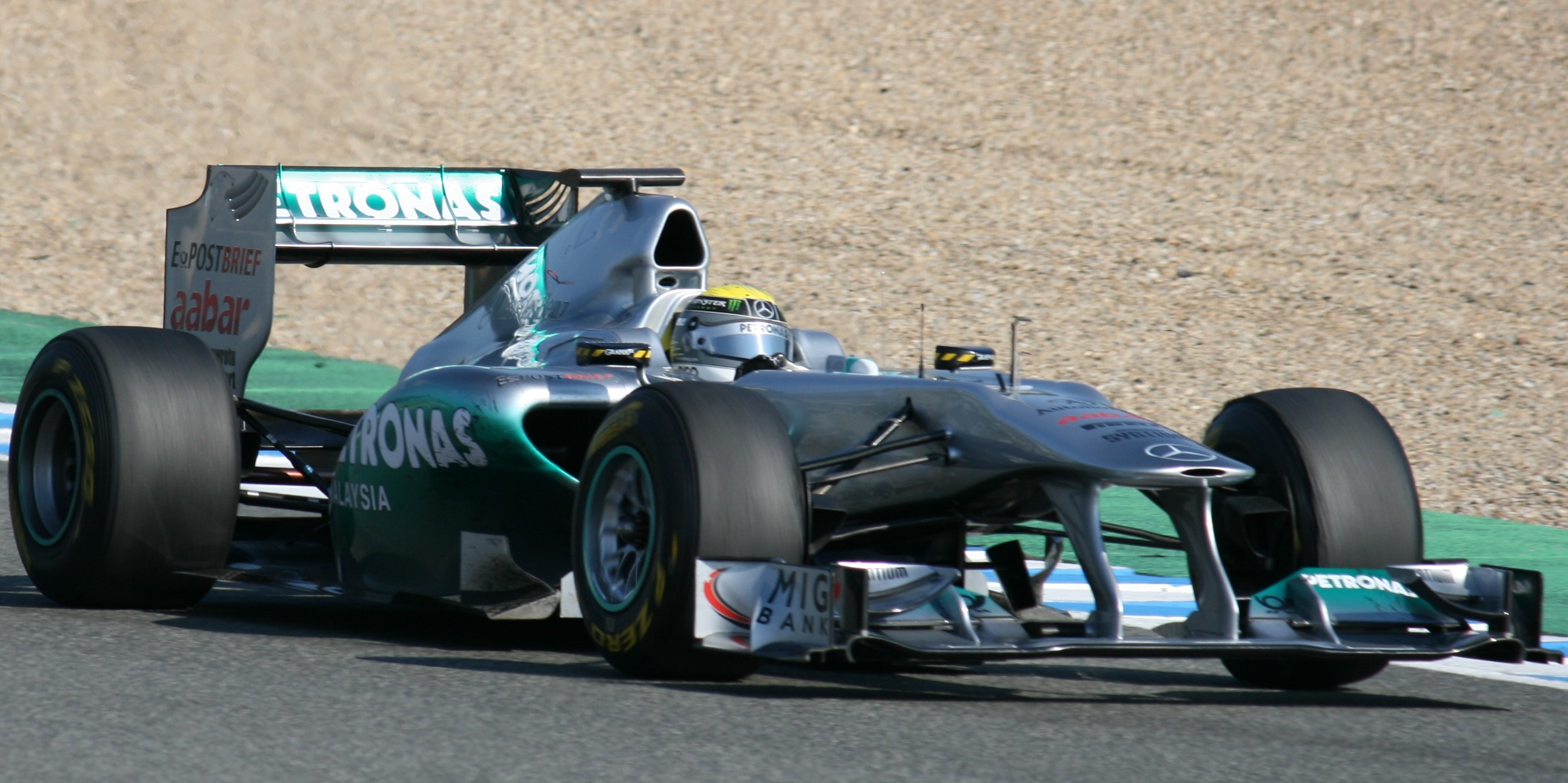
Rosberg testing at the Circuito de Jerez in February 2011

Rosberg remained with Mercedes for 2011 and was again joined by Schumacher. He had a mixed season: he led the Chinese Grand Prix and the Belgian Grand Prix, but the MGP W02 wore the Pirelli tyres quickly, making the car noncompetitive. Rosberg was able to maintain a consistent performance in every qualifying session and began higher than his teammate Schumacher sixteen times to three. He finished no higher than fifth in the season's 19 rounds and was seventh in the WDC with 89 points.

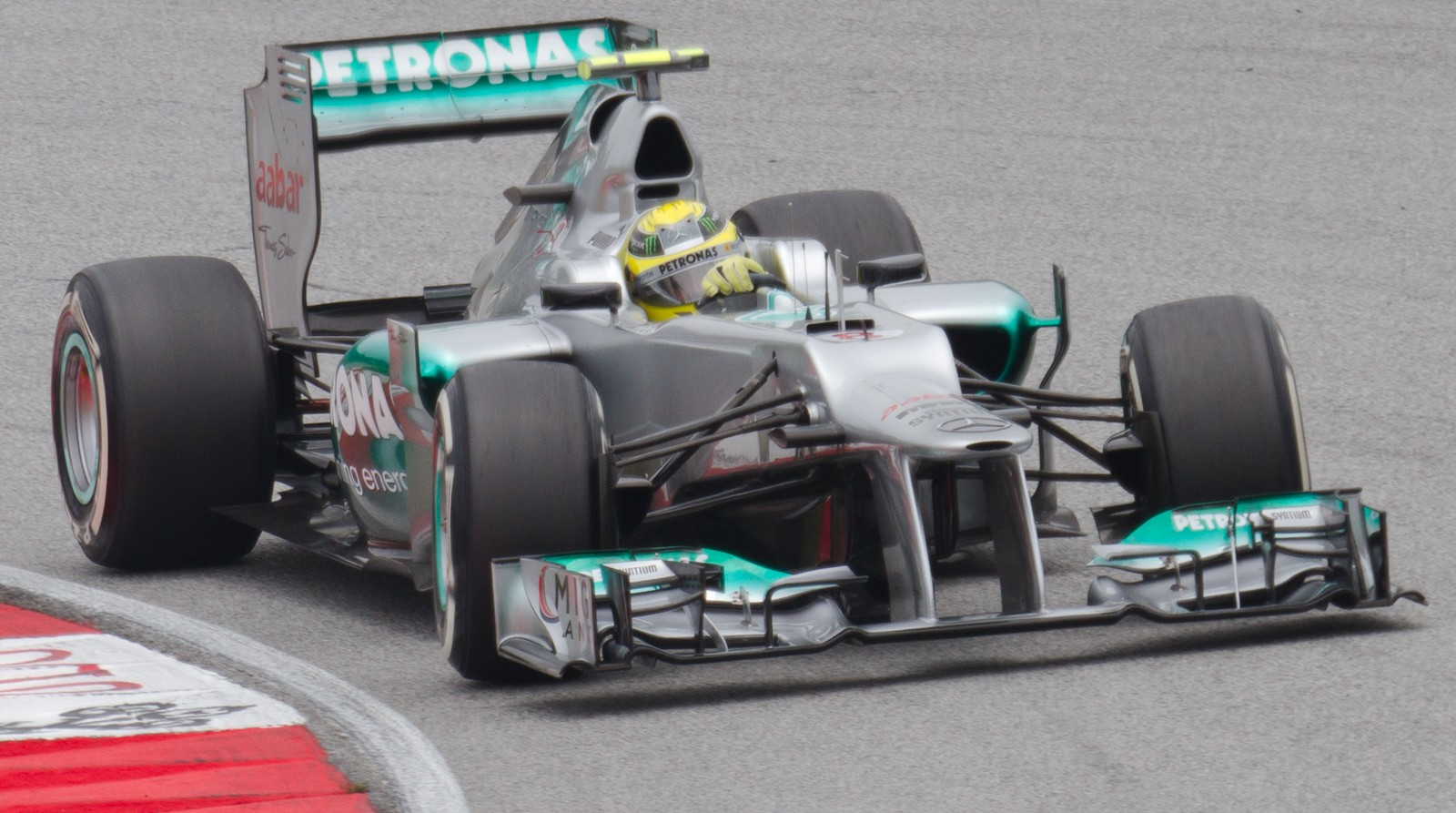
Rosberg driving at the 2012 Malaysian Grand Prix

The press linked Rosberg to replace the poor performing Felipe Massa at Ferrari for 2012. In November 2011, he signed a contract extension to remain at Mercedes until after 2013. An important factor in Rosberg's decision was the Mercedes team undergoing a technical restructure, which saw the appointments of Bob Bell as technical director and Geoff Willis as head of technology in mid-2011. Other reasons included his belief Mercedes would be able to improve their performance and challenge for race victories.

Three-time world champion Niki Lauda began to advise Rosberg. At the Chinese Grand Prix, the season's third round, he took the first pole position of his career and his maiden career victory. He then challenged Red Bull's Mark Webber for the victory at the Monaco Grand Prix three races later before he settled for a second-place finish. Rosberg had accumulated more championship points than any other driver in the season's previous four races and emerged as an unlikely contender for the WDC. Notwithstanding this, he achieved one further top-five finish during the season. However, he struggled to generate temperature into the rear tires on the Mercedes F1 W03 regardless of the climatic conditions, and the car was suited to circuits with slow-speed corners. He was ninth in the WDC with 93 points.

==== 2013–2016 ====
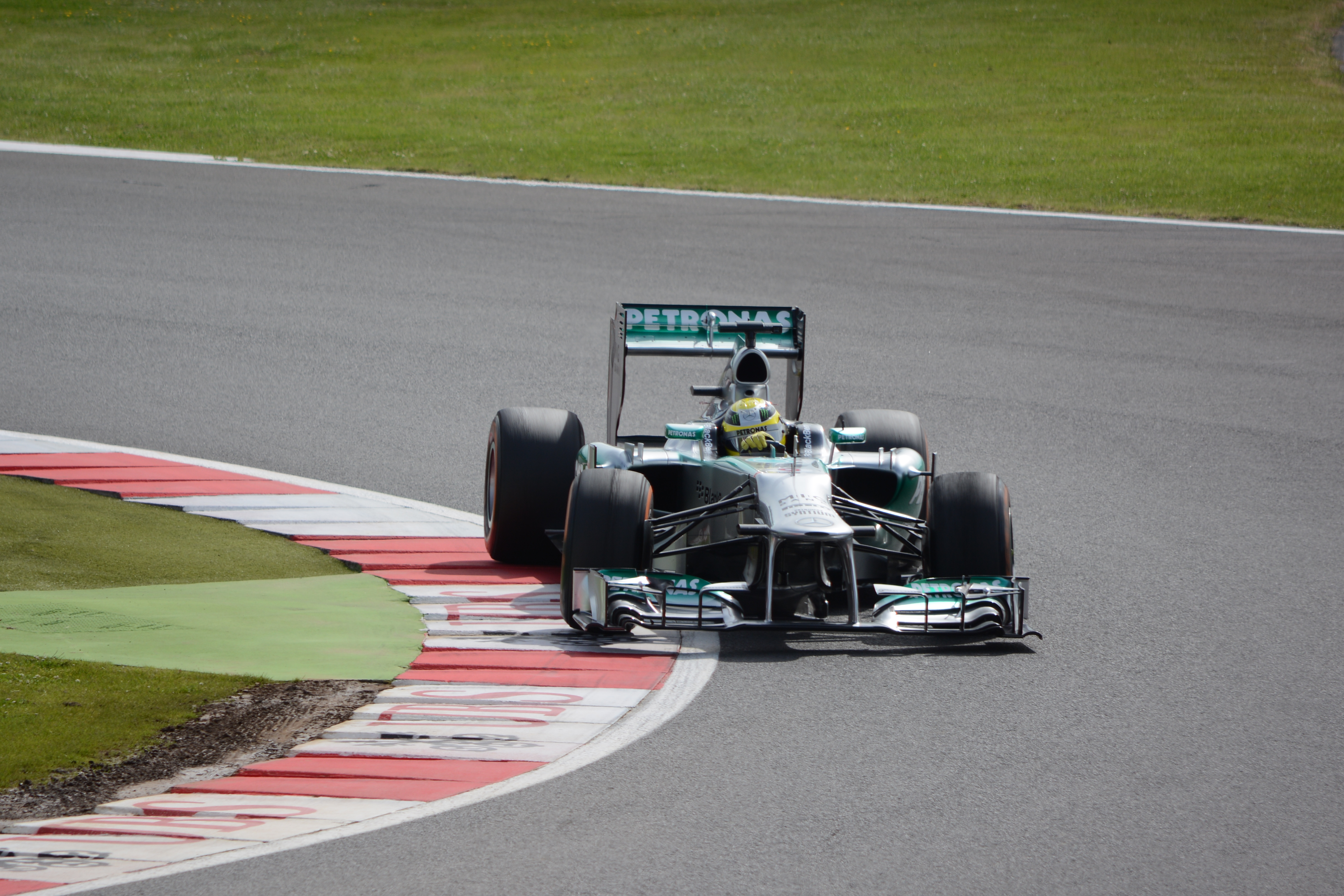
Rosberg took the third victory of his career at the 2013 British Grand Prix

==== 2013: Monaco and British victories ====
Before the 2013 season, Rosberg was joined at Mercedes by the 2008 world champion Lewis Hamilton, who replaced the retired Michael Schumacher. He was granted equal status by Mercedes and received no preferential treatment alongside Hamilton. During the pre-season period, Rosberg visited the Mercedes factory in Brackley, England, displaying a fascination with the F1 W04's technological development and assisting the team in the car's development.

Rosberg challenged his teammate Hamilton during the season qualifying higher eight times and finishing more often. At the Malaysian Grand Prix, the season's second race, a minor controversy came about when Mercedes invoked team orders on him to stay behind Hamilton. Unhappy with the decision, Rosberg led every lap from pole position to win the Monaco Grand Prix and became the first son of a world champion to win the event. He then won the British Grand Prix for his third career victory after Red Bull driver Sebastian Vettel suffered a broken gearbox. Thereafter, Rosberg earned points in nine of the season's ten final rounds with consecutive podium finishes— second at the Indian Grand Prix and third at the Abu Dhabi Grand Prix. He finished sixth in the WDC with 171 points and three pole positions. Rosberg's results over the season earned him additional respect within the Formula One community.

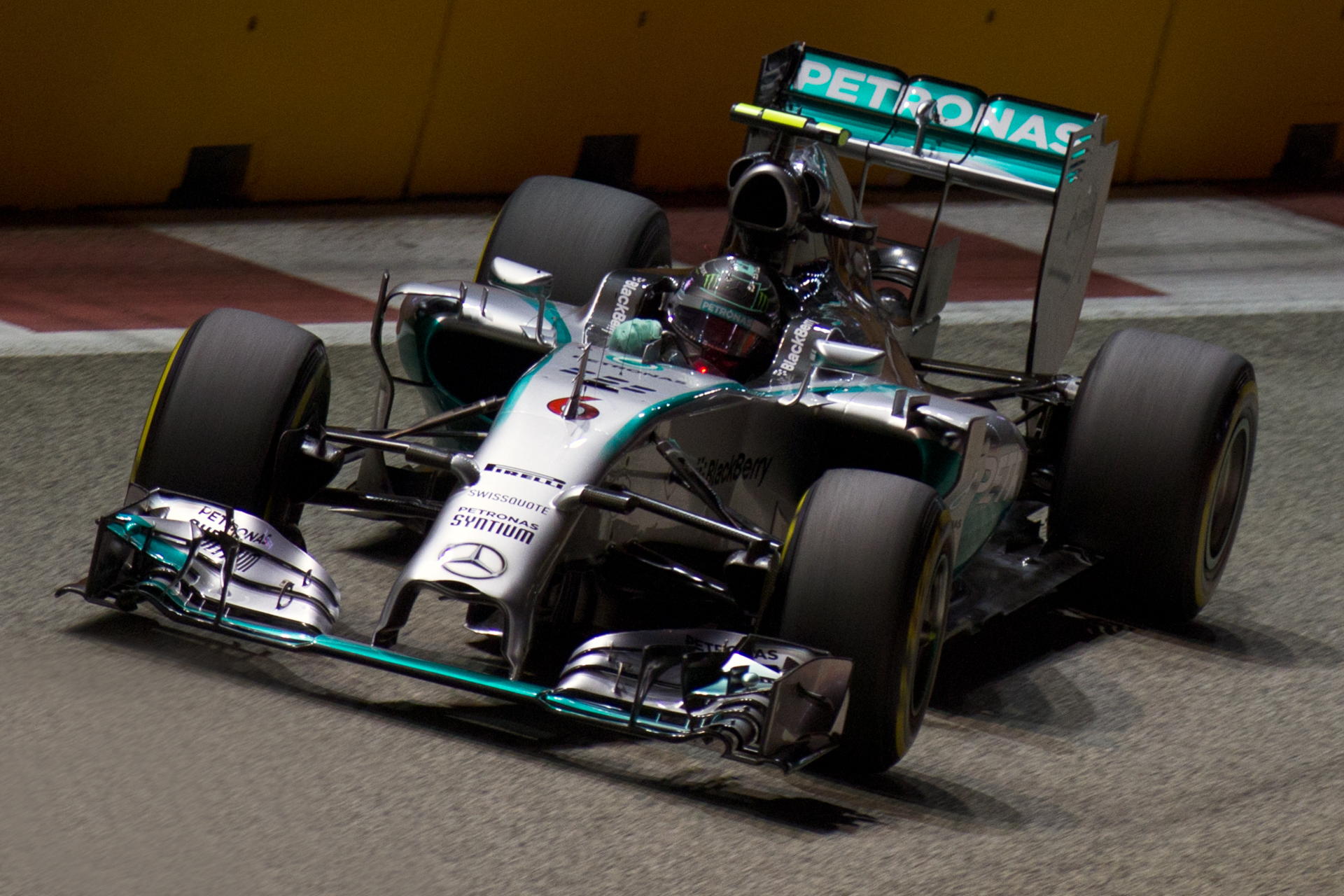
Rosberg during practice for the 2014 Singapore Grand Prix

==== 2014: Beginning of the Silver War and championship runner-up ====
Rosberg continued to drive for Mercedes in 2014 with Lewis Hamilton again as his teammate. He was regarded as a favourite for the WDC because of the team's development of the F1 W05 Hybrid car and adaptation to the technical regulations mandating the use of turbo-hybrid engines in pre-season testing at the Bahrain International Circuit and the Circuit de Barcelona-Catalunya. Rosberg won the Australian Grand Prix to take the lead of the WDC and finished second in the next four races but Hamilton's four straight victories lost Rosberg the championship lead. Rosberg won the Monaco Grand Prix for the second year in succession to regain the points lead after qualifying on pole position in contentious circumstances. Victories in Austria, Germany, followed by contact with Hamilton in Belgium made it appear he would win the championship, until a short circuit on his car in Singapore nullified his points lead. Rosberg took four consecutive podium finishes and won the Brazilian Grand Prix to ensure the championship would be decided at the season-ending Abu Dhabi Grand Prix. To win the title, he needed to win the race with Hamilton third or lower. Hamilton was already ahead of Rosberg on track and leading the race when an energy recovery system failure meant Rosberg scored no points for second in the WDC with 317 points.

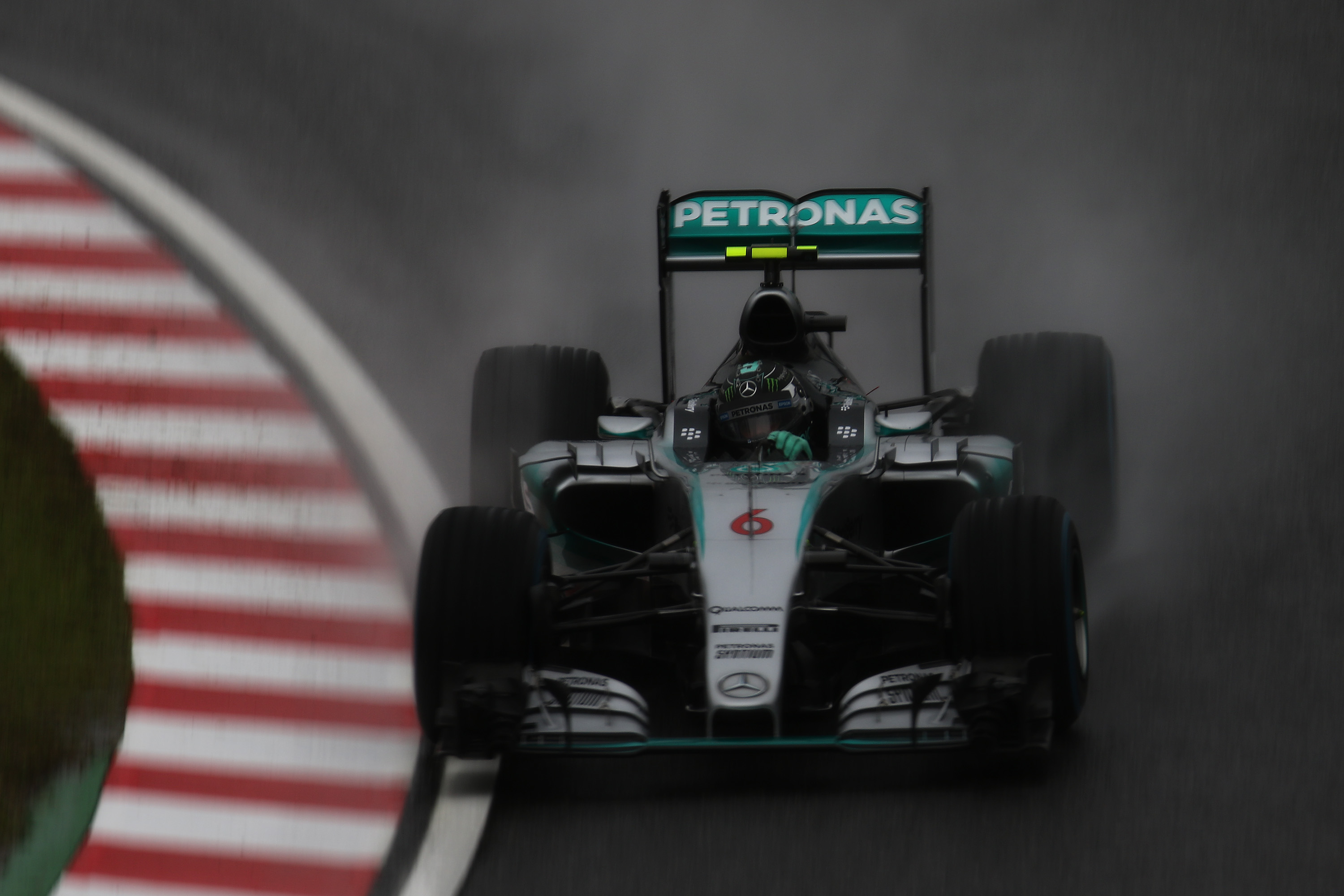
Rosberg at the 2015 Japanese Grand Prix

==== 2015: Championship runner-up again ====
Having signed a contract worth a reported €55 million with Mercedes that was due to expire at the conclusion of 2016, Rosberg continued to drive for the team in 2015. (Note: The leaked Panama Papers revealed that the contract was constructed with the law firm Mossack Fonseca administered company to restrict "liability law" risks and allow Rosberg to operate internationally. Neither Daimler nor Rosberg committed malice.) During the off-season he sought to correct a body deficiency, which caused him to hold his breath against g-forces in high-speed corners, since he did not want to limit the flow of oxygen to his brain and muscles. (Note: Rosberg studied the "marginal gains" theory employed by sports coaches Clive Woodward and Dave Brailsford.) After four top-three podium finishes in the first four races, he won in Spain, Monaco and Austria, which came as his overall performance lowered from focusing more on the race than on qualifying; Vettel threatened Rosberg's hold on second overall. Retirements in Italy and Russia and two errors on a wet track at the United States Grand Prix stopped him from taking the championship, but wins in the final three races in Mexico, Brazil and Abu Dhabi and six consecutive pole positions placed him runner-up overall with 322 points.

==== 2016: Champion at last in final Formula One season ====
Before the 2016 season, Rosberg stopped reading the news and studied sleep with a jet-lag doctor as he focused on his family and winning the next event. He altered his racing gloves to improve his starts, removed paint from his helmet to make it 80 g (2.8 oz) lighter that slightly improved his performance, employed a mental trainer to increase his aggression, and spent his spare time go-karting to maintain his ability. Rosberg eschewed Facebook for five months, studied philosophy, meditated to stay concentrated, and received detailed technical input from Mercedes's mechanics at its headquarters in Brackley, England. He worked with his sports psychologist for up to eight hours per week with two hours of mental discipline every two days. Rosberg said he was confident of driving a competitive car and wanted to maintain his form by beating Hamilton more regularly.

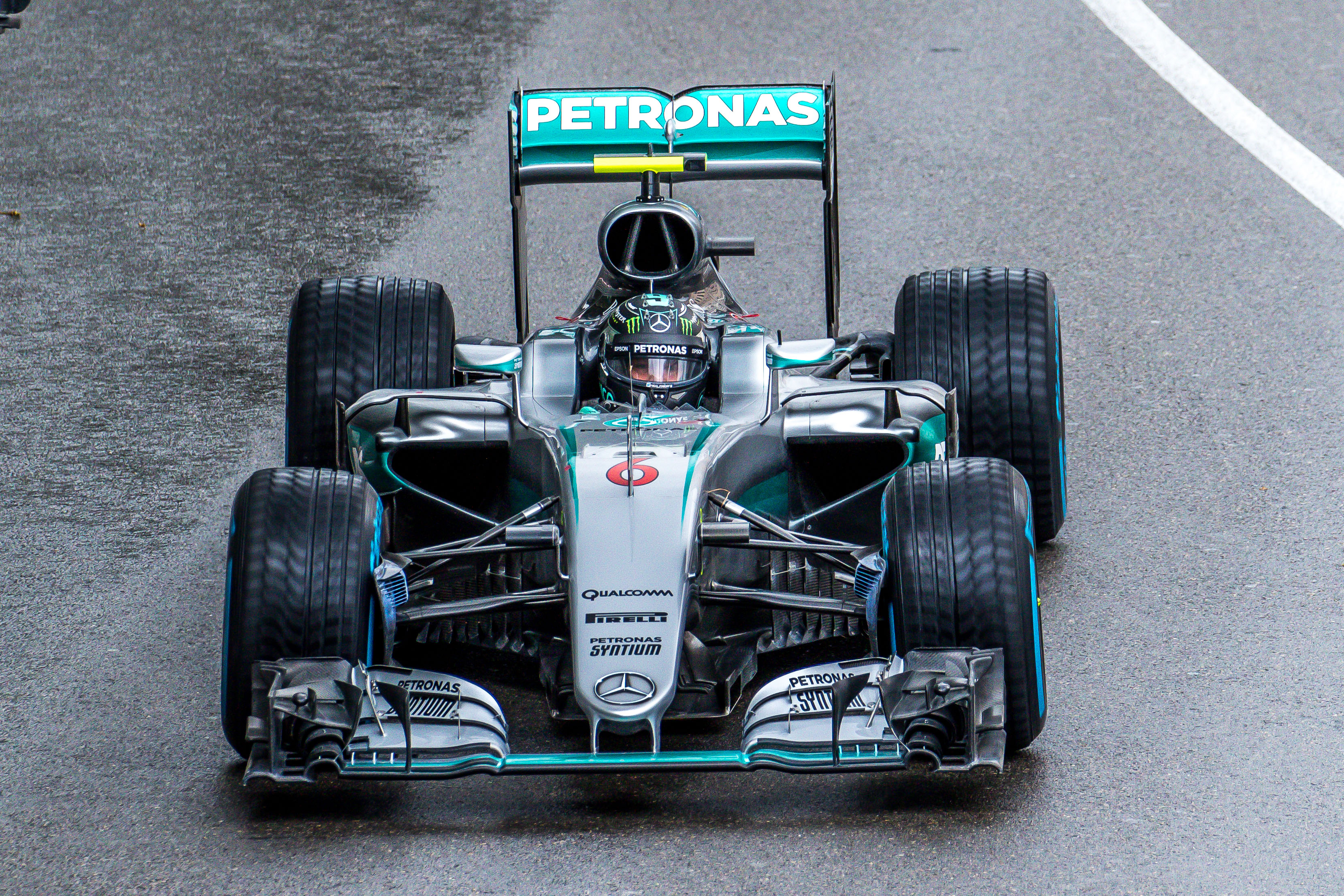
Rosberg competing at the 2016 Monaco Grand Prix

Rosberg carried over his form from end of the 2015 season, winning the first four races to lead Hamilton by 43 championship points although Hamilton suffered reliability issues in two of those first four races. Rosberg and Hamilton made high-speed contact at the Spanish Grand Prix after which Hamilton took the championship lead from Rosberg over the next eight races after sub-par results from the former. During the mid-season interval, Mercedes non-executive chairman Niki Lauda paid a special visit to Rosberg's home in Ibiza, to help Rosberg regain his confidence and to bounce back. Rosberg changed his diet to remove sugars from his body and abstained from alcohol. Rosberg mulled over how to further improve his performance; to avoid the strain of starting a diet, he refrained from cycling, losing 1 kg (2.2 lb) of muscle in both his legs. He went on to win in Belgium, Singapore and Japan, and achieved three-second-place finishes in a row to enter the season-ending Abu Dhabi Grand Prix leading Hamilton by 12 points.

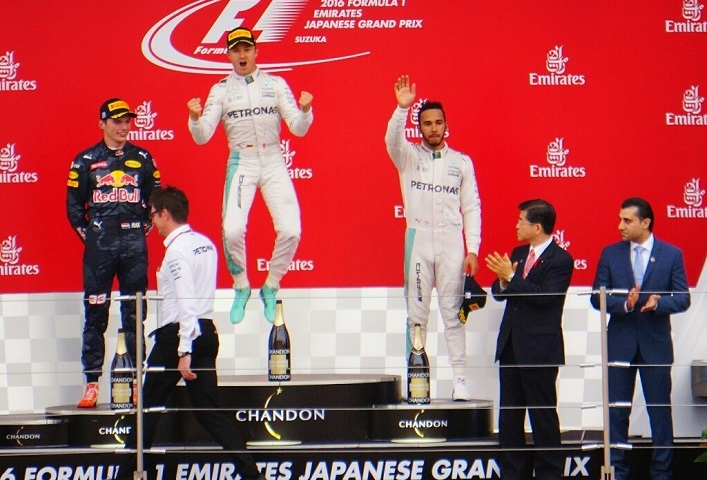
Rosberg at the 2016 Japanese Grand Prix

To win the championship, Rosberg needed to finish no worse than third, even if Hamilton won. He won the WDC by five points with a second-place finish after withstanding Hamilton's attempts to back him into the chasing pack and encourage drivers to pass Rosberg to claim the title for himself. Rosberg became the second son of a former world champion to win the title since Damon Hill replicated his father Graham Hill in 1996. He published a limited-edition book entitled Finally about the 2016 season on 24 December 2016. Overall, Rosberg competed in 206 races: he won 23, achieved 30 pole positions, gained 57 podium finishes, and scored 1594.5 championship points.

== Retirement from racing and subsequent ventures (2016–present) ==
(Germany) Rosberg X Racing
- Founded: October 2020; 6 years ago
- No.: 6
- Folded: 28 December 2024; 22 months ago
- Former series: Extreme E
- Current drivers: (Sweden) Johan Kristoffersson (Sweden) Mikaela Åhlin-Kottulinsky
- Noted drivers: (Australia) Molly Taylor
- Races: 24
- Wins: 9
- Podiums: 13
- Best qualifiers: 4
- Super sectors: 4
- Points: 421
- Teams' Championships: 2 (2021, 2023)
- Drivers' Championships: 2 (2021, 2023)
- First entry: 2021 Desert X-Prix
- Last entry: 2024 Hydro X-Prix II
- First win: 2021 Desert X-Prix
- Last win: 2024 Desert X-Prix I
- Website: https://www.rosbergxracing.com/

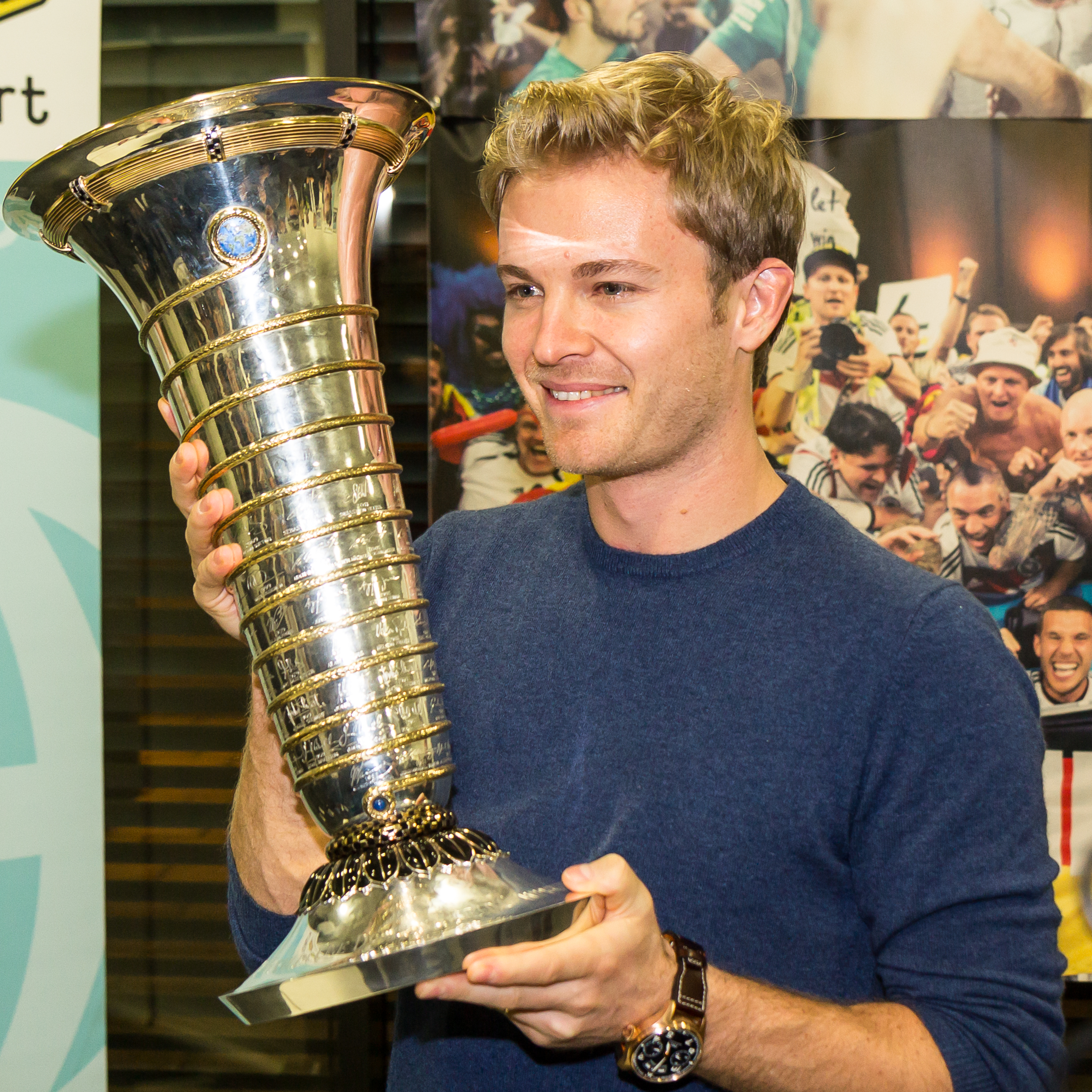
Rosberg holding the 2016 Formula One World Drivers' Championship trophy

Rosberg, who had signed a two-year contract extension with Mercedes to 2018 in mid-2016, began to contemplate retirement from motor racing when he considered the possibility of a championship win after the 2016 Japanese Grand Prix. He discussed it twice with his wife Vivian before the Abu Dhabi Grand Prix, and decided to commit to retiring before the race commenced. Afterwards, Rosberg told Vivian and manager Georg Noite that he would retire before telephoning the Mercedes team principal Toto Wolff about it. He did not tell Wolff in person because he was apprehensive about Wolff's reaction. At an FIA Prize Giving Ceremony in Vienna on 2 December 2016, five days after winning the championship, he made public his decision to retire. Rosberg said he had reached the "pinnacle" of his career; he did not want his driving skills to atrophy, and wished to spend more time with his young family. He was the first reigning champion to retire from Formula One since Alain Prost in 1993. Williams driver Valtteri Bottas replaced Rosberg at Mercedes.

In retirement, Rosberg's love of engineering and innovation saw him become an eco-entrepreneur, by investing in positive change to the environment and society. He used his celebrity status to advance the industry, beginning with a fact-finding visit to Silicon Valley, where he tested and observed the construction of electric and self-driving vehicles. In July 2017, he visited the headquarters of the all-electric Formula E racing series, and became fascinated in the e-mobility movement. Rosberg became a long-term investor and shareholder in Formula E in early 2018. Focusing primarily on Europe, Rosberg has invested in multiple start-up technology and e-mobility companies. He had the idea to launch the annual Greentech Festival trade fair, which he did with the entrepreneurs Sven Krüger and Marco Voigt in February 2019 to showcase sustainable technologies from around the world in Berlin. He replaced Frank Thelen as an investor on the German television programme Die Höhle der Löwen (The Lions' Cave) in late 2019. In 2022, Rosberg launched the non-profit organisation Rosberg Philanthropies that focuses on environmental protection and supporting children.

In October 2017, Rosberg joined Team Rosberg as an adviser for its ADAC GT Masters sports car championship team in 2018. He also joined the management team of the racing driver Robert Kubica that September. Rosberg assisted in Kubica's desire to return to Formula One after a severe 2011 rally accident left the latter with partial movement in his right arm. He reduced his involvement with Kubica in April 2018 to focus on his business career. Since the 2018 season, Rosberg has analysed select Formula One races for Sky Sports F1 in the United Kingdom, RTL in Germany, and Sky Italia in Italy. He impressed viewers for conveying digestible information to them. That same year, Rosberg co-founded the Rosberg Young Drivers Academy with karting mentor Dino Chiesa to scout and support young go-kart drivers. In April 2019, Rosberg declined an offer from the Head of Audi Motorsport Dieter Gass to drive an RS5 DTM as a wild-card entrant in the Deutsche Tourenwagen Masters (DTM) because he did not feel fit enough to return to racing.

In late 2020, Rosberg established Rosberg X Racing (RXR) formed on parts of the structure of his father's DTM team to compete in the all-electric SUV off-road racing series Extreme E from the 2021 season on. He entered the series because of its promised racing action and wanted to help combat some of climate change's effects collectively. RXR won the inaugural Extreme E constructors' title with drivers Johan Kristoffersson and Molly Taylor as drivers' champions. The team narrowly missed out on retaining the constructors' title in 2022 by two points to Lewis Hamilton's Team X44. In December 2024, Rosberg announced that RXR would cease operations in Extreme E as the racing series will be replaced as Extreme H for 2025.

Rosberg has a YouTube vlogging channel, and hosts the podcast "Beyond Victory" in which he discusses human performance and development with his guests.

== Personality and driving style ==
Journalists describe Rosberg as articulate, one who speaks with "Germanic precision" and has "more than a hint of canny PR-iness, distributing praise with diligent equality and seasoning his narrative with caveats when required." He has avoided appearing to be courageous to impress others, and some saw him as detrimental to Formula One's goal to attract new fans due to a perceived lack of personality and his commitment to fitness. Nicknamed "Britney" after the singer Britney Spears by his colleagues at Williams for sporting blonde hair, Rosberg is shy in private, reserved, quiet, and has a dry and sarcastic wit, which has occasionally "played out with a deft finesse." He has been called charming, shrewd, intelligent, focused, and photogenic. Rosberg prefers to be challenged for structuring, and is an avid reader of books that further his knowledge. His wealthy and cosmopolitan Monegasque upbringing, coupled with his polyglotism led him to describe himself as an "International German."

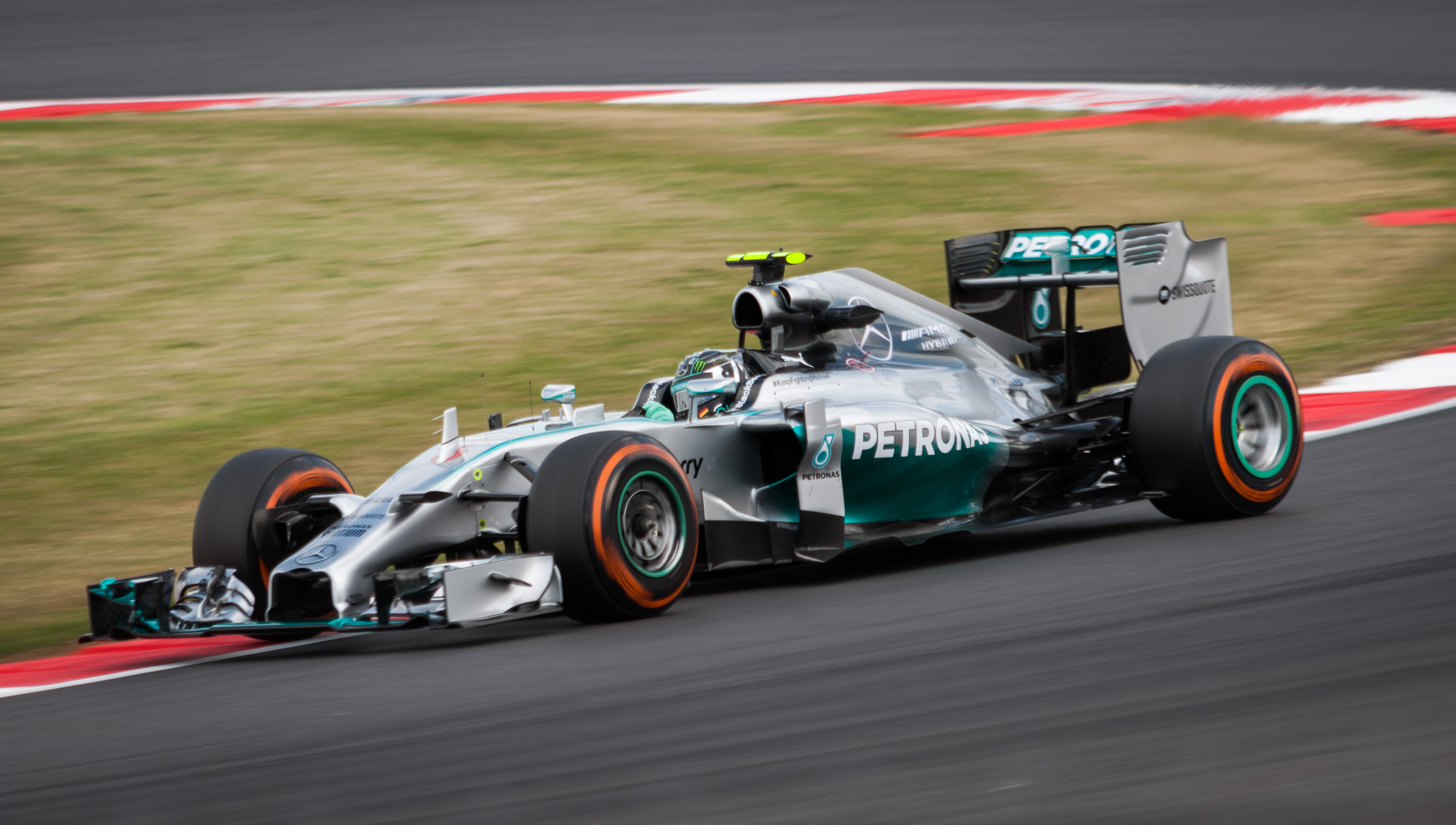
Rosberg practising for the 2014 British Grand Prix

Throughout his career, Rosberg had a strong work ethic, talking to engineers and mechanics, and approached each circuit with the care of a cartographer. Formula One pundits regarded Rosberg as "among the most promising emergent stars of what some already call 'the Lewis generation'." The media and fans compared him initially to the 1982 world champion, his father Keke. That comparison lessened as his career progressed; he refused to discuss the comparison with the press and the difficulty in attempting to achieve as much success as his father was rarely mentioned. When Rosberg was Michael Schumacher's teammate at Mercedes, he was highly cautious about what he said to the off-track press, fearing that they could misinterpret his words.

Rosberg had a scientific and technical driving style; he sought to fine-tune his car in specific detail and adapted his driving ability around the changes, especially over a single lap. He shared his father's preference of oversteer over understeer and lacked a flamboyant driving technique. Rosberg's qualifying preparations would be compromised in the event that he leaned towards a race setup; he analysed the situation and attempted to optimise his driving style to win races. He occasionally used more of the circuit, using his car's ride over a bumpy track to ask the car to take as much as possible. Rosberg was sometimes unable to cope with the stress of extra complications, causing him to overdrive in the process, but was adept at managing technical issues on his car. Will Buxton, a motorsport commentator and pundit, described him as "quick from the outset" and a driver who "was so impressive; seemingly effortlessly rapid and blessed with a precision that was metronomic."

=== Helmet design and car number ===
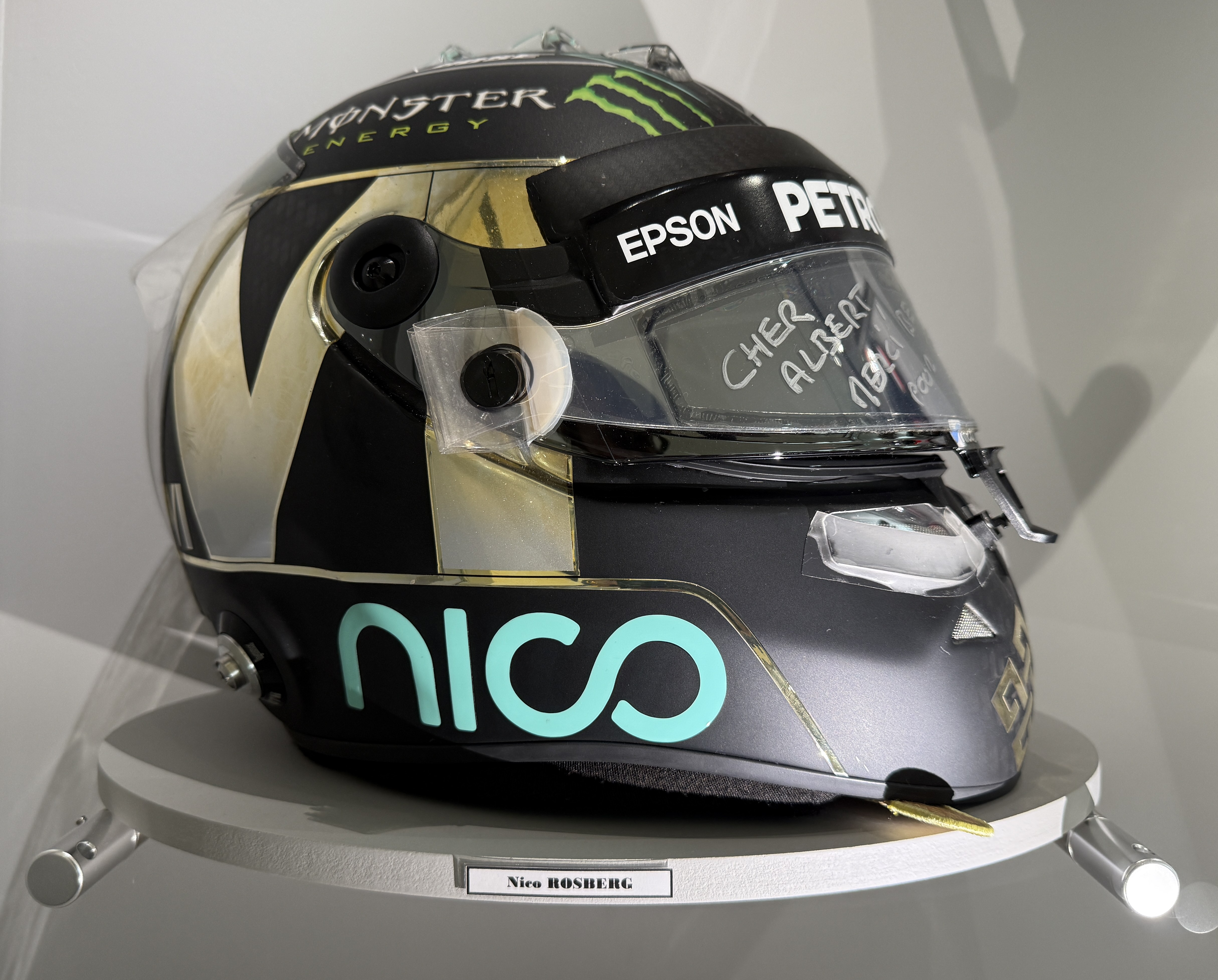
Rosberg's 2016 helmet, a gift to Albert II, Prince of Monaco

For the 2014 season, the FIA created a new sporting regulation to allow a driver to select a unique car number for use throughout their Formula One career. Rosberg selected number six because it was his wife and father's lucky number. He also changed the colour of his helmet after eight years from yellow to dark grey. The overall design included chrome, some Buddhist influence, clean lines, and personal symbols; it was designed by Jens Munser. (Note: Association football's world governing body FIFA asked Rosberg's manager Georg Nolte to ask his client to change the design of his helmet to celebrate Germany winning the 2014 FIFA World Cup due to a copyright violation.)

== Endorsements and philanthropy ==
Creative Artists Agency (CAA), through its sports division CAA Sports, represents Rosberg's commercial ventures. From 2010 to 2015, he was associated with the jewellery and watch brand Thomas Sabo, and the luxury travel accessory maker Tumi. Rosberg signed numerous endorsement contracts; some of the companies with which he has done business are the watchmakers Rolex, International Watch Company and Oris, the tyre maker Continental Tire, the luxury fashion house Hugo Boss, the toy car company Hot Wheels, the railway company Deutsche Bahn, the media broadcasters Sky Sports and RTL, energy company EnBW and logistics provider Jungheinrich. As a result of Rosberg's endorsement money and Mercedes salary, he was listed as one of the world's highest-paid athletes by Forbes in 2016.

Rosberg is an ambassador for Mercedes-Benz, Laureus, the investment bank UBS, the Tribute to Bambi Foundation, and the electric car manufacturer Schaeffler Group. He is part of the alcohol brewing company Heineken's anti-drink-drive campaign, including appearing with his father in an advertisement for zero-alcohol beer in 2020. Rosberg accumulated €160,900 for the Laureus Sport for Good Foundation as part of a campaign called #DriveForGood in which €100 was donated for every kilometre he led in a Formula One race from the 2015 Chinese Grand Prix to the season-ending 2015 Abu Dhabi Grand Prix.

In 2012, Rosberg teamed with the children's aid organisation Ein Herz für Kinder (German: A Heart for Children) and has raised capital for the charity through various events. Rosberg has worked for the Viva con Agua de Sankt Pauli charity, which supplies water and basic sanitation to individuals in developing countries. In response to the murder of George Floyd, in June 2020, Rosberg donated €10,000 to the NAACP Legal Defense and Educational Fund to aid its efforts in educating the public on racism and ending segregation. He invested money into projects involving reforestation in Germany and the promotion of South American sustainable agro-forestry.

== Achievements and recognition ==
On 5 June 2011, Rosberg received the Lorenzo Bandini Trophy, which honours a recipient "for their dedication to motor racing, spirit of competition and achievements". At the 2014 Brazilian Grand Prix, he won the inaugural FIA Pole Trophy for winning more pole positions than any other driver during the 2014 season with 11. Rosberg won the DHL Fastest Lap Award because he recorded seven fastest laps, more than any other driver during the 2016 season.

Rosberg won the Bambi Best Sportsman Award in 2014, the Sport Bild Special Award 2014, the 2016 BRDC Johnny Wakefield Trophy for "setting the fastest race lap of the season on the Silverstone Grand Prix Circuit", the Autosport International Racing Driver Award in the same year, the 2016 ADAC Motorsportsman of the Year Award, the 2017 Laureus World Sports Award for Breakthrough of the Year, the DMSB Cup from the German Motor Sport Federation (German: Deutscher Motor Sport Bund; DMSB) that same year, and the 2018 Special Prize Entrepreneur of the Year at the GreenTec Awards. Rosberg was inducted into the FIA Hall of Fame in December 2017.

== Karting record ==
=== Karting career summary ===
Season	Series	Team	Position
1997	Trophee Jérôme Bernard – Minimes		1st
1997	Trophee de France – Minimes		1st
1998	Torneo Industrie – 100 Junior		5th
1998	CIK-FIA Green Helmet Trophy – Cadet		
1998	Andrea Margutti Trophy – 100 Junior	CRG	7th
1999	Andrea Margutti Trophy – 100 Junior	CRG	13th
1999	European Championship – ICA Junior		4th
2000	Andrea Margutti Trophy – Formula A		18th
2000	European Championship – Formula A	MBM.com	2nd
2000	World Championship – Formula A	MBM.com	22nd
2001	South Garda Winter Cup – Formula Super A	10th	18th
2001	Italian Open Masters – Formula A		5th
2001	World Championship – Formula Super A		16th

== Racing record ==
=== Career summary ===
Season	Series	Team	Races	Wins	Poles	F/Laps	Podiums	Points	Position
2001	Formula BMW Junior Cup Iberia		3	0	0	0	0	38	18th
2002	Formula BMW ADAC	VIVA Racing	20	9	5	1	13	264	**1st**
2003	Formula 3 Euro Series	Team Rosberg	20	1	1	2	5	45	8th
2003	Masters of Formula 3	Team Rosberg	1	0	0	0	0	—N/a	NC
2003	Macau Grand Prix	Carlin Motorsport	1	0	0	0	0	—N/a	NC
2003	Korea Super Prix	Carlin Motorsport	1	0	0	0	0	—N/a	11th
2004	Formula 3 Euro Series	Team Rosberg	19	3	2	2	5	70	4th
2004	Macau Grand Prix	Team Rosberg	1	0	0	0	0	—N/a	NC
2004	Masters of Formula 3	Team Rosberg	1	0	0	0	0	—N/a	6th
2004	Bahrain Superprix	Team Rosberg	1	0	0	0	1	—N/a	**2nd**
2005	GP2 Series	ART Grand Prix	23	5	4	5	12	120	**1st**
2005	Formula One	BMW Williams F1 Team	Test driver						
2006	Formula One	Williams F1 Team	18	0	0	1	0	4	17th
2007	Formula One	AT&T Williams	17	0	0	0	0	20	9th
2008	Formula One	AT&T Williams	18	0	0	0	2	17	13th
2009	Formula One	AT&T Williams	17	0	0	1	0	34.5	7th
2010	Formula One	Mercedes GP Petronas F1 Team	19	0	0	0	3	142	7th
2011	Formula One	Mercedes GP Petronas F1 Team	19	0	0	0	0	89	7th
2012	Formula One	Mercedes AMG Petronas F1 Team	20	1	1	2	2	93	9th
2013	Formula One	Mercedes AMG Petronas F1 Team	19	2	3	0	4	171	6th
2014	Formula One	Mercedes AMG Petronas F1 Team	19	5	11	5	15	317	**2nd**
2015	Formula One	Mercedes AMG Petronas F1 Team	19	6	7	5	15	322	**2nd**
2016	Formula One	Mercedes AMG Petronas F1 Team	21	9	8	6	16	385	**1st**

=== Complete Formula BMW ADAC results ===
(key) (Races in bold indicate pole position; races in italics indicate fastest lap; small number denotes the finishing position)

Year	Entrant	1	2	3	4	5	6	7	8	9	10	11	12	13	14	15	16	17	18	19	20	DC	Points
2002	VIVA Racing	**HOC1**; **1**; 1	**HOC1**; **2**; 1	ZOL; 1; 2	ZOL; 2; 1	SAC; 1; 11	SAC; 2; 11	NÜR1; 1; 3	NÜR1; 2; 1	NOR; 1; 4	NOR; 2; 2	LAU; 1; 7	LAU; 2; 5	NÜR2; 1; 3	NÜR2; 2; 1	A1R; 1; 5	A1R; 2; 17	ZAN; 1; 1	**ZAN**; **2**; 1	**HOC2**; **1**; 1	**HOC2**; **2**; 1	1st	264

=== Complete Formula 3 Euro Series results ===
(key) (Races in bold indicate pole position; races in italics indicate fastest lap; small number denotes the finishing position)

Year	Entrant	Chassis	Engine	1	2	3	4	5	6	7	8	9	10	11	12	13	14	15	16	17	18	19	20	DC	Points
2003	Team Rosberg	Dallara F303/005	Spiess-Opel	HOC; 1 Ret	HOC; 2; 3	ADR; 1 Ret	**ADR**; **2**; 2	PAU; 1; 15	PAU; 2; 17	NOR; 1; 8	NOR; 2 Ret	LMS; 1; 1	LMS; 2; 11	NÜR; 1 Ret	NÜR; 2; 3	A1R; 1; 8	A1R; 2; 3	ZAN; 1; 18	ZAN; 2; 8	HOC; 1; 7	HOC; 2; 14	MAG; 1; 6	MAG; 2 Ret	8th	45
2004	Team Rosberg	Dallara F303/006	Spiess-Opel	HOC; 1; 1	HOC; 2; 1	EST; 1 Ret	EST; 2; 4	ADR; 1; 5	ADR; 1 Ret	PAU; 1 Ret	PAU; 2 Ret	NOR; 1; 4	NOR; 1; 17	MAG; 1; 6	**MAG**; **2**; 2	NÜR; 1; 1	**NÜR**; **2**; 3	ZAN; 1 Ret	ZAN; 2 DNS	BRN; 1; 4	BRN; 2; 11	HOC; 1; 8	HOC; 2; 8	4th	70

=== Complete GP2 Series results ===
(key) (Races in bold indicate pole position; races in italics indicate fastest lap; small number denotes the finishing position)

Year	Entrant	1	2	3	4	5	6	7	8	9	10	11	12	13	14	15	16	17	18	19	20	21	22	23	DC	Points
2005	ART Grand Prix	IMO; FEA; 8	IMO; SPR; Ret	CAT; FEA; 9	CAT; SPR; 4	MON; FEA; 3	NÜR; FEA; 3	NÜR; SPR; 4	MAG; FEA; 7	MAG; SPR; 1	**SIL**; **FEA**; 1	SIL; SPR; 4	**HOC**; **FEA**; 1	HOC; SPR; 4	HUN; FEA; 5	HUN; SPR; 2	**IST**; **FEA**; 17	IST; SPR; 3	MNZ; FEA; 2	MNZ; SPR; 2	SPA; FEA; 3	SPA; SPR; 5	**BHR**; **FEA**; 1	BHR; SPR; 1	**1st**	**120**

=== Complete Formula One results ===
(key) (Races in bold indicate pole position; races in italics indicate fastest lap; small number denotes the finishing position)

Year	Entrant	Chassis	Engine	1	2	3	4	5	6	7	8	9	10	11	12	13	14	15	16	17	18	19	20	21	WDC	Points
2006	Williams F1 Team	Williams FW28	Cosworth CA2006 2.4 V8	BHR; 7	MAL; Ret	AUS; Ret	SMR; 11	EUR; 7	ESP; 11	MON; Ret	GBR; 9	CAN; Ret	USA; 9	FRA; 14	GER; Ret	HUN; Ret	TUR; Ret	ITA; Ret	CHN; 11	JPN; 10	BRA; Ret				17th	4
2007	AT&T Williams	Williams FW29	Toyota RVX-07 2.4 V8	AUS; 7	MAL; Ret	BHR; 10	ESP; 6	MON; 12	CAN; 10	USA; 16^{†}	FRA; 9	GBR; 12	EUR; Ret	HUN; 7	TUR; 7	ITA; 6	BEL; 6	JPN; Ret	CHN; 16	BRA; 4					9th	20
2008	AT&T Williams	Williams FW30	Toyota RVX-08 2.4 V8	AUS; 3	MAL; 14	BHR; 8	ESP; Ret	TUR; 8	MON; Ret	CAN; 10	FRA; 16	GBR; 9	GER; 10	HUN; 14	EUR; 8	BEL; 12	ITA; 14	SIN; 2	JPN; 11	CHN; 15	BRA; 12				13th	17
2009	AT&T Williams	Williams FW31	Toyota RVX-09 2.4 V8	AUS; 6	MAL; 8^{‡}	CHN; 15	BHR; 9	ESP; 8	MON; 6	TUR; 5	GBR; 5	GER; 4	HUN; 4	EUR; 5	BEL; 8	ITA; 16	SIN; 11	JPN; 5	BRA; Ret	ABU; 9					7th	34.5
2010	Mercedes GP Petronas F1 Team	Mercedes MGP W01	Mercedes FO 108X 2.4 V8	BHR; 5	AUS; 5	MAL; 3	CHN; 3	ESP; 13	MON; 7	TUR; 5	CAN; 6	EUR; 10	GBR; 3	GER; 8	HUN; Ret	BEL; 6	ITA; 5	SIN; 5	JPN; 17^{†}	KOR; Ret	BRA; 6	ABU; 4			7th	142
2011	Mercedes GP Petronas F1 Team	Mercedes MGP W02	Mercedes FO 108Y 2.4 V8	AUS; Ret	MAL; 12	CHN; 5	TUR; 5	ESP; 7	MON; 11	CAN; 11	EUR; 7	GBR; 6	GER; 7	HUN; 9	BEL; 6	ITA; Ret	SIN; 7	JPN; 10	KOR; 8	IND; 6	ABU; 6	BRA; 7			7th	89
2012	Mercedes AMG Petronas F1 Team	Mercedes F1 W03	Mercedes FO 108Z 2.4 V8	AUS; 12	MAL; 13	**CHN**; 1	BHR; 5	ESP; 7	MON; 2	CAN; 6	EUR; 6	GBR; 15	GER; 10	HUN; 10	BEL; 11	ITA; 7	SIN; 5	JPN; Ret	KOR; Ret	IND; 11	ABU; Ret	USA; 13	BRA; 15		9th	93
2013	Mercedes AMG Petronas F1 Team	Mercedes F1 W04	Mercedes FO 108F 2.4 V8	AUS; Ret	MAL; 4	CHN; Ret	**BHR**; 9	**ESP**; 6	**MON**; 1	CAN; 5	GBR; 1	GER; 9	HUN; 19^{†}	BEL; 4	ITA; 6	SIN; 4	KOR; 7	JPN; 8	IND; 2	ABU; 3	USA; 9	BRA; 5			6th	171
2014	Mercedes AMG Petronas F1 Team	Mercedes F1 W05 Hybrid	Mercedes PU106A Hybrid 1.6 V6 t	AUS; 1	MAL; 2	**BHR**; 2	CHN; 2	ESP; 2	**MON**; 1	**CAN**; 2	AUT; 1	**GBR**; Ret	**GER**; 1	**HUN**; 4	**BEL**; 2	ITA; 2	SIN; Ret	**JPN**; 2	RUS; 2	**USA**; 2	**BRA**; 1	**ABU**; 14			2nd	317
2015	Mercedes AMG Petronas F1 Team	Mercedes F1 W06 Hybrid	Mercedes PU106B Hybrid 1.6 V6 t	AUS; 2	MAL; 3	CHN; 2	BHR; 3	**ESP**; 1	MON; 1	CAN; 2	AUT; 1	GBR; 2	HUN; 8	BEL; 2	ITA; 17^{†}	SIN; 4	**JPN**; 2	**RUS**; Ret	**USA**; 2	**MEX**; 1	**BRA**; 1	**ABU**; 1			2nd	322
2016	Mercedes AMG Petronas F1 Team	Mercedes F1 W07 Hybrid	Mercedes PU106C Hybrid 1.6 V6 t	AUS; 1	BHR; 1	**CHN**; 1	**RUS**; 1	ESP; Ret	MON; 7	CAN; 5	**EUR**; 1	AUT; 4	GBR; 3	**HUN**; 2	**GER**; 4	**BEL**; 1	ITA; 1	**SIN**; 1	MAL; 3	**JPN**; 1	USA; 2	MEX; 2	BRA; 2	ABU; 2	1st	385

^{†} Driver failed to finish the race but was classified since he had completed more than 90% of the race distance.
^{‡} Half points awarded because less than 75% of race distance was completed.

== Notes and references ==
=== References ===
Sporting positions
Preceded by Timo Glock	Formula BMW ADAC; Champion; 2002	Succeeded by Maximilian Götz
Preceded by Vitantonio Liuzzi (F3000)	GP2 Series; Drivers' Champion; 2005	Succeeded by Lewis Hamilton
Preceded by Lewis Hamilton	Formula One World Champion; 2016	Succeeded by Lewis Hamilton
Awards and achievements
Preceded by Lewis Hamilton	Lorenzo Bandini Trophy; 2011	Succeeded by Bruno Senna
Preceded by Inaugural	FIA Pole Trophy; 2014	Succeeded by Lewis Hamilton
Preceded by Lewis Hamilton	DHL Fastest Lap Award; 2016	Succeeded by Lewis Hamilton
Preceded by Lewis Hamilton	Autosport; International Racing Driver Award; 2016	Succeeded by Lewis Hamilton
Preceded by Jordan Spieth	Laureus World Breakthrough of the Year; 2017	Succeeded by Sergio García
Records
Preceded by Fernando Alonso; 21 years, 321 days (2003 Canadian GP)	Youngest driver to set fastest lap in Formula One; 20 years, 258 days (2006 Bahrain Grand Prix)	Succeeded by Max Verstappen; 19 years, 44 days (2016 Brazilian GP)
