= Ecopreneurship =

Ecopreneurship, sometimes called environmental entrepreneurship, is entrepreneurship applied to create businesses that solve environmental problems or operate sustainably. The term began to be widely used in the 1990s, and it is otherwise referred to as "environmental entrepreneurship." In the book Merging Economic and Environmental Concerns Through Ecopreneurship, written by Gwyn Schuyler in 1998, ecopreneurs are defined as follows:

"Ecopreneurs are entrepreneurs whose business efforts are not only driven by profit, but also by a concern for the environment. Ecopreneurship, also known as environmental entrepreneurship and eco-capitalism, is becoming more widespread as a new market-based approach to identifying opportunities for improving environmental quality and capitalizing upon them in the private sector for profit. "

Although ecopreneurship initiatives can span a wide range of issues from ocean pollution to recycling to food waste, they tend to follow reoccurring environmental principles such as systems thinking, cradle to cradle product design, triple bottom line accounting, etc.

== Systems thinking ==
Systems Thinking is a core principle to any business concerned with sustainability and the environment. It is an approach to problem solving that studies how something interacts with its environment as a whole, whether that be social, economic or natural. This is in contrast to a linear thinking model, which would isolate a problem and study only its directly related processes to find solutions. It consists of the notion that in order to understand vertical problems (looking deeply at one particular issue), you must understand and evaluate the horizontal environment as a whole (the entire system and its interrelated functions). As it pertains to business is best illustrated in the book Entrepreneurship and Sustainability by Andrea Larsen,

"Systems thinking applied to new ventures reminds us that companies operate in complex sets of interlocking living and non-living, including markets and supply chains as well as non-living systems.... Taking a systems perspective reminds us that we are accustomed to thinking of business in terms of discrete units with clear boundaries between them. We forget that these boundaries exist primarily in our minds or as legal constructs."

== Product design ==
A lot of companies using ecopreneurship principles incorporate sustainable product design. Product design incorporating sustainability can happen at any stage of the business, including material extraction, logistics, the manufacturing process, disposal, etc. Sustainable product design can be achieved using innovative technology (or Eco-innovation), cradle to cradle design, bio-mimicry, etc. In a description by the government of Canada's department on Innovation, Science and Economic Development, sustainable product design is further explained:

"Product design offers the opportunity to incorporate green and socially responsible attributes into a product. Referred to as Design for Sustainability (D4S), it is a process that addresses environmental and social considerations in the earliest stages of the product development process to minimize negative environmental and social impacts throughout the product's life cycle and to comply with the principles of economic, social and ecological sustainability.

Sustainable product design can encompass the selection of materials, use of resources, production requirements and planning for the final disposition (recycling, reuse, remanufacturing, or disposal) of a product. It takes into account the socio-economic circumstances of the company and the opportunity for the firm to address social problems associated with poverty, safety, inequity, health and the working environment. It is not a stand-alone methodology but one that must be integrated with a company's existing product design so that environmental and social parameters can be integrated with traditional product attributes such as quality, cost, and functionality."

Some examples of ways to implement sustainable product design include:

- streamline design - use fewer materials, find sustainable material substitutes
- procure materials sustainability - choose resources whose extraction is not harmful to the surrounding environment and use the most Eco-friendly extraction methods
- reduce materials - reducing material weight or transportation volume
- optimize production - use production techniques with as little as possible harmful environmental side effects like toxic chemical release, reduce waste and emissions
- improve distribution - use less or reusable packaging, transport and distribute products more efficiently
- cut impact - reduce energy consumption, use cleaner energy sources like solar panels or wind power.
- prolong life - improve durability and reliability of product, offer repair services, re-purpose broken or unused products
- manage waste - implement recycling or reuse programs, up-cycle product, dispose of safely

=== Innovative Technology ===
Many companies practicing ecopreneurship attempt to solve environmental issues either by developing new technology or innovating already existing technologies. The most widespread examples of this are the creation of solar panels and hybrid cars in order to decrease dependency on fossil fuels. Countless other examples from anaerobic digestion food waste systems to portable air purifiers exist. The competitive advantage or core competency for ecopreneurship companies is oftentimes related to a technology they have developed. More examples of companies using innovative technology are below in Business Examples.

=== Cradle to Cradle Design ===
Cradle-to-cradle design is popular environmental approach to product design that seeks to eliminate waste by designing products that can be continuously recirculated through our economy. This is contrasted against a "cradle to grave" design which typically includes single use products or products made of multiple different materials that cannot be separated in order to be recycled properly. Cradle to Cradle design is mimicked after processes in the natural environment which do not create waste but instead every output is an input for another organism. Cradle to Cradle design is often achieved through using environmentally friendly resources (non-toxic) that can either be recycled into other products or composted. Another important component of cradle to cradle design is the ability to easily take products apart for better reuse as well as designing with durability in mind. This idea was popularized by the 2002 book Cradle to Cradle: Remaking the Way We Make Things written by William McDonough and Michael Braungart.

==== Bio-mimicry ====
Bio-mimicry (or Biomimetics) is a term created by American biophysicist Otto Schmitt that refers to recreating the solutions for problems found in nature. A definition provided by the Institute for Biomimicry (a non-profit organization) is as follows:

"Biomimicry is an approach to innovation that seeks sustainable solutions to human challenges by emulating nature's time tested patterns and strategies."

Some examples include studying the building of sand mounds by ants in order to create lower cost air circulation for buildings and trains with curved fronts mimicking the beaks of birds to increase speed. Other examples can be found in Janine Benyus' Ted Talk on biomimicry.

== Triple bottom line accounting ==
Triple bottom line accounting is an accounting method that combines traditional accounting methods of measuring profit with those that measure social and environmental benefits as well. The phrase was created by John Elkington in 1994 at his company SustainAbility. Some criticisms have sprung up over what methods are to be used to measure environmental and social impacts.

== Legal forms ==
Ecopreneurs may decide to develop their company under traditional business legal forms like a sole proprietorship or an LLC or they might choose some newer forms discussed below. These business forms are popular among the environmentally conscious community for their emphasis on social benefit.

- Low-profit limited liability company or (L3C) is a company that follows the same legal and tax codes as a traditional LLC but has a main goal of increasing social welfare like that of a non-profit organization. This form of business is not available in every state of the US as of 2013.
- Benefit corporation is for-profit legal entity that differs in its purpose and accountability from that of a regular corporation. Its emphasis on mission-driven purpose allows it a different accountability to stakeholders. This form of business is not available in every state of the US as of 2013.

== Business examples ==
- Patagonia
- Clif Bars
- Tesla
- TerraCycle
- Seventh Generation

== See also ==
- Entrepreneurship
- Social entrepreneurship
- Sustainopreneurship
