= Sustainopreneurship =

Business with a Cause - Innovate, Create and Organize for Sustainability

Sustainopreneurship describes the creation or running of a business to address environmental or social sustainability challenges. The concept stems from Social Entrepreneurship and Ecopreneurship.

The term is commonly used to denote a market-based approach to sustainability in which organizations operate within conventional economic systems while aiming to reduce environmental impacts or address social issues. In this usage, sustainability objectives are incorporated into business strategy or operation, rather than treated as peripheral or philanthropic activities.

== Definition ==
The term Sustainopreneurship was first formally defined in 2006 by Anders Abrahamsson. It refers to the deployment of sustainability-oriented innovations through entrepreneurial activity. The concept involves identifying one or more sustainability-related social, environmental, or global problems and developing solutions that are brought to the market through the creation of efficient organizations.

Sustainopreneurial organizations are mission-driven and aim to generate ecological, economic, or social value. These activities seek to preserve, restore, or enhance the underlying natural, social, or economic capital, thereby supporting the long-term ability to meet the needs of present and future stakeholders.

== Conceptual development ==
Academic literature has discussed businesses as important contributors to sustainable development, particularly due to their role in innovation and economic activity. Scholars have argued that sustainability challenges require engagement beyond government action and involve participation from multiple sectors, including the private sector.

The term sustainopreneurship was first introduced in 2000. It was further developed through academic publications beginning in 2003, and a tentative definition was proposed in 2006 by Abrahamsson. Subsequent studies addressed future research challenges and contributed to the conceptual development of the field through conference papers and book chapters.

Entrepreneurship research has increasingly expanded beyond a purely economic perspective and has been examined as a broader social process. Prior to the development of sustainopreneurship, two related approaches—social entrepreneurship and ecopreneurship—that addressed specific dimensions of sustainability. Social entrepreneurship has primarily focused on addressing social challenges, often through nonprofit or hybrid organizational forms, while ecopreneurship has emphasized environmental problem-solving through business activity.

Sustainopreneurship is distinct from sustainable entrepreneurship in its primary objective. Sustainable entrepreneurship generally incorporates sustainability considerations into entrepreneurial processes, whereas sustainopreneurship is explicitly oriented toward solving sustainability-related problems through business organization and innovation. In this context, sustainability is not an auxiliary consideration but a central strategic aim.

Before being formalized into business entities, sustainopreneurial initiatives typically involve identifying practical sustainability challenges. These challenges are often derived from international sustainable development frameworks such as Agenda 21, the Millennium Declaration, and the World Summit on Sustainable Development Plan of Implementation. These frameworks outline key areas where sustainability-related problems, goals, and value creation are interconnected.

Commonly referenced areas include:

- Poverty
- Water and sanitation
- Health
- Education and literacy
- Sustainable production and consumption
- Climate change and energy systems
- Chemical management
- Urbanization
- Ecosystems, biodiversity, and land use
- Marine resource utilization
- Food and agriculture
- Trade justice
- Social stability, democracy, and governance
- Peace and security

== Future development ==
As a relatively recent area of study, sustainopreneurship has been identified in academic literature as requiring further research. Scholars have suggested the need for more detailed conceptual frameworks and taxonomies of sustainability-oriented innovations, which are considered central to the field. Such frameworks are commonly proposed to be developed through the systematic documentation and analysis of empirical case studies.

Research has also emphasized the importance of applied approaches to examine the institutional barriers, enabling conditions, and mechanisms that influence sustainopreneurial activities. Areas of interest include identifying facilitating factors, tools, and organizational approaches that support the development and implementation of sustainability-driven ventures. Methodologies such as Enactive Research and Open Space Technology have been discussed in the literature as participatory approaches that may support stakeholder engagement and collaborative problem-solving in sustainopreneurial contexts.

== See also ==
- Eco-innovation
- Environmental technology
- Impact investing
- Social business
- Social enterprise
- Social innovation
