= Eco-innovation =

Development of products and processes that contribute to sustainable development

Eco-innovation is the development of products and processes that contribute to sustainable development, applying the commercial application of knowledge to elicit direct or indirect ecological improvements. This includes a range of related ideas, from environmentally friendly technological advances to socially acceptable innovative paths towards sustainability. The field of research that seeks to explain how, why, and at what rate new "ecological" ideas and technology spread is called eco-innovation diffusion.

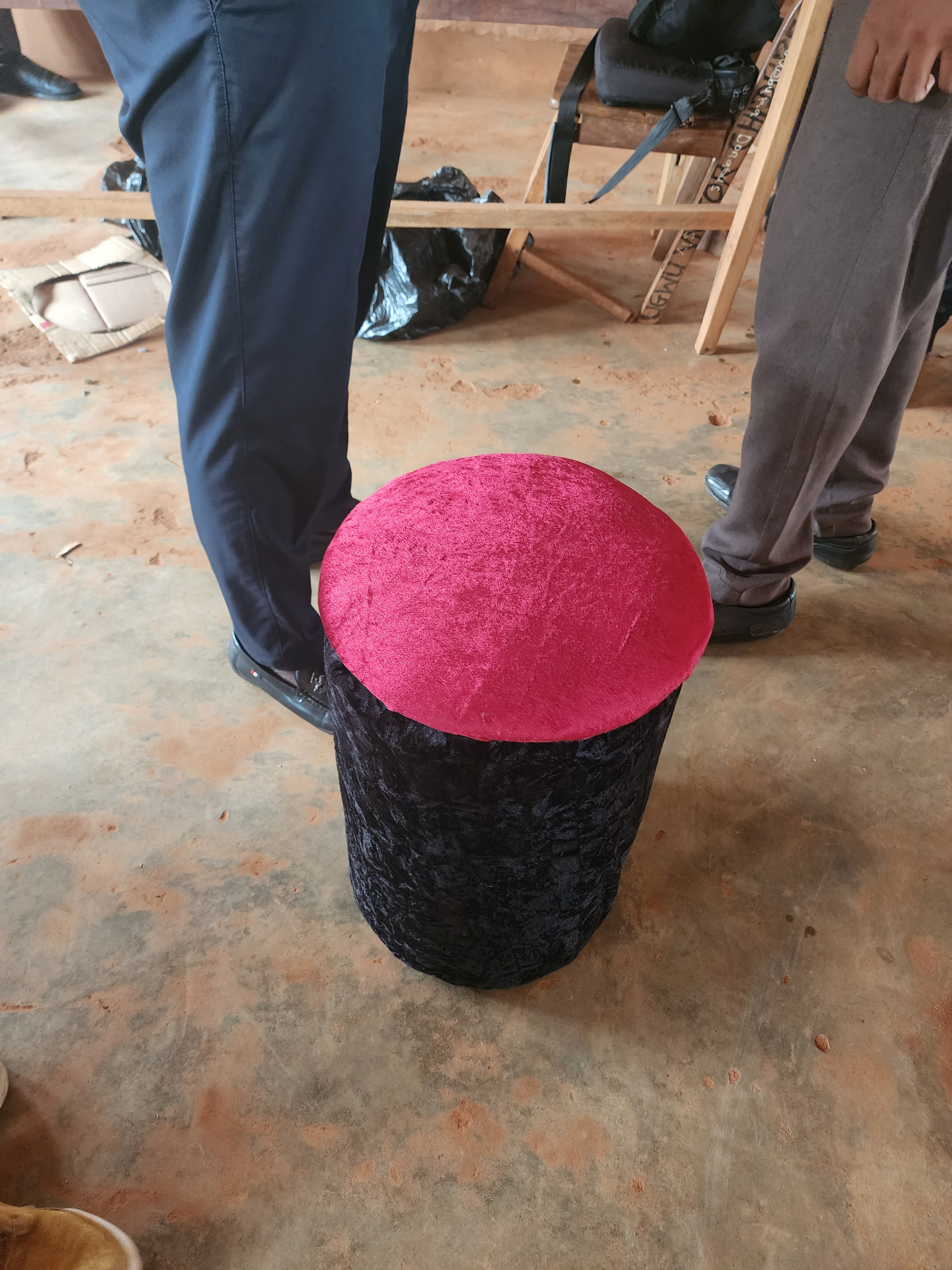
A seat made from waste containing cartons, foams, and PET bottles.

== Concept ==
The idea of eco-innovation is fairly recent. One of the first appearances in the literature was in a 1996 book by Claude Fussler and Peter James. In a subsequent article in 1997, Peter James defined eco-innovation as "new products and processes which provide customer and business value but significantly decrease environmental impacts". Klaus Rennings employs the term eco-innovation to describe three kinds of changes related to sustainable development: technological, social and institutional innovation.

Eco-innovation is sometimes called "environmental innovation", and is often linked with environmental technology, eco-efficiency, eco-design, environmental design, sustainable design, or environmental sustainable innovation. While the term "environmental innovation" is used in similar contexts to "eco-innovation", the other terms are mostly used when referring to product or process design, and when the focus is more on the technological aspects of eco-innovation rather than the societal and political aspects. Ecovation is the process by which business adopts ecological innovation to create products which have a generative nature and are recyclable.

=== As a technological term ===
The most common usage of the term "eco-innovation" is to refer to innovative products and processes that reduce environmental impacts, whether the main motivation for their development or deployment is environmental or not. This is often used in conjunction with eco-efficiency and eco-design. Leaders in many industries have been developing innovative technologies in order to work towards sustainability. However, these are not always practical, or enforced by policy and legislation.

=== As a social process ===
Another position held (for example, by the organisation Eco Innovation) is that this definition should be complemented: eco-innovations should also bring greater social and cultural acceptance. In this view, this "social pillar" added to James's definition is necessary because it determines learning and the effectiveness of eco-innovations. This approach gives eco-innovations a social component, a status that is more than a new type of commodity, or a new sector, even though environmental technology and eco-innovation are associated with the emergence of new economic activities or even branches (e.g., waste treatment, recycling, etc.). This approach considers eco-innovation in terms of usage rather than merely in terms of product. The social pillar associated with eco-innovation introduces a governance component that makes eco-innovation a more integrated tool for sustainable development.

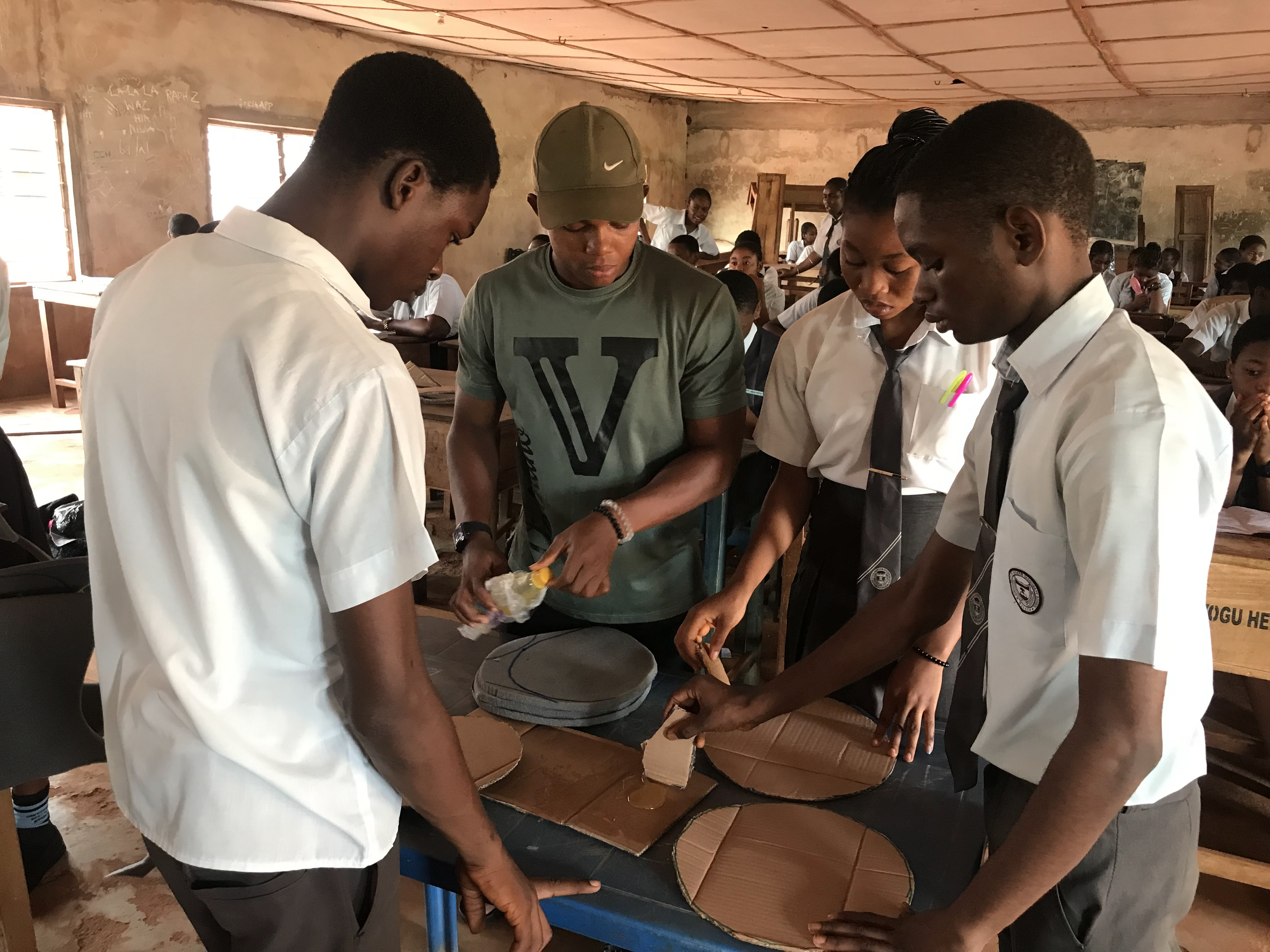
Environmental activist teaching students on how to use waste to create a seat.

=== Examples ===
- Geothermal power – utilized through technology such as dry steam power stations, flash steam power stations and binary cycle power stations.
- Hydropower – utilized through technology such as hydroelectric dams.
- Solar power – utilized through technology such as solar panels.
- Tidal power – utilized through technology such as tidal barrages and tidal stream generators.
- Wind power – utilized through technology such as wind turbines.

== Diffusion ==
Literature in the field of eco-innovations often focuses on policy, regulations, technology, market and firm specific factors rather than diffusion. However, understanding of diffusion of eco-innovations recently has gained more importance given the fact that some eco-innovations are already at a mature stage. Survey research shows that most customers hold positive attitudes towards various types of eco-innovations. At the same time, adoption rates of solutions such as dynamic electricity tariffs remain unsatisfactorily low. The "Not In My Back Yard" (NIMBY) concept is often used to describe what at first seems to be a confusing intention-behavior gap between high levels of public support for eco-innovations and frequent non-engagement or even local hostility towards specific project proposals. Social psychology and economic behavior models could and should be used to overcome these challenges.

According to theory on the diffusion of innovation different adopters of innovation can be in different stages of acceptance. Research on eco-innovations in the construction sector reveals that for eco-innovations to gain acceptance among B2B actors, in addition to having a reduced environmental footprint, they need to demonstrate improved efficiency, create new market opportunities, and help to change the mindset from the traditional mass production to that of creating value. Hence, for such innovations to diffuse in a larger market they need to address industry-specific problems, and not simply act as a substitute for an existing technology.

== See also ==
- Eco-development – Measure of increase in market value of goods
- Ecological design – Design approach sensitive to environmental impacts
- Ecological restoration – Scientific study of renewing and restoring ecosystems
- Ecomodernism – Environmental movement emphasizing technological innovation for sustainability
- Environmental technology – Technical and technological processes for protection of the environment
- Frugal innovation – Process of reducing the complexity and cost of a good and its production
- International Innovation Index – Global index measuring the level of innovation of a country
- Sustainable agriculture – Farming approach
- Sustainopreneurship – Business with a Cause - Innovate, Create and Organize for Sustainability
