= Sustainable innovation =

Business development concept

Environmental innovation, eco-innovation or sustainable innovation refers to innovation focused on the systematic development of new products, services, processes, or business models that significantly reduce environmental harm while creating economic and social value. It plays a crucial role in addressing climate change, biodiversity loss, and resource depletion while aligning economic growth with environmental protection and social well-being. Environmental sustainable innovation integrates environmental considerations into all stages of innovation, aligning with circular economy principles, green technologies, and clean production practices. It encourages organisations to transition from linear production models to restorative and regenerative systems.

== Key characteristics ==
These innovation encompasses a broad range of technological and non-technological characteristics. These characteristics highlight how businesses, industries, and institutions adopt different mechanisms, ranging from incremental improvements to systemic transformations, to advance sustainability objectives.

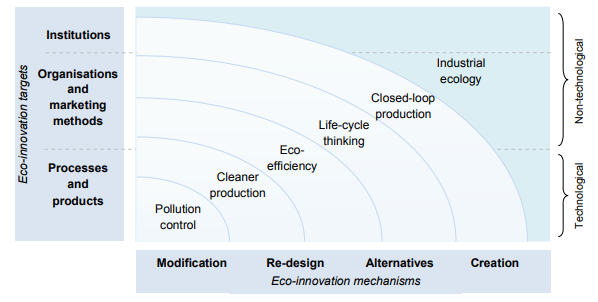
Key Characteristics

=== Technological ===
Technological eco-innovations focus on modifying, redesigning, and creating processes and products to reduce environmental impacts while maintaining or improving economic performance. They typically involve cleaner production methods, resource efficiency measures, life-cycle thinking, and the development of closed-loop manufacturing systems.

- Resource Efficiency (Eco-efficiency, Cleaner Production): Reducing the use of finite resources and energy throughout production and consumption processes while integrating renewable energy where possible. This aligns with eco-efficiency and cleaner production mechanisms, focusing on modification and redesign of existing processes to reduce input needs.
- Pollution and Waste Reduction (Pollution Control): Minimizing emissions, pollutants, and waste generation across the product life cycle aligns with pollution control and cleaner production, focusing on modification of existing production systems for lower environmental impact.
- Circular Economy (Closed-loop Production, Life-cycle Thinking): Designing products and processes for repairability, reusability, and recycling to extend product lifespans aligns with closed-loop production and life-cycle thinking, emphasizing alternatives and creation within technological eco-innovation mechanisms.

=== Non-Technological ===
Non-technological eco-innovations address system-level and organizational changes required for sustainability transitions. They involve rethinking institutions, business models, marketing methods, and value chains to embed sustainability principles across all stages, from design and production to consumption and disposal.

- Systemic Approach (Industrial Ecology) Restructuring value chains, business models, and industrial systems to embed sustainability principles at every stage, from design to disposal. This aligns with industrial ecology, focusing on system-level creation and alternatives for eco-innovation that go beyond technological changes, addressing institutions and organizational structures.

== Types ==
Environmental sustainability can be achieved through different types of innovation. Here are four key approaches:

=== Product innovation ===
Creating eco-friendly goods that meet consumer demands and lessen environmental damage. Examples include the use of non-toxic chemicals, biodegradable and compostable materials, and goods that require less energy when in use. Modular designs that provide simpler maintenance and upgrades, extending product life and lowering the need for additional resources, are another example of product improvements.

=== Process innovation ===
The use of low-emission, energy-efficient, and cleaner manufacturing techniques in industrial processes. This involves setting up closed-loop water or material systems to decrease resource usage and pollution during industrial operations, using renewable energy inside production lines, and using sophisticated manufacturing technologies that minimise waste and emissions.

=== Business model innovation ===
Creating and adopting new ways of delivering value that align profitability with sustainability, such as product-as-a-service models, leasing systems, and sharing platforms. These models encourage users to access rather than own products, promoting higher utilisation rates, enabling take-back and reuse systems by maintaining control over product life cycles to facilitate reuse, refurbishment, or recycling.

=== System-Level innovation ===
Promoting significant changes in cities and industries to promote sustainable development. Examples include creating integrated zero-waste industrial parks, constructing smart city systems to maximise energy and resource use.

== Challenges ==
Environmental sustainable innovation faces multiple challenges that can slow adoption and effectiveness despite its critical role in sustainability transitions:

- High Upfront Costs: Developing sustainable technologies and processes often involves significant initial investments in research, establishing production systems, and building new infrastructure.
- Technological and Market Uncertainty: Many eco-innovations involve emerging technologies with unproven reliability at scale, leading to concerns about maintenance and return on investment. Additionally, limited consumer demand for green products can hinder market development, making it challenging for innovators to justify early adoption.
- Regulatory Complexity: Inconsistent or fragmented environmental policies across regions can create uncertainty, making firms hesitant to invest in eco-innovations without clear, stable policy signals or supportive frameworks.
- Market Resistance and Consumer Behaviour: Even when green technologies are available, persistent consumer habits, limited awareness of environmental benefits, and perceptions of higher costs can slow their adoption, requiring targeted education and incentives to shift demand.
- Infrastructure Constraints: Many sustainable innovations depend on supporting infrastructure such as renewable energy grids, electric vehicle charging networks, and advanced recycling systems.

== See also ==
- Eco-innovation
- Sustainable energy
- European Green Deal
- Waste management
