= 2008 Bahrain Grand Prix =

Coordinates: 26°1′57″N 50°30′38″E

Race 3 of 18 in the 2008 Formula One World Championship
| ← Previous race | Next race → |

Race details
- Date: 6 April 2008
- Official name: 2008 Formula 1 Gulf Air Bahrain Grand Prix
- Location: Bahrain International Circuit; Sakhir, Bahrain
- Course: Permanent racing facility
- Course length: 5.412 km (3.363 miles)
- Distance: 57 laps, 308.238 km (191.539 miles)
- Weather: Dry
- Attendance: 100,000 (Weekend)

Pole position
| Driver | (Poland) Robert Kubica | BMW Sauber |
- Time: 1:33.096

Fastest lap
| Driver | (Finland) Heikki Kovalainen | McLaren-Mercedes |
- Time: 1:33.193 on lap 49

Podium
| First | (Brazil) Felipe Massa | Ferrari |
| Second | (Finland) Kimi Räikkönen | Ferrari |
| Third | (Poland) Robert Kubica | BMW Sauber |

The 2008 Bahrain Grand Prix (formally the 2008 Formula 1 Gulf Air Bahrain Grand Prix) was a Formula One motor race held on 6 April 2008 at the Bahrain International Circuit, in Sakhir, Bahrain. It was the third race of the 2008 Formula One World Championship. Felipe Massa for the Ferrari team won the 57-lap race. Kimi Räikkönen was second in the other Ferrari, and BMW Sauber driver Robert Kubica was third.

The race began with Kubica in pole position alongside Massa; this was the only time in his career that the Pole would be on pole. Lewis Hamilton, the eventual World Drivers' Champion, started from third, alongside Räikkönen. Kubica was passed by Massa into the first corner, and then by Räikkönen on the third lap. The Ferraris dominated at the front of the race, leading to their first out of three 1–2 finishes of the season. Hamilton had a slow start after almost stalling on the grid, and dropped back to ninth. The McLaren driver ran into the back of Fernando Alonso's Renault a lap later, breaking off the McLaren's front wing and dropping Hamilton to the back of the field.

Kubica's strong finish promoted BMW Sauber to the lead in the World Constructors' Championship, after Heidfeld finished fourth. Ferrari and McLaren trailed, one and two points behind, respectively. Räikkönen took the lead in the Drivers' Championship, with 19 points, three points ahead of Heidfeld and five ahead of Hamilton, Kubica and Kovalainen, with 15 races remaining in the season.

== Background ==
The Grand Prix was contested by 22 drivers, in 11 teams of two. The teams, also known as "constructors", were Ferrari, McLaren-Mercedes, Renault, Honda, Force India, BMW Sauber, Toyota, Red Bull Racing, Williams, Toro Rosso and Super Aguri. Tyre supplier Bridgestone brought two different tyre compounds to the race; the softer of the two marked by a single white stripe down one of the grooves.

Prior to the race, McLaren driver Lewis Hamilton led the Drivers' Championship with 14 points, and Ferrari driver Kimi Räikkönen was second with 11 points. Behind Hamilton and Räikkönen in the Drivers' Championship, Nick Heidfeld was third, also with 11 points, in a BMW Sauber, and Hamilton's McLaren teammate Heikki Kovalainen was fourth with 10 points. Heidfeld's teammate Robert Kubica was fifth with eight points. In the Constructors' Championship, McLaren–Mercedes were leading with 24 points, five points ahead of BMW Sauber. Ferrari were third with 11 points.

Ferrari dominated the previous round in Malaysia, where Felipe Massa had claimed pole position, and led his teammate Räikkönen in second place through the opening stages of the race, before spinning off and retiring midway through. Räikkönen went on to win the race, and expressed his optimism about Bahrain: "I have finished third in three successive Grands Prix in Bahrain. Time and again something has gone wrong. Sakhir is one of those circuits where I really want to win. Finally."

In the opening two races, Massa came under fire from the press for two errors that left him without points: a collision with Red Bull driver David Coulthard in Australia and his spin at Malaysia. Massa promised that the first two races would not be indicative of the rest of the season: "It was not the start to the season that I wanted, but there are still 16 races to go and 160 points up for grabs. In the next few races I plan to get back all the points I have lost in the opening two rounds."

Hamilton won the opening race in Australia, but managed to finish only fifth after a qualifying penalty and a botched pit stop in Malaysia. The season began well for Kubica, as he qualified second in Australia and finished second in Malaysia. Kubica predicted his team could maintain their momentum into the third race: "I'm confident that we can be very competitive here as well."

A week before the start of the Grand Prix weekend, the News of the World alleged that Max Mosley, the president of Formula One's governing body, the Fédération Internationale de l'Automobile (FIA), had engaged in sexual acts with five prostitutes. While Mosley denied the allegations, he cancelled his scheduled appearance at the Bahrain Grand Prix. Several teams condemned Mosley's alleged actions and asked for his resignation, and while for a time the controversy threatened to overshadow the race, Mosley eventually retained his position and successfully sued the News of the World for the report.

== Practice ==
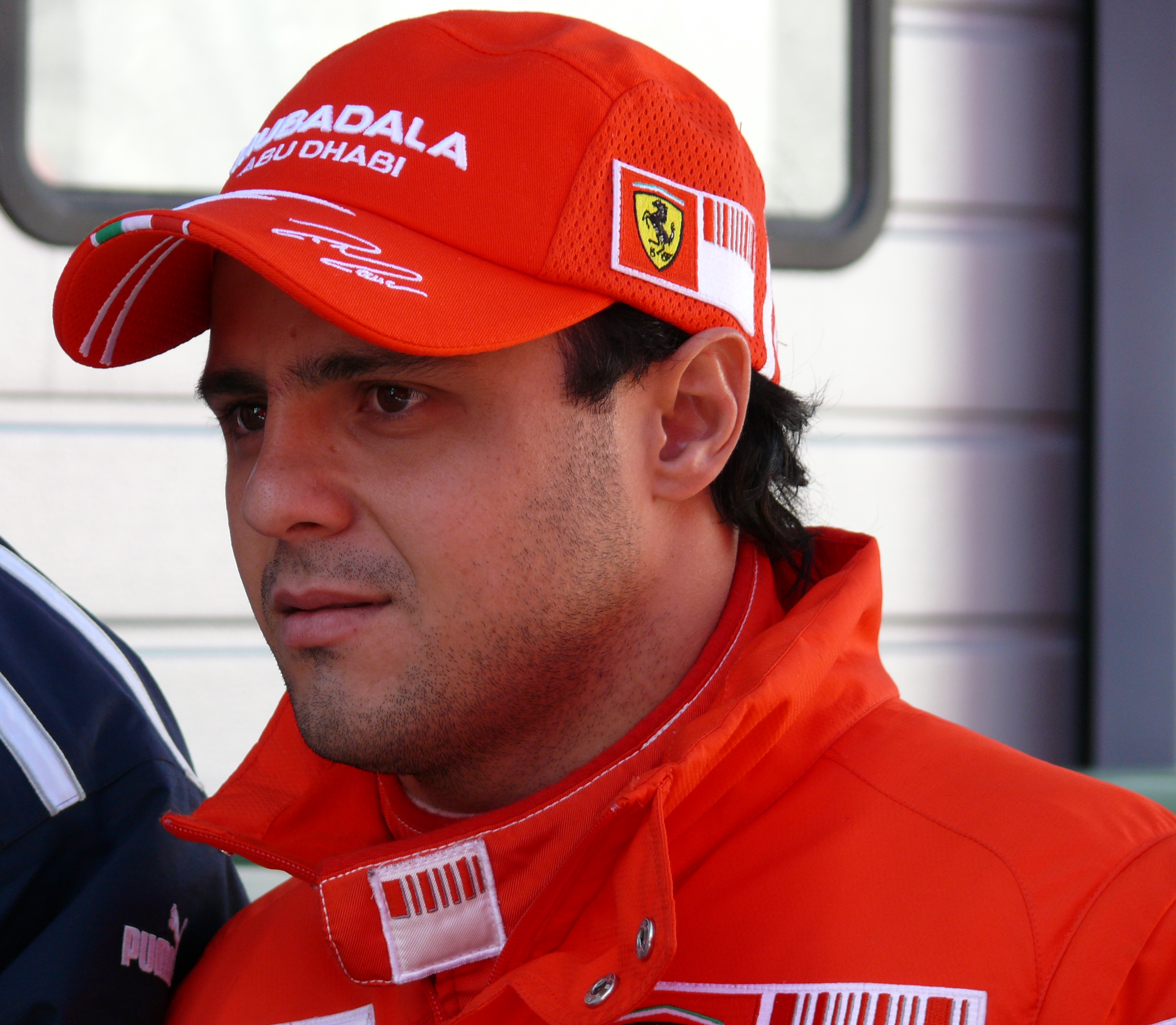
Felipe Massa

Three practice sessions were held before the Sunday race—two on Friday, and a third on Saturday. The Friday morning and afternoon sessions each lasted 90 minutes. The third session was held on Saturday morning and lasted an hour. The Ferraris outpaced the other teams in the first session on a dusty track surrounded by the sand dune desert of Sakhir. Massa's time of 1:32.233 was quicker than Räikkönen's, who was slowed down by an early excursion across the sand, requiring a pit stop. Nico Rosberg of Williams, Hamilton, McLaren driver Heikki Kovalainen, Williams driver Kazuki Nakajima and Kubica rounded out the top seven. In the second session, Hamilton lost control of his car and slid sideways into a wall. Hamilton emerged unharmed from the collision, but his McLaren suffered significant damage. Except for the crash, the second session ended like the first: once again, Massa led Räikkönen to Ferrari 1–2, ahead of Kovalainen, Hamilton and Kubica. The third session was again held on a dusty track, where Rosberg was quickest with a time of 1:32.521. Massa took second, ahead of Red Bull driver Mark Webber, Toyota driver Jarno Trulli, David Coulthard of Red Bull, Nakajima and Kubica. Räikkönen was ninth quickest, and Hamilton 18th.

== Qualifying ==
The qualifying session on Saturday afternoon was split into three parts. The first part ran for 20 minutes, and cars that finished the session 17th position or lower were eliminated from qualifying. The second part of the qualifying session lasted 15 minutes and eliminated cars that finished in positions 11 to 16. The final part of the qualifying session determined the positions from first to tenth, and decided pole position. Cars which failed to make the final session could refuel before the race, so ran lighter in those sessions. Cars which competed in the final session of qualifying were not allowed to refuel before the race, and as such carried more fuel than in the previous sessions.

I am very happy. I missed the chance to take pole position in Australia, but this time it worked out well ... We knew before the season that the car was good due to the results of the computer simulation and the wind tunnel work. Finally it has paid off that we never gave up working hard. I want to thank the entire team who have worked so hard over the last months. We will now study the data and prepare for tomorrow. A long race lies ahead of us.

— Robert Kubica, following the third qualifying session.

Kubica clinched the first pole position of his career with a time of 1:33.096. Massa qualified less than 0.03 seconds behind the BMW and joined Kubica on the front row of the grid. Hamilton took third place, using his team's spare chassis; Räikkönen was next quickest, and despite being critical of his car's set-up was confident in its racing ability. Kovalainen would line up fifth on the grid alongside Heidfeld, who had trouble maximising performance from his tyres. Trulli took seventh place, ahead of Rosberg and Honda driver Jenson Button. Renault driver Fernando Alonso was the last driver to make the third session; Webber missed out on the top ten by 0.009 seconds and would start the race in 11th position. Button's teammate Rubens Barrichello took 12th place after a gearbox problem interrupted his second session laps, ahead of Timo Glock of Toyota, Nelson Piquet of Renault and Toro Rosso driver Sébastien Bourdais. Nakajima was the slowest of the second session drivers, and took 16th. Coulthard qualified 17th, ahead of Giancarlo Fisichella of Force India. Toro Rosso driver Sebastian Vettel took 19th, and blamed his set-up: "I felt it was more a case of the car driving me than me driving the car." Fisichella's teammate Adrian Sutil qualified 20th, ahead of Anthony Davidson of Super Aguri. Davidson's teammate Takuma Sato spun out and crashed into the barriers. Sato's accident damaged his rear wing and suspension and left him unable to continue in the session.

=== Qualifying classification ===
| Pos | No | Driver | Constructor | Part 1 | Part 2 | Part 3 | Grid |
|---|---|---|---|---|---|---|---|
| 1 | 4 | (Poland) Robert Kubica | BMW Sauber | 1:32.893 | 1:31.745 | 1:33.096 | 1 |
| 2 | 2 | (Brazil) Felipe Massa | Ferrari | 1:31.937 | 1:31.188 | 1:33.123 | 2 |
| 3 | 22 | (United Kingdom) Lewis Hamilton | McLaren-Mercedes | 1:32.750 | 1:31.922 | 1:33.292 | 3 |
| 4 | 1 | (Finland) Kimi Räikkönen | Ferrari | 1:32.652 | 1:31.933 | 1:33.418 | 4 |
| 5 | 23 | (Finland) Heikki Kovalainen | McLaren-Mercedes | 1:33.057 | 1:31.718 | 1:33.488 | 5 |
| 6 | 3 | (Germany) Nick Heidfeld | BMW Sauber | 1:33.137 | 1:31.909 | 1:33.737 | 6 |
| 7 | 11 | (Italy) Jarno Trulli | Toyota | 1:32.493 | 1:32.159 | 1:33.994 | 7 |
| 8 | 7 | (Germany) Nico Rosberg | Williams-Toyota | 1:32.903 | 1:32.185 | 1:34.015 | 8 |
| 9 | 16 | (United Kingdom) Jenson Button | Honda | 1:32.793 | 1:32.362 | 1:35.057 | 9 |
| 10 | 5 | (Spain) Fernando Alonso | Renault | 1:32.947 | 1:32.345 | 1:35.115 | 10 |
| 11 | 10 | (Australia) Mark Webber | Red Bull-Renault | 1:33.194 | 1:32.371 | | 11 |
| 12 | 17 | (Brazil) Rubens Barrichello | Honda | 1:32.944 | 1:32.508 | | 12 |
| 13 | 12 | (Germany) Timo Glock | Toyota | 1:32.800 | 1:32.528 | | 13 |
| 14 | 6 | (Brazil) Nelson Piquet Jr. | Renault | 1:32.975 | 1:32.790 | | 14 |
| 15 | 14 | (France) Sébastien Bourdais | Toro Rosso-Ferrari | 1:33.415 | 1:32.915 | | 15 |
| 16 | 8 | (Japan) Kazuki Nakajima | Williams-Toyota | 1:33.386 | 1:32.943 | | 16 |
| 17 | 9 | (United Kingdom) David Coulthard | Red Bull-Renault | 1:33.433 | | | 17 |
| 18 | 21 | (Italy) Giancarlo Fisichella | Force India-Ferrari | 1:33.501 | | | 18 |
| 19 | 15 | (Germany) Sebastian Vettel | Toro Rosso-Ferrari | 1:33.562 | | | 19 |
| 20 | 20 | (Germany) Adrian Sutil | Force India-Ferrari | 1:33.845 | | | 20 |
| 21 | 19 | (United Kingdom) Anthony Davidson | Super Aguri-Honda | 1:34.140 | | | 21 |
| 22 | 18 | (Japan) Takuma Sato | Super Aguri-Honda | 1:35.725 | | | 22 |

== Race ==
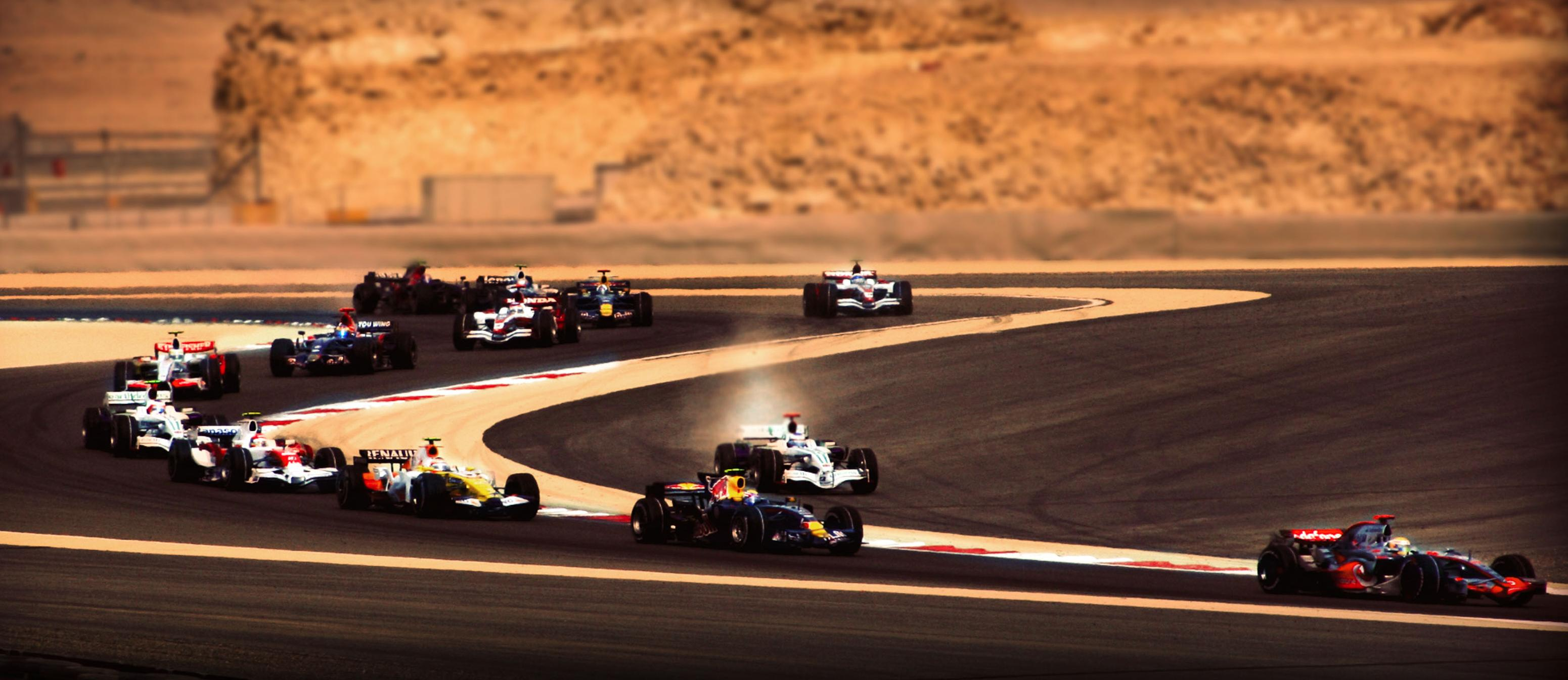
Jenson Button crosses the sand during the first lap of the race

The weather and conditions on the grid were before dry for the race. The air temperature was 29 °C (84 °F) with signs of a breeze which could blow sand onto the track and impede the cars' grip. Massa got the best start of the frontrunners off the line, as he passed Kubica into the first corner to take the lead. Hamilton's poor start caused his anti-stall system to kick in, and he was passed by six drivers to fall back to ninth. Räikkönen benefited from Hamilton's start by moving up to third, ahead of Kovalainen, Trulli and Heidfeld. As Massa extended his lead at the front of the race, Hamilton, who trailed Alonso, collided with the back of the Renault, knocking the McLaren's front wing off the car. Suffering handling difficulties, Hamilton returned to the pit-lane for a new nose section, and rejoined in 18th place. Räikkönen took second place when he passed Kubica on lap three; Heidfeld took fourth when he passed Trulli and Kovalainen in separate manoeuvres. Further down the field, Vettel retired from the race on the first lap after twice colliding with other cars; Button, Sutil and Coulthard pitted to repair early damage.

By lap 10, Massa had opened his lead over Räikkönen to 4.4 seconds, ahead of Kubica, Heidfeld, Kovalainen and Trulli. Kubica was the first of the frontrunners to pit, on lap 17. Räikkönen and Trulli followed on lap 20; Massa pitted from the lead one lap later. Following the first round of pit stops, the gap between the Ferraris was 5.4 seconds, however by lap 31 Räikkönen had closed to within four seconds of his teammate. Massa held a 3.6 second lead over Räikkönen when the two Ferraris pitted for the final time on laps 39 and 38, respectively, and Massa retained his lead into the final stint. Kubica pitted on lap 41, Heidfeld on lap 45, and Kovalainen on lap 47.

Coulthard and Button collided on lap 18 when Button attempted to pass the Red Bull on the inside at turn eight; the Honda lost its front wing and retired a lap later after two pit stops. Hamilton continued his climb back through the field; he moved from 18th, passing Piquet, Davidson, Sutil and Bourdais in separate manoeuvres, to sit in 14th by the time he pitted on lap 31. Piquet retired on lap 42 with transmission failure, requiring a gearbox change before the next race.

Massa took his first win of the season when he crossed the line at the end of the 57th lap, 3.3 seconds ahead of the second-placed Räikkönen. Kubica took third, ahead of his teammate Heidfeld, and Kovalainen, who set the fastest lap of the race on lap 49, with a time of 1:33.193, despite being slower than the frontrunners for much of the race. Trulli, Webber, Glock and Alonso rounded out the top ten, after Glock's Toyota held off a quick Alonso late in the race. Barrichello and Fisichella finished strongly, ahead of Hamilton, who managed only 13th. Nakajima, Bourdais, Davidson and Sato took the next four places; Coulthard and Sutil finished last on track after their respective crashes demoted them to the back of the field. Vettel, Button and Piquet were the three retirements from the race.

=== Post-race ===
It didn't change anything starting second because we had a good a start. I think Robert [Kubica] didn't have a good start and I passed him. Then the race was pretty difficult in the beginning because there was a lot of oil on the track. We almost went off, me and Robert, and it was pretty difficult. During the race the car was just very good. I didn't push completely to the limit because I saw the gap increasing and then Kimi [Räikkönen] was behind but I could manage to keep the gap to him and the strategy was perfect as well.

— Felipe Massa, speaking after the race.

The top three finishers appeared on the podium and in the subsequent press conference, where Massa appeared relieved: "For sure the race was pretty difficult because I didn't want to make any mistakes. I didn't push as much either, just tried to bring the car home and just controlling the pace as well." Massa said that he struggled with grip early, owing to oil in the middle sector of the course. Räikkönen's second place promoted him to the lead in the Drivers' Championship, and he expressed his optimism about future races:

The whole weekend has been pretty difficult, one of those things when we cannot really get the car right ... We are leading the Championship which is the main thing and we know that we have the speed once we get everything right. The race was quite difficult but anyhow I am happy with second.

Kubica said that his poor start was due to wheelspin off the line, and the presence of oil on the track impeded the performance of his car, leading to Räikkönen's pass: "But anyway I think it was a good result: third and fourth for the team and leading the Constructors' Championship, so it was good weekend."

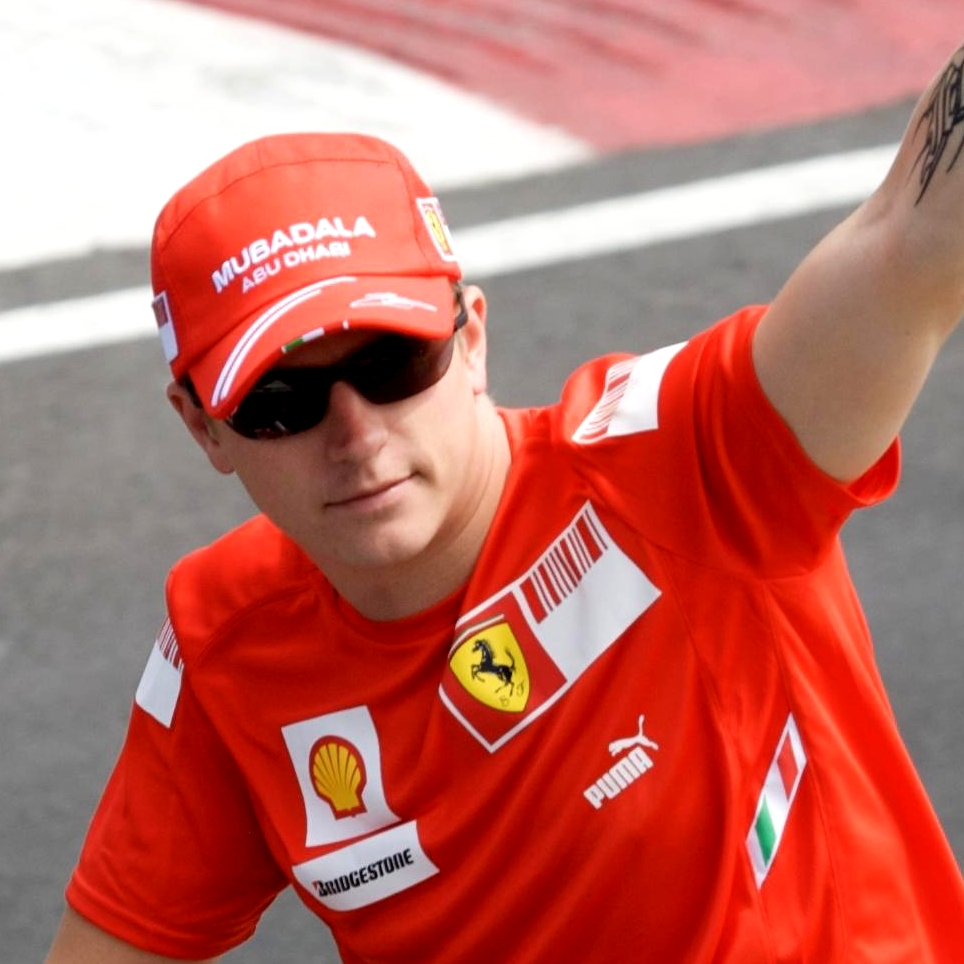
Kimi Räikkönen

Hamilton accepted responsibility for his near stall on the grid: "I hadn't hit the switch early enough and therefore we were not in the launch map and went straight into anti-stall, and when everyone else was in their launch mode, I wasn't." Renault dismissed suggestions that Alonso had brake tested Hamilton in the incident that led to the McLaren's wing breaking off. Pat Symonds, Renault's head of engineering, said his team's telemetry indicated Alonso was on full throttle down the straight, and had not touched the brakes: "I think all I can say from our side is that there is no blame attributable to Fernando, which is what some of the speculation might be." McLaren F1 CEO Martin Whitmarsh said that Hamilton's front wing had broken seconds before the impact, and that the resulting downforce reduction had sucked Hamilton into Alonso's slipstream faster than expected. However, photos indicate that the front wing on the McLaren could have broken even earlier when Hamilton nudged a car (believed to be Alonso) on the opening lap. The later incident left Alonso with damage to the back of the car, impairing his attempts to pass Glock late in the race.

Räikkönen's second-placed finish gave him a three-point lead over Heidfeld in the Drivers' Championship, with 19 points, ahead of Heidfeld with 16, followed by Hamilton, Kubica and Kovalainen, each with 14 points. BMW Sauber's strong performance gave them the lead in the Constructors' Championship, with 30 points, ahead of Ferrari with 29 points and McLaren with 28 points.

=== Race classification ===
| Pos | No | Driver | Constructor | Laps | Time/Retired | Grid | Points |
|---|---|---|---|---|---|---|---|
| 1 | 2 | (Brazil) Felipe Massa | Ferrari | 57 | 1:31:06.970 | 2 | 10 |
| 2 | 1 | (Finland) Kimi Räikkönen | Ferrari | 57 | + 3.339 | 4 | 8 |
| 3 | 4 | (Poland) Robert Kubica | BMW Sauber | 57 | + 4.998 | 1 | 6 |
| 4 | 3 | (Germany) Nick Heidfeld | BMW Sauber | 57 | + 8.409 | 6 | 5 |
| 5 | 23 | (Finland) Heikki Kovalainen | McLaren-Mercedes | 57 | + 26.789 | 5 | 4 |
| 6 | 11 | (Italy) Jarno Trulli | Toyota | 57 | + 41.314 | 7 | 3 |
| 7 | 10 | (Australia) Mark Webber | Red Bull-Renault | 57 | + 45.473 | 11 | 2 |
| 8 | 7 | (Germany) Nico Rosberg | Williams-Toyota | 57 | + 55.889 | 8 | 1 |
| 9 | 12 | (Germany) Timo Glock | Toyota | 57 | + 1:09.500 | 13 | |
| 10 | 5 | (Spain) Fernando Alonso | Renault | 57 | + 1:17.181 | 10 | |
| 11 | 17 | (Brazil) Rubens Barrichello | Honda | 57 | + 1:17.862 | 12 | |
| 12 | 21 | (Italy) Giancarlo Fisichella | Force India-Ferrari | 56 | + 1 lap | 18 | |
| 13 | 22 | (United Kingdom) Lewis Hamilton | McLaren-Mercedes | 56 | + 1 lap | 3 | |
| 14 | 8 | (Japan) Kazuki Nakajima | Williams-Toyota | 56 | + 1 lap | 16 | |
| 15 | 14 | (France) Sébastien Bourdais | Toro Rosso-Ferrari | 56 | + 1 lap | 15 | |
| 16 | 19 | (United Kingdom) Anthony Davidson | Super Aguri-Honda | 56 | + 1 lap | 21 | |
| 17 | 18 | (Japan) Takuma Sato | Super Aguri-Honda | 56 | + 1 lap | 22 | |
| 18 | 9 | (United Kingdom) David Coulthard | Red Bull-Renault | 56 | + 1 lap | 17 | |
| 19 | 20 | (Germany) Adrian Sutil | Force India-Ferrari | 55 | + 2 laps | 20 | |
| Ret | 6 | (Brazil) Nelson Piquet Jr. | Renault | 40 | Gearbox | 14 | |
| Ret | 16 | (United Kingdom) Jenson Button | Honda | 19 | Collision | 9 | |
| Ret | 15 | (Germany) Sebastian Vettel | Toro Rosso-Ferrari | 0 | Collision | 19 | |

== Championship standings after the race ==
Drivers' Championship standings

| | Pos. | Driver | Points |
|---|---|---|---|
| 1 | 1 | (Finland) Kimi Räikkönen | 19 |
| 1 | 2 | (Germany) Nick Heidfeld | 16 |
| 2 | 3 | (United Kingdom) Lewis Hamilton | 14 |
| 1 | 4 | (Poland) Robert Kubica | 14 |
| 1 | 5 | (Finland) Heikki Kovalainen | 14 |

Constructors' Championship standings

| | Pos. | Constructor | Points |
|---|---|---|---|
| 1 | 1 | (Germany) BMW Sauber | 30 |
| 1 | 2 | (Italy) Ferrari | 29 |
| 2 | 3 | (United Kingdom) McLaren-Mercedes | 28 |
| | 4 | (United Kingdom) Williams-Toyota | 10 |
| 1 | 5 | (Japan) Toyota | 8 |

- Note: Only the top five positions are included for both sets of standings.

== See also ==
- 2008 Bahrain GP2 Asia Series round
- 2008 Bahrain Speedcar Series round

| Previous race: 2008 Malaysian Grand Prix | FIA Formula One World Championship; 2008 season | Next race: 2008 Spanish Grand Prix |
| Previous race: 2007 Bahrain Grand Prix | Bahrain Grand Prix | Next race: 2009 Bahrain Grand Prix |
