= Prodrive F1 =

Proposed Formula One team

- Full name: Prodrive F1 Team
- Founder(s): David Richards

Formula One World Championship career
- Races entered: 0
- Constructors' Championships: 0
- Drivers' Championships: 0
- Race victories: 0
- Podiums: 0
- Points: 0
- Pole positions: 0
- Fastest laps: 0

Prodrive F1 Team was the name of a proposed Formula One team to be run by Prodrive. The team was selected by the FIA in 2006 to be the 12th entry into the 2008 Formula One world championship. In November 2007, a legal challenge to the team's proposed use of customer cars led to Prodrive pulling out of the 2008 season.

In 2009, Prodrive boss David Richards announced that either Prodrive or Aston Martin Racing would appear in F1 from 2010 should the budget caps planned be acceptable. Prodrive Ltd. is based in Banbury, England, but has unveiled plans to relocate to a new 200-acre (81 ha) motorsport facility called "The Fulcrum" (based at the former RAF Honiley airfield) near Wroxall, Warwickshire.

== Entry into F1 ==
=== 2008 attempt ===
On 28 April 2006, rallying and motorsports technology firm Prodrive were officially granted entry to Formula One when the FIA announced the list of entrants to the 2008 Formula One World Championship. While a total of 22 teams applied for entry, the FIA had always maintained that, for reasons of both safety and practicality, only 12 teams would be granted entry, meaning only one new team would line up on the grid in 2008.

FIA president Max Mosley was impressed by Prodrive's bid, which beat off stiff competition from Carlin Motorsport, the Jean Alesi-led and McLaren-supported Direxiv outfit, BAR co-founder Craig Pollock, former Minardi owner Paul Stoddart and ex-Jordan Grand Prix team principal, Eddie Jordan.

Mosley revealed that Prodrive had found the finances to support their bid, adding: "Prodrive have the best combination of financial backing, technical capability and motor sport experience and are well known to the FIA through their participation in the World Rally Championship. Also, Prodrive's chief executive, David Richards, has experience as a Formula One team principal". Richards has previously acted as team principal of the Benetton and British American Racing teams.

According to some reports, Prodrive F1 was to use Mercedes engines and McLaren MP4-22 cars. During the 2007 season, McLaren boss Ron Dennis denied that the partnership had been finalised. Discussions with other potential suppliers of cars, including Renault, were also carried out. On 25 April 2007, it was announced that Prodrive had attracted a title sponsor for 2008. The same article also referenced Gary Paffett for a race drive citing his "one year" contract in DTM and with McLaren as a test driver. There were also rumours linking DTM driver Bruno Spengler, ex-F1 driver and McLaren tester Pedro de la Rosa and ex-McLaren test driver Alexander Wurz to the team. By October 2007, it was believed that the team had an agreement in place to use McLaren-Mercedes cars, at a cost of around $100M.

Although David Richards also led the consortium which owns Aston Martin, he ruled out the Aston Martin brand entering F1.

Although the FIA had announced in 2006 that customer cars would be permitted from the 2008 season, the 2007 season saw complaints against two teams, Scuderia Toro Rosso and Super Aguri F1, believed by other teams to already be using customer cars. The use of customer cars (cars built by a constructor entered in the F1 championship and sold to another entrant) is forbidden by the Concorde Agreement. The Concorde Agreement is the contract between the FIA, the F1 teams and Formula One Administration which dictates the terms by which the teams compete in races and take their share of the television revenues and prize money. As the Concorde Agreement was scheduled to expire at the end of 2007 and a succeeding Agreement had not yet been finalised, in October 2007 the Williams team challenged Prodrive's proposed use of customer cars for its entry to the 2008 championship in the FIA's International Court of Appeal.

Following lengthy negotiations between president Mosley and Richards, including a request that the team be allowed to enter from mid-season, Richards announced on 23 November 2007 that Prodrive F1 would not compete in the 2008, as the legal situation left no time for the team to be set up for the start of the season. "It is still our ambition to compete in Formula One," Prodrive said in a statement. "We are hopeful that a new Concorde Agreement between the FIA, FOA (Formula One Administration) and teams will provide clarity as to the terms on which this might be possible. When this new agreement is reached, we will be in a position to consider the extent to which we can adapt our plans for participation in the future." In an interview Richards said that he would have wanted Pedro de la Rosa and Lucas di Grassi as his drivers for the 2008 season.

=== Further attempts ===
When Honda withdrew at the end of 2008, Richards was linked to buying out the team and using it as an output for Prodrive, but Ross Brawn and the rest of the team's management bought out the team instead, becoming Brawn GP.

In May 2009, Richards lodged an entry for the 2010 Formula One season. If successful, it would have allowed the Aston Martin name to return to Formula One (which ultimately occurred in 2021, when the former Racing Point F1 Team was purchased and rebranded). On 12 June 2009 it was announced by the FIA that Prodrive's entry for 2010 had not been accepted. Prodrive stated in a press release that they were 'disappointed'.

In early December 2009, there were reports in the media suggesting that Renault were looking to sell their team ahead of the 2010 F1 season. Bernie Ecclestone, the commercial rights holder for Formula One, revealed on 7 December 2009 that Richards' Prodrive was one of four potential bidders. Reports suggested that Prodrive's proposal would have seen Renault withdraw from the sport as a manufacturer, but remain in place as an engine supplier.
