= 2008 Formula One World Championship =

59th season of the FIA Formula One World Championship

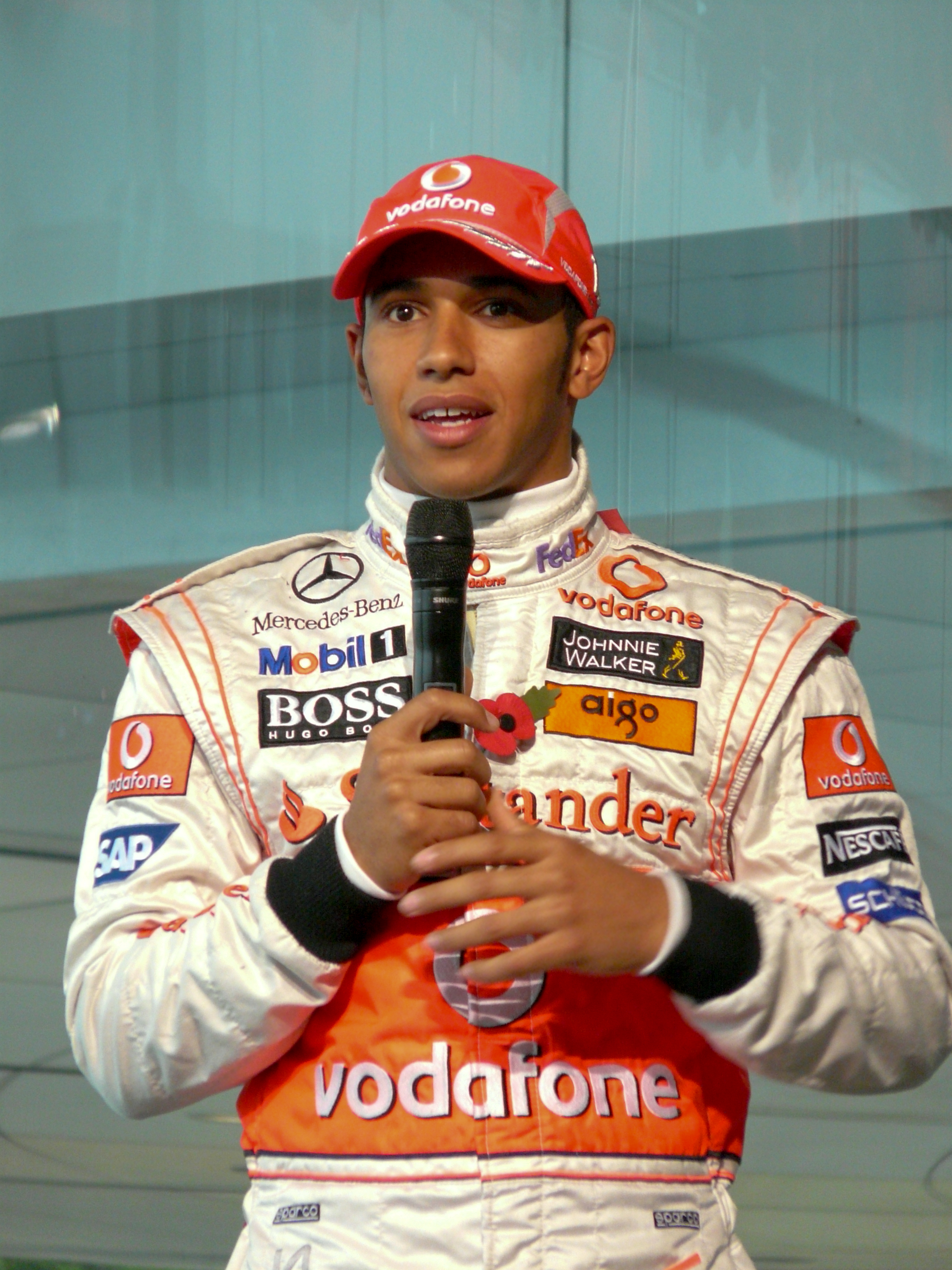
Lewis Hamilton won the first of his seven World Championship titles in 2008, in his second year of F1 participation.

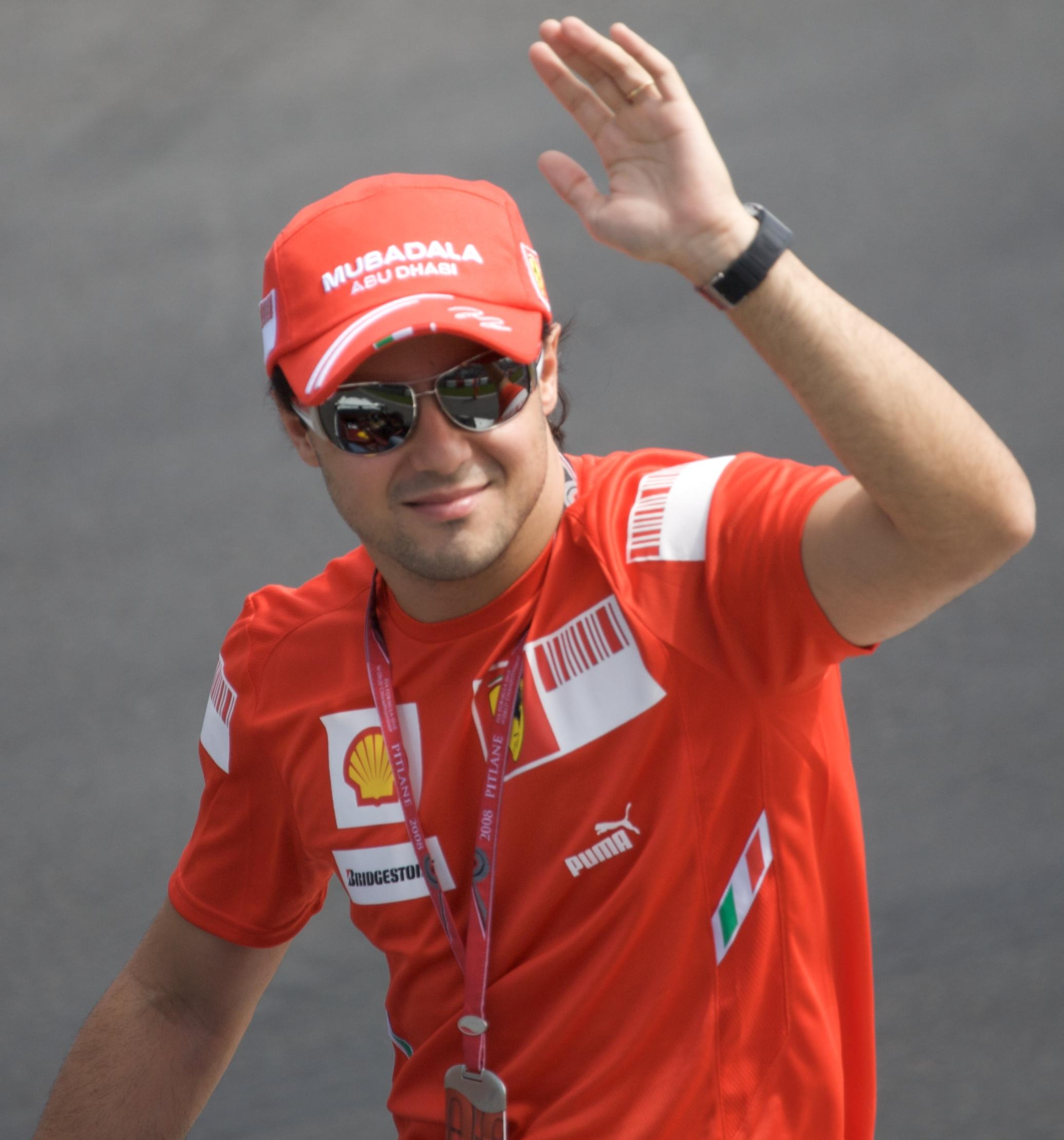
Felipe Massa finished runner up by a single point behind Hamilton.

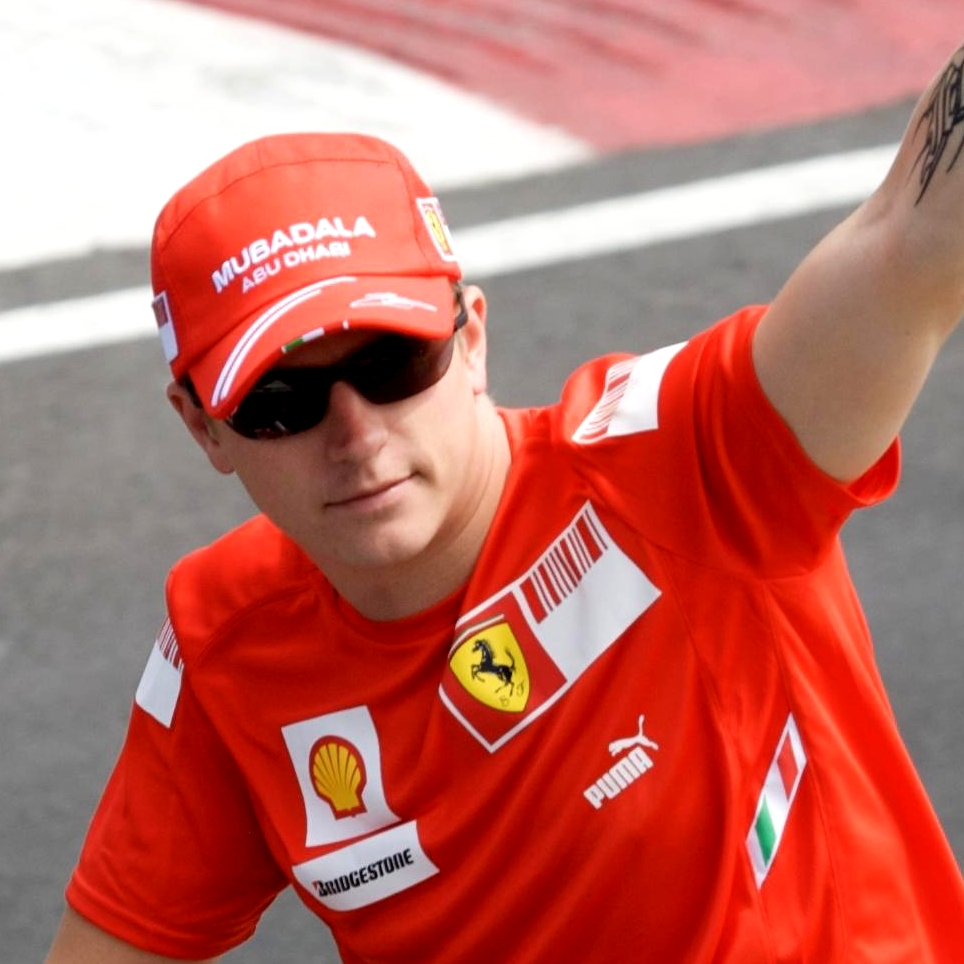
Kimi Räikkönen, the defending World Drivers' Champion, finished the season ranked 3rd.

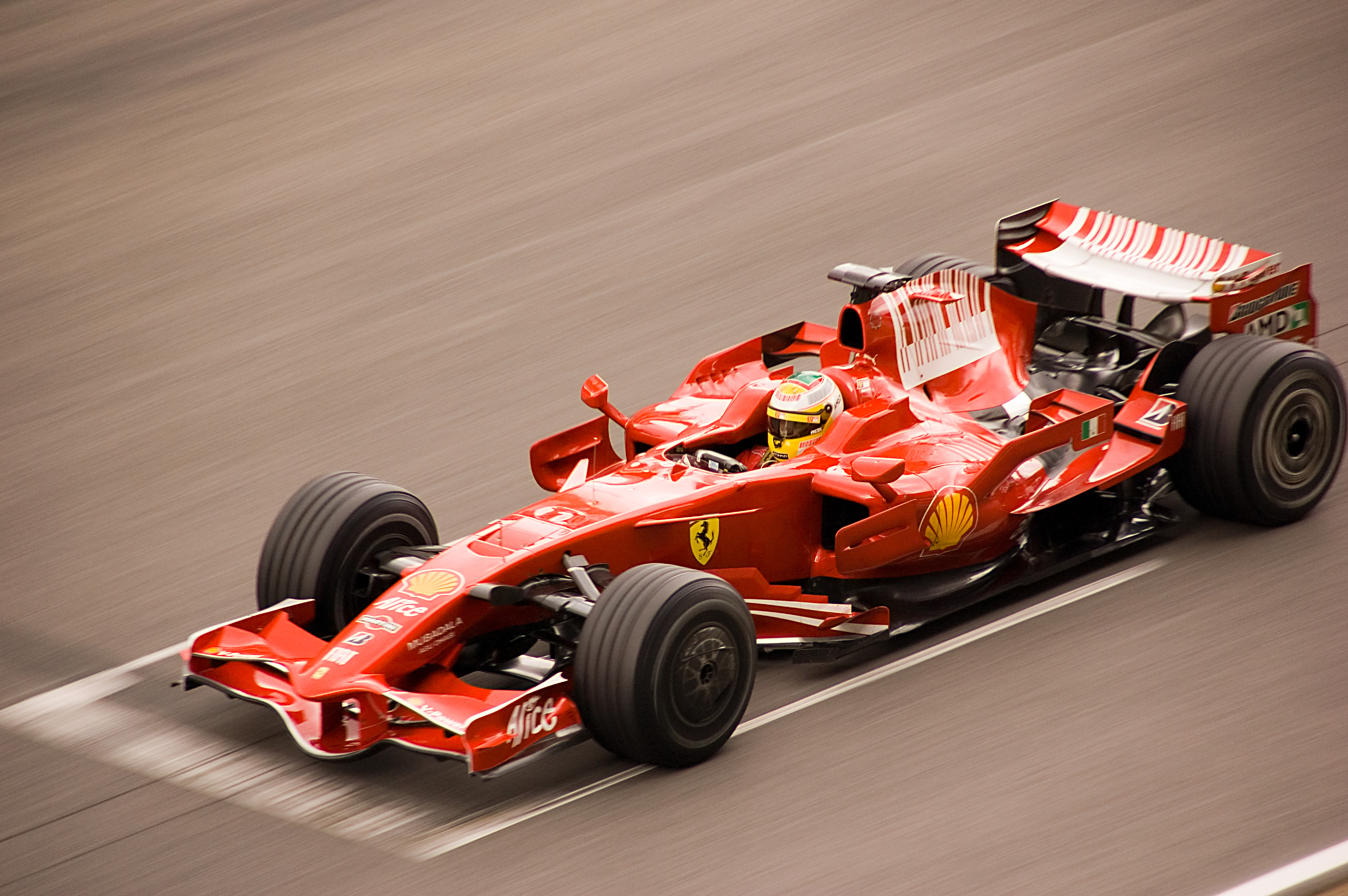
Ferrari took the Constructors' Championship for the second year in a row, their sixteenth overall.

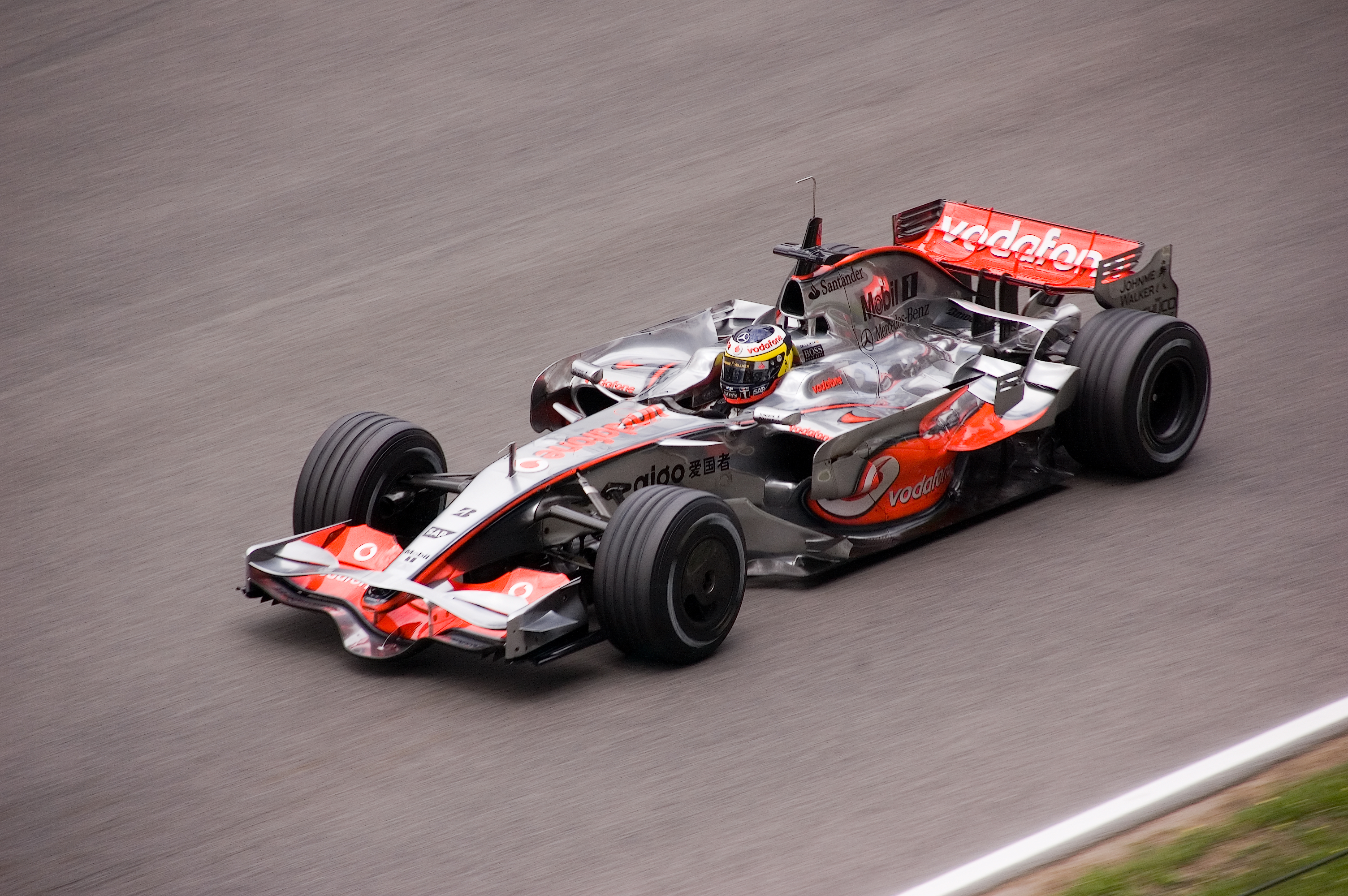
McLaren-Mercedes finished second in the World Constructors' Championship.

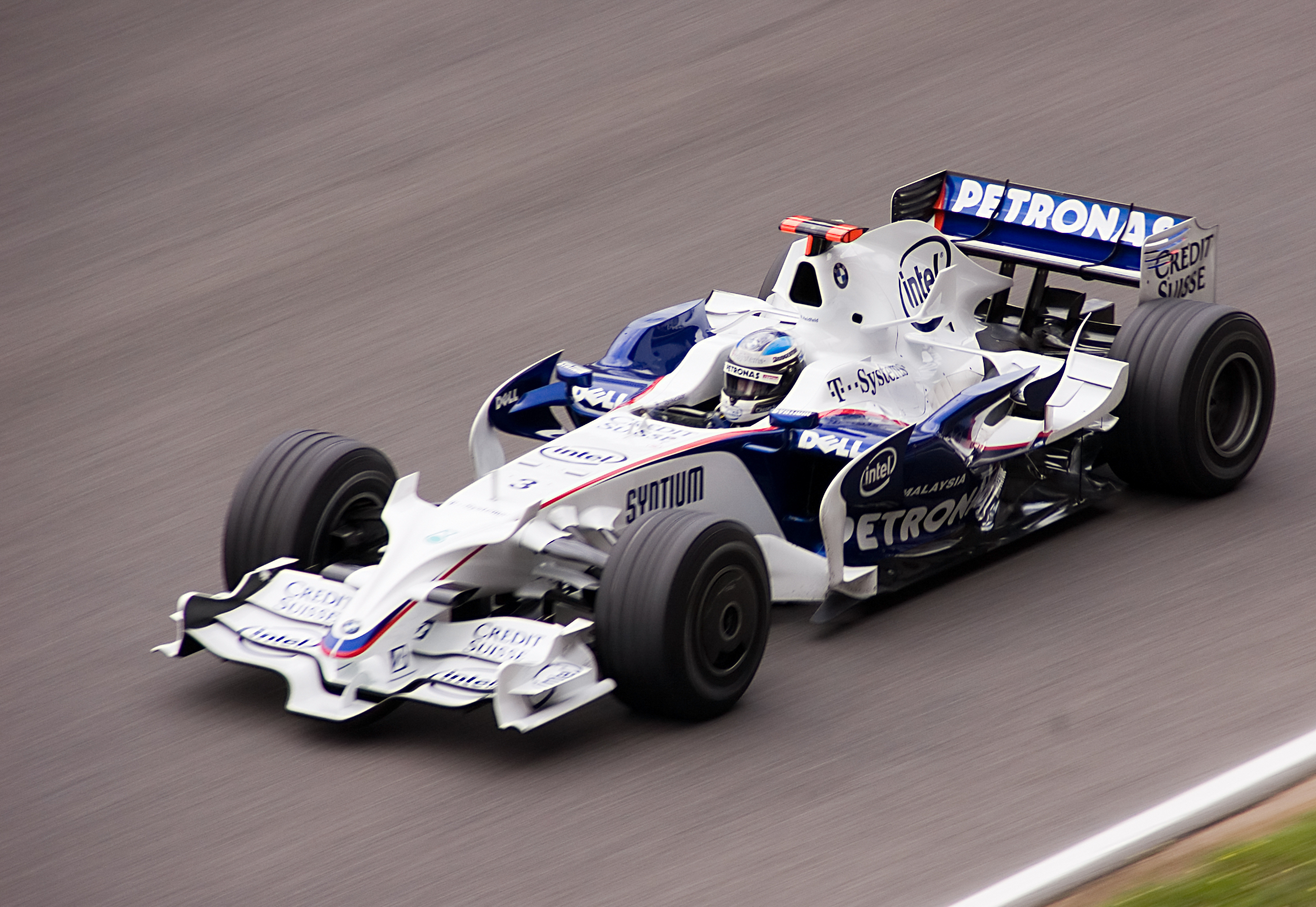
BMW Sauber finished third in the World Constructors' Championship.

The 2008 FIA Formula One World Championship was the 62nd season of Formula One motor racing, recognised by the Fédération Internationale de l'Automobile (FIA) – the governing body of motorsport – as the highest class of competition for open-wheel racing cars. The championship was contested over eighteen races commencing in Australia on 16 March and ending in Brazil on 2 November. The 2008 season saw the debut of the Singapore Grand Prix, which was held at the Marina Bay Street Circuit, in Marina Bay, Singapore, and was the first Formula One race held at night. The European Grand Prix moved to a new venue at the Valencia Street Circuit, in Valencia, Spain.

Lewis Hamilton won the Drivers' title by a single point – by overtaking Toyota's Timo Glock on the final corner of the final lap of the final Grand Prix of the season to claim the required 5th-place finish to win the championship – from Brazilian Felipe Massa, who had finished the race in first place; his team and family already celebrating the championship when the final overtake occurred. Massa's teammate, the reigning World Champion Kimi Räikkönen, was ranked third, with two wins after suffering a mid-season dip in form. Scuderia Ferrari Marlboro won the Constructors' title. In winning the Drivers' title, Hamilton became the youngest driver to win the title (the record has subsequently been broken) (Note: Two drivers have since won the title aged younger than Hamilton: Sebastian Vettel was five months younger than Hamilton when he won his maiden title in 2010. Kimi Antonelli was 3 years, seven months younger when he won the 2026 title.) and the first black driver to do so. He was also the first British champion since Damon Hill in 1996.

Eleven teams competed in the championship, although Super Aguri withdrew on 6 May due to financial troubles, having completed four races. New technical rules for 2008 included the banning of traction control after it was re-introduced in 2001, at the Spanish Grand Prix. Fernando Alonso won the first World Championship race held in Singapore; however, only after teammate Nelson Piquet Jr. deliberately crashed to cause a Safety Car period which helped Alonso's strategy. When Piquet admitted this to the press in 2009 Renault team-principal Flavio Briatore resigned. Some journalists dubbed this "Crashgate".

This was the last season for the Honda team before they withdrew from Formula One later in December due to the financial difficulties. Ross Brawn then bought the team, and renamed it to Brawn GP in February 2009 using the Mercedes-Benz engines. Honda returned as an engine supplier from 2015 to 2021. This was also the last Formula One season to race with grooved tyres, used since 1998, before slick tyres returned to Formula One in 2009. 2008 was the last season to feature 2001 runner up David Coulthard, who retired from racing in F1 after 14 years and 246 race starts. He would become a television pundit for the BBC ahead of the 2009 season.

2008 was the first year in the history of Formula One in which all teams used the same two drivers throughout the season, and the only year in which two Finnish drivers won races, Räikkönen in Malaysia and Spain and Heikki Kovalainen in Hungary. This season was the most recent World Drivers' Championship win by the driver of a McLaren until Lando Norris in 2025. 2008 also stands as the most recent World Constructors' Championship title win for Scuderia Ferrari.

== Teams and drivers ==
There were a total of seven teams signed up to compete in the championship through an agreement with Formula One Management, with the other four major manufacturers in the Grand Prix Manufacturers' Association (GPMA) having signed a Memorandum of Understanding at the 2006 Spanish Grand Prix. All teams in both groups had two spots each on the 2008 grid. The following teams and drivers competed in the 2008 FIA Formula One World Championship. Teams competed with tyres supplied by Bridgestone. McLaren was given the fifth pit position in Australia and Malaysia until their pit position was moved to the last in Bahrain.

Entrant	Constructor	Chassis	Engine^{†}	No.	Race drivers	Rounds
(Italy) Scuderia Ferrari	Ferrari	F2008	Ferrari 056 2008	1	(Finland) Kimi Räikkönen	All
(Italy) Scuderia Ferrari	Ferrari	F2008	Ferrari 056 2008	2	(Brazil) Felipe Massa	All
(Germany) BMW Sauber F1 Team	BMW Sauber	F1.08	BMW P86/8	3	(Germany) Nick Heidfeld	All
(Germany) BMW Sauber F1 Team	BMW Sauber	F1.08	BMW P86/8	4	(Poland) Robert Kubica	All
(France) ING Renault F1 Team	Renault	R28	Renault RS27	5	(Spain) Fernando Alonso	All
(France) ING Renault F1 Team	Renault	R28	Renault RS27	6	(Brazil) Nelson Piquet Jr.	All
(United Kingdom) AT&T Williams	Williams-Toyota	FW30	Toyota RVX-08	7	(Germany) Nico Rosberg	All
(United Kingdom) AT&T Williams	Williams-Toyota	FW30	Toyota RVX-08	8	(Japan) Kazuki Nakajima	All
(Austria) Red Bull Racing	Red Bull-Renault	RB4	Renault RS27	9	(United Kingdom) David Coulthard	All
(Austria) Red Bull Racing	Red Bull-Renault	RB4	Renault RS27	10	(Australia) Mark Webber	All
(Japan) Panasonic Toyota Racing	Toyota	TF108	Toyota RVX-08	11	(Italy) Jarno Trulli	All
(Japan) Panasonic Toyota Racing	Toyota	TF108	Toyota RVX-08	12	(Germany) Timo Glock	All
(Italy) Scuderia Toro Rosso	Toro Rosso-Ferrari	STR2B; STR3	Ferrari 056 2007	14	(France) Sébastien Bourdais	All
(Italy) Scuderia Toro Rosso	Toro Rosso-Ferrari	STR2B; STR3	Ferrari 056 2007	15	(Germany) Sebastian Vettel	All
(Japan) Honda Racing F1 Team	Honda	RA108	Honda RA808E	16	(United Kingdom) Jenson Button	All
(Japan) Honda Racing F1 Team	Honda	RA108	Honda RA808E	17	(Brazil) Rubens Barrichello	All
(Japan) Super Aguri F1 Team	Super Aguri-Honda	SA08	Honda RA808E	18	(Japan) Takuma Sato	1–4 (Note: Super Aguri withdrew from the Formula One World Championship on 6 May 2008, with immediate effect. The company went into administration a day later.)
(Japan) Super Aguri F1 Team	Super Aguri-Honda	SA08	Honda RA808E	19	(United Kingdom) Anthony Davidson	1–4
Force India F1 Team	Force India-Ferrari	VJM01	Ferrari 056 2007	20	(Germany) Adrian Sutil	All
Force India F1 Team	Force India-Ferrari	VJM01	Ferrari 056 2007	21	(Italy) Giancarlo Fisichella	All
(United Kingdom) Vodafone McLaren Mercedes	McLaren-Mercedes	MP4-23	Mercedes FO108V	22	(United Kingdom) Lewis Hamilton	All
(United Kingdom) Vodafone McLaren Mercedes	McLaren-Mercedes	MP4-23	Mercedes FO108V	23	(Finland) Heikki Kovalainen	All

- ^{†} All engines were 2.4-litre V8 configuration.

=== New entries ===
On 14 February 2006 the FIA president Max Mosley announced that all teams interested in competing in the 2008 World Championship would have a seven-day window during which they would have to submit an application to compete. All eleven current teams applied, as well as several others. On 28 April 2006 the FIA announced that all of the current teams' applications for the 2008 season were granted, along with a new team Prodrive, fronted by the ex-BAR and -Benetton principal David Richards. There were 21 applications in total, several new teams applying included European Minardi F1 Team Ltd, Jordan Grand Prix, Direxiv and Carlin Motorsport. However, despite the Prodrive application being accepted, Richards later announced that the team would not race in 2008 due to a dispute over the legality of customer cars.

=== Team changes ===
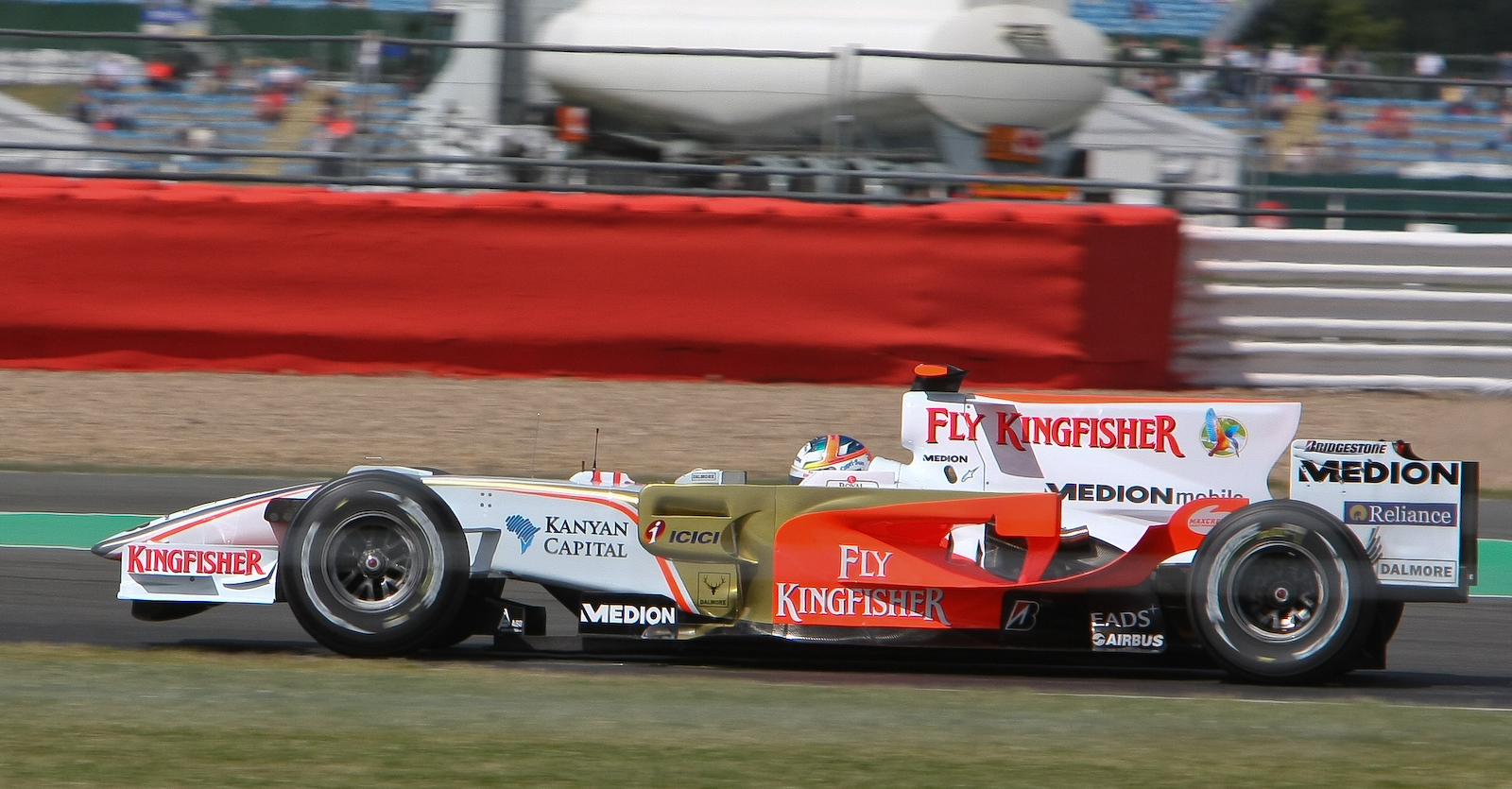
Force India joined the sport after Vijay Mallya purchased the Spyker team.

- Rumours about the possible sale of the Spyker team had been abundant in the paddock throughout the last few months of the 2007 season. Only a year after Spyker bought the team from Midland, Indian businessman Vijay Mallya bought the team for €88 million, several million more than Spyker paid. On 24 October 2007, Mallya was granted permission to change the team's name to Force India. Force India had a driver announcement ceremony in January 2008 where it was revealed that Sutil would be second driver partnered by first driver Giancarlo Fisichella and test driver Vitantonio Liuzzi.
- On 28 April 2006, rallying and motorsports technology firm Prodrive were officially granted entry to Formula One when the FIA announced the list of entrants to the 2008 Formula One World Championship. While a total of 21 teams applied for entry, the FIA had always maintained that only 12 teams would be granted entry, meaning only one new team would line up on the grid in 2008. FIA president Max Mosley revealed that Prodrive had found the finances to support their bid. Also, Prodrive's chief executive, David Richards, had experience as a Formula One team principal. However, on 23 November 2007, after lengthy negotiations between FIA president Max Mosley regarding customer cars, Richards announced that Prodrive F1 would not compete in the 2008 Formula One World Championship, as the legal situation left no time for the team to be set up.
- During the 2008 season on 6 May, the Super Aguri team folded and withdrew from Formula One. The team was in dire financial straits at the end of 2007 as the team did not receive a payment on a sponsorship deal. Super Aguri rejected a buyout offer in January 2008 from an Indian consortium led by the CEO of the Spice Group, on the condition Indian driver Narain Karthikeyan drove in the line-up, because it meant demoting or cutting one of the team's 2007 drivers. Despite this Super Aguri were unable to sign any contracts until agreements had been reached with their sponsors. Sato and Davidson were confirmed on 10 March. Super Aguri announced that a major deal had been made with Magma Group to solve the team's financial problems, however this fell through, and on 6 May 2008, Super Aguri withdrew from the Formula One World Championship. It affirmed a prediction at the start of the season by Max Mosley saying the team would not make it to the final race in Brazil.

=== Driver changes ===
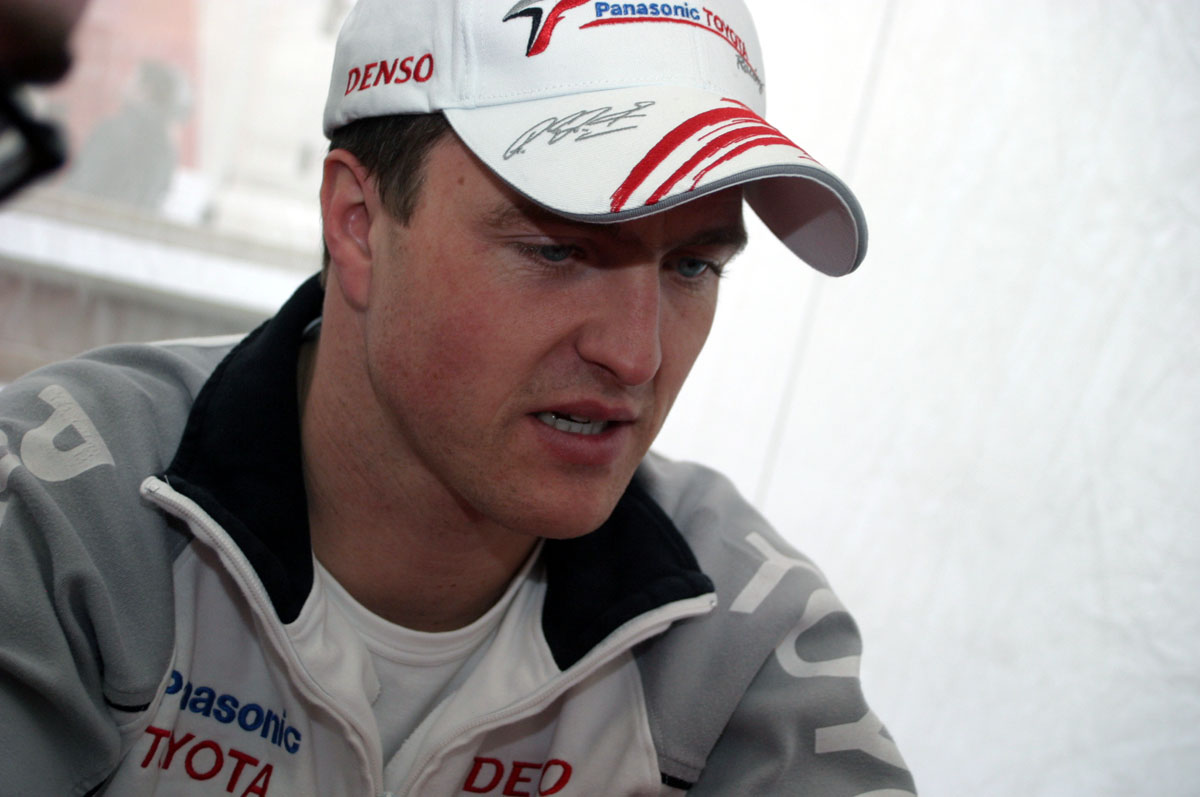
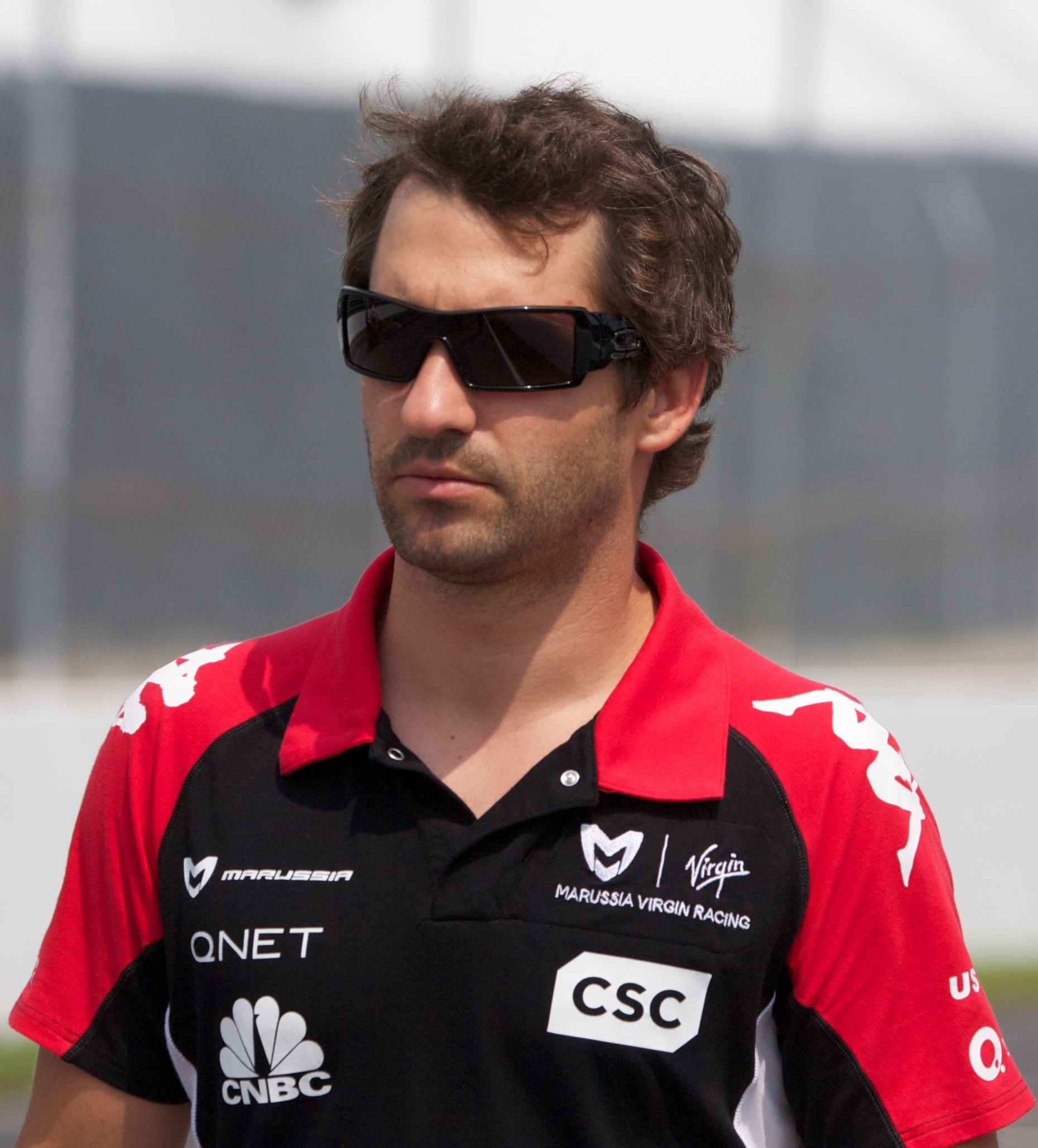
After competing in the sport for ten years, Ralf Schumacher (left) did not take part in the 2008 season. He was replaced at Toyota by 2007 GP2 Champion, Timo Glock (right).

2005 and 2006 World Champion Fernando Alonso left McLaren after a single season to rejoin Renault. He was replaced at McLaren by Heikki Kovalainen, who had replaced Alonso at Renault the previous season. Giancarlo Fisichella, Renault's other driver from 2007, moved to the newly renamed Force India team, in place of erstwhile Spyker driver Sakon Yamamoto, who became Renault's test development driver. Fisichella's place at Renault was taken by the team's test driver Nelson Piquet Jr. (son of the three-time World Drivers' Champion Nelson Piquet).

After an unsuccessful test for Force India in December 2007, Ralf Schumacher left Toyota to drive for Mücke Motorsport in the DTM series. 2007 GP2 champion Timo Glock, who had also been the test driver for BMW Sauber, returned to a Formula One race seat in place of Schumacher. Christian Klien, previously the test driver for Honda, and the Estonian driver Marko Asmer took up test driver roles at BMW Sauber.

Sébastien Bourdais, who won his fourth consecutive Champ Car title in 2007, joined Toro Rosso in 2008, replacing Vitantonio Liuzzi, who moved to Force India as their test driver.

== Calendar ==
The FIA World Council approved the 2008 schedule on 24 October 2007. Singapore was Formula One's first ever night race.

Round	Grand Prix	Circuit	Date
1	Australian Grand Prix	(Australia) Albert Park Circuit, Melbourne	16 March
2	Malaysian Grand Prix	(Malaysia) Sepang International Circuit, Kuala Lumpur	23 March
3	Bahrain Grand Prix	Bahrain International Circuit, Sakhir	6 April
4	Spanish Grand Prix	(Spain) Circuit de Catalunya, Montmeló	27 April
5	Turkish Grand Prix	(Turkey) Istanbul Park, Istanbul	11 May
6	Monaco Grand Prix	Circuit de Monaco, Monte Carlo	25 May
7	Canadian Grand Prix	(Canada) Circuit Gilles Villeneuve, Montreal	8 June
8	French Grand Prix	(France) Circuit de Nevers Magny-Cours, Magny-Cours	22 June
9	British Grand Prix	(United Kingdom) Silverstone Circuit, Silverstone	6 July
10	German Grand Prix	(Germany) Hockenheimring, Hockenheim	20 July
11	Hungarian Grand Prix	(Hungary) Hungaroring, Mogyoród	3 August
12	European Grand Prix	(Spain) Valencia Street Circuit, Valencia	24 August
13	Belgian Grand Prix	(Belgium) Circuit de Spa-Francorchamps, Stavelot	7 September
14	Italian Grand Prix	(Italy) Autodromo Nazionale di Monza, Monza	14 September
15	Singapore Grand Prix	Marina Bay Street Circuit, Singapore	28 September
16	Japanese Grand Prix	(Japan) Fuji Speedway, Oyama, Shizuoka	12 October
17	Chinese Grand Prix	(China) Shanghai International Circuit, Shanghai	19 October
18	Brazilian Grand Prix	(Brazil) Autódromo José Carlos Pace, São Paulo	2 November

=== Calendar changes ===
The new Marina Bay Street Circuit which hosted the Singapore Grand Prix at night

- Singapore hosted its first Grand Prix in 2008, with a contract for the next five years. The race, held on a street circuit designed by KBR, was Formula One's first night race. The practice and qualifying sessions also took place at night.
- The European Grand Prix took place at the Valencia Street Circuit in 2008, changing from the Nürburgring which hosted the event up until 2007. Because both German circuits share the right to host an F1 race, the German Grand Prix took place at Hockenheimring in 2008. It continued to alternate between these two circuits yearly until 2014.
- The Indianapolis Motor Speedway did not hold a Grand Prix in 2008; however, a possible return to Indianapolis in the future was not completely ruled out, although the United States Grand Prix made its return in 2012 at the Circuit of the Americas in Austin, Texas.
- In the run up to the 2007 French Grand Prix it was reported that it would be the last Grand Prix to be held at Magny-Cours. Some alternatives suggested for the French Grand Prix included Paul Ricard or a new circuit near Disneyland Paris or Charles de Gaulle Airport. However, on 24 July 2007 it was reported that Bernie Ecclestone had "agreed in principle to maintain the race at Magny-Cours in 2008, and even 2009, if there were no other alternatives".

== Regulation changes ==
- A standard Electronic Control Unit was supplied by Microsoft MES, a joint venture between Microsoft and McLaren Electronic Systems.
- Traction control was banned along with engine braking reduction.
- An engine freeze to last five years was started in 2008, with the first unscheduled engine change of the season not leading to the usual 10 place grid penalty.
- Fuel of the cars must have been made up of at least 5.75% biological materials.
- Gearboxes were required to last four races, with a 5 place grid penalty for a gear box change. If a driver did not finish a race, he was allowed to change the gearbox for the next race without receiving a penalty.
- Cockpit protection was improved.
- The use of a spare car was restricted. Each competing team would not be allowed to have more than two cars available for use at any time. In this context, a car was considered as such if it was a partially assembled survival cell, fitted with an engine, any front suspension, bodywork, radiators, oil tanks or heat exchangers.
- Bridgestone would be the official tyre supplier for the 2008–2010 seasons. They would also be marking their extreme wet weather tyres with a white line in the central groove to differentiate it from the softer wet weather tyre compound.
- No competing team was allowed to carry out more than 30,000 km (18,641 mi) of testing during the 2008 calendar year.

=== Qualifying ===
- The first part of qualifying was lengthened to 20 minutes, and the final part of qualifying shortened to 10 minutes. Teams taking part in Q3 would no longer be allowed to add fuel back to the car after qualifying: a change which was made in order to eliminate the 'fuel-burn' phase.
- A minimum lap time for each qualifying session was implemented from Round 3 in Bahrain in order to stop cars coasting back to the pits at dangerously low speeds, such as that seen in Round 2 in Malaysia. Both Lewis Hamilton and Heikki Kovalainen were demoted five grid places after the stewards decided that they had impeded Nick Heidfeld and Fernando Alonso. The minimum lap time was different for each race. For example, it was 1:39 in Bahrain.
- From 8 May 2008, the FIA announced that, following Super Aguri's departure from Formula One, the qualifying procedures changed. Rather than six drivers being eliminated at the end of Q1, only the five lowest-qualified drivers would be eliminated. This increased the likelihood that one of the midfield contenders would drop out, as only the top 15 drivers would go through to Q2. At the end of Q2 five rather than six cars would be eliminated as well.

== Pre-season testing ==
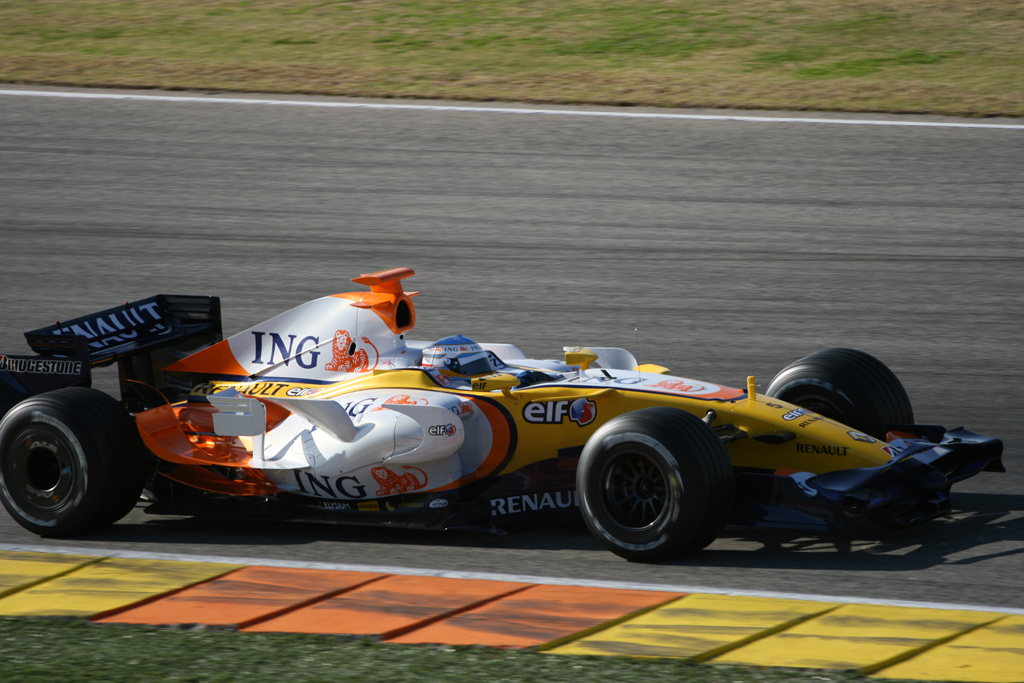
Former double World Champion Fernando Alonso tests the Renault R28 at Valencia.

The first multi-team test session started in Jerez on 14 January 2008. Ferrari, McLaren and Toyota all tested their 2008 cars. Williams tested a modified version of the FW29 whilst Renault and Red Bull tested their 2007 entries. Honda, Toro Rosso, Super Aguri and Force India also attended. BMW Sauber was not in attendance as they were launching the F1.08. Testing then moved to Valencia on 22 January. Renault and Williams were the only teams on the track for the first day of testing. They were both testing their 2008 challengers. They were joined by every other team except Super Aguri for the next three days. 1 February saw testing move to Barcelona. Again, all teams but Super Aguri were in action. The first day of testing saw Kazuki Nakajima crash his FW30. It also saw racist abuse directed at Lewis Hamilton. Williams withdrew from testing on day three to try to fix the problem that caused Nakajima's crash. Meanwhile, on 4 February, Ferrari and Toyota moved to Bahrain to continue testing the F2008 and TF108.

On 12 February testing returned to Jerez. Red Bull and Williams were the only teams in action on the first day. The second day of testing saw all teams but Ferrari and Toyota (who were still in Bahrain) attending. After postponing their SA08 launch and cancelling testing at Valencia, Super Aguri turned up to test their SA07B interim car for the first time.

Testing moved to Barcelona on 19 February. The first day of tests got underway in rain with Williams, Red Bull, Renault and Toyota present. Nico Rosberg topped the time sheets for Williams. BMW were instead testing on their own in Jerez. Super Aguri did not turn up despite promising a Q&A with the media. They blamed circumstances beyond their control. On the second day Ferrari turned up and topped the time sheets with Felipe Massa on another wet track. McLaren joined on the final day and Williams finished on top with Nakajima. The final multi-team test began on 25 February with every team but Super Aguri attending. Lewis Hamilton topped the time sheets faster than both Kimi Räikkönen and Michael Schumacher. McLaren continued to outpace Ferrari on day two with both drivers on top and Toyota were fastest with Jarno Trulli on the final day.

== Report ==
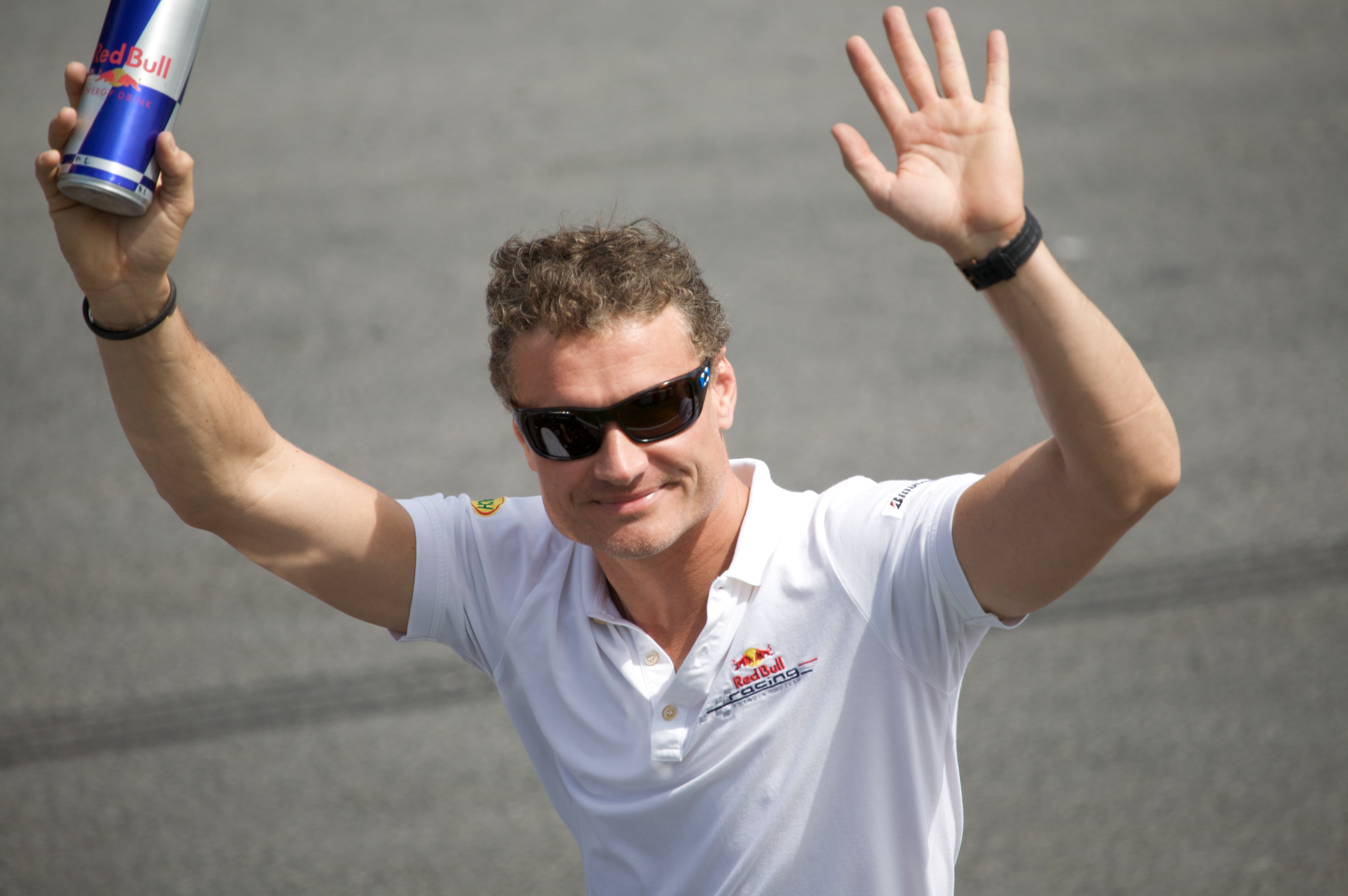
David Coulthard retired from Formula One at the end of season after 14 seasons.

Hamilton took pole and his fifth career victory at the first race in Australia. BMW Sauber's Nick Heidfeld finished second while Williams's Nico Rosberg sealed his first podium finish. The race saw only seven drivers finish the race, reduced to six after Honda's Rubens Barrichello was disqualified for exiting the pits under a red light. Despite an engine problem, Toro Rosso debutant Sébastien Bourdais completed over 90% of the race distance, earning him points in seventh.

A grid penalty for impeding drivers and a pit stop mishap left Hamilton in fifth place at Malaysia, while Räikkönen took his 16th career victory after he qualified in second position. BMW Sauber's Robert Kubica finished second for the first time with McLaren's Heikki Kovalainen third.

Hamilton qualified third at Bahrain despite a crash, with Kubica taking his first pole position. Massa won the race with teammate Räikkönen in second. Kubica made it onto the podium, while Hamilton had a bad race, finishing 13th. He was back in the points at Barcelona, while Räikkönen took Ferrari's third consecutive victory, Massa making it another 1–2.

Massa took pole and won for the third successive Istanbul race, Hamilton splitting the Ferraris on the podium. At Monaco, Ferrari locked out the front row with Massa on pole, but on a bad day for Ferrari, with Räikkönen ruining what could have been Sutil's chance to score, Hamilton won the race despite a mid-race barrier scrape causing him a puncture. Kubica finished second and Massa was third.

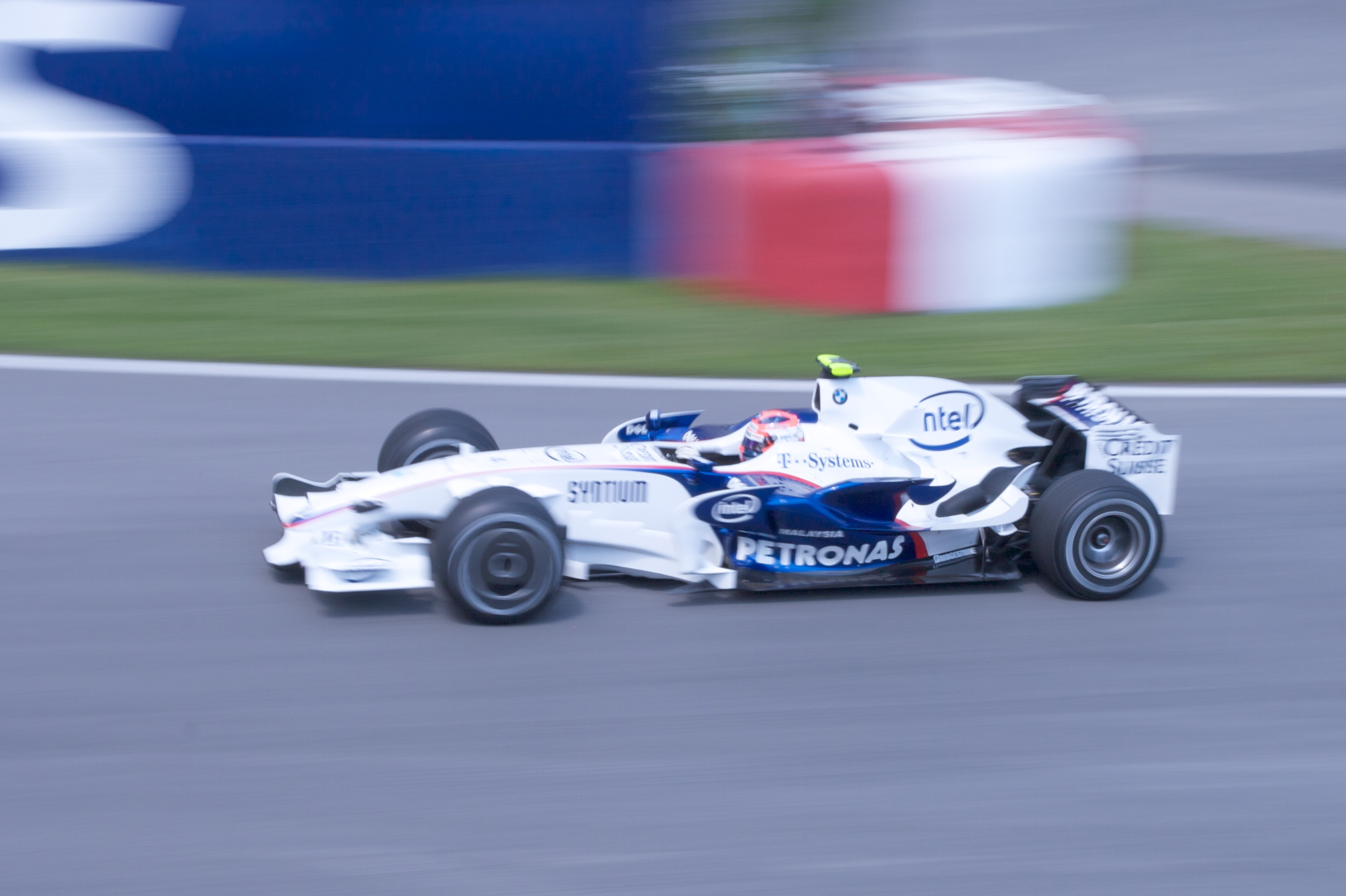
Robert Kubica won his first ever Grand Prix at Montreal.

Hamilton was on pole position at Montreal for the first time since the beginning of the season, a drought of five races, however a pit lane mishap involving himself and Räikkönen eliminated both drivers from the race. Kubica (who also got caught up in the mess but made it through safely) won for the first time with teammate Heidfeld second. Räikkönen started the French Grand Prix on pole, but exhaust problems allowed teammate Massa to get the better of him, and he took his third season victory. Hamilton won back-to-back at Silverstone and Hockenheim. Kovalainen took advantage of Massa's engine failure to take his first career victory at Hungary.

The new Valencia Street Circuit was the new host of the European Grand Prix, Massa taking pole and winning with Hamilton second. At Belgium, Hamilton qualified on pole and finished in first, though he received a 25-second penalty for gaining an advantage during a scrap with Räikkönen. Massa was the classified winner.

Toro Rosso driver Sebastian Vettel became the youngest ever pole man and victor after a stunning weekend at Monza. The race saw a downfall for the big teams, Kovalainen doing a good job for second.

Singapore hosted its first ever F1 race and F1's first ever night race, taking place at the Marina Bay Street Circuit. Massa qualified on pole; however, the race became a major blow to his championship. On lap 12, while Massa was leading, Renault driver Nelson Piquet Jr. deliberately crashed (see 'Race-fixing controversy' below), assisting teammate Fernando Alonso, who went on to win, despite a fuel feed problem in Q2 that had left him 15th on the grid, though he still out-qualified Piquet Jr. Piquet revealed this after he was dropped from the team after the 2009 Hungarian Grand Prix. Rosberg finished on the podium for the second and last time in 2008. Massa was leading ahead of Hamilton, however, when he pitted under the safety car his fuel hose remained attached meaning that the pit crew had to run down the pit lane to detach it. This ruined Massa's race putting him in last position while Hamilton gained 6 points for 3rd place.

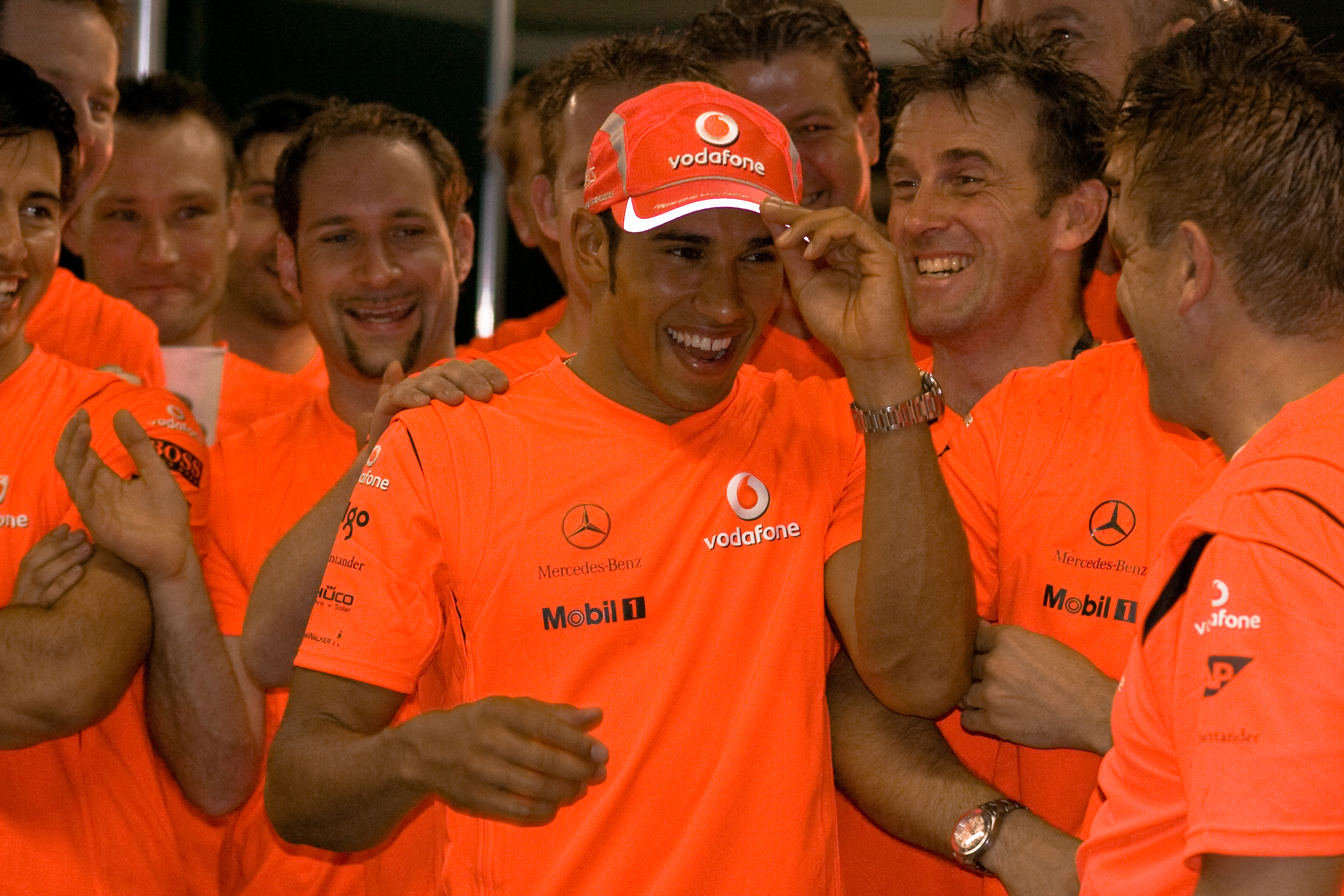
Lewis Hamilton celebrates after winning the championship in Brazil.

Alonso won again in Japan with Kubica second. Hamilton started the race on pole, however he was given a drive through penalty for running wide at the start and shortly afterwards was knocked into a spin by Felipe Massa. He was back to winning ways for the first time since Hockenheim, though, victorious at Shanghai.

At this point, Hamilton had a seven-point lead over Massa, meaning if Massa was to be the victor at his home race in Brazil, Hamilton would need to finish lower than fifth. Hamilton was holding this position though being stalked by Vettel, who eventually passed him on lap 69, as Massa won to momentarily take the title. Hamilton eventually regained fifth place, however, by passing Glock, who was struggling on dry tyres, and finished fifth to take the title by one point from Massa.

=== Race-fixing controversy ===
In a scandal that became known as "Crashgate" in the media, during the 2009 season around the time of the Belgium Grand Prix, allegations by former Renault driver Nelson Piquet Jr. about his crash in the 2008 Singapore Grand Prix led to charges of race-fixing against Renault, and the departure of team boss Flavio Briatore and engineering director Pat Symonds.

== Legal action over title outcome ==
In March 2023, in an interview with German website F1-Insider, former Formula One Group chief executive Bernie Ecclestone was quoted saying that both he and then-FIA president Max Mosley were made aware of Renault's deliberate manipulation of the Singapore Grand Prix "during the 2008 season". He added: "We had enough information in time to investigate the matter. According to the statutes, we should have cancelled the race in Singapore under these conditions. That means it would never have happened for the championship standings. And then Felipe Massa would have become world champion and not Lewis Hamilton." Despite this, Ecclestone said they decided not to act before the championship results were finalised at the end-of-year FIA Prize Giving Ceremony in order to "protect the sport and save it from a huge scandal". Following Ecclestone's comments, Massa reportedly started investigating whether he could take legal action to challenge the outcome of the 2008 championship. In August, Massa and his legal team sent a Letter Before Claim to the FIA and FOM. Later that year, former FIA president Jean Todt agreed in an interview that the Singapore results should have been annulled, saying: "There is no doubt that the Singapore Grand Prix was rigged and should have been canceled."

In March 2024, Massa filed a lawsuit against Formula One, the FIA and Bernie Ecclestone in the London High Court. He is seeking in excess of $80 million in damages and a declaration from the FIA that he would have won the championship had the governing body not breached its regulations.

== Results and standings ==
=== Grands Prix ===
Round	Grand Prix	Pole position	Fastest lap	Winning driver	Winning constructor	Report
1	(Australia) Australian Grand Prix	(United Kingdom) Lewis Hamilton	(Finland) Heikki Kovalainen	(United Kingdom) Lewis Hamilton	(United Kingdom) McLaren-Mercedes	Report
2	(Malaysia) Malaysian Grand Prix	(Brazil) Felipe Massa	(Germany) Nick Heidfeld	(Finland) Kimi Räikkönen	(Italy) Ferrari	Report
3	Bahrain Grand Prix	(Poland) Robert Kubica	(Finland) Heikki Kovalainen	(Brazil) Felipe Massa	(Italy) Ferrari	Report
4	(Spain) Spanish Grand Prix	(Finland) Kimi Räikkönen	(Finland) Kimi Räikkönen	(Finland) Kimi Räikkönen	(Italy) Ferrari	Report
5	(Turkey) Turkish Grand Prix	(Brazil) Felipe Massa	(Finland) Kimi Räikkönen	(Brazil) Felipe Massa	(Italy) Ferrari	Report
6	Monaco Grand Prix	(Brazil) Felipe Massa	(Finland) Kimi Räikkönen	(United Kingdom) Lewis Hamilton	(United Kingdom) McLaren-Mercedes	Report
7	(Canada) Canadian Grand Prix	(United Kingdom) Lewis Hamilton	(Finland) Kimi Räikkönen	(Poland) Robert Kubica	(Germany) BMW Sauber	Report
8	(France) French Grand Prix	(Finland) Kimi Räikkönen	(Finland) Kimi Räikkönen	(Brazil) Felipe Massa	(Italy) Ferrari	Report
9	(United Kingdom) British Grand Prix	(Finland) Heikki Kovalainen	(Finland) Kimi Räikkönen	(United Kingdom) Lewis Hamilton	(United Kingdom) McLaren-Mercedes	Report
10	(Germany) German Grand Prix	(United Kingdom) Lewis Hamilton	(Germany) Nick Heidfeld	(United Kingdom) Lewis Hamilton	(United Kingdom) McLaren-Mercedes	Report
11	(Hungary) Hungarian Grand Prix	(United Kingdom) Lewis Hamilton	(Finland) Kimi Räikkönen	(Finland) Heikki Kovalainen	(United Kingdom) McLaren-Mercedes	Report
12	(Spain) European Grand Prix	(Brazil) Felipe Massa	(Brazil) Felipe Massa	(Brazil) Felipe Massa	(Italy) Ferrari	Report
13	(Belgium) Belgian Grand Prix	(United Kingdom) Lewis Hamilton	(Finland) Kimi Räikkönen	(Brazil) Felipe Massa	(Italy) Ferrari	Report
14	(Italy) Italian Grand Prix	(Germany) Sebastian Vettel	(Finland) Kimi Räikkönen	(Germany) Sebastian Vettel	(Italy) Toro Rosso-Ferrari	Report
15	Singapore Grand Prix	(Brazil) Felipe Massa	(Finland) Kimi Räikkönen	(Spain) Fernando Alonso	(France) Renault	Report
16	(Japan) Japanese Grand Prix	(United Kingdom) Lewis Hamilton	(Brazil) Felipe Massa	(Spain) Fernando Alonso	(France) Renault	Report
17	(China) Chinese Grand Prix	(United Kingdom) Lewis Hamilton	(United Kingdom) Lewis Hamilton	(United Kingdom) Lewis Hamilton	(United Kingdom) McLaren-Mercedes	Report
18	(Brazil) Brazilian Grand Prix	(Brazil) Felipe Massa	(Brazil) Felipe Massa	(Brazil) Felipe Massa	(Italy) Ferrari	Report

=== Scoring system ===
Points are awarded to drivers and constructors as follows:

Position	1st	2nd	3rd	4th	5th	6th	7th	8th
Points	10	8	6	5	4	3	2	1

=== World Drivers' Championship standings ===
Pos.	Driver	AUS (Australia)	MAL (Malaysia)	BHR (Bahrain)	ESP (Spain)	TUR (Turkey)	MON (Monaco)	CAN (Canada)	FRA (France)	GBR (United Kingdom)	GER (Germany)	HUN (Hungary)	EUR (Spain)	BEL (Belgium)	ITA (Italy)	SIN (Singapore)	JPN (Japan)	CHN (China)	BRA (Brazil)	Points
1	(United Kingdom) Lewis Hamilton	1^{P}	5	13	3	2	1	Ret^{P}	10	1	1^{P}	5^{P}	2	3^{P}	7	3	12^{P}	1^{P}^{F}	5	98
2	(Brazil) Felipe Massa	Ret	Ret^{P}	1	2	1^{P}	3^{P}	5	1	13	3	17^{†}	1^{P}^{F}	1	6	13^{P}	7^{F}	2	1^{P}^{F}	97
3	(Finland) Kimi Räikkönen	8^{†}	1	2	1^{P}^{F}	3^{F}	9^{F}	Ret^{F}	2^{P}^{F}	4^{F}	6	3^{F}	Ret	18^{F}^{†}	9^{F}	15^{F}^{†}	3	3	3	75
4	(Poland) Robert Kubica	Ret	2	3^{P}	4	4	2	1	5	Ret	7	8	3	6	3	11	2	6	11	75
5	(Spain) Fernando Alonso	4	8	10	Ret	6	10	Ret	8	6	11	4	Ret	4	4	1	1	4	2	61
6	(Germany) Nick Heidfeld	2	6^{F}	4	9	5	14	2	13	2	4^{F}	10	9	2	5	6	9	5	10	60
7	(Finland) Heikki Kovalainen	5^{F}	3	5^{F}	Ret	12	8	9	4	5^{P}	5	1	4	10^{†}	2	10	Ret	Ret	7	53
8	(Germany) Sebastian Vettel	Ret	Ret	Ret	Ret	17	5	8	12	Ret	8	Ret	6	5	1^{P}	5	6	9	4	35
9	(Italy) Jarno Trulli	Ret	4	6	8	10	13	6	3	7	9	7	5	16	13	Ret	5	Ret	8	31
10	(Germany) Timo Glock	Ret	Ret	9	11	13	12	4	11	12	Ret	2	7	9	11	4	Ret	7	6	25
11	(Australia) Mark Webber	Ret	7	7	5	7	4	12	6	10	Ret	9	12	8	8	Ret	8	14	9	21
12	(Brazil) Nelson Piquet Jr.	Ret	11	Ret	Ret	15	Ret	Ret	7	Ret	2	6	11	Ret	10	Ret	4	8	Ret	19
13	(Germany) Nico Rosberg	3	14	8	Ret	8	Ret	10	16	9	10	14	8	12	14	2	11	15	12	17
14	(Brazil) Rubens Barrichello	DSQ	13	11	Ret	14	6	7	14	3	Ret	16	16	Ret	17	Ret	13	11	15	11
15	(Japan) Kazuki Nakajima	6	17	14	7	Ret	7	Ret	15	8	14	13	15	14	12	8	15	12	17	9
16	(United Kingdom) David Coulthard	Ret	9	18	12	9	Ret	3	9	Ret	13	11	17	11	16	7	Ret	10	Ret	8
17	(France) Sébastien Bourdais	7^{†}	Ret	15	Ret	Ret	Ret	13	17	11	12	18	10	7	18	12	10	13	14	4
18	(United Kingdom) Jenson Button	Ret	10	Ret	6	11	11	11	Ret	Ret	17	12	13	15	15	9	14	16	13	3
19	(Italy) Giancarlo Fisichella	Ret	12	12	10	Ret	Ret	Ret	18	Ret	16	15	14	17	Ret	14	Ret	17	18	0
20	(Germany) Adrian Sutil	Ret	Ret	19	Ret	16	Ret	Ret	19	Ret	15	Ret	Ret	13	19	Ret	Ret	Ret	16	0
21	(Japan) Takuma Sato	Ret	16	17	13															0
22	(United Kingdom) Anthony Davidson	Ret	15	16	Ret															0
Pos.	Driver	AUS (Australia)	MAL (Malaysia)	BHR (Bahrain)	ESP (Spain)	TUR (Turkey)	MON (Monaco)	CAN (Canada)	FRA (France)	GBR (United Kingdom)	GER (Germany)	HUN (Hungary)	EUR (Spain)	BEL (Belgium)	ITA (Italy)	SIN (Singapore)	JPN (Japan)	CHN (China)	BRA (Brazil)	Points

Key
Colour	Result
Gold	Winner
Silver	Second place
Bronze	Third place
Green	Other points position
Blue	Other classified position
Blue	Not classified, finished (NC)
Purple	Not classified, retired (Ret)
Red	Did not qualify (DNQ)
Black	Disqualified (DSQ)
White	Did not start (DNS)
White	Race cancelled (C)
Blank	Did not practice (DNP)
Blank	Excluded (EX)
Blank	Did not arrive (DNA)
Blank	Withdrawn (WD)
Blank	Did not enter (empty cell)
Annotation	Meaning
P	Pole position
F	Fastest lap

Notes:

- † – Drivers did not finish the Grand Prix, but were classified as they completed more than 90% of the race distance.

=== World Constructors' Championship standings ===
Pos.	Constructor	No.	AUS (Australia)	MAL (Malaysia)	BHR (Bahrain)	ESP (Spain)	TUR (Turkey)	MON (Monaco)	CAN (Canada)	FRA (France)	GBR (United Kingdom)	GER (Germany)	HUN (Hungary)	EUR (Spain)	BEL (Belgium)	ITA (Italy)	SIN (Singapore)	JPN (Japan)	CHN (China)	BRA (Brazil)	Points
1	(Italy) Ferrari	1	8^{†}	1	2	1^{P}^{F}	3^{F}	9^{F}	Ret^{F}	2^{P}^{F}	4^{F}	6	3^{F}	Ret	18^{F}^{†}	9^{F}	15^{F}^{†}	3	3	3	172
1	(Italy) Ferrari	2	Ret	Ret^{P}	1	2	1^{P}	3^{P}	5	1	13	3	17^{†}	1^{P}^{F}	1	6	13^{P}	7^{F}	2	1^{P}^{F}	172
2	(United Kingdom) McLaren-Mercedes	22	1^{P}	5	13	3	2	1	Ret^{P}	10	1	1^{P}	5^{P}	2	3^{P}	7	3	12^{P}	1^{P}^{F}	5	151
2	(United Kingdom) McLaren-Mercedes	23	5^{F}	3	5^{F}	Ret	12	8	9	4	5^{P}	5	1	4	10	2	10	Ret	Ret	7	151
3	(Germany) BMW Sauber	3	2	6^{F}	4	9	5	14	2	13	2	4^{F}	10	9	2	5	6	9	5	10	135
3	(Germany) BMW Sauber	4	Ret	2	3^{P}	4	4	2	1	5	Ret	7	8	3	6	3	11	2	6	11	135
4	(France) Renault	5	4	8	10	Ret	6	10	Ret	8	6	11	4	Ret	4	4	1	1	4	2	80
4	(France) Renault	6	Ret	11	Ret	Ret	15	Ret	Ret	7	Ret	2	6	11	Ret	10	Ret	4	8	Ret	80
5	(Japan) Toyota	11	Ret	4	6	8	10	13	6	3	7	9	7	5	16	13	Ret	5	Ret	8	56
5	(Japan) Toyota	12	Ret	Ret	9	11	13	12	4	11	12	Ret	2	7	9	11	4	Ret	7	6	56
6	(Italy) Toro Rosso-Ferrari	14	7^{†}	Ret	15	Ret	Ret	Ret	13	17	11	12	18	10	7	18	12	10	13	14	39
6	(Italy) Toro Rosso-Ferrari	15	Ret	Ret	Ret	Ret	17	5	8	12	Ret	8	Ret	6	5	1^{P}	5	6	9	4	39
7	(Austria) Red Bull-Renault	9	Ret	9	18	12	9	Ret	3	9	Ret	13	11	17	11	16	7	Ret	10	Ret	29
7	(Austria) Red Bull-Renault	10	Ret	7	7	5	7	4	12	6	10	Ret	9	12	8	8	Ret	8	14	9	29
8	(United Kingdom) Williams-Toyota	7	3	14	8	Ret	8	Ret	10	16	9	10	14	8	12	14	2	11	15	12	26
8	(United Kingdom) Williams-Toyota	8	6	17	14	7	Ret	7	Ret	15	8	14	13	15	14	12	8	15	12	17	26
9	(Japan) Honda	16	Ret	10	Ret	6	11	11	11	Ret	Ret	17	12	13	15	15	9	14	16	13	14
9	(Japan) Honda	17	DSQ	13	11	Ret	14	6	7	14	3	Ret	16	16	Ret	17	Ret	13	11	15	14
10	Force India-Ferrari	20	Ret	Ret	19	Ret	16	Ret	Ret	19	Ret	15	Ret	Ret	13	19	Ret	Ret	Ret	16	0
10	Force India-Ferrari	21	Ret	12	12	10	Ret	Ret	Ret	18	Ret	16	15	14	17	Ret	14	Ret	17	18	0
11	(Japan) Super Aguri-Honda	18	Ret	16	17	13															0
11	(Japan) Super Aguri-Honda	19	Ret	15	16	Ret															0
Pos.	Constructor	No.	AUS (Australia)	MAL (Malaysia)	BHR (Bahrain)	ESP (Spain)	TUR (Turkey)	MON (Monaco)	CAN (Canada)	FRA (France)	GBR (United Kingdom)	GER (Germany)	HUN (Hungary)	EUR (Spain)	BEL (Belgium)	ITA (Italy)	SIN (Singapore)	JPN (Japan)	CHN (China)	BRA (Brazil)	Points

Key
Colour	Result
Gold	Winner
Silver	Second place
Bronze	Third place
Green	Other points position
Blue	Other classified position
Blue	Not classified, finished (NC)
Purple	Not classified, retired (Ret)
Red	Did not qualify (DNQ)
Black	Disqualified (DSQ)
White	Did not start (DNS)
White	Race cancelled (C)
Blank	Did not practice (DNP)
Blank	Excluded (EX)
Blank	Did not arrive (DNA)
Blank	Withdrawn (WD)
Blank	Did not enter (empty cell)
Annotation	Meaning
P	Pole position
F	Fastest lap

Notes:

- † – Drivers did not finish the Grand Prix, but were classified as they completed more than 90% of the race distance.
