= 2008 European Grand Prix =

Coordinates: 39°27′32″N 0°19′54″W

Race 12 of 18 in the 2008 Formula One World Championship
← Previous race	Next race →

Race details
- Date: 24 August 2008
- Official name: 2008 Formula 1 Telefónica Grand Prix of Europe
- Location: Valencia Street Circuit, Valencia, Spain
- Course: Street circuit
- Course length: 5.419 km (3.367 miles)
- Distance: 57 laps, 308.883 km (191.931 miles)
- Weather: Sunny

Pole position
Driver	(Brazil) Felipe Massa	Ferrari
- Time: 1:38.989

Fastest lap
Driver	(Brazil) Felipe Massa	Ferrari
- Time: 1:38.708 on lap 36

Podium
First	(Brazil) Felipe Massa	Ferrari
Second	(United Kingdom) Lewis Hamilton	McLaren-Mercedes
Third	(Poland) Robert Kubica	BMW Sauber

The 2008 European Grand Prix (formally the 2008 Formula 1 Telefónica Grand Prix of Europe) was a Formula One motor race held on 24 August 2008 at the Valencia Street Circuit in Valencia, Spain. It was the 12th race of the 2008 Formula One World Championship. Felipe Massa for the Ferrari team won the 57-lap race from pole position. Lewis Hamilton finished second in a McLaren car, with Robert Kubica third in a BMW Sauber.

Massa started on pole position, with Hamilton second, and Kubica third. Massa got cleanly away, while Hamilton fought hard to fend off Kubica, but managing to keep second. The top three remained the same through the first round of pit stops, and after the first stop, Massa took a large lead over Hamilton. In Massa's second pit stop he was released straight into the path of Force India driver Adrian Sutil, and had to back off to avoid a collision. The stewards announced that they would investigate the incident after the race. They later ruled that Ferrari would be fined €10,000 for the pit lane incident, but that Massa would keep his victory, as although the release was unsafe, no sporting advantage had been gained. Massa went on to take the victory, with Hamilton second and Kubica third. Hamilton's closest rival in the Drivers' Championship going into the race, Kimi Räikkönen, failed to finish, after having an engine failure.

Massa's victory in the race enabled him to overtake his teammate, Räikkönen, in the Drivers' Championship, moving him into second. He was now Hamilton's closest rival, behind by six points. Räikkönen moved eight points further behind Hamilton, due to his non-finish, with a deficit of 13 points now separating the two. In the Constructors' Championship McLaren caught up two points on Ferrari; Ferrari led, eight points ahead of McLaren, with BMW Sauber a further 17 points behind.

== Report ==
=== Background ===
The Grand Prix was contested by 20 drivers, in ten teams of two. The teams, also known as "constructors", were Ferrari, McLaren-Mercedes, Renault, Honda, Force India, BMW Sauber, Toyota, Red Bull Racing, Williams and Toro Rosso. Tyre supplier Bridgestone brought two different tyre compounds to the race; the softer of the two marked by a single white stripe down one of the grooves.

Prior to the race, McLaren driver Lewis Hamilton led the Drivers' Championship with 62 points, and Ferrari driver Kimi Räikkönen was second with 57 points. Behind them in the Drivers' Championship, Felipe Massa was third with 54 points also in a Ferrari, and the two BMW Sauber cars of Robert Kubica and Nick Heidfeld were fourth and fifth, with 49 and 41 points respectively. In the Constructors' Championship, Ferrari were leading with 111 points, 11 points ahead of their rivals McLaren. BMW Sauber were third with 90 points. Toyota were fourth with 35 points, and Renault were fifth with 31 points.

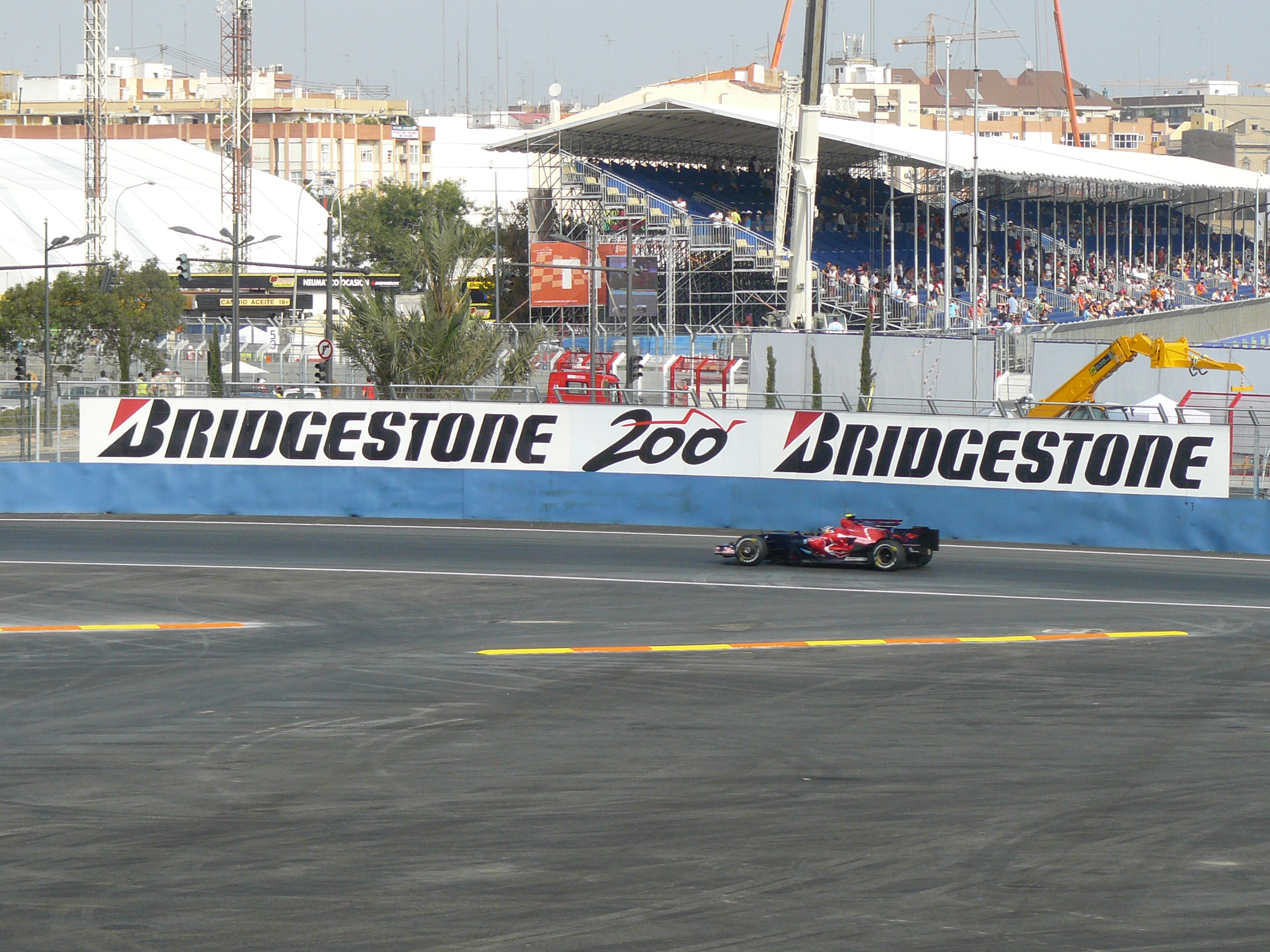
Bridgestone celebrated its 200th Grand Prix since 1997.

The Grand Prix was the first to be held at the new Valencia street circuit. After seeing the track for the first time, four days before the race, the drivers were positive about the track. Formula One tyre supplier, Bridgestone, celebrated their 200th Formula One grand prix at the race, having now supplied Formula One tyres since 1997. Celebrations included a special "golden tyre" which was displayed at the track, as well as two hoardings, inscribed with "Bridgestone 200".

In technical developments, McLaren and Ferrari modified their front winglets, to make sure that the maximum amount of air flow was diverted. Ferrari also revised their sidepod chimneys and winglets, with the aim of making sure the engine remained cool in hot conditions.

=== Practice and qualifying ===
Three practice sessions were held before the Sunday race—two on Friday, and a third on Saturday. The Friday morning and afternoon sessions each lasted 90 minutes. The third session was held on Saturday morning and lasted an hour. The very first practice session on the newly opened Valencia Street Circuit was held on a dusty and slippery track, but despite the drivers' relative unfamiliarity with the circuit there were no major incidents (though David Coulthard did hit the barriers late in the session). Sébastien Bourdais went fastest early on, but it was his Toro Rosso teammate Sebastian Vettel who posted the quickest time of the session. Massa and Hamilton finished second and third, with Bourdais just behind them. Following the session, the drivers and personnel observed a minute's silence for those killed in the plane crash in Madrid two days previously. Kimi Räikkönen topped the timesheets in second practice, having traded fastest times with teammate Massa for the majority of the session. Fernando Alonso had the set the quickest time late, but was surpassed by Räikkönen in his final flying lap. A notable incident in the session involved Nico Rosberg spinning under brakes in the final corners, and narrowly missing Mark Webber on the inside, before rejoining the track with no damage done. Surprsingly, usual back-runner Jenson Button, driving for Honda, finished third. After the session, Fernando Alonso, driving for Renault, was reprimanded and fined €10,000, after crossing the pitlane entry line early on in the second session. Rain overnight meant that the Valencia track began with almost no rubber on the surface, but Robert Kubica was still able to carry enough speed to become the first man of the weekend to break into the 1:38s, with Rosberg and Bourdais close behind. There were minimal mishaps, with only Hamilton and Timo Glock spinning. Jarno Trulli spent the majority of the session in the pits with gearbox problems, completing only two laps.

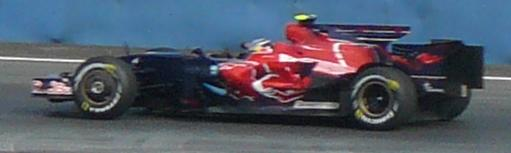
Sebastian Vettel qualified sixth, which at that time was Toro Rosso's best ever qualifying position.

After the third practice, but before the qualifying session, the Fédération Internationale de l'Automobile safety delegate, Charlie Whiting, announced that he had moved the pole position slot on the grid to the right side, after observing the cars' behaviour during the practice sessions. Saturday afternoon's qualifying session was divided into three parts. In the first 20-minute period, cars finishing 16th or lower were eliminated. The second qualifying period lasted for 15 minutes, at the end of which the fastest ten cars went into the final period, to determine their grid positions for the race. Cars failing to make the final period were allowed to be refuelled before the race but those competing in it were not, and so carried more fuel than they had done in the earlier qualifying sessions.

Massa clinched pole position with a time of 1:38.989, and was joined on the front row by championship leader, Hamilton. Kubica took third place on the grid, with Massa's teammate Räikkönen taking fourth. Hamilton's teammate, Kovalainen, took fifth; Vettel, Trulli and Nick Heidfeld occupied the next three spots. The two Williams cars of Nico Rosberg and Kazuki Nakajima finished ninth and 11th, with Bourdais in between. Alonso qualified 12th, with Timo Glock of Toyota behind him. Mark Webber of Red Bull was 14th, with Nelson Piquet Jr. of Renault 15th. Jenson Button of Honda qualified 16th, and the other Red Bull car, driven by Coulthard, qualified 17th. The two Force India cars driven by Giancarlo Fisichella and Adrian Sutil finished 18th and 20th, with the other Honda car driven by Rubens Barrichello qualifying 19th. Later, both Barrichello and Sutil were forced to change their gearboxes; as a result, both drivers started from the pit lane.

=== Race ===
The conditions on the grid were dry before the race. The air temperature was 28 °C (82 °F) and the track temperature was 44 °C (111 °F).

The front-runners of the race started the race cleanly, but at turn four Alonso and Nakajima collided; Alonso retired from, what was in effect, his home race, while Nakajima had a new nose, and rejoined.

At his final stop, Felipe Massa's Ferrari was released from its pit stop into the path of Adrian Sutil's oncoming Force India car. There was no collision as Massa backed off as soon as he realised what had happened. This incident was deemed "unsafe" and was being investigated by the stewards. Shortly afterwards it was announced the incident would be investigated fully after the race. Ferrari was subsequently reprimanded by the stewards and fined €10,000, but the Brazilian kept his victory.

To add to Ferrari's pit stop blunders, Kimi Räikkönen left his pit box with his car's fuel hose still attached. The incident left a Ferrari mechanic Pietro Timpini with a minor fracture. Räikkönen also lost a place.

Nico Rosberg scored a "rare" point for his Williams Team by finishing eighth.

== Classification ==
=== Qualifying ===
Pos	No	Driver	Constructor	Part 1	Part 2	Part 3	Grid
1	2	(Brazil) Felipe Massa	Ferrari	1:38.176	1:37.859	1:38.989	1
2	22	(United Kingdom) Lewis Hamilton	McLaren-Mercedes	1:38.464	1:37.954	1:39.199	2
3	4	(Poland) Robert Kubica	BMW Sauber	1:38.347	1:38.050	1:39.392	3
4	1	(Finland) Kimi Räikkönen	Ferrari	1:38.703	1:38.229	1:39.488	4
5	23	(Finland) Heikki Kovalainen	McLaren-Mercedes	1:38.656	1:38.120	1:39.937	5
6	15	(Germany) Sebastian Vettel	Toro Rosso-Ferrari	1:38.141	1:37.842	1:40.142	6
7	11	(Italy) Jarno Trulli	Toyota	1:37.948	1:37.928	1:40.309	7
8	3	(Germany) Nick Heidfeld	BMW Sauber	1:38.738	1:37.859	1:40.631	8
9	7	(Germany) Nico Rosberg	Williams-Toyota	1:38.595	1:38.336	1:40.721	9
10	14	(France) Sébastien Bourdais	Toro Rosso-Ferrari	1:38.622	1:38.417	1:40.750	10
11	8	(Japan) Kazuki Nakajima	Williams-Toyota	1:38.667	1:38.428		11
12	5	(Spain) Fernando Alonso	Renault	1:38.268	1:38.435		12
13	12	(Germany) Timo Glock	Toyota	1:38.532	1:38.499		13
14	10	(Australia) Mark Webber	Red Bull-Renault	1:38.559	1:38.515		14
15	6	(Brazil) Nelson Piquet Jr.	Renault	1:38.787	1:38.744		15
16	16	(United Kingdom) Jenson Button	Honda	1:38.880			16
17	9	(United Kingdom) David Coulthard	Red Bull-Renault	1:39.235			17
18	21	(Italy) Giancarlo Fisichella	Force India-Ferrari	1:39.268			18
19	17	(Brazil) Rubens Barrichello	Honda	1:39.811			19
20	20	(Germany) Adrian Sutil	Force India-Ferrari	1:39.943			20

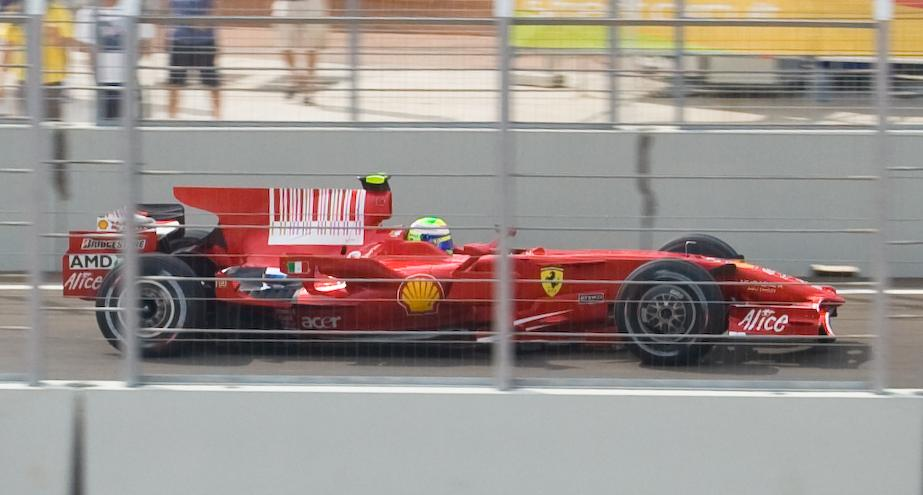
Felipe Massa won the race for Ferrari.

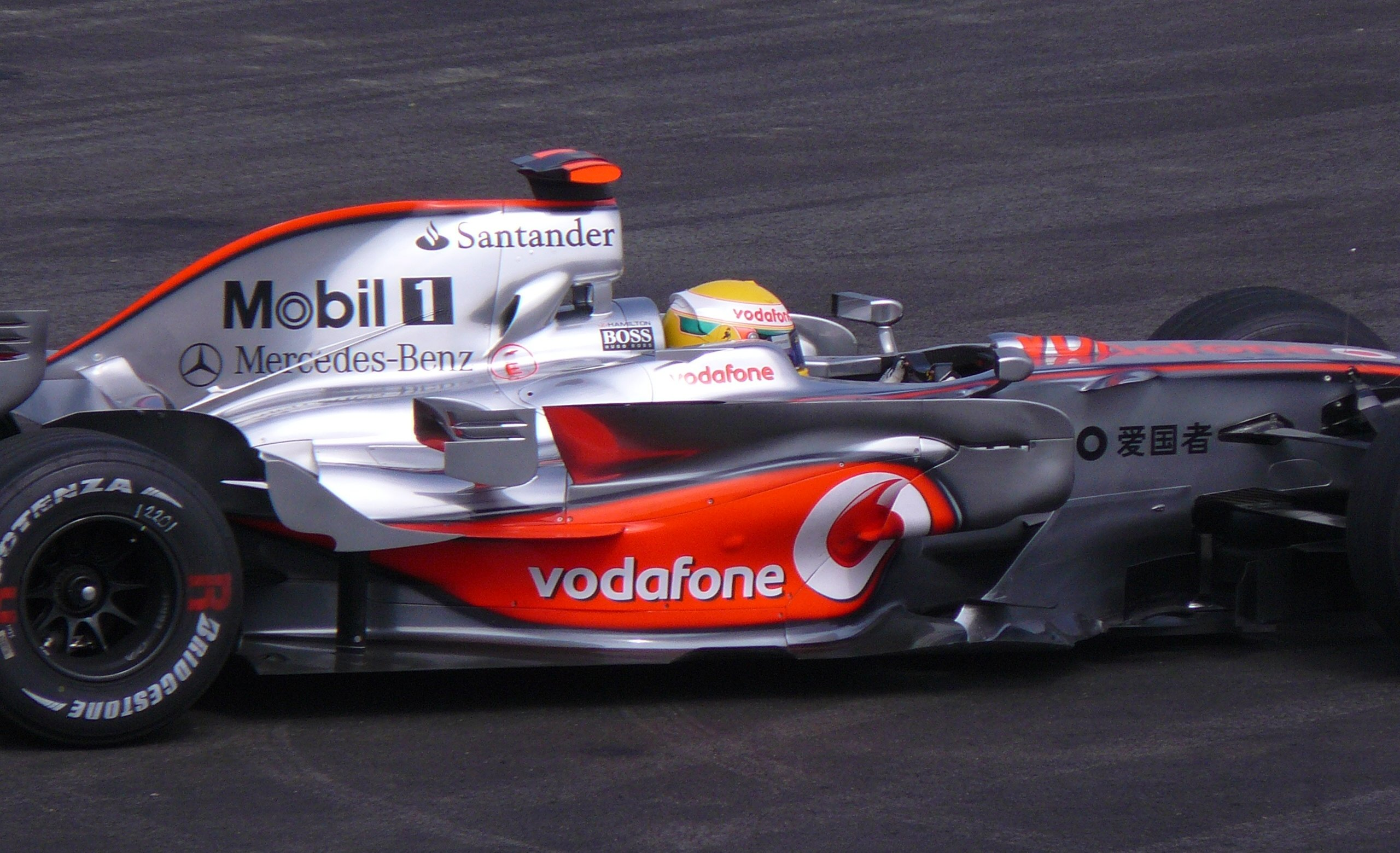
Lewis Hamilton finished second for McLaren.

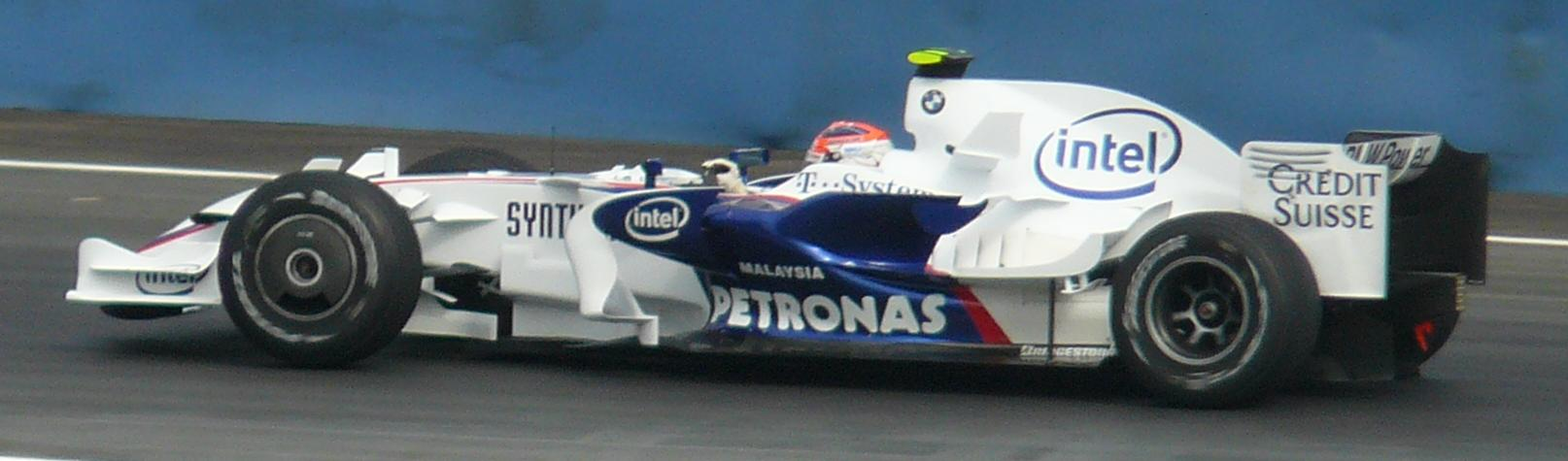
Robert Kubica finished third for BMW Sauber.

=== Race ===
Pos	No	Driver	Constructor	Laps	Time/Retired	Grid	Points
1	2	(Brazil) Felipe Massa	Ferrari	57	1:35:32.339	1	10
2	22	(United Kingdom) Lewis Hamilton	McLaren-Mercedes	57	+5.611	2	8
3	4	(Poland) Robert Kubica	BMW Sauber	57	+37.353	3	6
4	23	(Finland) Heikki Kovalainen	McLaren-Mercedes	57	+39.703	5	5
5	11	(Italy) Jarno Trulli	Toyota	57	+50.684	7	4
6	15	(Germany) Sebastian Vettel	Toro Rosso-Ferrari	57	+52.625	6	3
7	12	(Germany) Timo Glock	Toyota	57	+1:07.990	13	2
8	7	(Germany) Nico Rosberg	Williams-Toyota	57	+1:11.457	9	1
9	3	(Germany) Nick Heidfeld	BMW Sauber	57	+1:22.177	8	
10	14	(France) Sébastien Bourdais	Toro Rosso-Ferrari	57	+1:29.794	10	
11	6	(Brazil) Nelson Piquet Jr.	Renault	57	+1:32.717	15	
12	10	(Australia) Mark Webber	Red Bull-Renault	56	+1 Lap	14	
13	16	(United Kingdom) Jenson Button	Honda	56	+1 Lap	16	
14	21	(Italy) Giancarlo Fisichella	Force India-Ferrari	56	+1 Lap	18	
15	8	(Japan) Kazuki Nakajima	Williams-Toyota	56	+1 Lap	11	
16	17	(Brazil) Rubens Barrichello	Honda	56	+1 Lap	PL^{1}	
17	9	(United Kingdom) David Coulthard	Red Bull-Renault	56	+1 Lap	17	
Ret	1	(Finland) Kimi Räikkönen	Ferrari	45	Engine	4	
Ret	20	(Germany) Adrian Sutil	Force India-Ferrari	41	Accident	PL^{1}	
Ret	5	(Spain) Fernando Alonso	Renault	0	Collision damage	12	

Notes

- ^1 – Rubens Barrichello and Adrian Sutil both made late gearbox changes, and consequently started from the pit lane.

== Championship standings after the race ==
Drivers' Championship standings

	Pos.	Driver	Points
	1	(United Kingdom) Lewis Hamilton	70
1	2	(Brazil) Felipe Massa	64
1	3	(Finland) Kimi Räikkönen	57
	4	(Poland) Robert Kubica	55
1	5	(Finland) Heikki Kovalainen	43

Constructors' Championship standings

Pos.	Constructor	Points
1	(Italy) Ferrari	121
2	(United Kingdom) McLaren-Mercedes	113
3	(Germany) BMW Sauber	96
4	(Japan) Toyota	41
5	(France) Renault	31

- Note: Only the top five positions are included for both sets of standings.

== See also ==
- 2008 Valencia GP2 Series round

Previous race: 2008 Hungarian Grand Prix	FIA Formula One World Championship; 2008 season	Next race: 2008 Belgian Grand Prix
Previous race: 2007 European Grand Prix	European Grand Prix	Next race: 2009 European Grand Prix
