= Williams FW31 =

Formula One Car for 2009 season

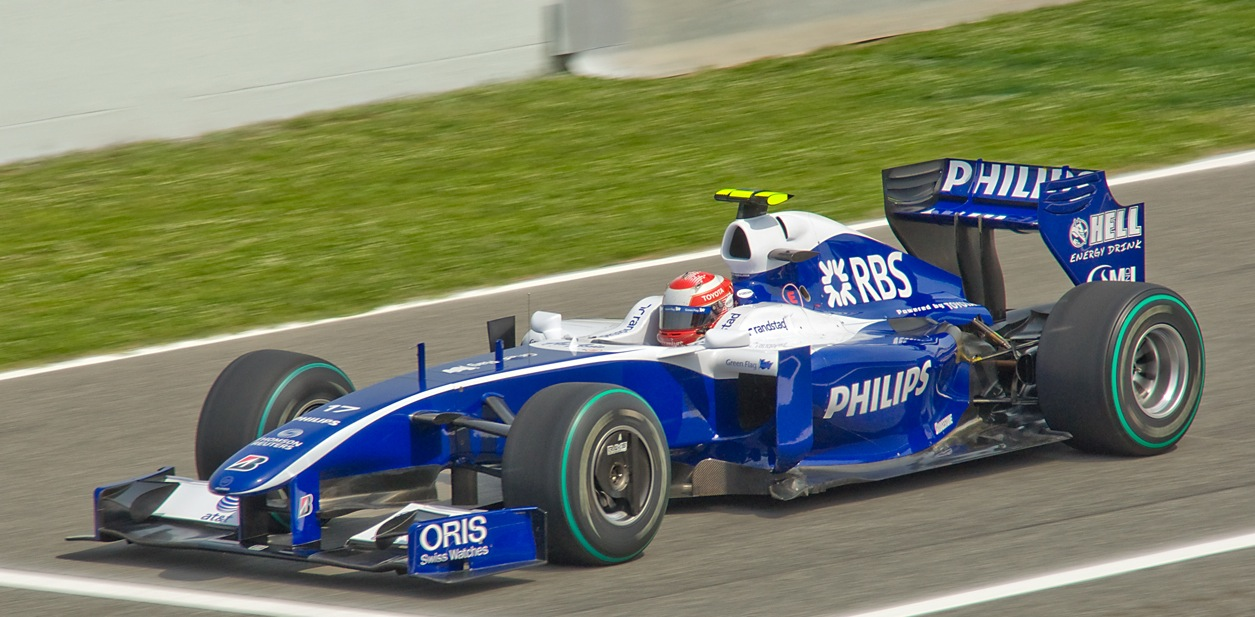
- Kazuki Nakajima driving the FW31 at the Spanish Grand Prix
- Category: Formula One
- Constructor: Williams
- Designers: Sam Michael (Technical Director); Ed Wood (Chief Designer); Clive Cooper (Head of Design - Composites and Structures); Christopher Brawn (Head of Design - Suspension, Steering, Breaks); Mark Loasby (Head of Design - Systems); Jon Tomlinson (Head of Aerodynamics); Enrico Balbo (Double Diffuser, Concept Lead)
- Predecessor: Williams FW30
- Successor: Williams FW32

Technical specifications
- Chassis: Carbon-aramid and honeycomb composite monocoque.
- Suspension (front): Carbon fibre double wishbone, with pushrod activated springs. Zero keel geometry.
- Suspension (rear): Double wishbone, with pushrod activated springs.
- Wheelbase: 3,100 mm (122.0 in)
- Engine: Toyota RVX-09 2.4 L (146 cu in) 90° V8. Limited to 18,000 rpm. naturally-aspirated, longitudinally mid-mounted.
- Transmission: Williams 7-speed electro-hydraulically actuated, semi-automatic, seamless shift.
- Power: 740 hp @ 18,000 rpm
- Weight: 605 kg (1,334 lb) (including driver)
- Fuel: Esso
- Lubricants: Mobil 1
- Tyres: Bridgestone Potenza

Competition history
- Notable entrants: AT&T Williams
- Notable drivers: 16. (Germany) Nico Rosberg; 17. (Japan) Kazuki Nakajima
- Debut: 2009 Australian Grand Prix
- Last event: 2009 Abu Dhabi Grand Prix
Races	Wins	Podiums	Poles	F/Laps
17	0	0	0	1

The Williams FW31 was a Formula One motor racing car, designed and built by Williams F1. The AT&T Williams team used the FW31 to compete in the 2009 Formula One season. The car was unveiled on 19 January 2009 at the Autódromo Internacional do Algarve circuit in southern Portugal, and was first driven by the team's test driver Nico Hülkenberg. It was a mid-field runner, in contention for points on many occasions when driven by Rosberg, but rarely contending for podiums. Rosberg could have finished in third position at Marina Bay during the Singapore Grand Prix if he had not run wide on the exit of the pit lane and received a penalty.

Rosberg was criticised for failing to achieve a pole position while topping the times in practices on numerous occasions, notably at the Brazilian Grand Prix - the Williams cars had excelled during practice sessions in wet conditions, but did not produce the same level of performance in qualifying. While Rosberg often scored points, and elevated the car to a finishing position that it was considered incapable of, Nakajima failed to score a point all season and possibly cost the team a higher position in the championship standings than the seventh place they eventually achieved.

The Williams FW31 was the first British F1 car to use Esso-branded fuel since 1973, as well as the first Williams F1 car to use Mobil 1 lubricants since 1988 season, as they had been using ExxonMobil brands since 1999.

== Diffuser controversy ==
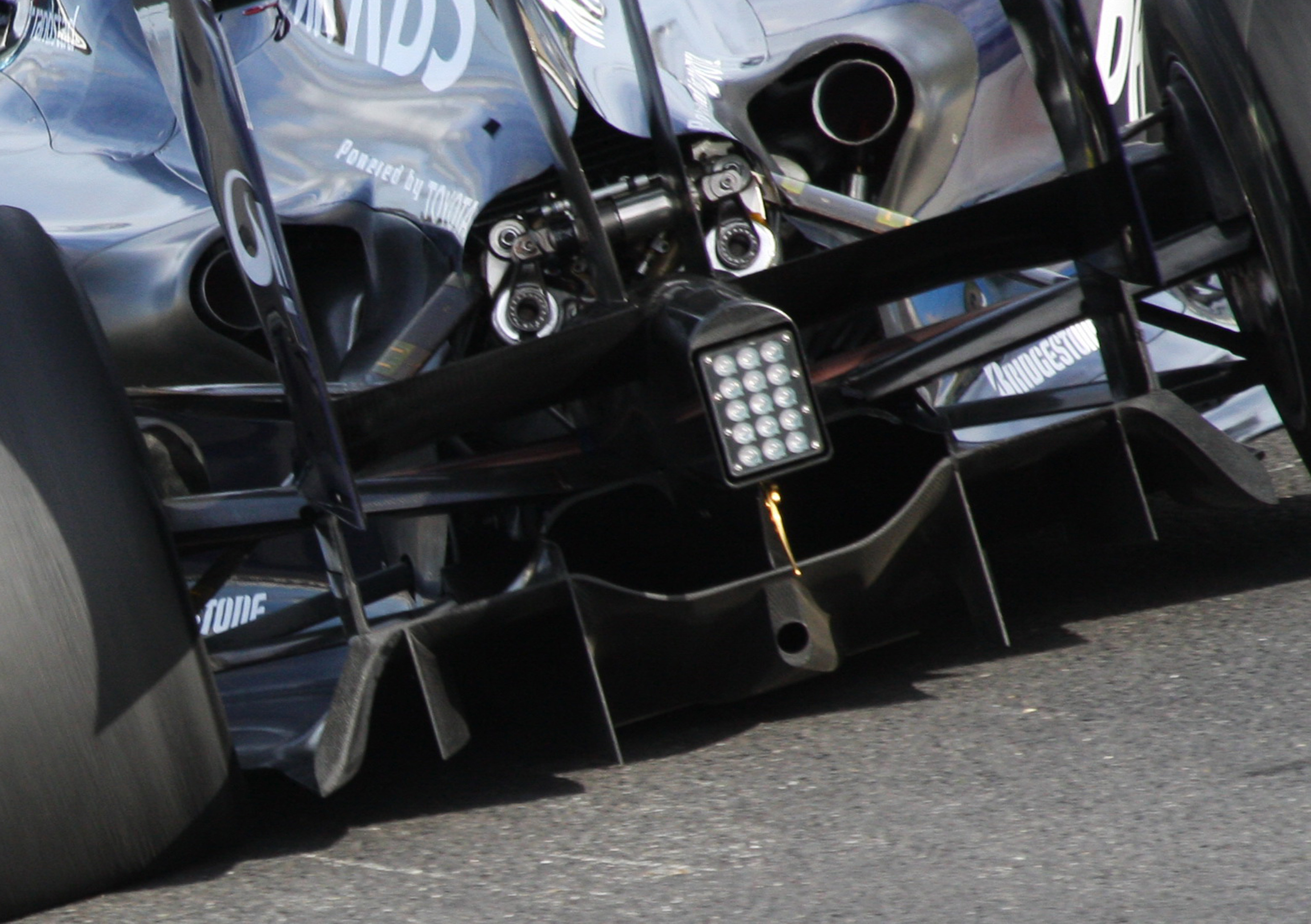
The design of the FW31's diffuser caused controversy when the chassis was launched, but was later cleared by the FIA.

At the first race of the season, an official complaint was launched by other teams against the rear diffusers of the Williams FW31, Toyota TF109 and the Brawn BGP 001 saying that they were illegal, but after analysing the cars, the FIA reported that the cars were not illegal. The teams appealed and after much deliberating the car were deemed legal by the FIA.

== Season review ==
The Williams FW31 was a slight improvement compared to previous FW28-30 cars as the team tried to get used to the major new rules in 2009. Rosberg proved to be a consistent challenger for points, though he could not clinch a podium finish.

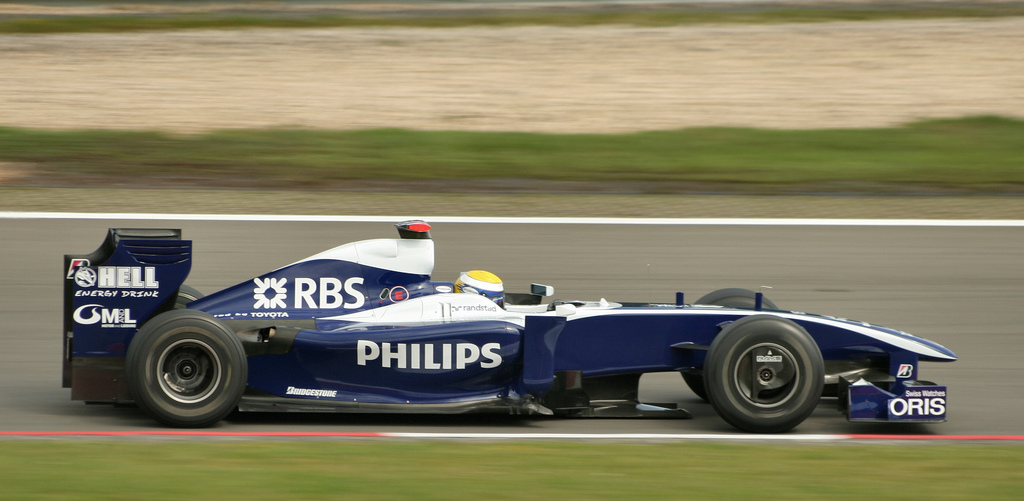
Rosberg (pictured during his home race in Germany), became the team's lone scorer of the season, with the best finish of fourth in the German and Hungarian Grands Prix.

It could have been a second consecutive podium finish in Singapore for Rosberg, who was running third before a pit-stop. After the pit-stop, his car ran wide, causing a drive through penalty. The safety car was sent out on track, and he could not serve his penalty until the safety car was called in, ending his chances of a podium finish.

== Sponsorship and livery ==
The FW31 is predominantly painted in white and blue. AirAsia, AT&T, Bridgestone, Philips, Randstad, RBS, and Oris advertise on the vehicle.

Starting from the Spanish Grand Prix, the team signed a two-year sponsorship deal with energy drink Hell Energy Drink, making Hell Energy the second energy drink to enter the world of Formula One racing.

== Formula One World Championship results ==
(key) (results in bold indicate pole position; results in italics indicate fastest lap)

Year	Entrant	Engine	Tyres	Drivers	1	2	3	4	5	6	7	8	9	10	11	12	13	14	15	16	17	Points	WCC
2009	AT&T Williams	Toyota RVX-09 V8	**B**		AUS	MAL^{‡}	CHN	BHR	ESP	MON	TUR	GBR	GER	HUN	EUR	BEL	ITA	SIN	JPN	BRA	ABU	34.5	7th
2009	AT&T Williams	Toyota RVX-09 V8	**B**	Rosberg	6	8	15	9	8	6	5	5	4	4	5	8	16	11	5	Ret	9	34.5	7th
2009	AT&T Williams	Toyota RVX-09 V8	**B**	Nakajima	Ret	12	Ret	Ret	13	15^{†}	12	11	12	9	18^{†}	13	10	9	15	Ret	13	34.5	7th

^{†} Driver failed to finish, but was classified as they had completed >90% of the race distance.
^{‡} Half points awarded as less than 75% of race distance completed.

== Sponsors ==
Brand	Country	Placed on
RBS	United Kingdom	Nose, fin, sidepods
Lenovo	China	Rear wing
Petrobras	Brazil	Mirrors, nosecone, sidepods
Reuters	United Kingdom	Cockpit side
Hamleys	United Kingdom	Sidepods
Oris	Switzerland	Front wing end plate
Toyota	Japan	Side
Philips	Netherlands	Nose
AT&T	United States	Fin, front wing
House of Fraser	United Kingdom	Nose
AllSaints	United Kingdom	Rear wing end plate
