= Williams FW29 =

Formula One car

Williams-Toyota FW29
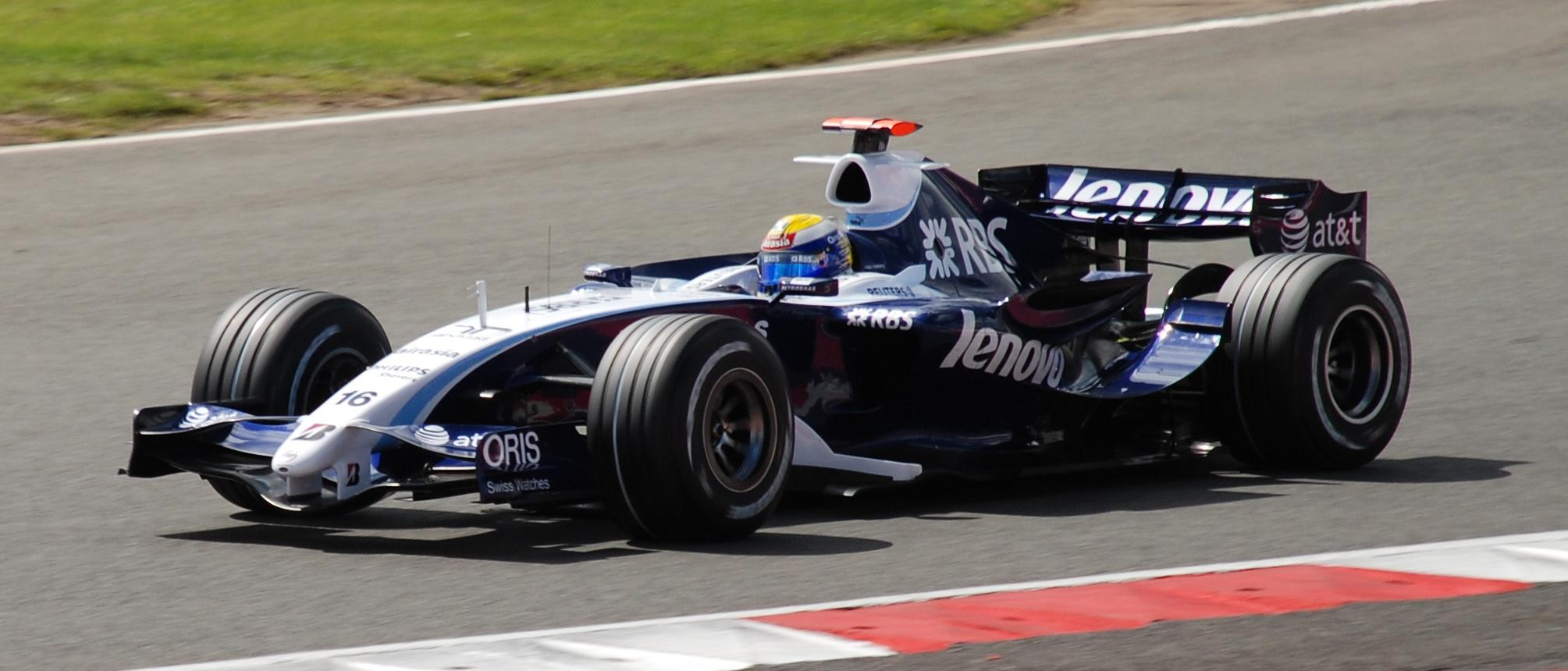
- Nico Rosberg driving the FW29 at the 2007 British Grand Prix
- Category: Formula One
- Constructor: Williams
- Designers: Sam Michael (Technical Director); Ed Wood (Chief Designer); Clive Cooper (Head of Design - Composites and Structures); Christopher Brawn (Head of Design - Suspension, Steering, Breaks); Mark Loasby (Head of Design - Systems); Steve Wise (Head of Electronics); Jon Tomlinson (Head of Aerodynamics); Loïc Bigois (Chief Aerodynamicist)
- Predecessor: Williams FW28
- Successor: Williams FW30

Technical specifications
- Chassis: Monocoque construction fabricated from carbon aramid epoxy and honeycomb composite structure, surpassing FIA impact and strength requirements
- Suspension (front): Carbon fibre double wishbone arrangement, with composite toelink and pushrod activated torsion springs
- Suspension (rear): Double wishbone and pushrod activated torsion springs and rockers
- Engine: Toyota RVX-07 2398 cc V8. Naturally aspirated mid-mounted
- Transmission: Williams 7-speed, semi-automatic seamless-shift
- Power: 755 hp @ 19,000 rpm
- Fuel: Petrobras
- Tyres: Bridgestone

Competition history
- Notable entrants: AT&T Williams
- Notable drivers: 16. (Germany) Nico Rosberg; 17. (Austria) Alexander Wurz; 17. (Japan) Kazuki Nakajima
- Debut: 2007 Australian Grand Prix
- Last event: 2007 Brazilian Grand Prix
| Races | Wins | Poles | F/Laps |
|---|---|---|---|
| 17 | 0 | 0 | 0 |
- Constructors' Championships: 0
- Drivers' Championships: 0

The Williams FW29 was a Formula One car, built by the Williams F1 team that competed in the 2007 Formula One season. It was driven by Alexander Wurz and Nico Rosberg. The car had a Toyota engine, making it only the second time in the team's history that a Japanese car manufacturer has supplied their engines; Honda had supplied the team during the period from 1983 to 1987.

== Season performance ==
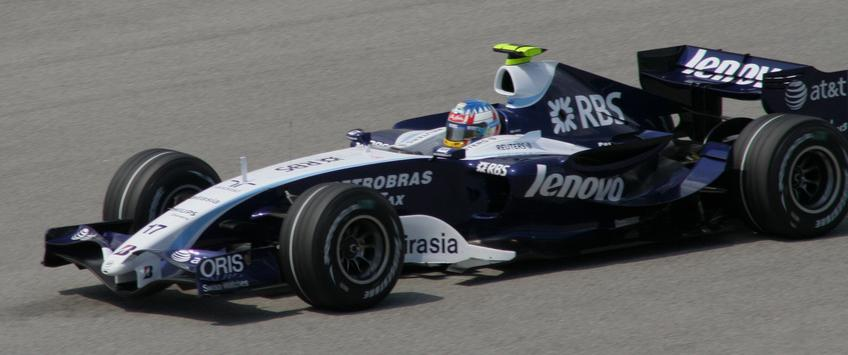
Alexander Wurz driving the FW29 at the 2007 Malaysian Grand Prix.

=== Pre-season testing ===
The FW29 made its debut at the first testing session at Jerez, where Alexander Wurz completed 72 laps in the new Toyota powered car and was second fastest of a sixteen car session, only fractions slower than fastest Pedro de la Rosa of McLaren. "We had two cars on track straight away with Alex and Nico," said Sam Michael, Williams's Technical Director. "Completing 611km in total on the first running day with no issues with temperatures, vibrations etc., is a good start. Motivation within the team is really high and everyone is pushing hard to get the best out of the car before the first Grand Prix. Both drivers started testing different set-up packages before midday as there are some interesting new directions with this car and the Bridgestone Potenza tyres."

== Livery ==
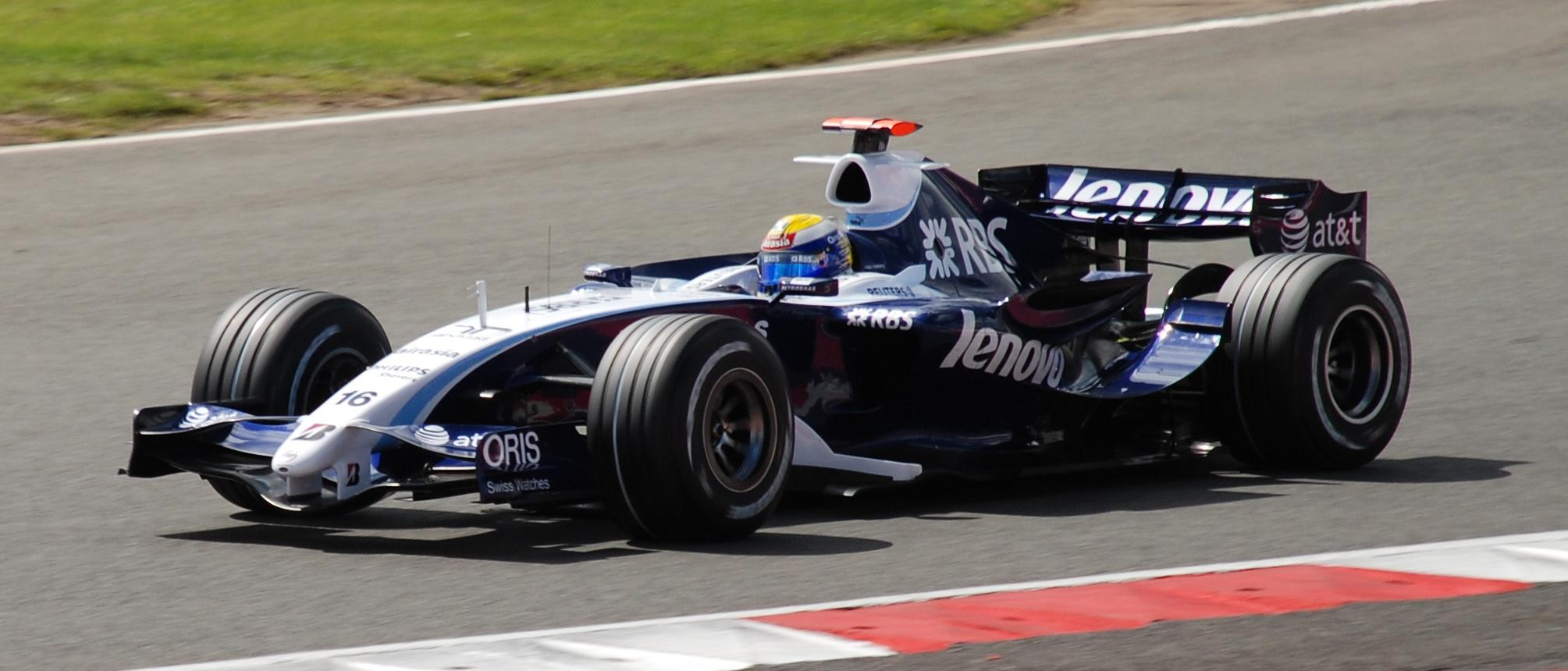
Nico Rosberg driving the FW29 at the 2007 British Grand Prix.

The FW29 continued the blue and white colour scheme set by previous Williams cars with a number of sponsors, such as RBS and Reuters, being retained for the 2007 season along with a number of new sponsors, including the team's new title sponsors AT&T as well as Lenovo, a computer manufacturer from China.

== Chassis ==
The FW29 had a number of changes from the preceding FW28. The suspension was zero keel configuration, which had become industry standard. Other notable elements of the design included another step in the undercut of the sidepod leading edge, with top louvres for cooling. The engine and exhaust underwent improvements to address the reliability issues experienced in 2006 and a lower and narrower top deck for improved aerodynamic efficiency. The other prominent differences from the FW28 included large chimneys expressly for cooling at the season's first three races in Australia; Malaysia and Bahrain, and a narrower engine cover spine.

At the rear of the car, a twin pillar configuration supported a lighter and lower drag rear wing, now featuring FIA-mandatory slot gap separators to prevent deflection and a lower and wider rear impact structure as required by the regulations.

== Season review ==
The Williams FW29 was definitely an improvement over the disastrous Williams FW28, which only scored 11 points and was hugely unreliable. The FW29 proved a consistent challenger for points, but was well off the pace of the front running McLaren and Ferrari cars, and the new BMW Sauber team formed by Williams's old engine partners. Alexander Wurz had a mixed season, achieving an unlikely podium finish at the 2007 Canadian Grand Prix despite suffering a damaged rear wing caused by a collision with Vitantonio Liuzzi but had an unsuccessful second half of the season. However, Rosberg proved to be a faster driver, scoring frequent points finishes and consistently outpacing Wurz, particularly in the 2nd half of the season. Wurz decided to retire from F1 before the final race of the season, with test driver Kazuki Nakajima drafted in as his replacement. The team were classified in 4th place with 33 points, due to McLaren's expulsion from the Championship.

== Williams FW29B ==
Williams appeared with the FW29B at Jerez during the winter testing at in January 2008. The car was fitted with several aerodynamic changes which would be adopted on the FW30. Both Rosberg and Nakajima tested with the car.

== Complete Formula One results ==
(key) (results in bold indicate pole position)

| Year | Team | Engine | Tyres | Drivers | 1 | 2 | 3 | 4 | 5 | 6 | 7 | 8 | 9 | 10 | 11 | 12 | 13 | 14 | 15 | 16 | 17 | Points | WCC |
|---|---|---|---|---|---|---|---|---|---|---|---|---|---|---|---|---|---|---|---|---|---|---|---|
| 2007 | Williams | Toyota V8 | **B** | | AUS | MAL | BHR | ESP | MON | CAN | USA | FRA | GBR | EUR | HUN | TUR | ITA | BEL | JPN | CHN | BRA | **33** | **4th** |
| 2007 | Williams | Toyota V8 | **B** | (Germany) Nico Rosberg | 7 | Ret | 10 | 6 | 12 | 10 | 16^{†} | 9 | 12 | Ret | 7 | 7 | 6 | 6 | Ret | 16 | 4 | **33** | **4th** |
| 2007 | Williams | Toyota V8 | **B** | (Austria) Alexander Wurz | Ret | 9 | 11 | Ret | 7 | 3 | 10 | 14 | 13 | 4 | 14 | 11 | 13 | Ret | Ret | 12 | | **33** | **4th** |
| 2007 | Williams | Toyota V8 | **B** | (Japan) Kazuki Nakajima | TD | TD | | | | TD | TD | | | | | | | | | TD | 10 | **33** | **4th** |

== Sponsors ==
| Brand | Country | Placed on |
|---|---|---|
| RBS | United Kingdom | Nose, fin, sidepods |
| Lenovo | China | Sidepods, rear wing |
| Petrobras | Brazil | Mirrors, nosecone |
| Reuters | United Kingdom | Cockpit side |
| Hamleys | United Kingdom | Rear wing end plate |
| Oris | Switzerland | Front wing end plate |
| Tata | India | Nosecone |
| Toyota | Japan | Side |
| AirAsia | Malaysia | Nose, barge board |
| Philips | Netherlands | Nose |
| AT&T | United States | Rear wing end plate |
