= Williams FW30 =

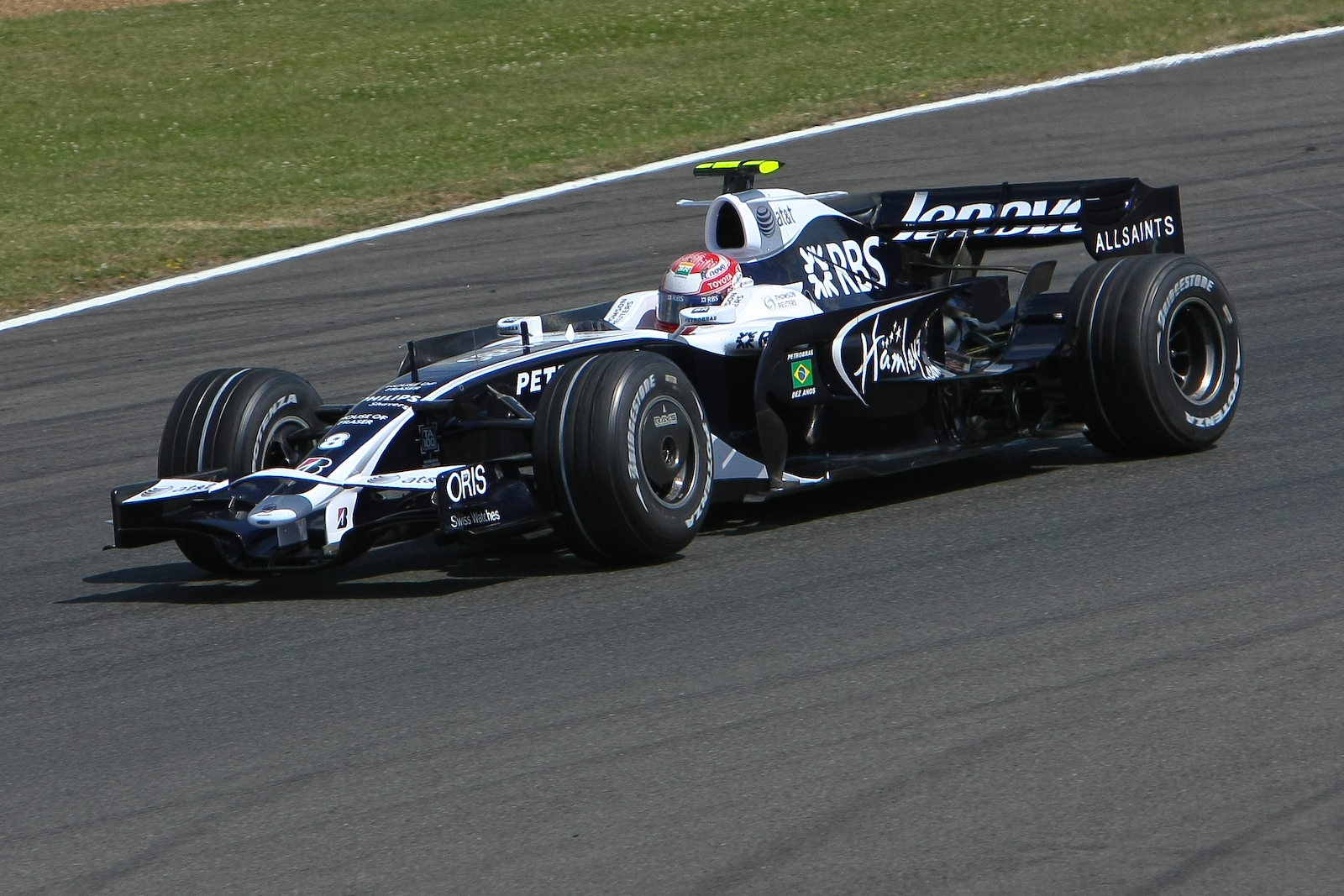
- Kazuki Nakajima driving the FW30 at the 2008 British Grand Prix
- Category: Formula One
- Constructor: Williams
- Designers: Sam Michael (Technical Director); Ed Wood (Chief Designer); Clive Cooper (Head of Design - Composites and Structures); Christopher Brawn (Head of Design - Suspension, Steering, Breaks); Mark Loasby (Head of Design - Systems); Jon Tomlinson (Head of Aerodynamics)
- Predecessor: Williams FW29
- Successor: Williams FW31

Technical specifications
- Chassis: Carbon-aramid and honeycomb composite monocoque.
- Suspension (front): Carbon fibre double wishbone with toelink and pushrod operated torsion springs.
- Suspension (rear): Double wishbone with pushrod and rocker operated torsion springs.
- Wheelbase: 3,100 mm (122.0 in)
- Engine: Toyota RVX-08 2,400 cc (146.5 cu in) 90° V8, naturally aspirated, mid-mounted.
- Transmission: Williams F1 seven-speed, seamless shift, sequential, semi-automatic.
- Power: 750 hp @ 19,000 rpm
- Weight: 605 kg (1,334 lb) (inc. driver and ballast.)
- Fuel: Petrobras
- Tyres: Bridgestone

Competition history
- Notable entrants: AT&T Williams
- Notable drivers: 7. (Germany) Nico Rosberg; 8. (Japan) Kazuki Nakajima
- Debut: 2008 Australian Grand Prix
- Last event: 2008 Brazilian Grand Prix
| Races | Wins | Podiums | Poles | F/Laps |
|---|---|---|---|---|
| 18 | 0 | 2 | 0 | 0 |

The Williams FW30 is a Formula One racing car, designed by Williams for the 2008 Formula One season. The car is largely an evolution of its predecessor, the FW29. As with its predecessor, the FW30 is powered by engines manufactured by Toyota. The FW30 was unveiled to the public on 21 January 2008 at the Circuit de Valencia, Spain, and made its race debut at the Australian Grand Prix and was driven by Nico Rosberg and Kazuki Nakajima.

== Design ==
In comparison to the preceding Williams FW29 car, Williams Technical Director Sam Michael described the aim of the FW30's construction as being "refining our package and weight distribution" rather than being a radical redesign. Although not confirmed by Williams, weight distribution was likely moved forward somewhat, to better utilise the traction characteristics of the single-supply Bridgestone tyres.

=== Chassis and suspension ===
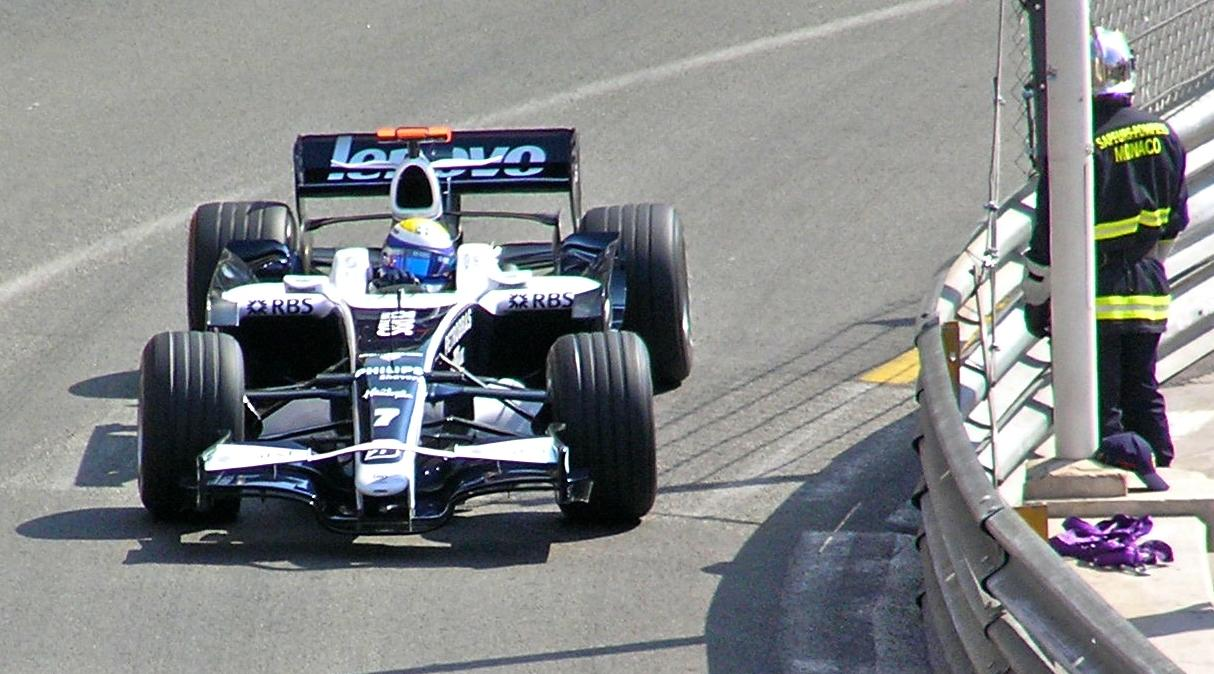
Nico Rosberg driving the FW30 at the 2008 Monaco Grand Prix.

In common with all contemporary Formula One designs, the FW30's basic architecture is built around a carbon fibre, aramid and honeycomb composite material monocoque. The design carries over the FW29's zero keel, double wishbone suspension arrangement, along with the twin-pillar rear wing. The FW30's front wing is one area in which the design of the FW29 was not followed. In place of the older car's two-element wing a three-element design was introduced, similar to that used on the 2007 McLaren MP4-22. As with the McLaren design the Williams wing's upper element features a central section that is raised up and passes over the tip of the car's, slightly lower, nose cone. However, unlike the McLaren, the FW30's front wing is suspended from the nose cone using the forward element.

Around the drivers, in accordance with new FIA regulations, the cockpit sides are significantly raised in comparison to previous years. The exhaust chimneys were altered from the FW29's side-exit design, to a slimmer, vertical-exit one. Other, less obvious, chassis alterations include an increase in the number of cooling louvres in the upper surfaces of the side pods, made in response to a change in the orientation of the main radiators within the pods, and an increase in the backward sweep of the roll bar-mounted mid wing.

==== Aerodynamic development during the 2008 season ====
During the season various additions and modifications were made to the FW30's aerodynamic appendages. The design of the front wing bridge was tweaked slightly from the 2008 Turkish Grand Prix onward. The bridge element gained two small airflow "fences" that allowed the Williams aerodynamic team to extend the depth of the wing profile. This resulted in an increase in the aerodynamic downforce generated by the wing, without a concomitant increase in drag. Later in the season, prior to the 2008 German Grand Prix, Williams also altered the lower front wing elements, offering their drivers a choice of drag-reducing flap tweaks to the rearmost element. The bumps expected at the new Marina Bay Street Circuit, used for the 2008 Singapore Grand Prix, prompted Williams to tweak the design of the front wing yet again. On this occasion the central "spoon profile" was given a more rounded aspect, in place of the rather more squared-off design used to this point. The change in profile reduced downforce slightly, but resulted in the FW30 being significantly less sensitive to the changes in ride height expected as the cars negotiated the bumpy surface. For the final race of the season, the 2008 Brazilian Grand Prix, Williams again tweaked the profile of the main and middle elements of the front wing. Small curved steps were added to the outer extremities of these elements to increase the speed of airflow through the wing tip, increasing downforce without increasing drag.

Small sidepod winglets were significantly altered prior to the 2008 French Grand Prix, providing twin turning vanes to better control airflow over the rear of the car. At the Canadian Grand Prix tweaks were also made to the flip-up flaps in front of the rear wheels, to reduce drag. For the Italian Grand Prix, at the low-downforce Monza circuit, Williams tweaked the design of the FW30's bodywork, and front and rear wings. Sporting only a single element, with its outer edges turned upward, the rear wing was designed to reduce drag on Monza's long, fast straights, while still providing sufficient downforce during cornering. Final adjustments were made to the FW30's rear aerodynamics prior to the Brazilian Grand Prix. Here, the small winglets in front of the rear wheels were augmented by the addition of a small flap beneath their main elements, in order to better deflect airflow around the wheels and reduce the aerodynamic disruption caused by the wheels' rotation. In a later documentary, William stated that the front wing of the FW30 generated 800 kg of downforce and accounted for 25% of the car's total downforce of 3200 kg at 300 kilometres per hour.

For the Monaco Grand Prix, a race that traditionally demands a high-downforce set-up, Williams experimented with a "shark fin" engine cover, similar to that run by Renault and Red Bull. A modification was made to the front brakes' cooling ducting specifically for the 2008 Canadian Grand Prix, enlarging them to better cope with high brake loads commonly experienced when racing on the Circuit Gilles Villeneuve.

==== Engine and transmission ====
For the first time since the 2005 Formula One season Williams maintained continuity with their engine supplier. The FW30 is powered by Toyota's RVX-08 engine, which conforms to FIA 2,400 cc (146.5 cu in) V8 regulations. One major change within the engine package is due to the enforcement of a standardised, FIA-approved ECU, manufactured by McLaren Electronic Systems and distributed under the Microsoft brand. This was introduced to eliminate traction control and engine-assisted braking. Drive is via Williams's own seven-speed, semi-automatic transmission, with an electro-hydraulically activated, seamless shift mechanism.

== Competition history ==
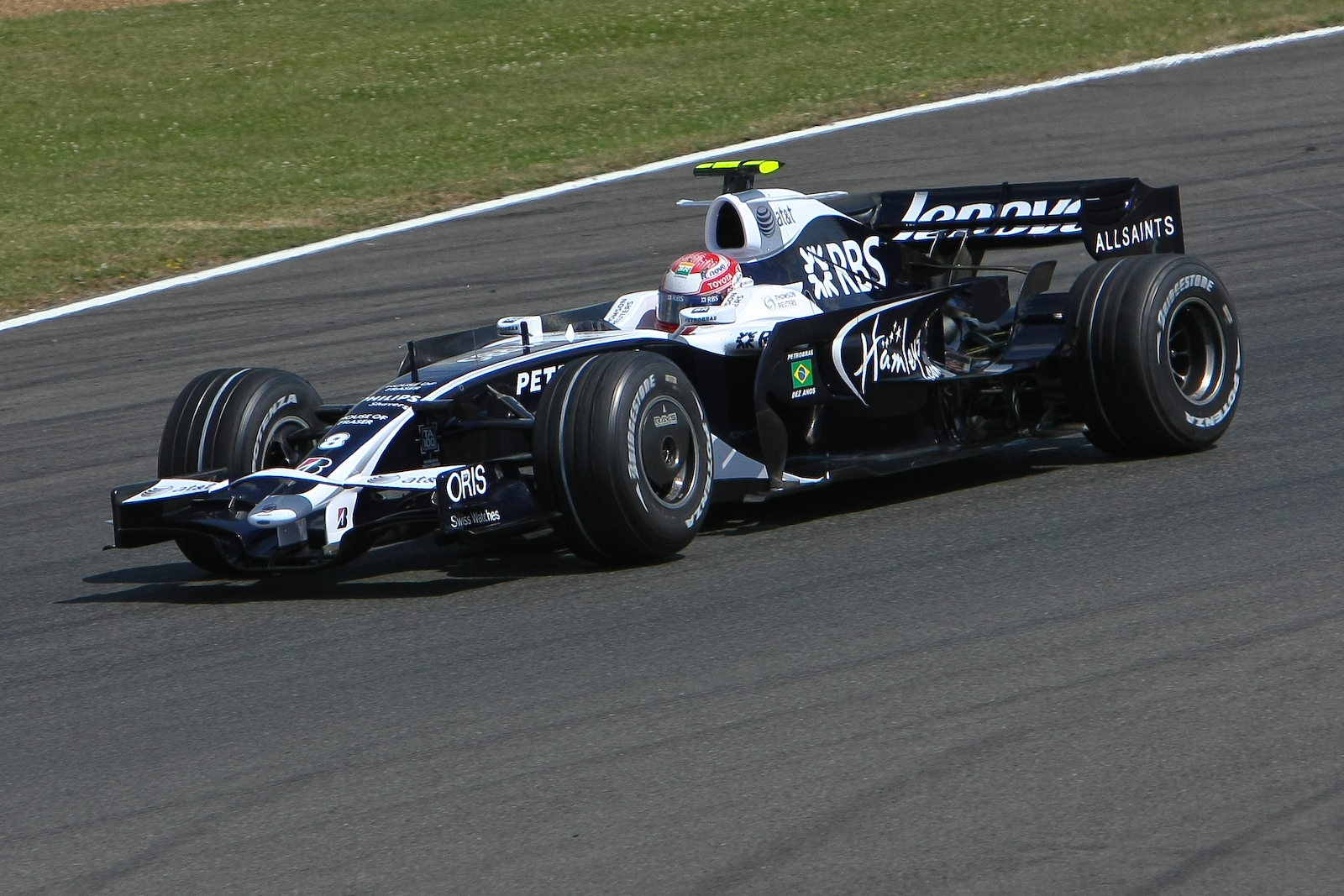
Kazuki Nakajima driving an FW30 at the 2008 British Grand Prix.

=== Launch and pre-season testing ===
The Williams FW30 was unveiled to the public at an FIA test session at the Circuit de Valencia, Spain, on 21 January 2008. There was no official, ceremonial launch event. In early pre-season testing the cars ran in six liveries that marked, variously, the names of all those employed by Williams during the development of the FW30, the 85 sponsors who have supported Williams since the formation of Williams Grand Prix Engineering in 1978, and the team's 30th season in Formula One racing.

=== Season review ===
In the opening race of the season, it was a solid start for the Williams team to celebrate its 30 years in Formula One as Nico Rosberg finally took his first podium finish while Nakajima scored his first points in Formula One in just his 2nd race for Williams. However, the remaining races saw the team slipping backwards and often struggling to score points. But the new Singapore Grand Prix saw Rosberg finish in a shock second place in front of title contender Lewis Hamilton. Williams were looking set to clinch their first victory since the 2004 Brazilian Grand Prix but Rosberg just could not overtake another shock podium finisher and winner Fernando Alonso. Thus, a first victory for Rosberg was denied but still it was his best finish in Formula One until the 2012 Chinese Grand Prix where he took his maiden career victory after starting from pole position. The team eventually finished the season eighth with 26 points, convincingly beaten by the Toyota F1 team.

== Sponsorship and livery ==
The Williams' base colour is dark blue, with white accents. Large sponsor decals were provided by the Royal Bank of Scotland and Lenovo.

At the Monaco Grand Prix, Frank Williams reached his milestone 600th Grand Prix. At the British Grand Prix, Williams celebrated its ten-year partnership with Petrobras; the cars' sidepods featured the Petrobras logo and the Brazilian flag, with the text "Dez Anos" underneath, as well as the logo for the 100th anniversary of the Territorial Army and text Reserve With Pride.

The Italian Grand Prix was the Williams team's 500th race.

== Williams FW30B ==
Williams used a B version of the FW30 during the season to test the KERS, which could be used from 2009. The car was fitted experimental aerodynamics, as well with the 2009-spec rear end and gearbox. The car was driven by Rosberg, Nakajima and Dani Clos.

== Formula One World Championship results ==
(key)

| Year | Entrant | Engine | Tyres | Drivers | 1 | 2 | 3 | 4 | 5 | 6 | 7 | 8 | 9 | 10 | 11 | 12 | 13 | 14 | 15 | 16 | 17 | 18 | Points | WCC |
|---|---|---|---|---|---|---|---|---|---|---|---|---|---|---|---|---|---|---|---|---|---|---|---|---|
| 2008 | AT&T Williams | Toyota RVX-08 V8 | B | | AUS | MAL | BHR | ESP | TUR | MON | CAN | FRA | GBR | GER | HUN | EUR | BEL | ITA | SIN | JPN | CHN | BRA | 26 | 8th |
| 2008 | AT&T Williams | Toyota RVX-08 V8 | B | Rosberg | 3 | 14 | 8 | Ret | 8 | Ret | 10 | 16 | 9 | 10 | 14 | 8 | 12 | 14 | 2 | 11 | 15 | 12 | 26 | 8th |
| 2008 | AT&T Williams | Toyota RVX-08 V8 | B | Nakajima | 6 | 17 | 14 | 7 | Ret | 7 | Ret | 15 | 8 | 14 | 13 | 15 | 14 | 12 | 8 | 15 | 12 | 17 | 26 | 8th |

== Sponsors ==
| Brand | Country | Placed on |
|---|---|---|
| RBS | United Kingdom | Nose, fin, sidepods |
| Lenovo | China | Rear wing |
| Petrobras | Brazil | Mirrors, nosecone, sidepods |
| Reuters | United Kingdom | Cockpit side |
| Hamleys | United Kingdom | Sidepods |
| Oris | Switzerland | Front wing end plate |
| Toyota | Japan | Side |
| Philips | Netherlands | Nose |
| AT&T | United States | Fin, front wing |
| House of Fraser | United Kingdom | Nose |
| AllSaints | United Kingdom | Rear wing end plate |
| Mydiamonds.com | United Kingdom | Rear wing |
