= Oky =

Oky is a different spelling of okay. It may also refer to:

== People ==
- Oky Derry Andryan (born 1993), Indonesian soccer player
- Oky Harwanto, Indonesian rally driver, who participated in the 1996 World Rally Championship
- Viscompte "Oky" Octave, son of Comptesse Mary Lindell, died in German hands during WWII

=== Characters ===
- Oky Doky, a fictional character from The Adventures of Oky Doky

== Places ==
- Oakey Army Aviation Centre (IATA airport code OKY), Oakey, Queensland, Australia
- Okayama (abbrev. Oky.), Okayama, Japan
- Okayama Prefecture (abbrev. OKY.), Japan
- Okayama International Circuit (abbrev. OKY), Mimasaka, Okayama Prefecture, Japan; a motorsports racecourse

== See also ==
- Okie
- Okayama (disambiguation)
- Okay (disambiguation)
- Okie (disambiguation)
- OK (disambiguation)
