= OK OK =

OK OK may refer to:

- "Ok Ok" (song), a 2021 song by Kanye West
- "OK OK?", a song by Half Alive from their 2019 album Now, Not Yet
- Oru Kal Oru Kannadi, a 2012 Tamil romantic comedy film written and directed by M. Rajesh
- "Oru Kal Oru Kannadi" (song), song by Yuvan Shankar Raja from the film Siva Manasula Sakthi

== See also ==
- OK (disambiguation)
