= 0K =

0K (zero K) or 0-K may refer to:

- Zero killed (used by bombers during World War II)
- Zero Kelvin, or Absolute zero
- Zero knowledge in cryptology:
  - Zero-knowledge proof
    - Non-interactive zero-knowledge proof
    - Zero-knowledge password proof
- Zero keel, a type of Suspension keel
- Zero-K, an open source real time strategy game
- Zero K (novel), a novel by Don DeLillo

== See also ==
- OK (disambiguation)
- K0 (disambiguation)
