= Kazuki Nakajima =

Japanese racing driver (born 1985)

- 中嶋 一貴
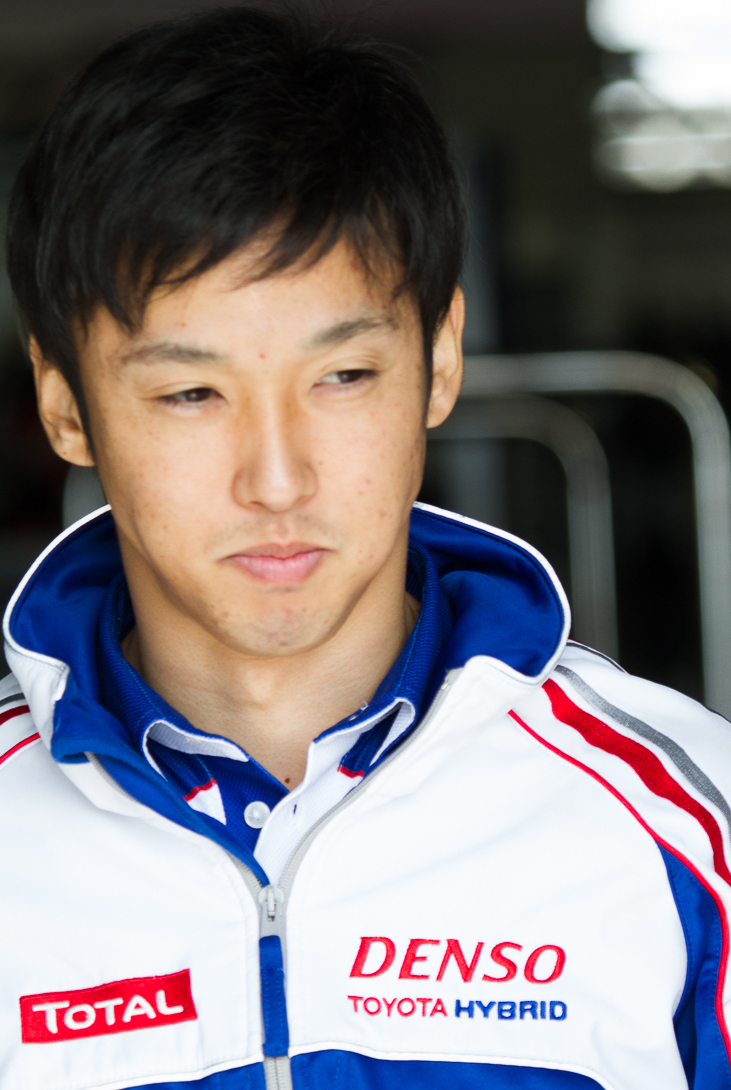
- Nakajima at the 2012 6 Hours of Fuji
- Born: 11 January 1985 (age 41); Okazaki, Aichi, Japan
- Employers: FIA WEC; Toyota (2022–present)
- Title: Vice-Chairman
- Parent: Satoru Nakajima (father)
- Relatives: Daisuke Nakajima (brother)

FIA World Endurance Championship career
- Categorisation: FIA Platinum
- Years active: 2012–2021
- Teams: Toyota
- Starts: 59
- Championships: 1 (2018–19)
- Wins: 17
- Podiums: 36
- Poles: 10
- Fastest laps: 2
- Best finish: 1st in 2018–19 (LMP1)

Formula One World Championship career
- Nationality: (Japan) Japanese
- Active years: 2007–2009
- Team: Williams
- Entries: 36
- Championships: 0
- Wins: 0
- Podiums: 0
- Career points: 9
- Pole positions: 0
- Fastest laps: 0
- First entry: 2007 Brazilian Grand Prix
- Last entry: 2009 Abu Dhabi Grand Prix

Super Formula career
- Years active: 2011–2021
- Teams: TOM'S
- Starts: 73
- Championships: 2 (2012, 2014)
- Wins: 9
- Podiums: 31
- Poles: 5
- Fastest laps: 5

24 Hours of Le Mans career
- Years: 2012–2021
- Teams: Toyota
- Best finish: 1st (2018, 2019, 2020)
- Class wins: 3 (2018, 2019, 2020)

Previous series
- 2005–2019 (Note: The exact years Nakajima competed in Super GT: 2005, 2011–2014, 2017–2019.); 2007; 2006; 2004–2005; 2003: Super GT; GP2 Series; F3 Euro Series; Japanese F3; Formula Toyota

Championship titles
- 2003: Formula Toyota

Kazuki Nakajima (Japanese: 中嶋 一貴, Hepburn: Nakajima Kazuki; born 11 January 1985) is a Japanese motorsport executive and former racing driver, who competed in Formula One for Williams from 2007 to 2009. In Japanese motorsport, Nakajima won the Super Formula Championship in 2012 and 2014 with TOM'S. (Note: The Super Formula Championship was known as the Formula Nippon Championship in 2012.) In endurance racing, Nakajima won the 2018–19 FIA World Endurance Championship, and is a three-time winner of the 24 Hours of Le Mans, which he won consecutively from 2018 to 2020, all with Toyota. Since 2022, Nakajima has served as vice-chairman of Toyota in WEC, winning three consecutive World Manufacturers' Championship titles from 2022 to 2024.

== Racing career ==
=== Before Formula One ===
Kazuki Nakajima was born on 11 January 1985 in Okazaki, Aichi, Japan. Nakajima is the son of the retired Formula One driver Satoru Nakajima. His younger brother, Daisuke, is also a racing driver. Nakajima started his career in racing in 1996, when he started karting. Three years later, he was crowned the Suzuka Formula ICA karting champion. After some impressive performances, Nakajima was picked up by Japanese car manufacturer Toyota as part of the corporation's Young Drivers Program.

Nakajima's father had been backed by Toyota's arch-rivals Honda through his career. Nakajima hoped that by joining Toyota he would shield himself against any accusations that his father had promoted his career.

In 2002, Nakajima won a scholarship in Formula Toyota, which he became champion in a year later. He progressed onto Japanese Formula Three in 2004, winning two of the 20 races and finishing fifth in the Drivers' Championship.

Nakajima stayed in Japanese Formula Three for 2005, finishing second. He dovetailed that championship with appearances in the Japanese GT300 sports car series, where he ended the year eighth.

Nakajima moved to the Formula Three Euroseries in 2006 and competed against the likes of Sebastian Vettel and Paul di Resta. After starting the year strongly with second place in the first race and a win in round four, Nakajima finished seventh with 36 points, behind his Manor Motorsport teammates Kohei Hirate (third) and Esteban Guerrieri (fourth). The championship was won by di Resta with 86 points.

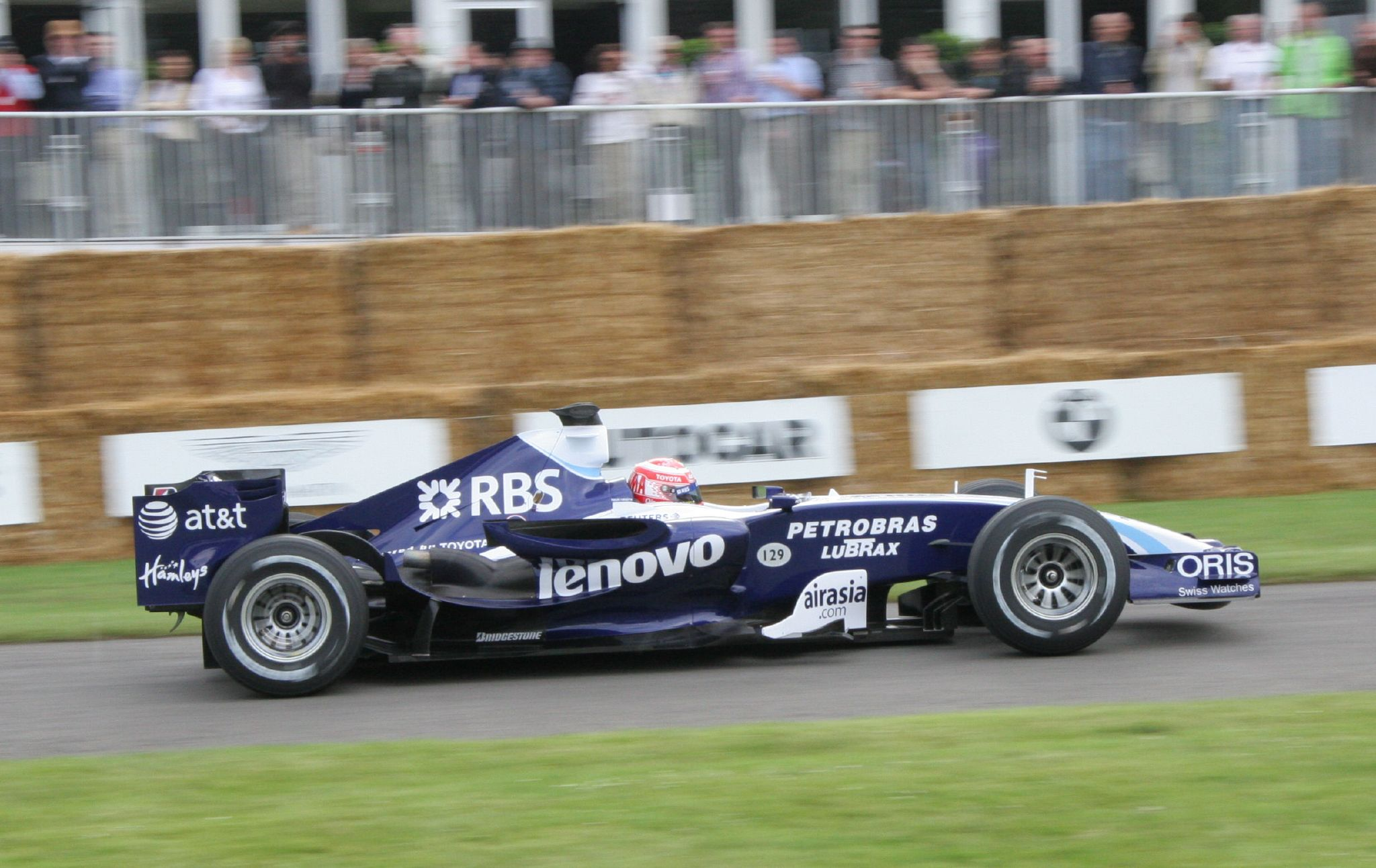
Nakajima driving the Williams FW29 at the 2007 Goodwood Festival of Speed.

In November 2006, Nakajima was named a Williams test driver for the 2007 season, alongside fellow test driver Narain Karthikeyan and race drivers Nico Rosberg and Alexander Wurz, targeting a race seat in 2008. Nakajima's debut in a Formula One car came at Fuji Speedway during November 2006, where he completed four demonstration laps in wet conditions.

Nakajima raced in the GP2 series in 2007 for the DAMS team alongside French 2005–06 A1 Grand Prix winner Nicolas Lapierre. Nakajima also served as Williams' test driver, completing 7,000 km of testing for the team.

Nakajima's first year in GP2 finished with no wins, but five consecutive podiums and ended the year as top rookie. Nakajima's fifth in the championship put him comfortably ahead of Lapierre. Nakajima was found to have caused a collision in Istanbul, when he hit leader Karun Chandhok during the sprint race, and was given a drive-through penalty.

=== Formula One ===
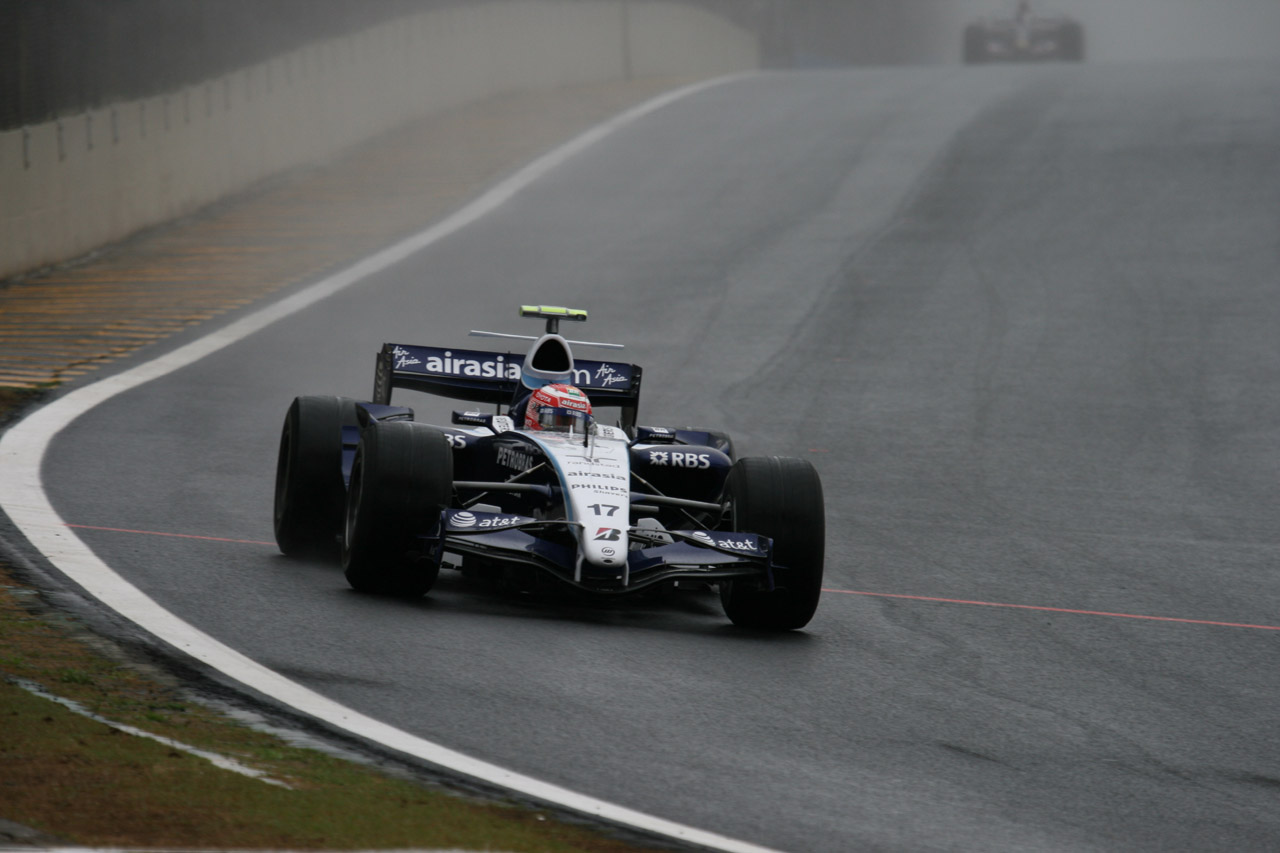
Nakajima driving in the rainy first free practice session during the 2007 Brazilian GP. His father Satoru also made his Formula One debut at the Brazilian GP in 1987.

It was announced on 9 October 2007 that following the retirement of Alexander Wurz, Nakajima would race for Williams in the season finale in Brazil. Nakajima finished tenth in the race, setting the fifth fastest lap – quicker than his teammate Nico Rosberg, who finished fourth.

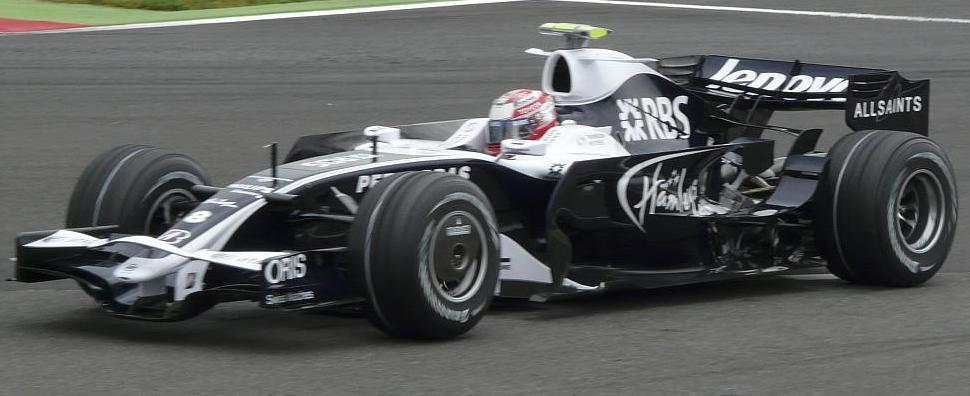
Nakajima driving for Williams at the 2008 French Grand Prix.

At his first pit stop, Nakajima overshot his box and hit two of his mechanics. The mechanics were taken to hospital for precautionary checks. Nakajima apologised for the error: "First of all I would say I'm really sorry that some of my mechanics were injured during my pitstop and that I hope they're OK. It was a good first race for me but it was slightly overshadowed."

Patrick Head commented: "Kazuki drove well on his debut. His lap times were impressive and he's set a marker for a future in Formula One. Some of our mechanics were injured today, they're having some checks done now and we send our best wishes to them."

On 7 November, it was confirmed by Williams that Nakajima would partner Rosberg at the Williams team for the 2008 season. He had a successful start to 2008 at the Australian Grand Prix, finishing seventh but promoted to sixth after Rubens Barrichello was disqualified, even whilst knocking Robert Kubica out of the race and being penalised. He then finished seventh in the Spanish Grand Prix, having outqualified his teammate. A first-corner incident with Giancarlo Fisichella at Istanbul forced him to retire. Nakajima scored two points at Monaco where no Japanese Formula One driver had previously scored a point, and retired from the 2008 Canadian Grand Prix after hitting the pit wall when pitting for a new front wing. Nakajima scored another point at the 2008 British Grand Prix, after losing seventh place on the last lap. In Singapore, Nakajima made it to the third qualifying round for the first time qualifying tenth on the grid. He went on to finish eighth and scored a point.

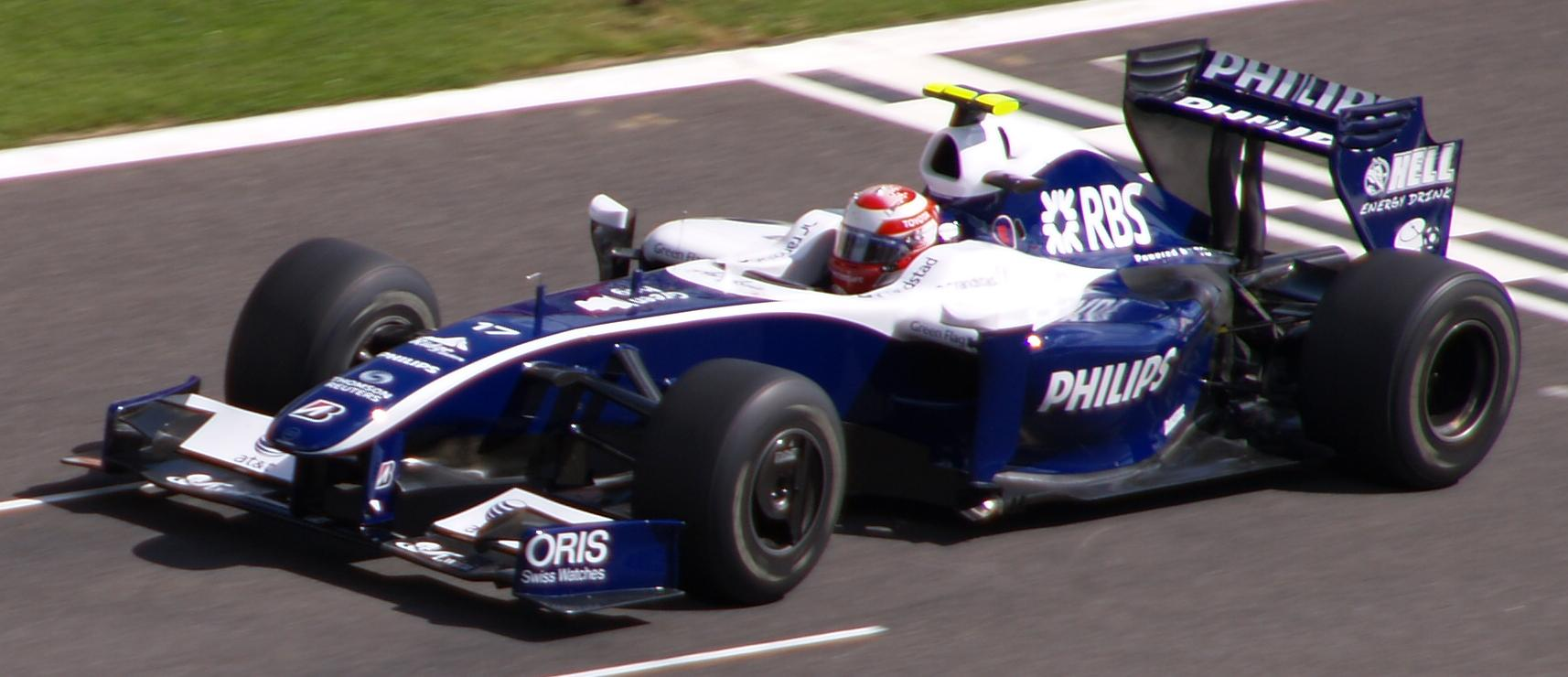
Nakajima driving for Williams at the 2009 Belgian Grand Prix.

Nakajima was retained by Williams for the 2009 season. At the 2009 Australian Grand Prix he crashed into the wall at turn six, putting him out of the race. Nakajima was the only driver to retire at Bahrain, stopping five laps before the end with overheated oil. He also crashed on the penultimate lap of the Monaco Grand Prix whilst running in 10th place. He came close to scoring at several Grands Prix, including losing a points finish after being delayed in the pit lane at the Turkish Grand Prix. At the British Grand Prix, Nakajima secured his highest ever Formula One grid slot, qualifying in an impressive fifth place ahead of world championship leader Jenson Button. However, his race was compromised by poor pit strategy, and he eventually finished outside the points. Nakajima once again nearly scored at the Hungarian Grand Prix, finishing just 0.7 seconds behind eighth place Jarno Trulli. He finished ninth again in Singapore. At Brazil Nakajima was once again in contention for points until being taken out by rookie and fellow countryman Kamui Kobayashi. Nakajima finished the season having scored no points, with his teammate Nico Rosberg being single-handedly responsible for every championship point scored by the Williams team, with Nakajima being the only non points scorer out of the drivers who took part in each race in 2009.

Williams signed Rubens Barrichello and Nico Hülkenberg for 2010, leaving Nakajima without a seat. However, in January, reports tied Nakajima to team Stefan GP, which had consolidated remnants of the Toyota F1 team after the Japanese manufacturer's withdrawal from the sport in late 2009. Stefan duly confirmed on 19 February 2010 that Nakajima was one of the team's drivers, although the team did not have an entry to the 2010 Formula One season. The FIA subsequently ruled that Stefan GP could not be entered for the season at such a late stage, so Nakajima was left with no drive in Formula One for 2010.

=== Formula Nippon / Super Formula ===
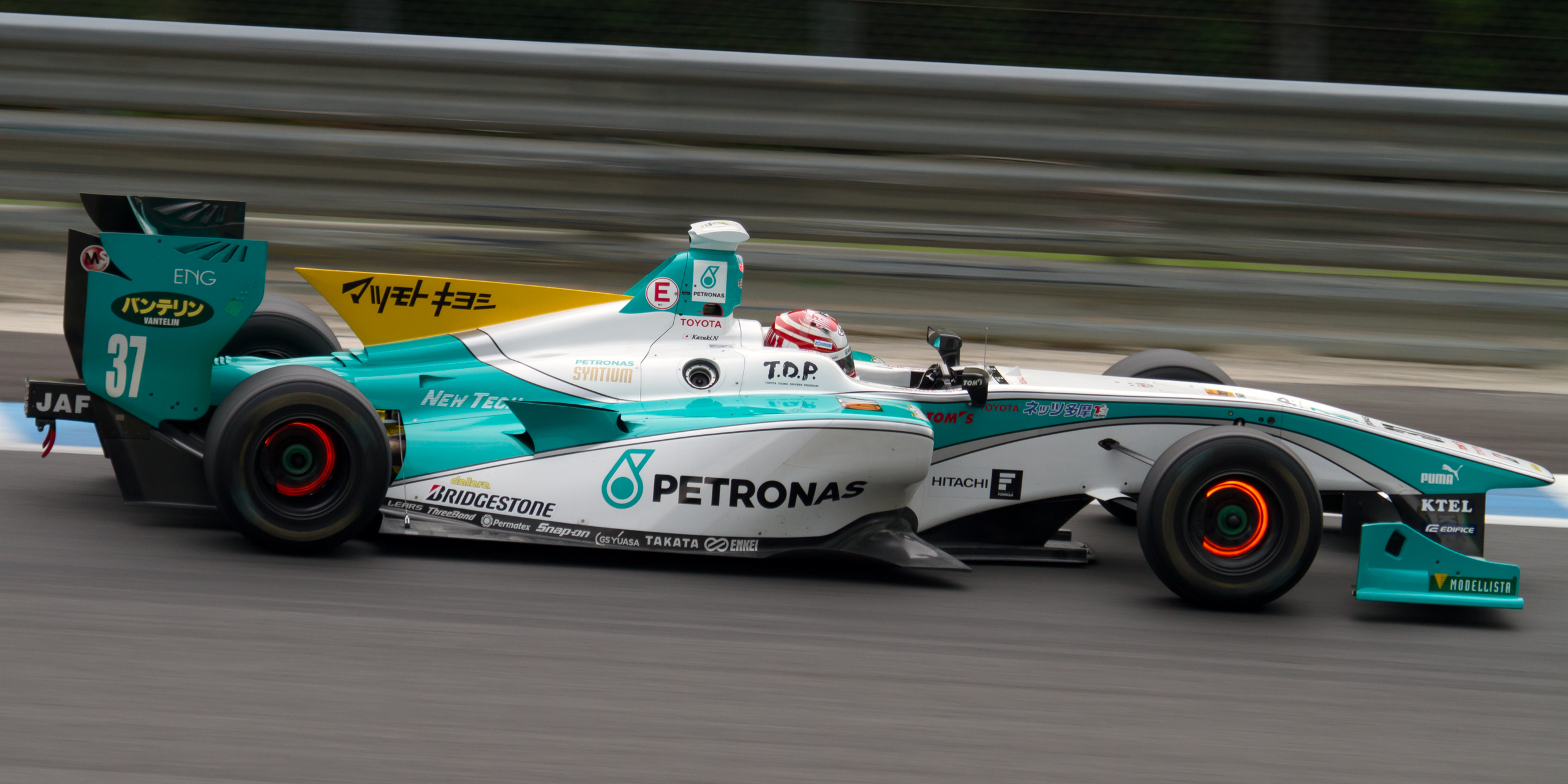
Nakajima driving the Dallara SF14 for TOM'S in 2014.

After a successful test in late 2010, Nakajima moved back to the Japanese racing scene by competing in Formula Nippon for 2011. Driving for the TOM'S team, he won his first race at the second round of the season, held at Autopolis, which also moved him into the lead of the drivers' standings. He ultimately finished runner-up to André Lotterer. He continued in the series for the 2012 season winning the title. In the 2013 season, he could not defend his Super Formula title finishing fourth overall. However, in the 2014 season, he regained the title with his Petronas Team TOM'S team. In the 2015 season, he ended up second overall.

Nakajima's younger brother, Daisuke, competed in the series until 2017.

=== Super GT ===
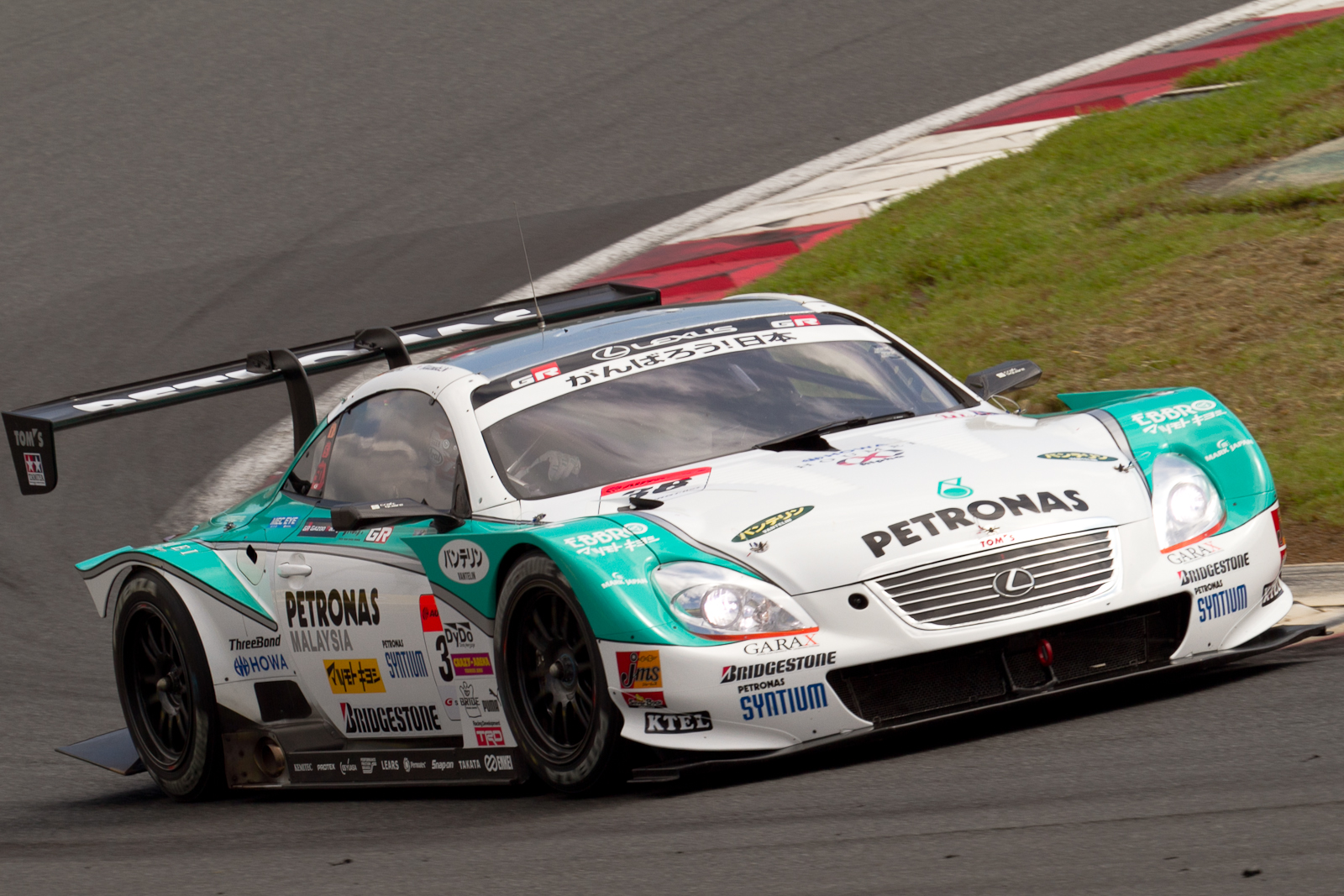
Nakajima racing for Petronas Team TOM'S in 2011.

Nakajima first competed in the Japanese Super GT series in 2005, driving a Toyota MR-S in the GT300 class with Minoru Tanaka. He returned to the category in 2011, driving a Lexus SC430 in the GT500 class with Formula Nippon rival Lotterer. For 2012, he continued to drive a SC430, now partnered with Loïc Duval. In 2013, he partnered with James Rossiter, scoring two wins and a third-place finish to rank third in the drivers standings. In 2014, he drove a Lexus RC F with Rossiter, winning two races.

Nakajima returned to the Japanese Super GT in 2017 with a TOM's Lexus LC.

=== FIA World Endurance Championship ===
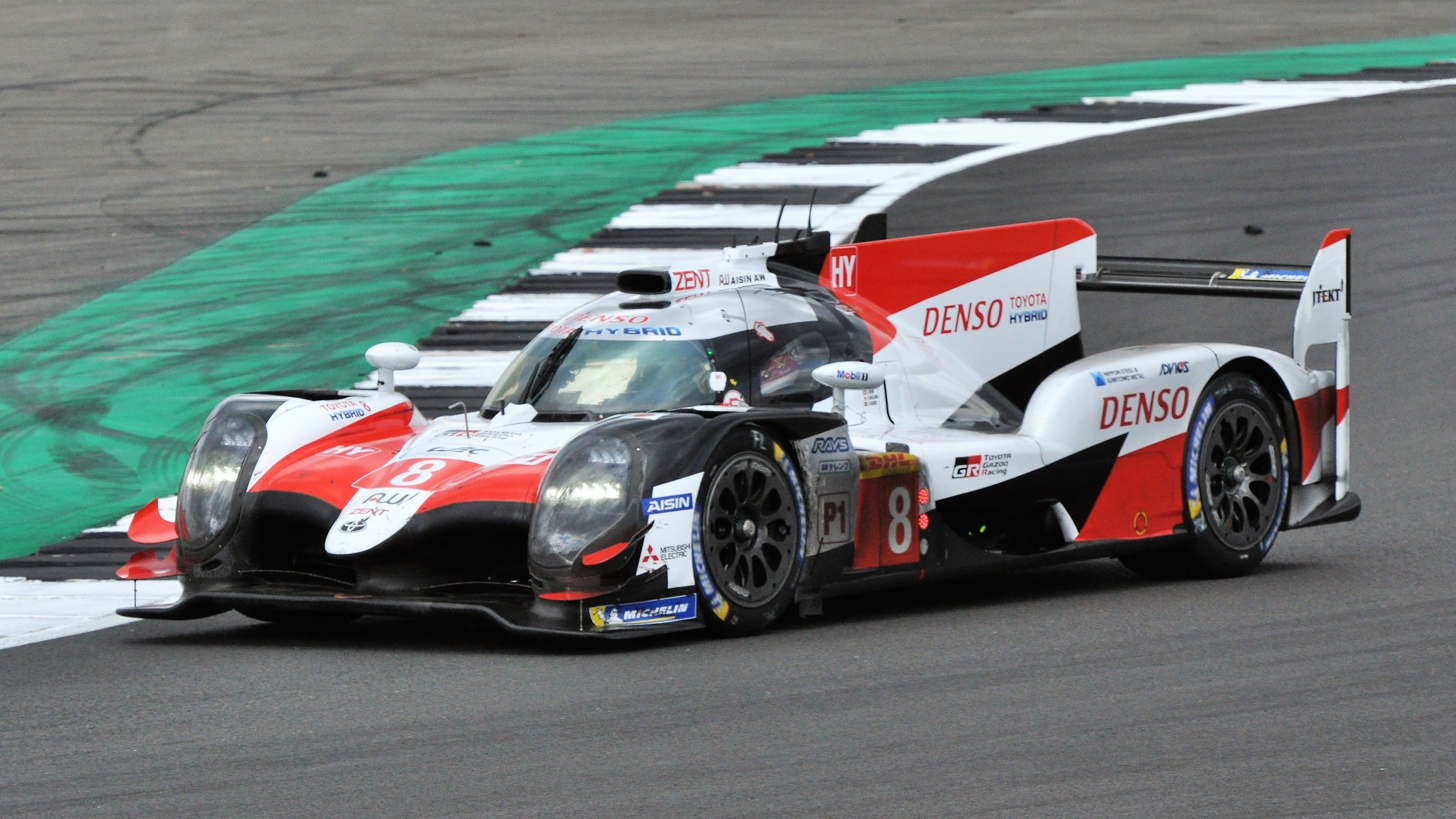
Nakajima driving in the 2018 6 Hours of Silverstone.

In 2012, Nakajima was selected by Toyota to be one of the drivers for its assault on the 24 Hours of Le Mans race and the FIA World Endurance Championship, driving the prototype Toyota TS030 Hybrid. At Le Mans, he hit the Nissan DeltaWing hard enough to knock it off the circuit, causing substantial damage to the Nissan, and significant damage to his own car — neither car finished the race. He finished runner-up at the 2012 6 Hours of Silverstone. At the 2012 6 Hours of Fuji, Nakajima took pole position for Toyota before triple stinting in the race to bring home the TS030's second win in competition and Nakajima's first with the team.

Nakajima continued as Toyota LMP1 part-time driver the next two seasons. He won the 2013 6 Hours of Fuji, a race cancelled with no laps under green flag. In 2014, he finished second at Silverstone, Fuji and Shanghai.

Nakajima became a Toyota LMP1 full-time driver for the 2015 FIA World Endurance Championship, scoring a third place at Silverstone as best result. In 2016, he scored a third-place finish at Shanghai.

Nakajima began the 2017 season with two wins at Silverstone and Spa.

Nakajima won the 2018 Le Mans 24 Hours race in the No. 8 Toyota, along with Fernando Alonso and Sébastian Buemi.

Nakajima, Buemi and Alonso then repeated the achievement in 2019, at the same time clinching the 2018–19 FIA World Endurance Championship, making Nakajima the second Japanese FIA world champion after Toshi Arai.

Nakajima retired from racing after the 2021 FIA World Endurance Championship to take on the role of vice-chairman at Toyota Gazoo Racing Europe, with Ryō Hirakawa taking over his seat.

== Racing record ==
=== Career summary ===
Season	Series	Team	Races	Wins	Poles	F/Laps	Podiums	Points	Position
2003	Formula Toyota	TOM'S Spirits	10	3	3	3	?	134	**1st**
2004	Japanese Formula 3 Championship	TOM'S	20	2	2	1	4	138	5th
2004	Macau Grand Prix	TOM'S	1	0	0	0	0	N/A	13th
2004	Bahrain F3 Superprix	TOM'S	1	0	0	0	0	N/A	7th
2005	Japanese Formula 3 Championship	TOM'S	20	2	3	7	12	209	**2nd**
2005	Macau Grand Prix	TOM'S	1	0	0	0	0	N/A	5th
2005	Super GT – GT300	Kicchouhouzan with APR	7	1	1	?	1	52	8th
2006	Formula 3 Euro Series	Manor Motorsport	20	1	0	3	4	36	7th
2006	Macau Grand Prix	Manor Motorsport	1	0	0	0	0	N/A	NC
2006	Masters of Formula 3	Manor Motorsport	1	0	0	0	0	N/A	26th
2007	Formula One	AT&T Williams	1	0	0	0	0	0	22nd
2007	GP2 Series	DAMS	21	0	1	3	6	44	5th
2008	Formula One	AT&T Williams	18	0	0	0	0	9	15th
2009	Formula One	AT&T Williams	17	0	0	0	0	0	20th
2010	Formula Nippon	Petronas Team TOM'S	Test driver						
2011	Formula Nippon	Petronas Team TOM'S	8	1	0	1	7	42	**2nd**
2011	Super GT - GT500	Petronas Team TOM'S	8	0	0	0	0	39	8th
2012	Formula Nippon	Petronas Team TOM'S	8	2	1	0	4	46	**1st**
2012	Super GT - GT500	Petronas Team TOM'S	8	0	0	0	1	40	7th
2012	FIA World Endurance Championship	Toyota Racing	3	1	1	1	2	44	13th
2012	24 Hours of Le Mans	Toyota Racing	1	0	0	0	0	N/A	DNF
2013	Super Formula	Petronas Team TOM'S	7	2	1	1	2	24	4th
2013	Super GT - GT500	Petronas Team TOM'S	8	2	1	1	3	60	**3rd**
2013	FIA World Endurance Championship	Toyota Racing	4	1	1	0	1	37.5	12th
2013	24 Hours of Le Mans	Toyota Racing	1	0	0	0	0	N/A	4th
2014	Super Formula	Petronas Team TOM'S	9	2	1	0	6	46	**1st**
2014	Super GT - GT500	Petronas Team TOM'S	6	2	1	0	2	60	5th
2014	FIA World Endurance Championship	Toyota Racing	5	0	2	0	4	71	8th
2014	24 Hours of Le Mans	Toyota Racing	1	0	0	0	0	N/A	DNF
2015	Super Formula	Petronas Team TOM'S	7	1	0	1	5	45.5	**2nd**
2015	FIA World Endurance Championship	Toyota Racing	7	0	0	0	1	75	7th
2015	24 Hours of Le Mans	Toyota Racing	1	0	0	0	0	N/A	8th
2016	FIA World Endurance Championship	Toyota Gazoo Racing	9	0	0	0	1	60	8th
2016	24 Hours of Le Mans	Toyota Gazoo Racing	1	0	0	0	0	N/A	NC
2016	Super Formula	VANTELIN Team TOM'S	9	0	1	2	2	22	6th
2017	FIA World Endurance Championship	Toyota Gazoo Racing	9	5	0	0	8	183	**2nd**
2017	24 Hours of Le Mans	Toyota Gazoo Racing	1	0	0	0	0	N/A	8th
2017	Super GT	Lexus Team au TOM's	7	1	0	0	1	47	6th
2017	Super Formula	Vantelin Team TOM's	7	1	1	0	2	22	5th
2018	Super GT - GT500	Lexus Team au TOM's	7	1	0	0	2	47	6th
2018	Super Formula	Vantelin Team TOM's	5	0	0	0	1	15	6th
2018	24 Hours of Le Mans	Toyota Gazoo Racing	1	1	1	0	1	N/A	**1st**
2018–19	FIA World Endurance Championship	Toyota Gazoo Racing	8	5	3	1	7	198	**1st**
2019	Super GT - GT500	Lexus Team au TOM's	7	1	2	1	2	38	7th
2019	Super Formula	Vantelin Team TOM's	7	0	0	0	1	12	12th
2019	24 Hours of Le Mans	Toyota Gazoo Racing	1	1	0	0	1	N/A	**1st**
2019-20	FIA World Endurance Championship	Toyota Gazoo Racing	8	2	1	0	8	202	**2nd**
2020	Super Formula	Vantelin Team TOM's	5	0	0	0	1	25	11th
2020	24 Hours of Le Mans	Toyota Gazoo Racing	1	1	0	0	1	N/A	**1st**
2021	FIA World Endurance Championship	Toyota Gazoo Racing	6	3	0	0	5	168	**2nd**
2021	24 Hours of Le Mans	Toyota Gazoo Racing	1	0	0	0	1	N/A	**2nd**
2021	Super Formula	Kuo Vantelin Team TOM's	2	0	0	0	0	4	16th
2023	Super Taikyu - ST-Z	Naniwa Denso Team Impul	1	0	0	0	0	59.5‡	7th‡
2023	FIA World Endurance Championship	Toyota Gazoo Racing	Reserve driver						
2024	Super Taikyu - ST-Q	GR Team Spirit							
2024	Nürburgring Langstrecken-Serie - SP8T	Toyota Gazoo Racing							
2025	Super Taikyu - ST-Q	Toyota Gazoo Rookie Racing							
2025	Super Taikyu - ST-USA-2	TechSport Racing							
2026	Nürburgring Langstrecken-Serie - SP2T	Toyota Gazoo Rookie Racing							

‡ Team standings

=== Complete Macau Grand Prix results ===
Year	Team	Car	Qualifying	Quali Race	Main race
2004	(Japan) TOM'S	Dallara F304	9th	DNF	13th
2005	(Japan) TOM'S	Dallara F305	8th	7th	5th
2006	(United Kingdom) Manor Motorsport	Dallara F305	8th	8th	DNF

=== Complete Japanese Formula Three Championship results ===
(key) (Races in bold indicate pole position) (Races in italics indicate fastest lap)

Year	Team	Engine	1	2	3	4	5	6	7	8	9	10	11	12	13	14	15	16	17	18	19	20	DC	Pts
2004	TOM'S	Toyota	**SUZ**; **1**; 1	**SUZ**; **2**; 1	TSU; 1; 7	TSU; 2; 9	OKA; 1; 3	OKA; 2; 6	MOT; 1; 6	MOT; 2 Ret	SUZ; 1; 6	SUZ; 2 Ret	SUG; 1; 4	SUG; 2 Ret	MIN; 1; 9	MIN; 2; 11	SEN; 1; 5	SEN; 2; 5	MIN; 1; 4	MIN; 2; 3	MOT; 1; 9	MOT; 2; 4	5th	138
2005	TOM'S	Toyota	MOT; 1 Ret	MOT; 2 Ret	SUZ; 1; 3	SUZ; 2; 3	SUG; 1; 4	SUG; 2; 3	FUJ; 1; 2	**FUJ**; **2**; 2	OKA; 1; 4	OKA; 2; 8	SUZ; 1; 2	SUZ; 2; 5	MIN; 1; 1	MIN; 2; 1	**FUJ**; **1**; 2	**FUJ**; **2**; 2	MIN; 1 Ret	MIN; 2; 2	MOT; 1; 3	MOT; 2 Ret	2nd	209

=== Complete Formula 3 Euro Series results ===
(key) (Races in bold indicate pole position; races in italics indicate fastest lap)

Year	Team	Chassis	Engine	1	2	3	4	5	6	7	8	9	10	11	12	13	14	15	16	17	18	19	20	Pos	Points
2006	Manor Motorsport	Dallara F305/062	Mercedes	HOC; 1; 2	HOC; 2; 6	LAU; 1; 8	LAU; 2; 1	OSC; 1; 6	OSC; 2; 5	BRH; 1; 14	BRH; 2; 13	NOR; 1 Ret	NOR; 2; 5	NÜR; 1; 9	NÜR; 2; 18	ZAN; 1; 22	ZAN; 2; 3	CAT; 1; 4	CAT; 2; 3	BUG; 1; 11	BUG; 2; 7	HOC; 1 Ret	HOC; 2 DNS	7th	36

=== Complete GP2 Series results ===
(key) (Races in bold indicate pole position) (Races in italics indicate fastest lap)

Year	Entrant	1	2	3	4	5	6	7	8	9	10	11	12	13	14	15	16	17	18	19	20	21	DC	Points
2007	DAMS	BHR; FEA; 17	BHR; SPR; 6	CAT; FEA; 15	CAT; SPR; 7	MON; FEA; 10	MAG; FEA; 17	MAG; SPR; 6	SIL; FEA; 3	SIL; SPR; 3	NÜR; FEA; 3	NÜR; SPR; 3	HUN; FEA; 2	HUN; SPR; Ret	IST; FEA; 6	IST; SPR; Ret	MNZ; FEA; DSQ	MNZ; SPR; 18	SPA; FEA; Ret	SPA; SPR; 9	**VAL**; **FEA**; 3	VAL; SPR; 7	5th	44

=== Complete Formula One results ===
(key) (Races in bold indicate pole position; races in italics indicate fastest lap)

Year	Entrant	Chassis	Engine	1	2	3	4	5	6	7	8	9	10	11	12	13	14	15	16	17	18	WDC	Points
2007	AT&T Williams	Williams FW29	Toyota RVX-07 2.4 V8	AUS; TD	MAL; TD	BHR	ESP	MON	CAN; TD	USA; TD	FRA	GBR	EUR	HUN	TUR	ITA	BEL	JPN	CHN; TD	BRA; 10		22nd	0
2008	AT&T Williams	Williams FW30	Toyota RVX-08 2.4 V8	AUS; 6	MAL; 17	BHR; 14	ESP; 7	TUR; Ret	MON; 7	CAN; Ret	FRA; 15	GBR; 8	GER; 14	HUN; 13	EUR; 15	BEL; 14	ITA; 12	SIN; 8	JPN; 15	CHN; 12	BRA; 17	15th	9
2009	AT&T Williams	Williams FW31	Toyota RVX-09 2.4 V8	AUS; Ret	MAL; 12	CHN; Ret	BHR; Ret	ESP; 13	MON; 15^{†}	TUR; 12	GBR; 11	GER; 12	HUN; 9	EUR; 18^{†}	BEL; 13	ITA; 10	SIN; 9	JPN; 15	BRA; Ret	ABU; 13		20th	0

^{†} Did not finish, but was classified as he had completed more than 90% of the race distance.

=== Complete Super GT results ===
(key) (Races in bold indicate pole position) (Races in italics indicate fastest lap)

Year	Team	Car	Class	1	2	3	4	5	6	7	8	DC	Points
2005	apr	Toyota MR-S	GT300	OKA; 4	FUJ; 5	SEP; 5	SUG; 1	MOT; Ret	FUJ; 7	AUT; Ret	SUZ; 7	8th	52
2011	Petronas Team TOM'S	Lexus SC430	GT500	OKA; 4	FUJ; 4	SEP; 6	SUG; 9	SUZ; 6	FUJ; 15	AUT; 4	MOT; 8	8th	39
2012	Petronas Team TOM'S	Lexus SC430	GT500	OKA; 5	FUJ; 4	SEP; 13	SUG; 2	SUZ; Ret	FUJ; 4	AUT; 15	MOT; 8	7th	40
2013	Lexus Team Petronas TOM'S	Lexus SC430	GT500	OKA; 12	**FUJ**; 1	SEP; 11	SUG; 10	SUZ; 3	FUJ; 12	AUT; 1	MOT; 5	3rd	60
2014	Lexus Team Petronas TOM'S	Lexus RC F	GT500	OKA; 13	FUJ	AUT	**SUG**; 4	FUJ; 5	**SUZ**; 1	BUR; 1	MOT; 10	5th	60
2017	Lexus Team au TOM's	Lexus LC 500	GT500	OKA; 5	FUJ	AUT; 1	SUG; 7	FUJ; 4	SUZ; 9	BUR; 5	MOT; 14	6th	47
2018	Lexus Team au TOM's	Lexus LC 500	GT500	OKA; 13	FUJ	SUZ; 5	CHA; 10	FUJ; 1	SUG; 12	AUT; 2	MOT; 13	6th	47
2019	Lexus Team au TOM's	Lexus LC 500	GT500	OKA; 9‡	FUJ	**SUZ**; 1	CHA; 9	FUJ; Ret	AUT; 10	SUG; 10	**MOT**; 3	7th	38

^{‡} Half points awarded as less than 75% of race distance was completed.

=== Complete Formula Nippon/Super Formula results ===
(key) (Races in bold indicate pole position; races in italics indicate fastest lap)

Year	Team	Engine	1	2	3	4	5	6	7	8	9	DC	Points
2011	Petronas Team TOM'S	Toyota	SUZ; 3	AUT; 1	FUJ; 3	MOT; 3	SUZ; C	SUG; 3	MOT; 2	MOT; 2		2nd	42
2012	Petronas Team TOM'S	Toyota	SUZ; 1	MOT; 3	AUT; 5	**FUJ**; 2	MOT; 4	SUG; 5	SUZ; 12	SUZ; 1		1st	46
2013	Petronas Team TOM'S	Toyota	SUZ; 5	AUT; 12	FUJ; 8	**MOT**; 1	SUG; Ret	SUZ; Ret	SUZ; 1			4th	24
2014	Petronas Team TOM'S	Toyota	SUZ; 5	FUJ; 2	FUJ; 3	FUJ; 1	MOT; 7	AUT; 6	SUG; 2	SUZ; 2	**SUZ**; 1	1st	46
2015	Petronas Team TOM'S	Toyota	SUZ; 2	OKA	FUJ; 2	MOT; 2	AUT; 1	SUG; 4	SUZ; 4	SUZ; 2		2nd	45.5
2016	Vantelin Team TOM'S	Toyota	SUZ; 12	OKA; 17	FUJ; 2	MOT; 7	**OKA**; 19	OKA; 2	SUG; 4	SUZ; 5	SUZ; 16	6th	22
2017	Vantelin Team TOM'S	Toyota	**SUZ**; 1	OKA; 9	OKA; 18	FUJ; 7	MOT; 11	AUT; 6	SUG; 3	SUZ; C	SUZ; C	5th	22
2018	Vantelin Team TOM'S	Toyota	SUZ; 8	AUT; C	SUG; 3	FUJ; 5	MOT	OKA; 17	SUZ; 5			6th	15
2019	Vantelin Team TOM'S	Toyota	SUZ; Ret	AUT; 13	SUG; 12	FUJ; 5	MOT; 16	OKA; 2	SUZ; 14			12th	12
2020	Vantelin Team TOM'S	Toyota	MOT; 4	OKA	SUG; 15	AUT	SUZ; 2	SUZ; 16	FUJ; 9			11th	25
2021	Kuo Vantelin Team TOM'S	Toyota	FUJ; 11	SUZ	AUT	SUG	MOT	MOT; 7	SUZ			16th	4

=== Complete 24 Hours of Le Mans results ===
Year	Team	Co-Drivers	Car	Class	Laps	Pos.	Class Pos.
2012	(Japan) Toyota Racing	(France) Nicolas Lapierre (Austria) Alexander Wurz	Toyota TS030 Hybrid	LMP1	134	DNF	DNF
2013	(Japan) Toyota Racing	(France) Nicolas Lapierre (Austria) Alexander Wurz	Toyota TS030 Hybrid	LMP1	341	4th	4th
2014	(Japan) Toyota Racing	(France) Stéphane Sarrazin (Austria) Alexander Wurz	Toyota TS040 Hybrid	LMP1-H	219	DNF	DNF
2015	(Japan) Toyota Racing	(Switzerland) Sébastien Buemi (United Kingdom) Anthony Davidson	Toyota TS040 Hybrid	LMP1	386	8th	8th
2016	(Japan) Toyota Gazoo Racing	(Switzerland) Sébastien Buemi (United Kingdom) Anthony Davidson	Toyota TS050 Hybrid	LMP1	384	NC	NC
2017	(Japan) Toyota Gazoo Racing	(Switzerland) Sébastien Buemi (United Kingdom) Anthony Davidson	Toyota TS050 Hybrid	LMP1	358	8th	**2nd**
2018	(Japan) Toyota Gazoo Racing	(Spain) Fernando Alonso (Switzerland) Sébastien Buemi	Toyota TS050 Hybrid	LMP1	388	**1st**	**1st**
2019	(Japan) Toyota Gazoo Racing	(Spain) Fernando Alonso (Switzerland) Sébastien Buemi	Toyota TS050 Hybrid	LMP1	385	**1st**	**1st**
2020	(Japan) Toyota Gazoo Racing	(New Zealand) Brendon Hartley (Switzerland) Sébastien Buemi	Toyota TS050 Hybrid	LMP1	387	**1st**	**1st**
2021	(Japan) Toyota Gazoo Racing	(New Zealand) Brendon Hartley (Switzerland) Sébastien Buemi	Toyota GR010 Hybrid	Hypercar	369	**2nd**	**2nd**

=== Complete FIA World Endurance Championship results ===
Year	Entrant	Class	Chassis	Engine	1	2	3	4	5	6	7	8	9	Rank	Points
2012	Toyota Racing	LMP1	Toyota TS030 Hybrid	Toyota 3.4 L V8 (Hybrid)	SEB	SPA	LMS; Ret	SIL; 2	SÃO	BHR	**FUJ**; 1	SHA		13th	44
2013	Toyota Racing	LMP1	Toyota TS030 Hybrid	Toyota 3.4 L V8 (Hybrid)	SIL	SPA; Ret	LMS; 4	SÃO	COA	FUJ; 1	SHA	**BHR**; Ret		12th	37.5
2014	Toyota Racing	LMP1	Toyota TS040 Hybrid	Toyota 3.7 L V8 (Hybrid)	**SIL**; 2	SPA; 3	**LMS**; Ret	COA	FUJ; 2	SHA; 2	BHR	SÃO		8th	71
2015	Toyota Racing	LMP1	Toyota TS040 Hybrid	Toyota 3.7 L V8 (Hybrid)	SIL; 3	SPA; WD	LMS; 8	NÜR; 5	COA; 4	FUJ; 5	SHA; 6	BHR; 4		7th	75
2016	Toyota Gazoo Racing	LMP1	Toyota TS050 Hybrid	Toyota 2.4 L Turbo V6 (Hybrid)	SIL; 16	SPA; 27	LMS; NC	NÜR; 5	MEX; Ret	COA; 5	FUJ; 4	SHA; 3	BHR; 4	8th	60
2017	Toyota Gazoo Racing	LMP1	Toyota TS050 Hybrid	Toyota 2.4 L Turbo V6 (Hybrid)	SIL; 1	SPA; 1	LMS; 6	NÜR; 4	MEX; 3	COA; 3	FUJ; 1	SHA; 1	BHR; 1	2nd	183
2018–19	Toyota Gazoo Racing	LMP1	Toyota TS050 Hybrid	Toyota 2.4 L Turbo V6 (Hybrid)	**SPA**; 1	**LMS**; 1	SIL; DSQ	**FUJ**; 2	SHA; 2	**SEB**; 1	SPA; 1	LMS; 1		1st	198
2019–20	Toyota Gazoo Racing	LMP1	Toyota TS050 Hybrid	Toyota 2.4 L Turbo V6 (Hybrid)	SIL; 2	**FUJ**; 1	SHA; 2	BHR; 2	COA; 2	SPA; 2	LMS; 1	BHR; 2		2nd	202
2021	Toyota Gazoo Racing	Hypercar	Toyota GR010 Hybrid	Toyota 3.5 L Turbo V6 (Hybrid)	SPA; 1	ALG; 1	MNZ; 4	LMS; 2	**BHR**; 2	BHR; 1				2nd	168

== Notes ==
Sporting positions
Preceded by Wataru Kobayakawa	Formula Toyota; Champion; 2003	Succeeded by Hideto Yasuoka
Preceded by André Lotterer	Formula Nippon; Champion; 2012	Succeeded by Naoki Yamamoto (Super Formula)
Preceded by Naoki Yamamoto	Super Formula; Champion; 2014	Succeeded by Hiroaki Ishiura
Preceded by Timo Bernhard; Brendon Hartley; Earl Bamber	Winner of the 24 Hours of Le Mans; 2018, 2019, 2020; With: Fernando Alonso (2018-19), Sébastien Buemi (2018-20) & Brendon Hartley (2020)	Succeeded by Mike Conway; Kamui Kobayashi; José María López
Preceded by Timo Bernhard; Brendon Hartley; Earl Bamber	World Endurance Drivers Champion; 2018–19; With: Sébastien Buemi & Fernando Alonso	Succeeded by Mike Conway; Kamui Kobayashi; José María López
