= K0 =

K0 may refer to:

- Spectral class K0, a star spectral class
- the 1965 first model of the Honda CB450 motorbike

K_{0} may refer to:

- the Grothendieck group in abstract algebra
- the lateral earth pressure at rest
- Khinchin's constant
- the order-zero graph

K^{0} may refer to:

- the neutral kaon, a strange meson with no charge in nuclear physics

== See also ==
- KO (disambiguation)
- 0K (disambiguation)
