= Ok (Turkish surname) =

Ok (Turkish: Arrow) is a Turkish surname. Notable people with the surname include:

- Fügen Ok, Turkish diplomat
- Hilmi Ok (1932–2020), Turkish football referee
- Mustafa Ok (1925–2009), Turkish military officer and politician
- Nurettin Ok (1927–2013), Turkish lawyer and politician
