= Okay (disambiguation) =

Okay is a term of approval, assent, or acknowledgment.

Okay may also refer to:

== Film ==
- Okay (film), a 2002 Danish film by Jesper W. Nielsen
- Okay!: The ASD Band Film, a 2022 Canadian documentary

== Music ==
=== Albums and songs ===
- Okay (album), by As It Is, or the title song, 2017
- Okay, an album by Dowsing, 2016
- "Okay" (JT song), 2024
- "Okay" (LANY and Julia Michaels song), 2019
- "Okay!" (Dave Dee, Dozy, Beaky, Mick & Tich song), 1967
- "Okay!" (Forrest Frank song), 2026
- "Okay", a song by Lil Baby and Lil Durk from The Voice of the Heroes, 2021
- "Okay", a song by Nivea from Complicated, 2005
- "Okay", a song by Usher from Raymond v. Raymond, 2010
- "Okay", a song by X Ambassadors from The Beautiful Liar, 2021
- "Okay", a song by Backhouse Mike, 2006
- "Okay Okay", a song by Lights from Pep, 2022

=== Other uses in music ===
- Okay (band), a German pop group with a 1987 hit song of the same name
- Okeh Records, an American record label

== Places ==
- Okay, Arkansas
- Okay, Oklahoma
- Okay High School, in Okay, Oklahoma

== Other ==
- Okay (name), Turkish masculine given name and surname
- Okay Airways, a Chinese airline
- Onnu Kure Áyiram Yogam (OKAY), a people's association in Kodungallur, Kerala, India

== See also ==
- OK (disambiguation)
- Okaya (disambiguation)
- Okey (disambiguation)
