= OK (disambiguation) =

OK is a word expressing approval or assent. OK or Ok may also refer to:

- OK (gesture)

== Entertainment ==
=== Albums ===
- OK (Chang Chen-yue album), 2007
- OK (The Fall of Troy album), 2016
- O.K. (Gabby's World album), 2015
- O.K. (Kool A.D. album), 2015
- OK (Talvin Singh album), 1998
- OK, by Gazzelle, 2021

=== Songs ===
- "OK" (Big Brovaz song), 2003
- "OK" (Farin Urlaub song), 2002
- "OK" (Kanye West song), 2026
- "OK" (Robin Schulz song), 2017
- "OK", by Backstreet Boys from DNA, 2019
- "Ok", by Beastie Boys from Hot Sauce Committee Part Two, 2011
- "OK", by Eels from Earth to Dora, 2020
- "OK", by Fujiya & Miyagi from Ventriloquizzing, 2011
- "Ok", by Helena Paparizou from Protereotita, 2004
- "OK", by Inna from Party Never Ends, 2013
- "OK", by Iyaz from Replay, 2010
- "OK!", by Jauz and San Holo, 2016
- "OK", by Katy Perry from 143, 2024
- "OK", by Madeon from Adventure, 2015
- "OK", by Meg from Beam, 2007
- "OK", by Nav from Bad Habits, 2019
- "OK!", by NCT from Universe, 2021
- "OK!", a Pokémon theme song
- "O.K.?", from the Rock Follies of '77 soundtrack, 1977
- "OK", by Sam Ryder from There's Nothing but Space, Man!, 2022
- "OK", by Wallows, 2020
- "OK (Anxiety Anthem)", by Mabel from High Expectations, 2019

=== Other entertainment ===
- Organized Konfusion or OK, a hip hop act
- o.k. (film), a 1970 West German anti-Vietnam War film by Michael Verhoeven
- Super (2010 Indian film), starring Upendra, officially known as 👌 (OK)
- OK!, a British celebrity tabloid
- OK! TV, a program affiliated with the magazine

== Language ==
- Ok languages, a family of languages spoken in New Guinea
- Old Korean, the earliest attested stage of the Korean language

== People ==
- Ok (Korean name), a family and given name, including a list of people with the name
- Ok (Turkish surname), list of people with the surname
- Mountain Ok people of New Guinea, also known as the Min peoples

== Places ==
- Ok (volcano), a shield volcano in Iceland
- O.K. Corral, in Tombstone, Arizona
- O.K. Range, a mountain range in British Columbia, Canada
- O K, Kentucky, US
- Oklahoma, United States postal abbreviation

== Products and companies ==
- OK FM Legaspi (DWGB), a Filipino radio station
- OK FM Naga (DZOK), a Filipino radio station
- OK Kosher Certification, a food-products certification agency
- OK Motor Services, a defunct bus and coach operator in County Durham, England
- OK Sauce, a fruity brown sauce
- OK Soda, a soft drink
- OK-Supreme, a British motorcycle manufacturer
- OKs, a cereal formerly produced by Kellogg's
- Czech Airlines (IATA code)
- Odnoklassniki, a social network service used mainly in Russia

== Sports ==
- OK (dinghy), a class of racing dinghy
- OK League, a defunct South African football league
- OK Liga, a Spanish men's rink hockey league
- OK Liga Femenina, a Spanish women's rink hockey league

== Other uses ==
- OK cells, a cell line derived from North American opossum kidney
- OK Hotel, a bar and music venue in Seattle, Washington, US
- One Kamerun, a political party in Cameroon
- O_{K}, the ring of integers of an algebraic number field K
- Czech Republic (aircraft registration prefix OK)

== See also ==
- 0K (disambiguation) (zero K)
- A-ok, a variant of "OK"
- Gunfight at the O.K. Corral
- Okay (disambiguation)
- Orenstein & Koppel (O&K), a German engineering company
- "OK OK", a song by Juliana Hatfield from Only Everything
