= Sam Michael =

Australian Formula One designer (born 1971)

- Born: Samuel David Michael; 29 April 1971 (age 55); Western Australia
- Occupations: Motor sports engineer and designer
- Years active: 1993-
- Known for: Formula One engineer and designer: (Lotus, Jordan, Williams, McLaren)

Samuel David Michael (born 29 April 1971) is an Australian motor sports engineer and designer, who held senior positions with Formula One constructors Williams and McLaren. He is currently employed by Supercar team Triple Eight Race Engineering.

== Early career ==
Michael was born in Western Australia and grew up in Canberra. After a brief stint working on Neal Bates' Toyota Celica GT-Four rally car, Michael studied mechanical engineering at the University of New South Wales with a thesis on data acquisition systems for racing cars. During his studies, Greg Siddle employed Michael on a part-time basis working on Mark Larkham's Formula Holden, so that Michael could continue his studies.

== Formula 1 ==
Michael was recruited by UK-based Lotus in 1993. After Team Lotus went bankrupt in 1994 Gary Anderson, the chief designer at Jordan Grand Prix, took Michael on to establish the team's research and development department. Michael spent two years working in the Jordan factory on data acquisition, and installed a seven-post rig for simulating suspension movement and designing an active differential.

In 1997, Michael joined the Jordan test team. In 1998 he was promoted to race engineer for Ralf Schumacher. When the German departed to go to Williams in 1999, Michael inherited Heinz-Harald Frentzen. His partnership with Frentzen was successful, resulting in a win at the French Grand Prix at Circuit de Nevers Magny-Cours, and then again at the Italian Grand Prix at Monza.

In 2001, Sir Frank Williams brought Michael to Williams as Senior Operations Engineer. He took over the responsibility of managing the engineers at races and tests. In May 2004, Michael was promoted to Technical Director of Williams, leaving Patrick Head to focus on engineering strategy.

In late 2011, Michael joined McLaren as Sporting Director, becoming part of the senior technical management team.

At McLaren, Michael came under pressure following a series of failures during pitstops, during the introduction of new equipment and procedures. Martin Whitmarsh defended Michael's position, and shortly afterwards the changes began to pay off.

== Return to Australia ==
At the end of 2014 Michael returned to Australia, after resigning from McLaren earlier that year. In mid-2016, Michael joined the Australian Institute for Motor Sport Safety board focusing on safety in motor sport. In late 2016, Michael took on a part-time mentoring role with Triple Eight Race Engineering after Ludo Lacroix moved to DJR Team Penske.

Michael was invited to become a director of the Australian Institute for Motor Sport Safety in 2016 and worked in a close involvement with safety matters.

== Role in FIA ==
In 2017, Michael became an advisor to the FIA’s Research Working Group, a body of engineers that among other tasks reviews new safety devices.

He has a seat on the FIA Single Seater Commission. In 2022, Michael was the President of the FIA Safety Commission.

== Life outside F1 ==
Michael co-founded Ox Mountain in 2015 and currently is the CEO. Ox Mountain is a machine learning company to the optimisation of maintenance in capital intensive industries, such as mining and rail.

He is a Adjunct Senior Lecturer of Economic, Business School at the University of Western Australia.
