= Suspension keel =

A suspension keel is an extension pylon to the bodywork of single-seat, open wheel racing cars designed with a raised nose cone, to allow the lower suspension arms to be attached to the car approximately parallel to the road surface. In recent years the placing and design of a suspension keel, or the lack of such, has been one of the few distinct variables in Formula One chassis design.

Traditional low nose cone designs (e.g. the McLaren MP4/4) allow the lower suspension arms to be directly attached to the main structural members of the car. However, since the move to high nose cone designs – which allow better use of airflow underneath the car, and to a lesser extent the front wing – location of these lower arms has proven problematic. For ideal suspension geometry, and hence maximum mechanical grip, the lower arms should be long and near parallel with the road. As there is no longer any structural bodywork in these low positions, extensions were developed to allow the suspension to be mounted with correct geometry. Since the advent of high nose designs in the early 1990s, pioneered on the Tyrrell 019 Formula One car, three major keel designs have emerged to solve this problem:

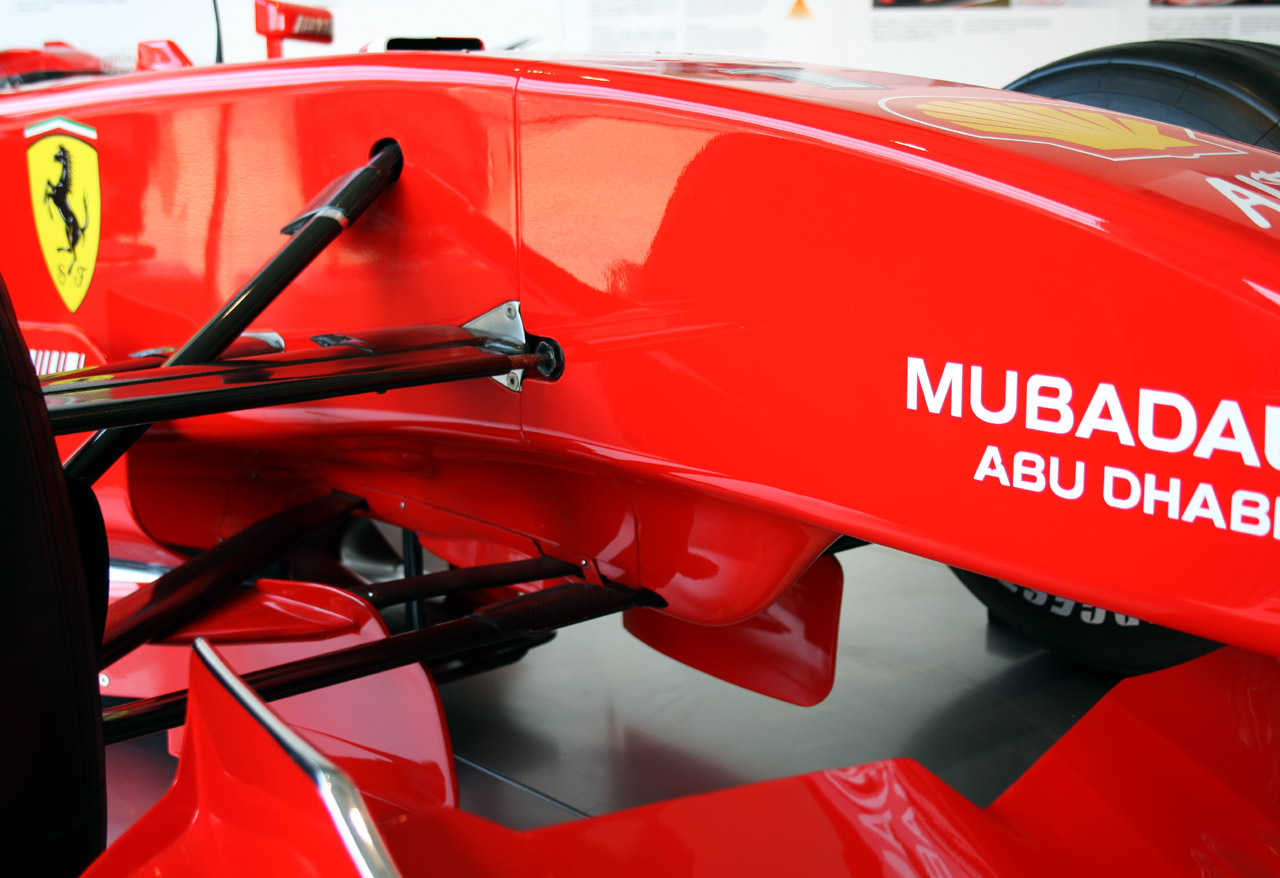
The Ferrari F2005 has a conventional single keel design in the 2000s

Single-keel: Perhaps the simplest response, utilising a single, planar extension to the ventral surface of the car's nose cone, providing a plate onto which the proximal ends of the suspension arms can be mounted. Benefits include a simple construction design, and the flexibility of having a large surface, thus allowing the suspension geometry to be altered for fine tuning. A serious hindrance in the single-keel design is that the keel itself protrudes into the underbody airflow, thus reducing the benefits of the raised nose design. As a consequence of this the single keel design fell out of favour in the late 2000s. However, for the 2010 Formula One season both the Mercedes MGP W01 and Virgin VR-01 feature single keel front suspension.

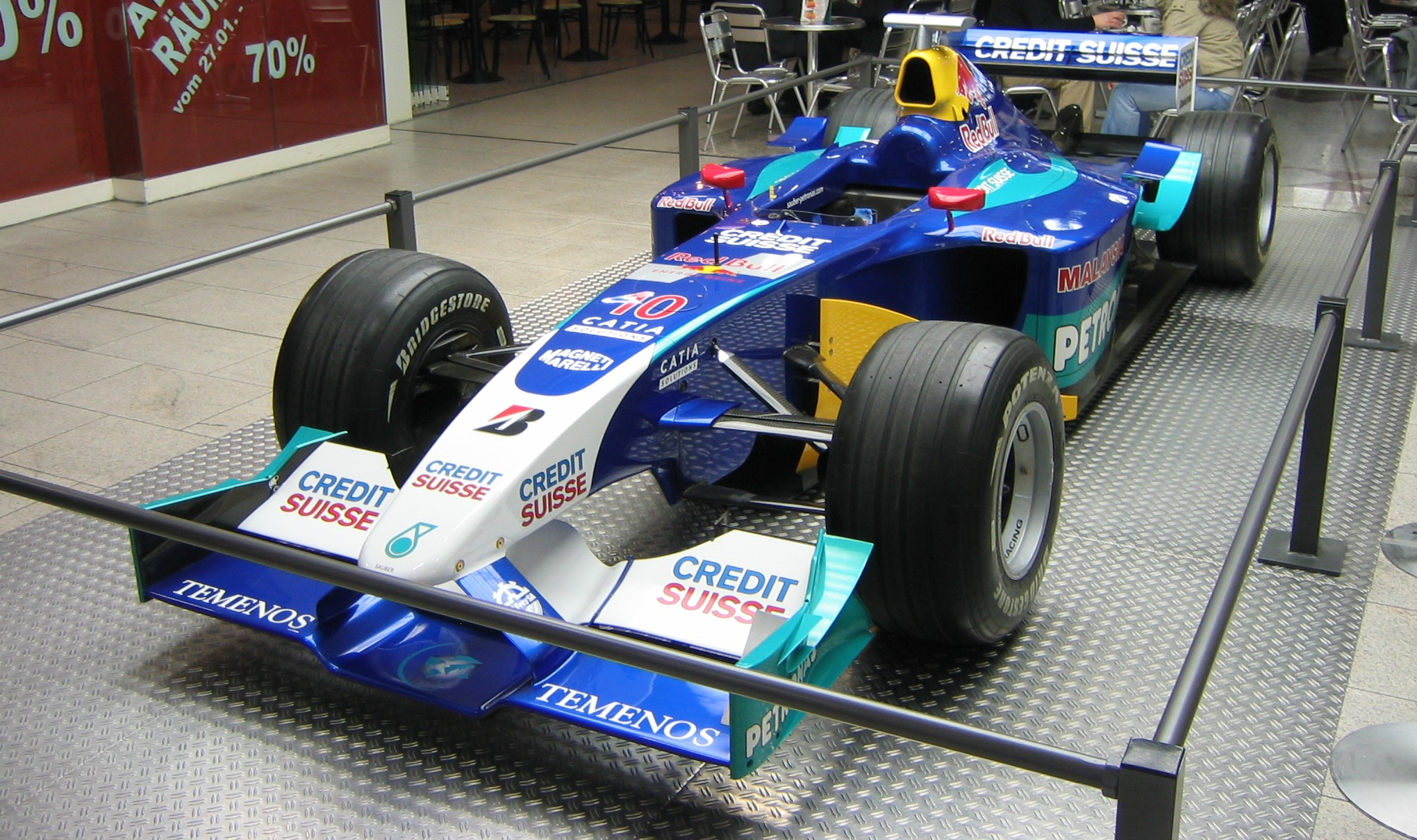
Short twin keels in use on the Sauber C22.

Twin-keel: As the name suggests, rather than one single keel, two shorter keel stubs are used. Each protrudes from the underside or lower corners of the nose cone, and the left and right suspension arms are mounted to the appropriate keel. This design reduces the disturbance to the airflow, but compromises the suspension set up and configuration flexibility, and introduces significant structural complexity and weight. The twin-keel concept was conceived by Harvey Postlethwaite during his time at Honda Racing Developments, before being introduced by Sauber during the 2000 Formula One season and swiftly copied by many other teams. In 2007, only Red Bull Racing used a twin-keel chassis.

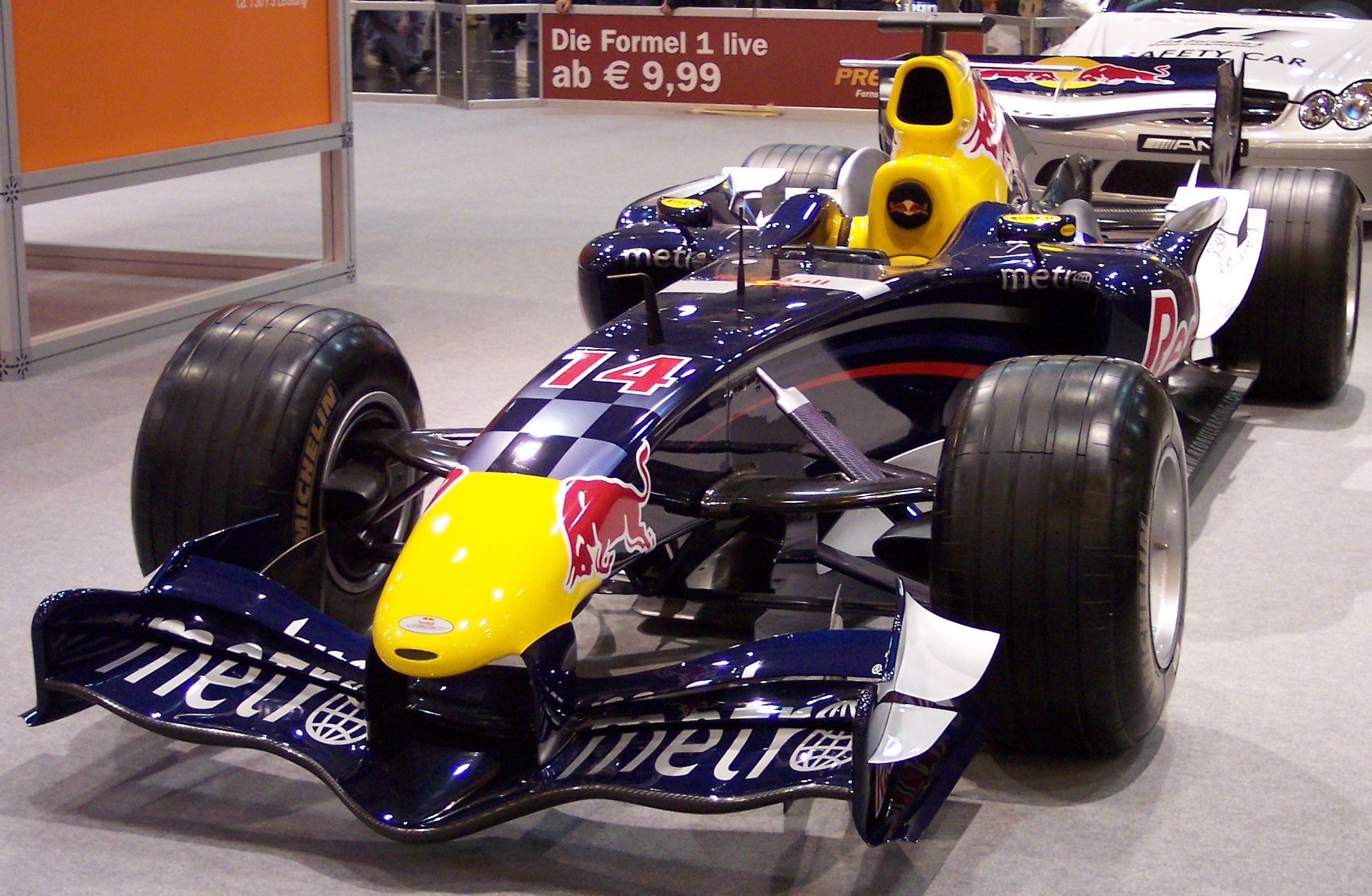
A V-keel in use on the 2006 Red Bull RB2.

V-keel: Used principally by the Renault F1 team, who introduced the design in 2005, this variant uses two keel elements protruding downward in a V shape. The tips of the elements are fused, and at this point the suspension arms are mounted. Something of a compromise position, benefits include a reduction in disturbance to the underbody airflow in comparison to a single-keel design, with fewer geometry restrictions than with twin-keels.

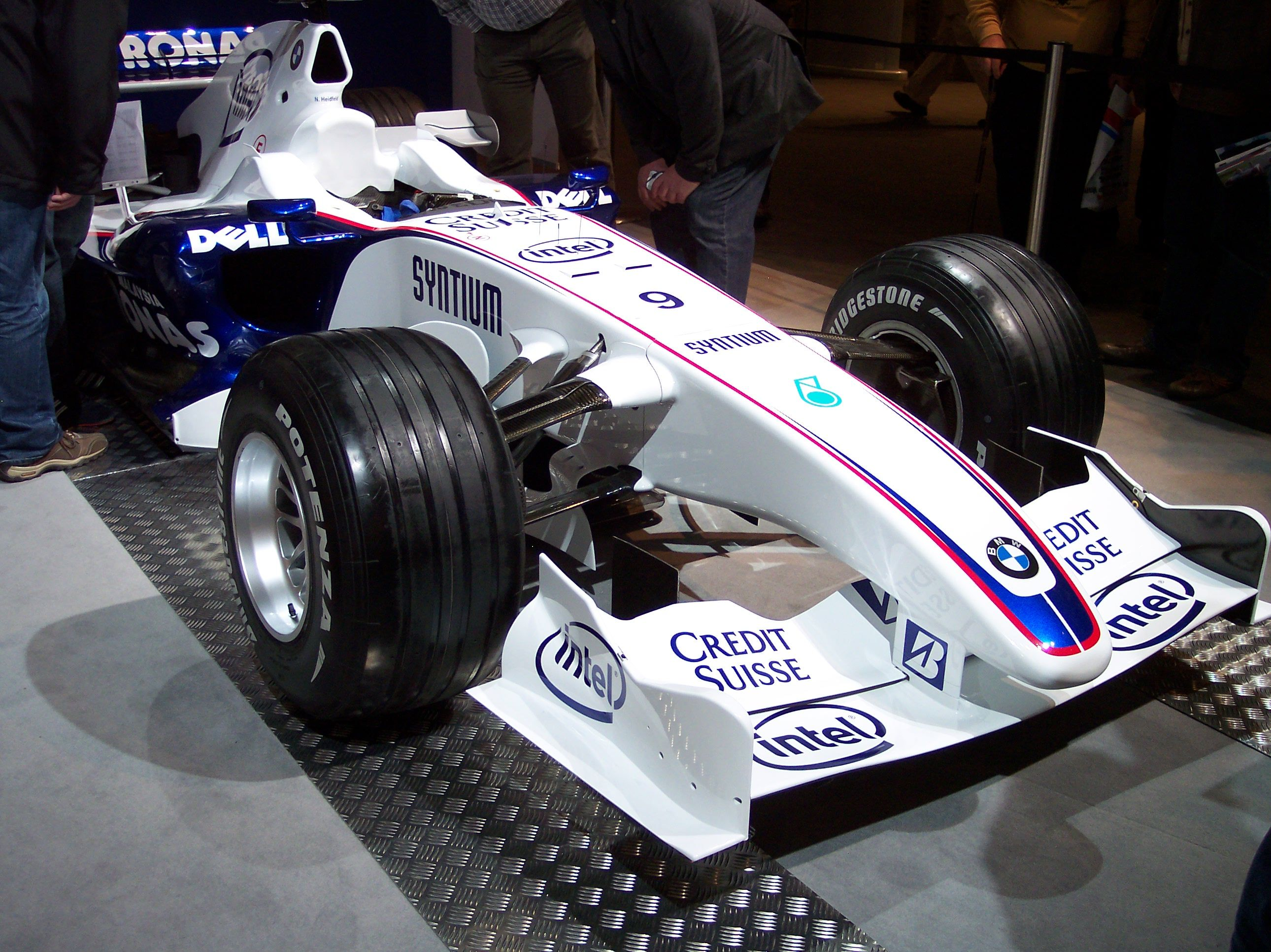
Zero keel design as employed on the BMW Sauber F1.07. Note the lower suspension arms mounted directly onto the lower edge of the nosecone, and the angle between the arms and road surface necessary for this arrangement.

One limitation of any keel design is that, while the keel influence may vary, the suspension linkages themselves still disrupt the underbody airflow. This problem was exacerbated when the FIA introduced rule changes in 2005 that forced teams to mount their front wing in a more elevated position. In response to this, many F1 teams have developed zero-keel chassis designs. Here the keel is removed entirely, and the suspension is mounted directly to the chassis. As the nose cone is in a raised position, this entails that the suspension arms take a distinctly inclined angle with respect to the road surface, reducing suspension efficiency. However, with continued restrictions to aerodynamic downforce through the use of aerofoil wings, and the lighter V8 engines specified from 2006 onwards causing weight distribution to shift forward, many designers apparently consider this drawback to be less significant than the concomitant increase in venturi downforce generated underneath the car; except for Renault and Red Bull, all of the teams in the 2007 Formula One World Championship used a zero-keel design.
