= 2009 V8 Supercar season =

Seasons
- ← 2008 2010 →

The 2009 V8 Supercar season was the thirteenth season in which V8 Supercars contested the premier Australian motor racing series for touring cars. It was the 50th season of touring car racing in Australia from the first Australian Touring Car Championship, latter to become the V8 Supercar Championship Series, and the first Armstrong 500, which would evolve into the Bathurst 1000.

The season featured the thirteenth V8 Supercar Championship Series which began on 21 March at the Clipsal 500 on the streets of Adelaide and finished on 6 December at the Homebush Street Circuit. The championship comprised 26 races held at 14 events, visiting all states and the Northern Territory of Australia as well as New Zealand. A non-championship event supported the 2009 Australian Grand Prix. The season also included the tenth second tier Development Series, promoted as the Fujitsu V8 Supercar Series, with all seven rounds held as support races for the V8 Supercar Championship Series. For the second year, a third tier series was run, as the Shannons V8 Touring Car National Series. Its five rounds were held at rounds of the Shannons Nationals Motor Racing Championships.

== Review ==
The 2009 V8 Supercar Championship Series was dominated by the season long rivalry between the leading Ford team, Triple Eight Race Engineering and its drivers Jamie Whincup and Craig Lowndes and the leading Holden team, the Holden Racing Team and its drivers, Will Davison and Garth Tander. Between them they won 22 of the seasons 26-point scoring races. HRT won most of the seasons prizes, winning the teams prize, leading the charge to Holden regaining the manufacturers prize, the drivers combining to win the Bathurst 1000 and the Phillip Island 500, but Triple Eight won the biggest prize with Jamie Whincup retaining the drivers' championship. Whincup personally won half of the 22 races the two teams won together, the backbone of his title retention with his season beginning Adelaide 500 as his centrepiece and Lowndes chipped in by dominating Winton and winning the non-championship event held on the Australian Grand Prix support program. Lowndes was fourth in the championship behind Tander, but Davison was the revelation of the season, stepping up to HRT after a strong season with Dick Johnson Racing in 2008, Davison pushed Whincup almost all the way to the title until Davison faded over the final two events at Barbagallo and the new Sydney 500.

Best of the rest was a battle between two Ford teams. Mark Winterbottom won at Surfers Paradise and finished fifth in the drivers championship for Ford Performance Racing while at Dick Johnson Racing, Steven Johnson finished sixth and his teammate James Courtney took two street circuit victories at the Townsville 400 and Sydney 500. The only upset win was Michael Caruso's debut win at Hidden Valley Raceway. Caruso's win for Garry Rogers Motorsport was also the only Holden race win not scored by the Holden Racing Team as the three top Ford team shared honours.

Ford also had success in the second tier series with MW Motorsport driver Jonathon Webb charging to the series crown, utterly dominant in the second half of the series as Ford drivers swamped the top seven positions in the development series. James Moffat was series runner up from David Russell with TV personality racer Grant Denyer putting his best ever season to finish a strong fourth position. The emerging third tier series was won strongly by Adam Wallis in his self-run Holden Commodore.

== Race calendar ==
Race title	Circuit	City / state	Date	Series	Winner	Team	Report
(South Australia) Clipsal 500	Adelaide Street Circuit	Adelaide, South Australia	19 - 22 Mar	VSC 1 VSC 2	Jamie Whincup; Jamie Whincup	Triple Eight Race Engineering; Triple Eight Race Engineering	report
(South Australia) Clipsal 500	Adelaide Street Circuit	Adelaide, South Australia	19 - 22 Mar	FVS 1	David Russell	Howard Racing	
(Victoria (state)) Sprint Gas V8 Supercars Manufacturers Challenge	Albert Park	Melbourne, Victoria	26 - 29 Mar		Craig Lowndes	Triple Eight Race Engineering	report
(New Zealand) Hamilton 400	Hamilton Street Circuit	Hamilton, New Zealand	17 - 19 Apr	VSC 3 VSC 4	Jamie Whincup; Jamie Whincup	Triple Eight Race Engineering; Triple Eight Race Engineering	report
(New South Wales) Goulburn	Wakefield Park	Goulburn, New South Wales	25 - 26 Apr	STCS 1	Adam Wallis	Warrin Mining	
(Victoria (state)) Winton	Winton Motor Raceway	Benalla, Victoria	1–3 May	VSC 5 VSC 6	Craig Lowndes; Craig Lowndes	Triple Eight Race Engineering; Triple Eight Race Engineering	report
(Victoria (state)) Winton	Winton Motor Raceway	Benalla, Victoria	1–3 May	FVS 2	Jonathon Webb	MW Motorsport	
Falken Tasmania Challenge	Symmons Plains Raceway	Launceston, Tasmania	29–31 May	VSC 7 VSC 8	Garth Tander; Jamie Whincup	Holden Racing Team; Triple Eight Race Engineering	report
(South Australia) Mallala	Mallala Motor Sport Park	Adelaide, South Australia	6 - 7 Jun	STCS 2	Adam Wallis	Warrin Mining	
(Northern Territory) Skycity Triple Crown	Hidden Valley Raceway	Darwin, Northern Territory	19 - 21 Jun	VSC 9 VSC 10	Jamie Whincup; Michael Caruso	Triple Eight Race Engineering; Garry Rogers Motorsport	report
(Victoria (state)) Winton	Winton Motor Raceway	Benalla, Victoria	27 - 28 Jun	STCS 3	Terry Wyhoon	Image Racing	
(Queensland) Dunlop Townsville 400	Townsville Street Circuit	Townsville, Queensland	10 - 12 Jul	VSC 11; VSC 12	Jamie Whincup; James Courtney	Triple Eight Race Engineering; Dick Johnson Racing	report
(Queensland) Dunlop Townsville 400	Townsville Street Circuit	Townsville, Queensland	10 - 12 Jul	FVS 3	James Moffat	Sonic Motor Racing Services	
(Victoria (state)) Norton 360 Sandown Challenge	Sandown Raceway	Melbourne, Victoria	31 Jul - 2 Aug	VSC 13; VSC 14	Will Davison; Garth Tander	Holden Racing Team; Holden Racing Team	report
(Victoria (state)) Norton 360 Sandown Challenge	Sandown Raceway	Melbourne, Victoria	31 Jul - 2 Aug	FVS 4	David Russell	Howard Racing	
Queensland House and Land.com 300	Queensland Raceway	Ipswich, Queensland	21 - 23 Aug	VSC 15; VSC 16	Jamie Whincup; Will Davison	Triple Eight Race Engineering; Holden Racing Team	report
Queensland House and Land.com 300	Queensland Raceway	Ipswich, Queensland	21 - 23 Aug	FVS 5	Jonathon Webb	MW Motorsport	
(New South Wales) Oran Park	Oran Park Raceway	Sydney, New South Wales	29 - 30 Aug	STCS 4	Shane Beikoff	Turbo Brisbane	
(Victoria (state)) L&H 500	Phillip Island Grand Prix Circuit	Phillip Island, Victoria	11 - 13 Sep	VSC 17	Garth Tander; Will Davison	Holden Racing Team	report
(New South Wales) Supercheap Auto Bathurst 1000	Mount Panorama Circuit	Bathurst, New South Wales	8 - 11 Oct	VSC 18	Garth Tander; Will Davison	Holden Racing Team	report
(New South Wales) Supercheap Auto Bathurst 1000	Mount Panorama Circuit	Bathurst, New South Wales	8 - 11 Oct	FVS 6	Jonathon Webb	MW Motorsport	
(Queensland) Gold Coast Nikon SuperGP	Surfers Paradise Street Circuit	Surfers Paradise, Queensland	22 - 25 Oct	VSC 19; VSC 20	Garth Tander; Mark Winterbottom	Holden Racing Team; Ford Performance Racing	report
(Bahrain) Desert 400	Bahrain International Circuit	Manama, Bahrain	5 - 7 Nov	VSC 21; VSC 22	event cancelled		
(Victoria (state)) The Island 300	Phillip Island Grand Prix Circuit	Phillip Island, Victoria	7 - 8 Nov	VSC 21; VSC 22	Jamie Whincup; Jamie Whincup	Triple Eight Race Engineering; Triple Eight Race Engineering	report
(Western Australia) BigPond 300	Barbagallo Raceway	Perth, Western Australia	21 - 23 Nov	VSC 23; VSC 24	Jamie Whincup; Craig Lowndes	Triple Eight Race Engineering; Triple Eight Race Engineering	report
(Victoria (state)) Sandown	Sandown Raceway	Melbourne, Victoria	28 - 29 Nov	STCS 5	Steve Owen	Power Plus 98	
(New South Wales) Sydney Telstra 500	Homebush Street Circuit	Sydney, New South Wales	4 - 6 Dec	VSC 25; VSC 26	Garth Tander; James Courtney	Holden Racing Team; Dick Johnson Racing	report
(New South Wales) Sydney Telstra 500	Homebush Street Circuit	Sydney, New South Wales	4 - 6 Dec	FVS 7	Jonathon Webb	MW Motorsport	

* - fastest lap of official pre-season test days

- VSC - V8 Supercar Championship Series
- FVS - Fujitsu V8 Supercar Series
- STCS - Shannons V8 Touring Car National Series
