= 2008 Australian Grand Prix =

786th Formula 1 Championship Grand Prix

Coordinates: 37°50′59″S 144°58′06″E

Race 1 of 18 in the 2008 Formula One World Championship
← Previous race	Next race →

Race details
- Date: 16 March 2008
- Official name: 2008 Formula 1 ING Australian Grand Prix
- Location: Melbourne Grand Prix Circuit, Melbourne, Australia
- Course: Temporary street circuit
- Course length: 5.303 km (3.295 miles)
- Distance: 58 laps, 307.574 km (191.118 miles)
- Weather: Clear, dry, air temperature of 39 °C (102 °F).
- Attendance: 108,000

Pole position
Driver	(United Kingdom) Lewis Hamilton	McLaren-Mercedes
- Time: 1:26.714

Fastest lap
Driver	(Finland) Heikki Kovalainen	McLaren-Mercedes
- Time: 1:27.418 on lap 43

Podium
First	(United Kingdom) Lewis Hamilton	McLaren-Mercedes
Second	(Germany) Nick Heidfeld	BMW Sauber
Third	(Germany) Nico Rosberg	Williams-Toyota

The 2008 Australian Grand Prix (officially known as the 2008 Formula 1 ING Australian Grand Prix) was a Formula One motor race held on 16 March 2008 at the Melbourne Grand Prix Circuit, Melbourne, Australia. It was the first race of the 2008 Formula One season. In qualifying for the event, Lewis Hamilton for the McLaren team started from pole position ahead of Robert Kubica in the BMW Sauber by 0.15 seconds.

The 58-lap race featured three safety car interruptions due to collisions on lap 1, 26, and 42. A high rate of attrition meant that only seven cars of the 22 participants finished the race, with six being classified after sixth place Rubens Barrichello was disqualified for exiting the pit lane illegally. Of the six, Hamilton lead most of the race and finished first ahead of Nick Heidfeld in second in a BMW Sauber and Nico Rosberg in third in a Williams. This was Rosberg's first podium finish. In winning the race, Hamilton and McLaren led the Drivers' Championship and Constructors Championship, respectively.

This event also marked the first race in seven years, since the 2001 San Marino Grand Prix, not to feature cars competing using traction control, which was banned by the FIA at the end of 2007. This was the lowest number of drivers to finish a Grand Prix since the 1996 Monaco Grand Prix, where only three cars finished the race, and tied the result at the 2005 United States Grand Prix, where only six cars competed due to safety issues revolving around the Michelin tyres.

== Background ==
The Grand Prix was contested on 16 March 2008 at the Melbourne Grand Prix Circuit, Melbourne, Australia by 22 drivers, in 11 teams of two. The competing teams, known as constructors, were Ferrari, McLaren-Mercedes, Renault, Honda, Force India, BMW Sauber, Toyota, Red Bull Racing, Williams, Toro Rosso and Super Aguri.

The race was the first of the 2008 Formula One season, with several teams opting to retain the same drivers as they had in 2007, however some teams changed for 2008. One of the main driver changes involved McLaren driver Fernando Alonso, who chose to move back to Renault for the 2008 season, with Heikki Kovalainen moving in the opposite direction to McLaren. The 2007 Drivers' Championship winner Kimi Räikkönen stayed at Ferrari after his title-winning campaign, with the Finnish driver again being joined by Felipe Massa. As in the previous season, the same 11 teams took to the grid for the start of the new season.

The final mass testing session before the new season took place at the Circuit de Catalunya in Montmeló, Spain between 25 and 27 February 2008. All the teams, with the exception of Super Aguri attended this three-day test which was affected by rain on the first day. On the first day of testing, Lewis Hamilton representing McLaren set the fastest lap a 1:22.276. Second was the Ferraris of Räikkönen and seven-time world champion Michael Schumacher. Hamilton continued to top the timesheets on day two with Kovalainen second. Räikkönen was third with a time of 1:21.722, having been joined at the track by his teammate Felipe Massa. Massa's best lap of 1:22.513 only made him fifth fastest, with Kazuki Nakajima in a Williams splitting the Ferraris in fourth. On the third and final day, the Toyota of Jarno Trulli finished in first place with the fastest lap of the testing weekend, recording a lap time of 1:20.801. Second was the Red Bull driver David Coulthard who missed the previous two days' running due to requiring treatment on a trapped nerve.

== Practice ==
“There are definitely four cars that are quicker than us, so we'll get our heads down this evening and work on the race information before qualifying tomorrow. It's pretty windy out on the track, but it's an issue for everyone."

— Mark Webber, after recording the second fastest lap in the second practice session.

Three practice sessions were held before the race. The first was held on Friday morning and the second on Friday afternoon - both of these sessions lasted 1 hour and 30 minutes with weather conditions dry throughout. The third session was held on Saturday morning and lasted an hour. Räikkönen, the defending champion, set the fastest time in first practice, posting a lap time of 1:26.461, four-tenths of a second quicker than Hamilton and Massa, in second and third places respectively. Heikki Kovalainen completed the top four in the McLaren, with Mark Webber in the Red Bull and Alonso in the Renault in fifth and sixth positions, two seconds off the pace. Rookie Nelson Piquet Jr. caused a brief red flag in the session, spinning off at the Ascari corner.

Hamilton lapped faster than Räikkönen in the second practice session with a time of 1:26.559. Webber was second in the Red Bull, nine-tenths of a second behind Hamilton. Coulthard, Webber's teammate, was fifth, three-tenths behind Kovalainen, who finished the session fourth. The Ferraris were third and sixth; Massa in 3rd and Kimi Räikkönen in sixth. Jarno Trulli in the Toyota and Nico Rosberg in the Williams completed the top eight positions. In preparation for the qualifying session, many teams put their cars on soft tyres for the third practice session. The soft tyre gives better performance than the harder type of tyre but is less durable than the harder compound. The BMW Sauber team topped the third practice session with first and second positions with Robert Kubica finishing the session ahead of teammate Nick Heidfeld. Alonso was third in the Renault, with Rosberg in fourth.

== Qualifying ==
"I am pleased to qualify third, but there is still room for improvement. It was a fairly smooth lap, and the balance of the car felt good. At the end I didn’t nail a perfect lap, but throughout the weekend I have just been taking things steady, not making any mistakes and keep pushing harder and harder. Last year I didn’t make the best start to the season, so today’s result is a great beginning to my career as a Vodafone McLaren Mercedes driver."

— Heikki Kovalainen, commenting on his qualifying performance.

Qualifying for the race was split into three stages. The first stage of qualifying ran for 20 minutes with cars finishing in the last six positions not progressing to the next stage and retaining their position for the race. The second stage saw the next six slowest drivers not progress similarly and lasted for 15 minutes. The final stage of qualifying determined the positions from first to tenth with the fastest racer gaining pole position.

Hamilton won his seventh career pole position, with a time of 1:26.714 in the third session. Second was Kubica, who was a tenth of a second behind Hamilton. Kovalainen was third, with Massa fourth, four-tenths slower than Hamilton in the third stage. Heidfeld, Trulli, Rosberg and Coulthard completed the top eight positions. In contrast to Massa's fourth place, his teammate, Räikkönen finished qualifying in 16th place. His Ferrari car suffered a fuel pump problem at the end of stage one, with the Ferrari team unable to fix the problem before the second session. Webber in the Red Bull and Sebastian Vettel in the Toro Rosso also suffered problems, with Webber spinning off in session two due to brake failure, leaving him down in 15th. Vettel was scheduled to be in the third session, but his Toro Rosso suffered oil pump failure, preventing him from setting a time in the session. Timo Glock in a Toyota finished qualifying in ninth position, however, he was demoted to 19th after being given two five-place grid penalties. His first five-place penalty was a result of a gearbox change, while his second five-place penalty was for impeding Webber during the session. Adrian Sutil spun and stalled during his final hot lap in first qualifying and damaged his chassis.

=== Qualifying classification ===
Pos	No	Driver	Constructor	Part 1	Part 2	Part 3	Grid
1	22	(United Kingdom) Lewis Hamilton	McLaren-Mercedes	1:26.572	1:25.187	1:26.714	1
2	4	(Poland) Robert Kubica	BMW Sauber	1:26.103	1:25.315	1:26.869	2
3	23	(Finland) Heikki Kovalainen	McLaren-Mercedes	1:25.664	1:25.452	1:27.079	3
4	2	(Brazil) Felipe Massa	Ferrari	1:25.994	1:25.691	1:27.178	4
5	3	(Germany) Nick Heidfeld	BMW Sauber	1:25.960	1:25.518	1:27.236	5
6	11	(Italy) Jarno Trulli	Toyota	1:26.427	1:26.101	1:28.527	6
7	7	(Germany) Nico Rosberg	Williams-Toyota	1:26.295	1:26.059	1:28.687	7
8	9	(United Kingdom) David Coulthard	Red Bull-Renault	1:26.381	1:26.063	1:29.041	8
9	12	(Germany) Timo Glock	Toyota	1:26.919	1:26.164	1:29.593	18^{1}
10	15	(Germany) Sebastian Vettel	Toro Rosso-Ferrari	1:26.702	1:25.842	No time^{2}	9
11	17	(Brazil) Rubens Barrichello	Honda	1:26.369	1:26.173		10
12	5	(Spain) Fernando Alonso	Renault	1:26.907	1:26.188		11
13	16	(United Kingdom) Jenson Button	Honda	1:26.712	1:26.259		12
14	8	(Japan) Kazuki Nakajima	Williams-Toyota	1:26.891	1:26.413		13
15	10	(Australia) Mark Webber	Red Bull-Renault	1:26.914	No time^{3}		14
16	1	(Finland) Kimi Räikkönen	Ferrari	1:26.140	No time^{4}		15
17	21	(Italy) Giancarlo Fisichella	Force India-Ferrari	1:27.207			16
18	14	(France) Sébastien Bourdais	Toro Rosso-Ferrari	1:27.446			17
19	20	(Germany) Adrian Sutil	Force India-Ferrari	1:27.859			19
20	18	(Japan) Takuma Sato	Super Aguri-Honda	1:28.208			20
21	6	(Brazil) Nelson Piquet Jr.	Renault	1:28.330			21
22	19	(United Kingdom) Anthony Davidson	Super Aguri-Honda	1:29.059			22

Notes

- ^1 – Timo Glock was demoted to 19th place due to two five-place grid penalties, for a gearbox change and for impeding Webber during qualifying.
- ^2 – Sebastian Vettel suffered an oil pump problem and did not take part in Q3.
- ^3 – Mark Webber suffered a right front brake failure and was unable to continue with the session after spinning into the gravel.
- ^4 – Kimi Räikkönen suffered a fuel pressure problem in Q1 and was barred from the rest of session for stopping on-track.

== Race ==
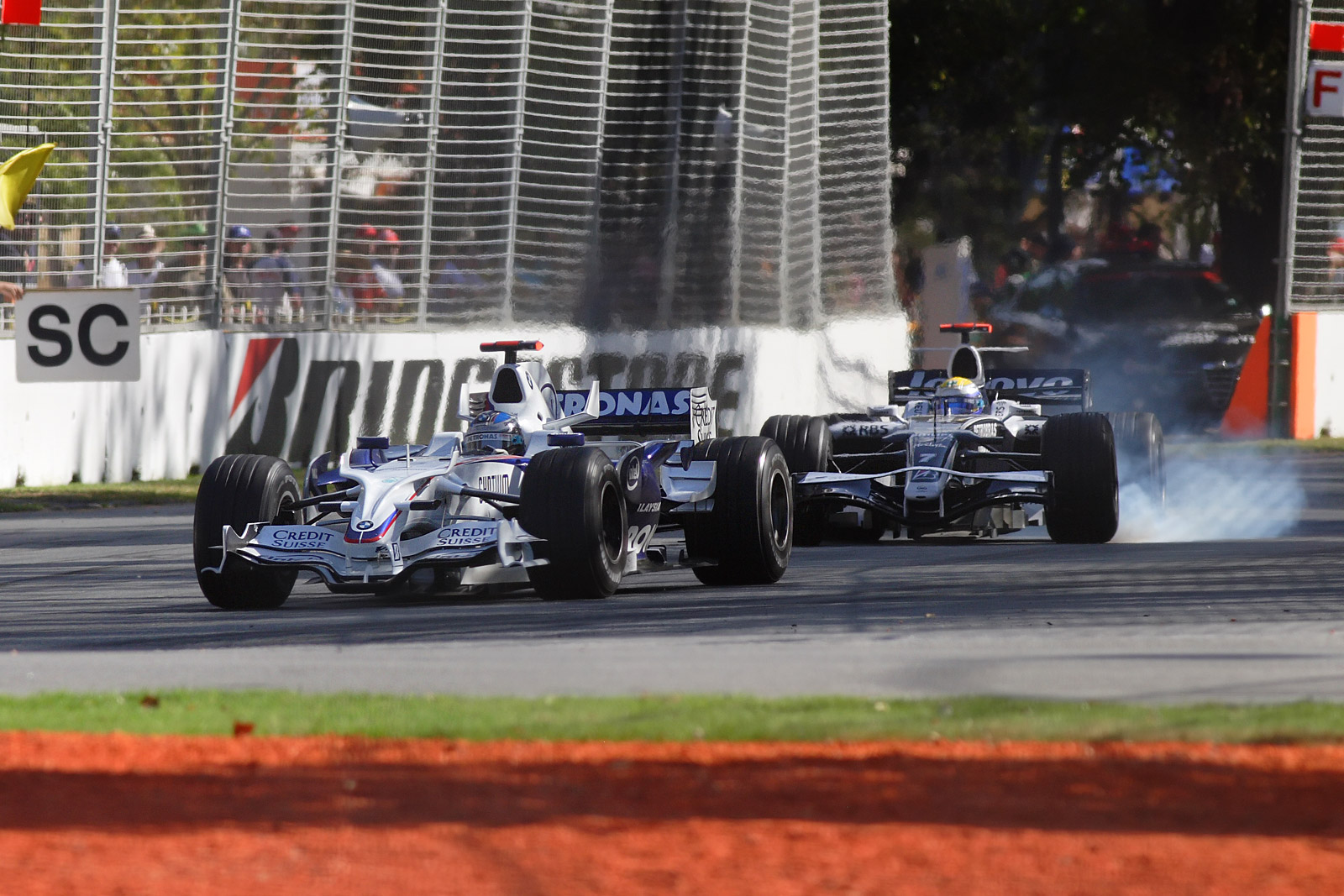
Nick Heidfeld finished second followed by Nico Rosberg in third. The two are here seen during one of the Safety car periods.

The conditions for the race were dry with the air temperature 37 °C (99 °F). The race started at 15:30 AEDT (GMT +10). Hamilton, from pole position on the grid, held onto the lead into the first corner with Kubica behind in second position. Vettel stalled on the grid and therefore pulled away very slowly, and lost several positions in the process. Behind the leading two, Massa spun coming out of turn one whilst racing Kovalainen, and damaged his front wing against the barriers. Nelson Piquet Jr. made contact with Giancarlo Fisichella at the first corner forcing Fisichella to retire from the race. At turn three Mark Webber, Anthony Davidson, Jenson Button and Sebastian Vettel made contact and all had to retire. Following the collision, Kazuki Nakajima drove into Vettel as he spun and lost his front wing and had to pit in for a new one. A safety car was deployed in response to the accidents.

By the end of the first lap, Lewis Hamilton retained his lead followed by Kubica and Rosberg. Kimi Räikkönen elevated himself from fifteenth to eighth on the first lap. After the safety car was left the race on lap three, Räikkönen was stuck behind Rubens Barrichello, finally passing him lap 19 for sixth place. Sutil retired with hydraulic failure on lap 10. During the first set of pit stops Toyota driver Jarno Trulli was forced to retire due to electrical problems. On lap 26, Massa attempted to pass David Coulthard with the two colliding forcing Coulthard to retire, and later Massa retired with an engine failure three laps later. Both Massa and Coulthard suggested the collision was the others fault. This led to a second safety car being deployed. With other cars pitting, Räikkönen decided to stay out to move up the order.

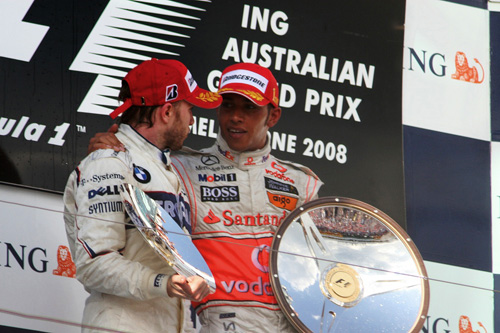
Lewis Hamilton and Nick Heidfeld, who finished first and second, on the podium after the race.

The race restarted without a safety car on lap 30 and Räikkönen made an ambitious move on Heikki Kovalainen on turn 3, but went into the gravel trap and lost several places. Twelve laps later he spun the car again whilst attempting to pass Timo Glock into the same corner. Sato retired on lap 34 due to a transmission problem. Timo Glock ran wide onto the grass on lap 44 and the bottom of his car hit two substantial bumps, the second of which caused it to briefly fly up in the air and land with force sufficient to break the Suspension. Glock spun twice and came to rest against the wall further down the track. He was forced to retire and the safety car came out for a third time. On the same lap, due to a false signal from the chief mechanic, Barrichello left a pit stop before the fuel hose had been removed from his car. Several mechanics suffered minor injuries. He would also serve a ten-second stop and go penalty as the pit stop was taken while the pit lane was closed.

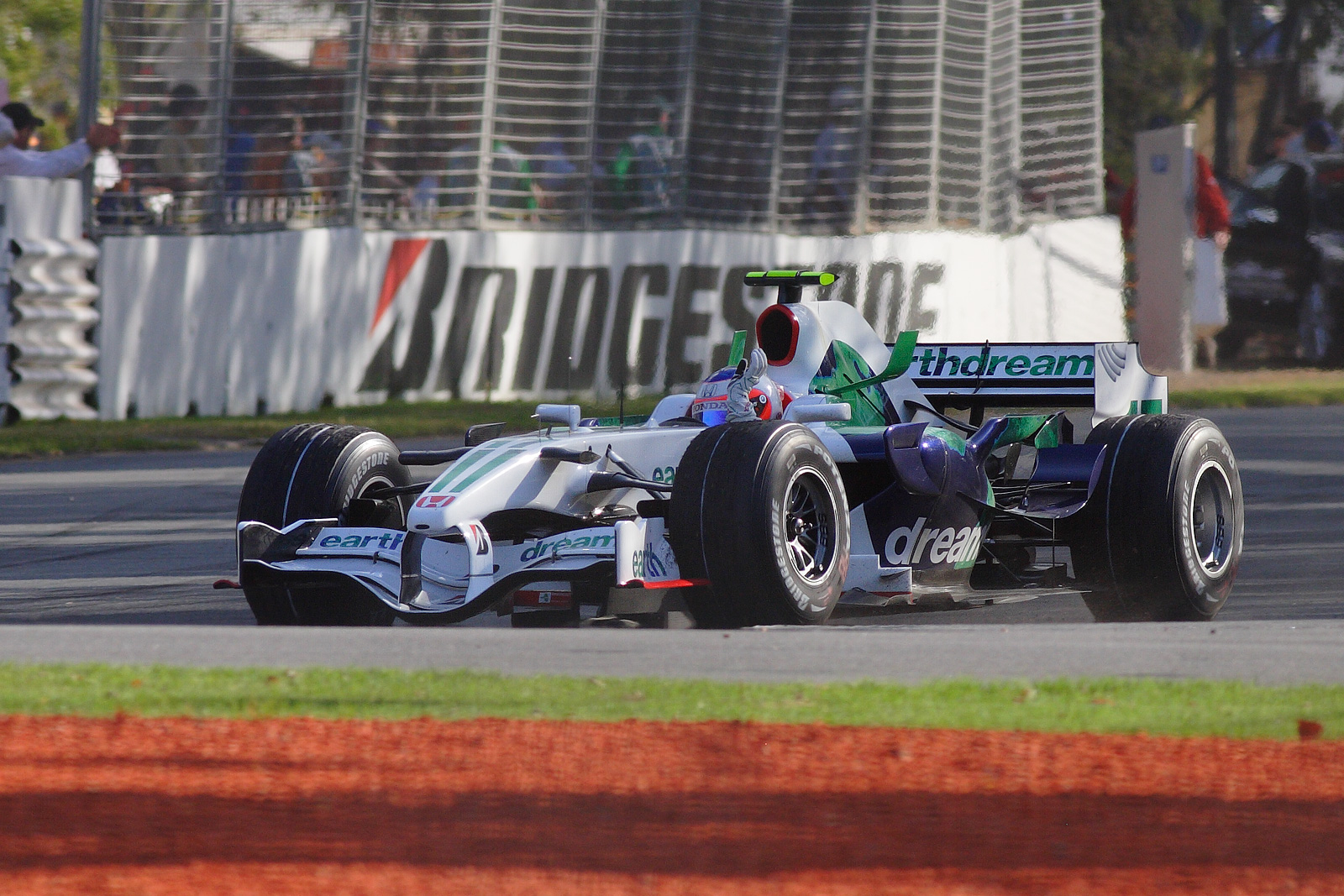
Rubens Barrichello (pictured at the event) finished sixth but was later disqualified

The race restarted on lap 47 and one lap later Kubica was forced out of the race after a collision with Kazuki Nakajima. Fernando Alonso was able to move up the field as a result of the high number of retirements and overtaking of Kovalainen and Räikkönen in a single move and was fifth with eight laps left. Räikkönen retired with Ferrari's second engine failure of the race on lap 54, after driving slowly into the pit lane. Sébastien Bourdais was competing in his first Formula One race, but it ended on lap 56 after suffering an engine failure from fourth position. At the end of the penultimate lap, Kovalainen passed Alonso coming out of turn 13 to take fourth place, but moments later on the pit straight he accidentally hit the speed limiter designed for use in the pit lane allowing Alonso to regain fourth position.

Seven cars finished the race but Barrichello was later disqualified for passing a red light at the pit lane exit. Lewis Hamilton won the race having led all but 5 laps during pit stops. Nick Heidfeld finished second and Nico Rosberg recorded his first podium in third and for Williams, the first since the 2007 Canadian Grand Prix. Kazuki Nakajima was the final car to finish, but was later given a ten-place grid penalty for the 2008 Malaysian Grand Prix, the next race, after making contact with Kubica under safety car conditions. Bourdais, in his debut scored two championship points, despite not finishing the race, and classified seventh.

=== Race classification ===
Pos	No	Driver	Constructor	Lap	Time/Retired	Grid	Points
1	22	(United Kingdom) Lewis Hamilton	McLaren-Mercedes	58	1:34:50.616	1	10
2	3	(Germany) Nick Heidfeld	BMW Sauber	58	+5.478	5	8
3	7	(Germany) Nico Rosberg	Williams-Toyota	58	+8.163	7	6
4	5	(Spain) Fernando Alonso	Renault	58	+17.181	11	5
5	23	(Finland) Heikki Kovalainen	McLaren-Mercedes	58	+18.014	3	4
6	8	(Japan) Kazuki Nakajima	Williams-Toyota	57	+1 lap	13	3
7^{2}	14	(France) Sébastien Bourdais	Toro Rosso-Ferrari	55	Engine	17	2
8^{2}	1	(Finland) Kimi Räikkönen	Ferrari	53	Engine	15	1
Ret	4	(Poland) Robert Kubica	BMW Sauber	47	Collision	2	
Ret	12	(Germany) Timo Glock	Toyota	43	Accident	18	
Ret	18	(Japan) Takuma Sato	Super Aguri-Honda	32	Transmission	19	
Ret	6	(Brazil) Nelson Piquet Jr.	Renault	30	Collision damage	20	
Ret	2	(Brazil) Felipe Massa	Ferrari	29	Engine	4	
Ret	9	(United Kingdom) David Coulthard	Red Bull-Renault	25	Collision	8	
Ret	11	(Italy) Jarno Trulli	Toyota	19	Electrical	6	
Ret	20	(Germany) Adrian Sutil	Force India-Ferrari	8	Hydraulics	PL^{1}	
Ret	10	(Australia) Mark Webber	Red Bull-Renault	0	Collision	14	
Ret	16	(United Kingdom) Jenson Button	Honda	0	Collision	12	
Ret	19	(United Kingdom) Anthony Davidson	Super Aguri-Honda	0	Collision	21	
Ret	15	(Germany) Sebastian Vettel	Toro Rosso-Ferrari	0	Collision	9	
Ret	21	(Italy) Giancarlo Fisichella	Force India-Ferrari	0	Collision	16	
DSQ^{3}	17	(Brazil) Rubens Barrichello	Honda	58	Ignored red light	10	

Notes

- ^1 – Adrian Sutil started the race from the pitlane after he was forced to change chassis after severe damage during qualifying.
- ^2 – Sébastien Bourdais was classified as 7th and Kimi Räikkönen was classified as 8th, because they completed 90% of the race winner's distance.
- ^3 – Rubens Barrichello was disqualified from 6th for ignoring a red light at the pit exit.

== Post-race ==
"Shortly after we called Rubens in for the second of two planned pit stops, Timo Glock had a crash and the safety car was deployed. We had no alternative but to continue to bring him in because he was out of fuel, although we realised that the pit lane was going to be closed due to the safety car and that this would result in a ten-second stop-go penalty. During the pit stop the lollipop was lifted just a fraction early while the fuel hose was just coming off the car. After the pit stop Rubens exited the pit lane when the lights were still red and obviously this is in breach of the regulations. A tough set of circumstances after an otherwise very committed drive by Rubens."

— Ross Brawn, team principal of the Honda team.

In a post-race press conference, Hamilton commented on the race: "I felt fantastic. I never thought it would have been as physically a breeze as it was. It is great preparation for Malaysia so bring it on, I am really looking forward to it." He also commended the work of his McLaren team on both his scheduled stops on laps 18 and 43 respectively:

Heidfeld picked up his first podium since the 2007 Hungarian Grand Prix and was relieved to have kept Rosberg behind him, believing that his fellow German was fuelled longer than he actually was. He commented that Rosberg "came in earlier than expected on the same lap as myself. What we lost at the start we regained on the pit-stop, so our pit-stop crew, just did a fantastic job to just get me out ahead of [Rosberg]. Then I was lucky on the pit-stops in terms of the safety car." Rosberg was delighted at his first podium finish, and was looking towards the rest of the year for similar results saying "I think we have a solid car to start the season with. I am hoping to have a nice development through the season and I think we can have a good year.

Also after the race, Nakajima received a ten-place grid penalty to be applicated in the following race in Malaysia, having collided with Kubica on lap 48 of the race. As this was the first race of the season, Hamilton led the Drivers' Championship with 10 points, followed by Heidfeld on 8 and Rosberg on 6. Meanwhile in the Constructors' Championship, McLaren picked up 14 points thanks to Hamilton's win and Kovalainen's fifth place, thus giving them a five point lead over Williams – their highest championship position since 2004 – who, like McLaren, had both drivers finish in the points, with BMW Sauber in third on 8.

== Championship standings after the race ==
Drivers' Championship standings

Pos.	Driver	Points
1	(United Kingdom) Lewis Hamilton	10
2	(Germany) Nick Heidfeld	8
3	(Germany) Nico Rosberg	6
4	(Spain) Fernando Alonso	5
5	(Finland) Heikki Kovalainen	4

Constructors' Championship standings

Pos.	Constructor	Points
1	(United Kingdom) McLaren-Mercedes	14
2	(United Kingdom) Williams-Toyota	9
3	(Germany) BMW Sauber	8
4	(France) Renault	5
5	(Italy) Toro Rosso-Ferrari	2

- Note: Only the top five positions are included for both sets of standings.

== See also ==
- 2008 V8 Supercars Manufacturers Challenge

Previous race: 2007 Brazilian Grand Prix	FIA Formula One World Championship; 2008 season	Next race: 2008 Malaysian Grand Prix
Previous race: 2007 Australian Grand Prix	Australian Grand Prix	Next race: 2009 Australian Grand Prix
