= 2009 Sprint Gas V8 Supercars Manufacturers Challenge =

Motor racing event

(Victoria (state)) 2009 Sprint Gas V8 Supercars Manufacturers Challenge
Event Information
- Date: 26–29 March 2009
- Location: Melbourne, Victoria
- Venue: Melbourne Grand Prix Circuit
- Weather: Fine

Results
Race 1
Distance	15 laps	80 km
Pole position	Craig Lowndes; Triple Eight Race Engineering	1:57.7400
Winner	Craig Lowndes; Triple Eight Race Engineering	29:53.5736
Race 2
Distance	15 laps	80 km
Winner	Mark Winterbottom; Ford Performance Racing	31:54.3485
Race 3
Distance	15 laps	80 km
Winner	Craig Lowndes; Triple Eight Race Engineering	30:02.1388
Round Results
First	Craig Lowndes; Triple Eight Race Engineering	286 pts
Second	Mark Winterbottom; Ford Performance Racing	284 pts
Third	Will Davison; Holden Racing Team	258 pts

The 2009 Sprint Gas V8 Supercars Manufacturers Challenge was the second meeting of the 2009 V8 Supercar season. It was held on the weekend of 26 to 29 March at Albert Park Street Circuit, in the inner suburbs of Melbourne, the capital of Victoria. The meeting was a non-championship affair, conducted under a unique Holden vs Ford format. It was the lead support category for the 2009 Australian Grand Prix.

== Qualifying ==
Qualifying was held on Thursday 26 March.

== Top Ten shootout ==
The top ten shootout was held on Friday 27 March immediately before the first race. Craig Lowndes held onto the fastest position from qualifying, setting a new practice record while doing so. Will Davison was second fastest ahead of Jason Richards while the big mover from qualifying was Mark Winterbottom climbing from ninth to fourth, while second fastest from qualifying, the surprising Fabian Coulthard dropped to eighth.

== Race 1 ==
Race 1 was held on Friday 27 March immediately after the shootout.

== Race 2 ==
Race 2 was held on Saturday 28 March.

== Race 3 ==
Race 3 was held on Sunday 29 March.

== Results ==
Results as follows:

=== Race 1 results ===
Pos	No	Name	Team	Laps	Time/Retired	Grid	Points
1	888	Craig Lowndes	Triple Eight Race Engineering	15	29:53.5736	1	100
2	5	Mark Winterbottom	Ford Performance Racing	15	+5.8s	8	92
3	22	Will Davison	Holden Racing Team	15	+9.5s	2	86
4	17	Steven Johnson	Dick Johnson Racing	15	+10.0s	7	80
5	8	Jason Richards	Brad Jones Racing	15	+10.5s	3	74
6	111	Fabian Coulthard	Paul Cruickshank Racing	15	+15.3s	8	68
7	1	Jamie Whincup	Triple Eight Race Engineering	15	+18.4s	19	64
8	9	Shane van Gisbergen	Stone Brothers Racing	15	+18.9s	10	60
9	7	Todd Kelly	Kelly Racing	15	+21.9s	5	56
10	10	Paul Dumbrell	Walkinshaw Racing	15	+22.5s	9	52
11	14	Cameron McConville	Brad Jones Racing	15	+25.4s	14	48
12	77	Marcus Marshall	Team IntaRacing	15	+27.5s	15	46
13	25	Jason Bright	Britek Motorsport	15	+30.9s	20	44
14	3	Jason Bargwanna	Sprint Gas Racing	15	+39.7s	25	42
15	18	James Courtney	Dick Johnson Racing	15	+40.1s	26	40
16	55	Tony D'Alberto	Rod Nash Racing	15	+40.9s	23	38
17	24	David Reynolds	Walkinshaw Racing	15	+41.5s	18	36
18	6	Steven Richards	Ford Performance Racing	15	+41.8s	11	34
19	11	Jack Perkins	Kelly Racing	15	+45.0s	27	32
20	51	Greg Murphy	Sprint Gas Racing	15	+48.8s	13	30
21	9	Alex Davison	Stone Brothers Racing	15	+49.5s	21	28
22	67	Tim Slade	Paul Morris Motorsport	15	+56.3s	24	26
23	021	Dean Fiore	Team Kiwi Racing	15	+57.3s	28	24
24	34	Michael Caruso	Garry Rogers Motorsport	14	+1 lap	17	22
25	33	Lee Holdsworth	Garry Rogers Motorsport	14	+1 lap	22	20
DNF	2	Garth Tander	Holden Racing Team	13		5	
DNF	15	Rick Kelly	Kelly Racing	6		12	
DNF	39	Russell Ingall	Paul Morris Motorsport	5		16	
DNF	16	Dale Wood	Kelly Racing	4		30	
DSQ	333	Michael Patrizi	Paul Cruickshank Racing			29	

== See also ==
2009 Australian Grand Prix
