= 2009 Malaysian Grand Prix =

Coordinates: 2°45′39″N 101°44′18″E

Race 2 of 17 in the 2009 Formula One World Championship
← Previous race	Next race →

Race details
- Date: 5 April 2009
- Official name: 2009 Formula 1 Petronas Malaysian Grand Prix
- Location: Sepang International Circuit; Sepang, Selangor, Malaysia
- Course: Permanent racing facility
- Course length: 5.543 km (3.444 miles)
- Distance: 31 laps, 171.833 km (106.772 miles)
- Scheduled distance: 56 laps, 310.408 km (192.879 miles)
- Weather: Dry start, with heavy rain and thunderstorm/monsoon later
- Attendance: 97,368 (Weekend)

Pole position
Driver	(United Kingdom) Jenson Button	Brawn-Mercedes
- Time: 1.35.181

Fastest lap
Driver	(United Kingdom) Jenson Button	Brawn-Mercedes
- Time: 1:36.641 on lap 18

Podium
First	(United Kingdom) Jenson Button	Brawn-Mercedes
Second	(Germany) Nick Heidfeld	BMW Sauber
Third	(Germany) Timo Glock	Toyota

The 2009 Malaysian Grand Prix (formally the 2009 Formula 1 Petronas Malaysian Grand Prix) was a Formula One motor race held on 5 April 2009 at the Sepang International Circuit in Sepang, Malaysia. It was the second race of the 2009 FIA Formula One World Championship. The race was due to be contested over 56 laps but was stopped after 31 laps due to torrential rain. Jenson Button, driving for the Brawn GP team, was declared the winner, having started from pole position. Nick Heidfeld was classified second for BMW Sauber with Timo Glock third for Toyota.

As the race did not reach the required 75% distance (42 laps) for full points to be awarded, half-points were given instead, for only the fifth time in Formula One history and the first since the 1991 Australian Grand Prix and the last for 12 years until the 2021 Belgian Grand Prix. The race distance of 171.833 km (106.772 mi) was the fifth-shortest ever covered in a World Championship Grand Prix. Brawn GP became only the second constructor to win their first two World Championship Grands Prix since Alfa Romeo won the first two ever, in 1950.

== Report ==
=== Background ===
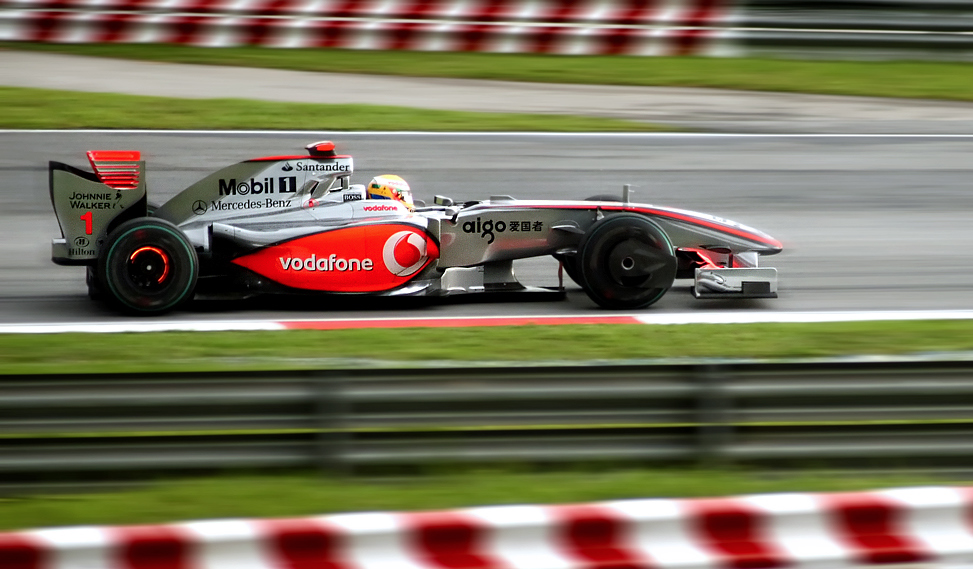
On the Thursday before the race, Lewis Hamilton was disqualified from the preceding Australian Grand Prix for misleading the stewards.

After winning the season-opening Australian Grand Prix held one week earlier, Jenson Button led the Drivers' Championship by two points from his teammate Rubens Barrichello and by four points from Jarno Trulli. Trulli's teammate Timo Glock was fourth and Fernando Alonso completed the top five. Brawn GP led the Constructors' Championship by 7 points from Toyota and by 14 points from Renault. Williams and Toro Rosso were fourth and fifth.

The race start time was moved forward two hours, from 17:00 local time (09:00 UTC) to 15:00 local time (07:00 UTC). However, the organisers turned down the possibility of holding a night race, in line with the 2008 Singapore Grand Prix, for budgetary reasons.

=== Practice and qualifying ===
"This morning we had a problem with the KERS, which cost us a bit of time, but we managed to make up for most of it in the afternoon. We had felt that the situation here could be different to Melbourne, but it is still too early to say where we are up against the opposition. What we can be sure of is that when the car runs trouble-free, we are competitive. We hope we can do a good job in tomorrow's qualifying."

— Kimi Räikkönen, after his incident in the first practice session, and after setting the fastest lap in the second practice session.

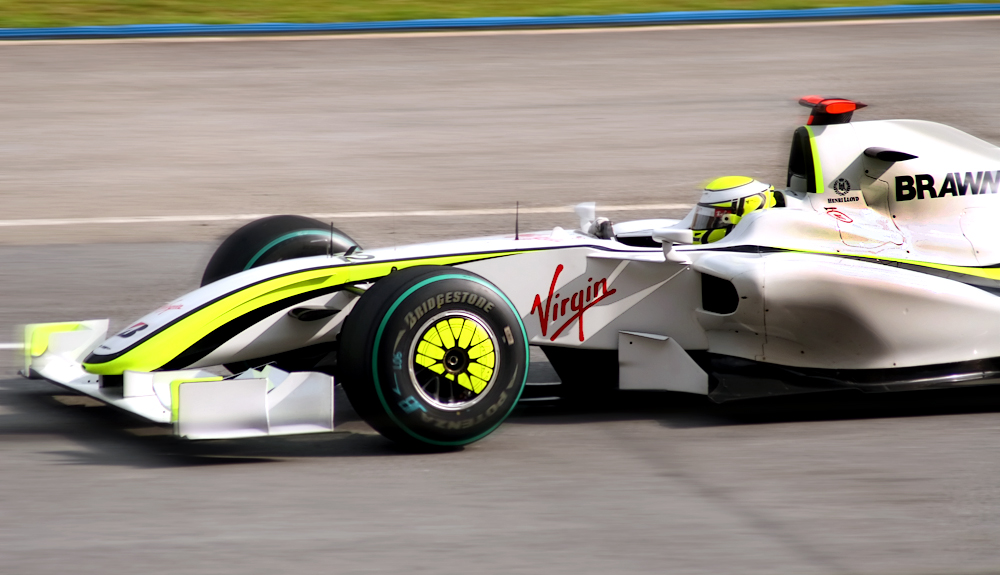
Jenson Button took his second pole position of the season for Brawn GP.

Three practice sessions were held before the race; the first was held on Friday morning and the second on Friday afternoon. Both sessions lasted 1 hour and 30 minutes with weather conditions dry throughout. The third session was held on Saturday morning and lasted an hour, and was also dry throughout. Nico Rosberg and Kazuki Nakajima secured a Williams one-two in the first session with times of 1:36.260 and 1:36.305 minutes respectively. In the second session, Ferrari's Kimi Räikkönen and Felipe Massa went quickest with times of 1:35.707 and 1:35.832 minutes. After 18 laps, Räikkönen's cockpit began to billow out smoke, and though Ferrari did not give an official statement, there are reports that the car's kinetic energy recovery system (KERS) had overheated.

Jenson Button took Brawn's second consecutive pole ahead of Jarno Trulli's Toyota. Rubens Barrichello qualified fourth in the other Brawn (third when Vettel's penalty was taken into consideration), but was demoted five places to eighth after a gearbox change. An error in strategy meant that Massa failed to make it through Q1. In an interview to Rede Globo, the driver said that he and the team thought the initial time posted was enough to qualify for the second session, and refrained from recording additional times to spare the car's engine. However, this was not the case, and Massa was left in 16th place.

=== Race ===
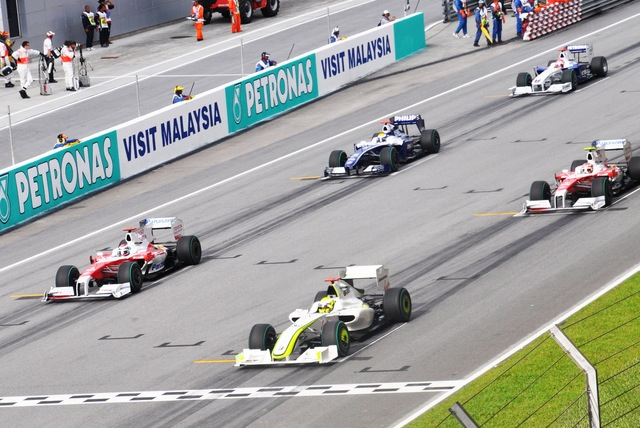
Jenson Button took pole position on the starting grid, but Nico Rosberg (in fourth place) made the best start and led for the first time in his career, into the first corner.

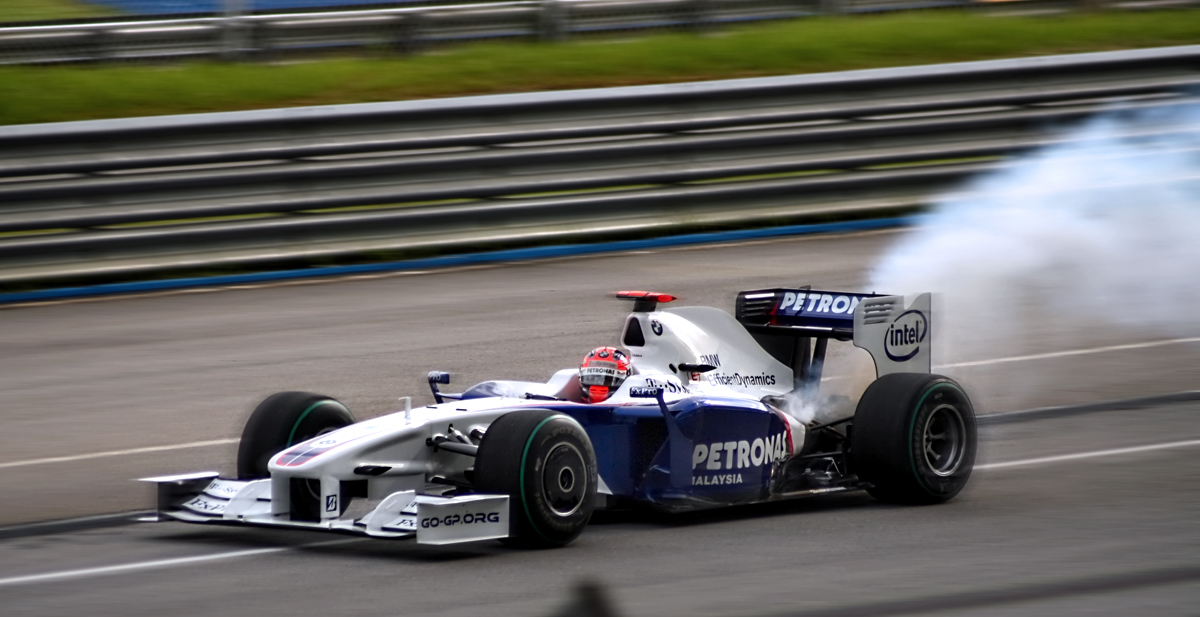
Robert Kubica retired on the second lap when his engine failed.

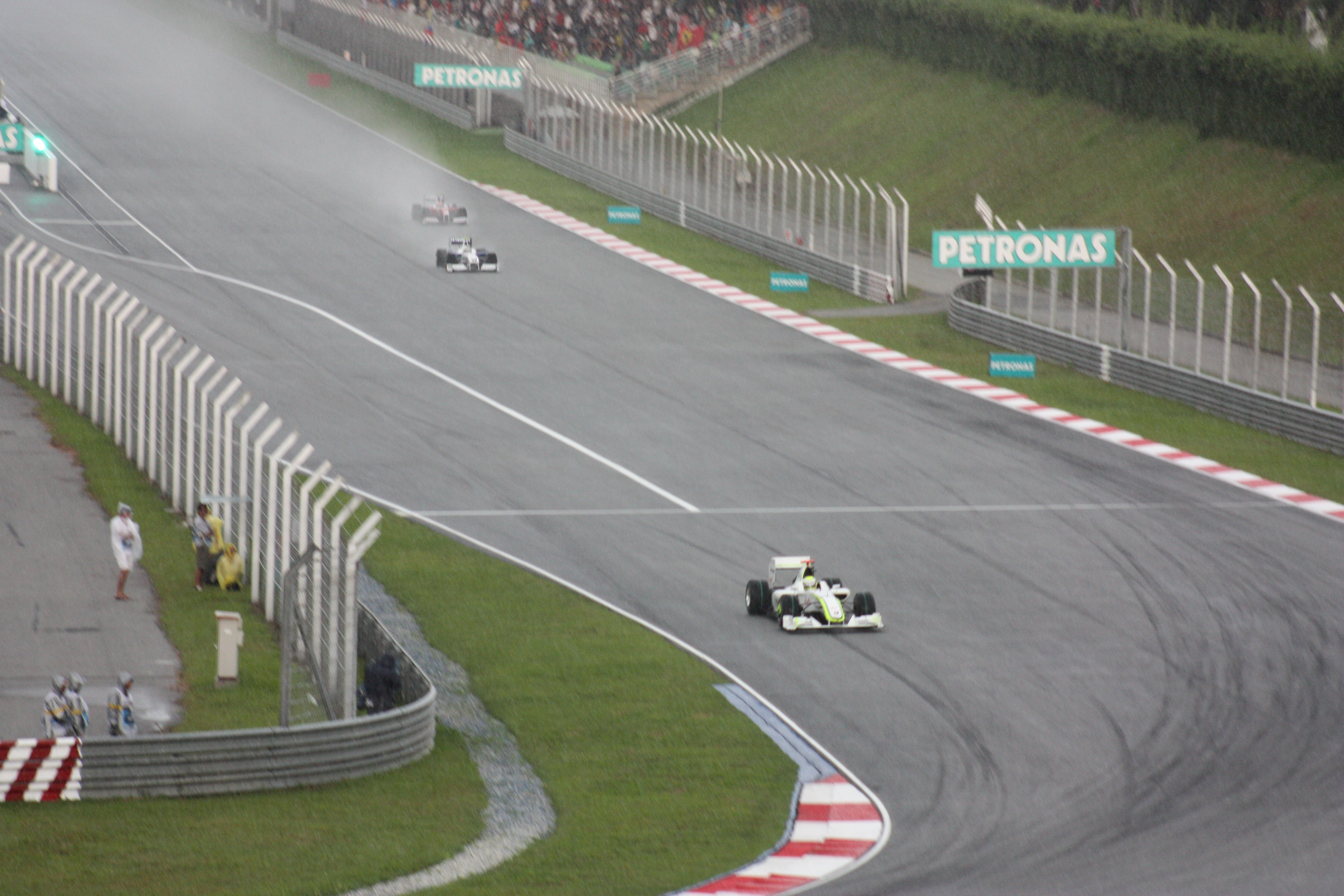
Photograph showing the correct positions of Jenson Button, Nick Heidfeld and Timo Glock on the last completed lap

Off the line, there was a clean getaway by all drivers, apart from Robert Kubica, who was forced to retire from engine problems after the first lap. Williams' Nico Rosberg moved from fourth on the grid to lead into the first corner, followed by Jarno Trulli and Fernando Alonso, who had used his KERS system to good effect to move up from tenth; Jenson Button made a poor start in his Brawn and was down to fourth. Heading into turn five, McLaren's Heikki Kovalainen ran wide onto the track's 'marbles' (fragments of degraded tyre rubber), and spun into early retirement.

After a slow start, Button caught and passed the heavier Renault of Alonso at turn thirteen for third place and set off after Trulli. Rosberg and Trulli stopped for fuel earlier than Button, who was able to pass them during the first round of pit stops and take the lead. Evidence of rain was barely noticed, but Kimi Räikkönen pitted to switch from dry to full wet tyres. However, his gamble did not pay off, as rain did not come as early as predicted, and he was forced to slow down significantly to delay the rapid wear of the wet tyres. (Without standing water on the track, wet tyres will not maintain structural integrity at high speeds, and will rapidly degrade over the course of a few laps.)

By lap 19, rain had started to fall and most of the drivers pitted for wet tyres. However, at this stage there was no standing water on the track, and so the wet tyres started to wear out very quickly. Timo Glock had been using intermediate tyres which were better suited to the conditions and moved rapidly up to third place. The other drivers followed this example and switched to intermediate tyres as well, which the majority of the field stayed on until lap 31 when the downpour finally reached the whole track, and drivers pitted for wet tyres once again. The conditions were proven to be so treacherous that Sebastien Buemi and Sebastian Vettel (who was in 8th position) had both spun out into retirement by lap 31 despite them being on the wet tyres right before the race was stopped.

Due to the torrential rain, the race was stopped on the 33rd lap and the results were taken from the classification at the end of lap 31 (the penultimate fully completed in accordance with sporting regulation 42.8). Half-points were subsequently awarded to the top eight. The race was the fifth out of six races in Formula One to be abandoned before 75% distance: the others were the 1975 Spanish and Austrian Grands Prix, the 1984 Monaco Grand Prix, the 1991 Australian Grand Prix and the 2021 Belgian Grand Prix. Button took his second victory of the season and five points, and it was the first time he had won back to back victories and his third career victory. The victory also meant that Brawn GP became the first team since Alfa Romeo in 1950 to win their first two Grands Prix. Nick Heidfeld was classified second ahead of Toyota's Timo Glock. Heidfeld was the first driver to take a podium position with a KERS-equipped car.

Some years later, James Vowles (Brawn's head of strategy) revealed that rain water got into the electronics in Button's steering wheel after the race was stopped, and his car would not have been able to continue if the race had restarted.

=== Post-race ===
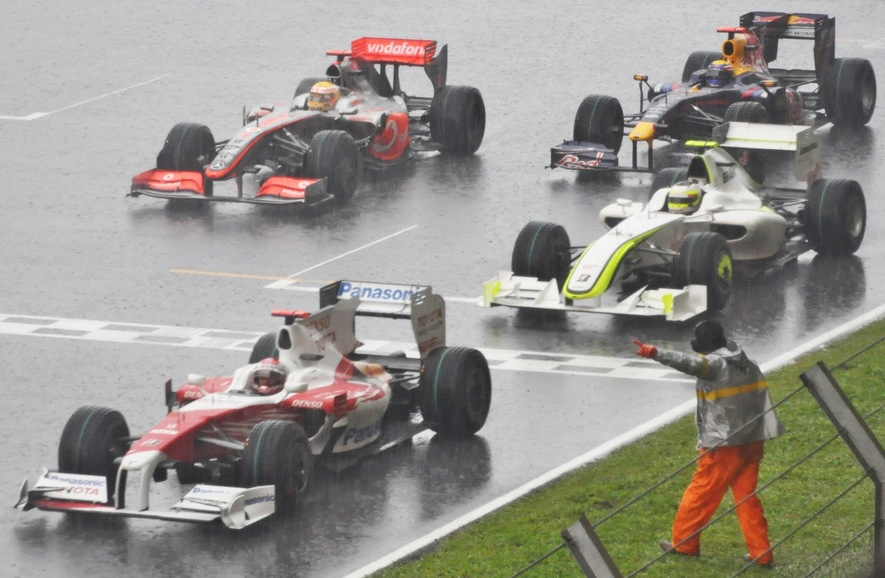
Trulli, Barrichello, Hamilton and Webber stop their cars on the start-finish straight following the decision to red-flag the race.

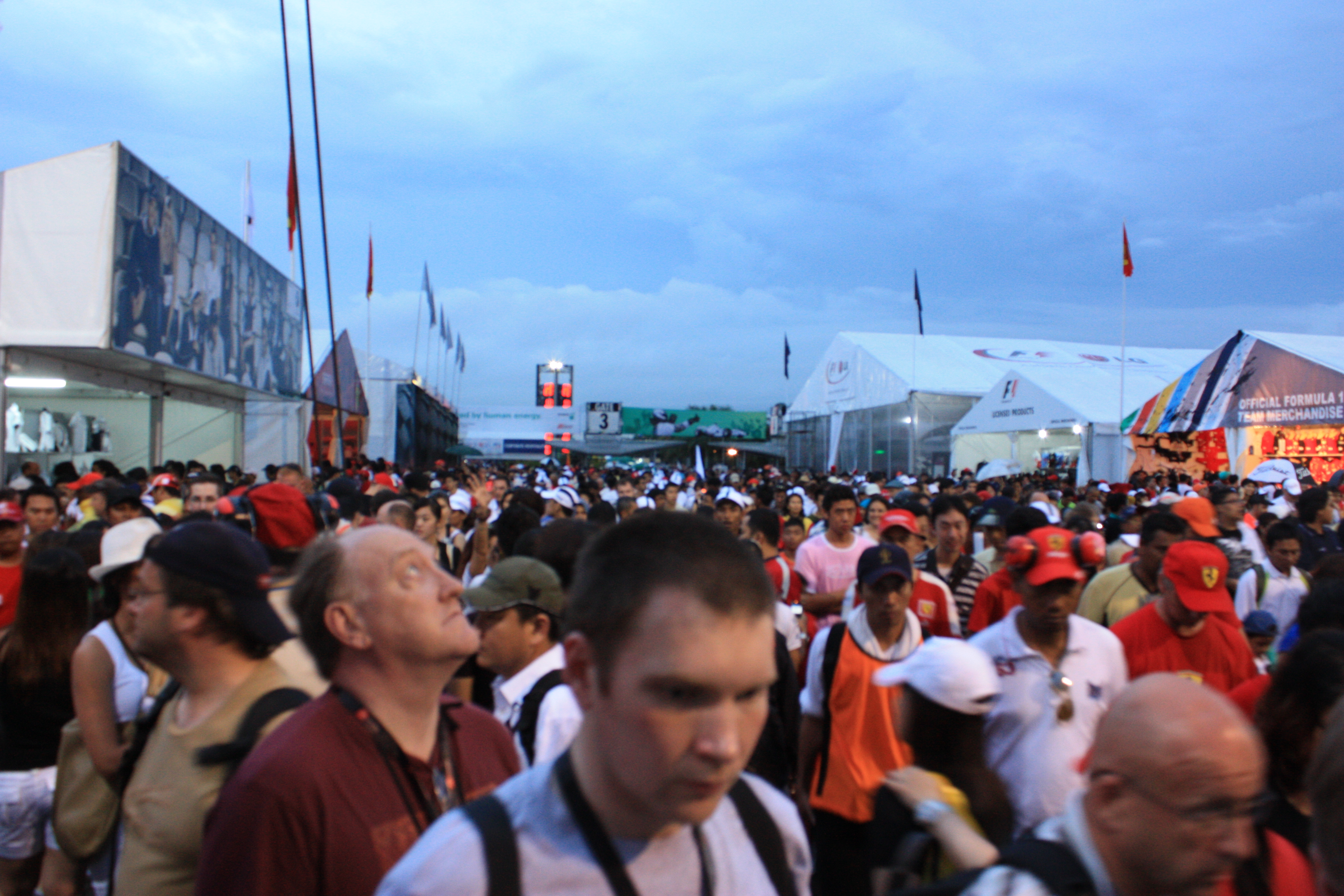
Crowd members leaving the stands after the race was abandoned.

The drivers generally backed the decision to abandon the race, citing diminishing visibility (due to the later starting time) as well as the heavy rain.

"The visibility is nothing, [we] could have a serious accident if we restart." — Fernando Alonso before the race was officially called off

"It was impossible to drive out there, it was very, very dangerous. It's the most dangerous conditions I have ever raced in," — Lewis Hamilton

"It was way too wet out there and the decision to call it off was correct. I would obviously love to have the 10 points, but this is the best we could have done, I think, and realistically it was the right thing to do. I'm sure some people will say 'we didn't see the whole race and it's disappointing' but you have to think about the safety sometimes. When the safety car is pulling away at 20 seconds a lap, you know that it's too wet for an F1 car." — Jenson Button

"It's dark now at seven o'clock so it was the right call not to make the re-start," — Mark Webber (a director of the Grand Prix Drivers' Association)

Officials in Malaysia also confirmed that they would review the start time of the 2010 Malaysian Grand Prix. Mokhzani Mahathir, chairman of the Sepang International Circuit, said he consulted Bernie Ecclestone after the race and they had agreed to look at the timings. However, Ecclestone revealed he had no qualms about the schedule, stating:

"I just have regrets about the rain, I don't see anything wrong with the start time, we just didn't know about the rain."

Mokhzani suggested the possibility of implementing a lighting system (similar to that used in the Singapore Grand Prix) to illuminate the circuit in future races.

== Classification ==
Cars that used the KERS system are marked with "‡"

=== Qualifying ===
Pos	No	Driver	Constructor	Part 1	Part 2	Part 3	Grid
1	22	(United Kingdom) Jenson Button	Brawn-Mercedes	1:35.058	1:33.784	1:35.181	1
2	9	(Italy) Jarno Trulli	Toyota	1:34.745	1:33.990	1:35.273	2
3	15	(Germany) Sebastian Vettel	Red Bull-Renault	1:34.935	1:34.276	1:35.518	13
4	23	(Brazil) Rubens Barrichello	Brawn-Mercedes	1:34.681	1:34.387	1:35.651	8
5	10	(Germany) Timo Glock	Toyota	1:34.907	1:34.258	1:35.690	3
6	16	(Germany) Nico Rosberg	Williams-Toyota	1:35.083	1:34.547	1:35.750	4
7	14	(Australia) Mark Webber	Red Bull-Renault	1:35.027	1:34.222	1:35.797	5
8	5	(Poland) Robert Kubica	BMW Sauber	1:35.166	1:34.562	1:36.106	6
9	4‡	(Finland) Kimi Räikkönen	Ferrari	1:35.476	1:34.456	1:36.170	7
10	7‡	(Spain) Fernando Alonso	Renault	1:35.260	1:34.706	1:37.659	9
11	6‡	(Germany) Nick Heidfeld	BMW Sauber	1:35.110	1:34.769		10
12	17	(Japan) Kazuki Nakajima	Williams-Toyota	1:35.341	1:34.788		11
13	1‡	(United Kingdom) Lewis Hamilton	McLaren-Mercedes	1:35.280	1:34.905		12
14	2‡	(Finland) Heikki Kovalainen	McLaren-Mercedes	1:35.023	1:34.924		14
15	11	(France) Sébastien Bourdais	Toro Rosso-Ferrari	1:35.507	1:35.431		15
16	3‡	(Brazil) Felipe Massa	Ferrari	1:35.642			16
17	8‡	(Brazil) Nelson Piquet Jr.	Renault	1:35.708			17
18	21	(Italy) Giancarlo Fisichella	Force India-Mercedes	1:35.908			18
19	20	(Germany) Adrian Sutil	Force India-Mercedes	1:35.951			19
20	12	(Switzerland) Sébastien Buemi	Toro Rosso-Ferrari	1:36.107			20

- ^1Sebastian Vettel received a 10-place grid penalty for causing an avoidable accident involving Robert Kubica at the Australian Grand Prix.
- ^2Rubens Barrichello received a 5-place grid penalty for a gearbox change.

=== Race ===
Pos	No	Driver	Constructor	Laps	Time/Retired	Grid	Points
1	22	(United Kingdom) Jenson Button	Brawn-Mercedes	31	55:30.622	1	5
2	6‡	(Germany) Nick Heidfeld	BMW Sauber	31	+ 22.722	10	4
3	10	(Germany) Timo Glock	Toyota	31	+ 23.513	3	3
4	9	(Italy) Jarno Trulli	Toyota	31	+ 46.173	2	2.5
5	23	(Brazil) Rubens Barrichello	Brawn-Mercedes	31	+ 47.360	8	2
6	14	(Australia) Mark Webber	Red Bull-Renault	31	+ 52.333	5	1.5
7	1‡	(United Kingdom) Lewis Hamilton	McLaren-Mercedes	31	+ 1:00.733	12	1
8	16	(Germany) Nico Rosberg	Williams-Toyota	31	+ 1:11.576	4	0.5
9	3‡	(Brazil) Felipe Massa	Ferrari	31	+ 1:16.932	16	
10	11	(France) Sébastien Bourdais	Toro Rosso-Ferrari	31	+ 1:42.164	15	
11	7‡	(Spain) Fernando Alonso	Renault	31	+ 1:49.422	9	
12	17	(Japan) Kazuki Nakajima	Williams-Toyota	31	+ 1:56.130	11	
13	8‡	(Brazil) Nelson Piquet Jr.	Renault	31	+ 1:56.713	17	
14	4‡	(Finland) Kimi Räikkönen	Ferrari	31	+ 2:22.841	7	
15	15	(Germany) Sebastian Vettel	Red Bull-Renault	30	Spun Off	13	
16	12	(Switzerland) Sébastien Buemi	Toro Rosso-Ferrari	30	Spun Off	20	
17	20	(Germany) Adrian Sutil	Force India-Mercedes	30	+ 1 Lap	19	
18	21	(Italy) Giancarlo Fisichella	Force India-Mercedes	29	Spun Off	18	
Ret	5	(Poland) Robert Kubica	BMW Sauber	1	Engine	6	
Ret	2‡	(Finland) Heikki Kovalainen	McLaren-Mercedes	0	Spun Off	14	

- Scheduled for 56 laps but stopped early due to heavy rain and then not resumed due to darkness. Half points awarded.

== Championship standings after the race ==
Drivers' Championship standings

	Pos.	Driver	Points
	1	(United Kingdom) Jenson Button	15
	2	(Brazil) Rubens Barrichello	10
	3	(Italy) Jarno Trulli	8.5
	4	(Germany) Timo Glock	8
5	5	(Germany) Nick Heidfeld	4

Constructors' Championship standings

	Pos.	Constructor	Points
	1	(United Kingdom) Brawn-Mercedes	25
	2	(Japan) Toyota	16.5
4	3	(Germany) BMW Sauber	4
1	4	(France) Renault	4
1	5	(United Kingdom) Williams-Toyota	3.5

- Note: Only the top five positions are included for both sets of standings.

== See also ==
- 2009 Malaysian GP2 Asia Series round

Previous race: 2009 Australian Grand Prix	FIA Formula One World Championship; 2009 season	Next race: 2009 Chinese Grand Prix
Previous race: 2008 Malaysian Grand Prix	Malaysian Grand Prix	Next race: 2010 Malaysian Grand Prix
