= 2009 Australian Grand Prix =

Coordinates: 37°50′59″S 144°58′06″E

Race 1 of 17 in the 2009 Formula One World Championship
| ← Previous race | Next race → |

Race details
- Date: 29 March 2009
- Official name: 2009 Formula 1 ING Australian Grand Prix
- Location: Melbourne Grand Prix Circuit, Melbourne, Australia
- Course: Temporary street circuit
- Course length: 5.303 km (3.295 miles)
- Distance: 58 laps, 307.574 km (191.118 miles)
- Weather: Sunny with temperatures reaching up to 27 °C (81 °F)

Pole position
| Driver | (United Kingdom) Jenson Button | Brawn-Mercedes |
- Time: 1:26.202

Fastest lap
| Driver | (Germany) Nico Rosberg | Williams-Toyota |
- Time: 1:27.706 on lap 48

Podium
| First | (United Kingdom) Jenson Button | Brawn-Mercedes |
| Second | (Brazil) Rubens Barrichello | Brawn-Mercedes |
| Third | (Italy) Jarno Trulli | Toyota |

The 2009 Australian Grand Prix (formally the 2009 Formula 1 ING Australian Grand Prix) was a Formula One motor race held on 29 March 2009 at the Melbourne Grand Prix Circuit, Melbourne, Australia. It was the first race of the 2009 Formula One World Championship. The 58-lap race was won by Jenson Button for the Brawn GP team after starting from pole position. Rubens Barrichello finished second in the other Brawn GP car, with Jarno Trulli third for Toyota.

Brawn GP became the first constructor since Mercedes-Benz at the 1954 French Grand Prix to qualify on pole position, and then go on to win the race on their Grand Prix debut. The race also became the second race in Formula One history to finish under stabilised safety car conditions—after the 1999 Canadian Grand Prix—following a collision between Robert Kubica and Sebastian Vettel, who were running second and third, on lap 56. This was Jenson Button's second Grand Prix victory, and his first since the 2006 Hungarian Grand Prix.

This also marked the first race since the 1997 European Grand Prix that cars competed using slick tyres.

== Report ==
=== Background ===
The Grand Prix was contested by 20 drivers, in 10 teams of two. The teams, also known as constructors, were Ferrari, McLaren-Mercedes, Renault, Brawn-Mercedes, Force India-Mercedes, BMW Sauber, Toyota, Red Bull Racing-Renault, Williams-Toyota and Toro Rosso-Ferrari.

The race saw the debut of Brawn GP, whose owner Ross Brawn had bought out Honda Racing F1. The Brawn cars were driven by Honda's former drivers Rubens Barrichello and Jenson Button. The race also saw the debut of Sébastien Buemi, driving for Toro Rosso. Buemi became the first Swiss driver in Formula One since Jean-Denis Délétraz in 1995. Buemi replaced Sebastian Vettel who had moved to Red Bull Racing replacing the retired David Coulthard.

Prior to the opening race of the season, McLaren and Renault planned to boycott the season opener due to money not being paid to the teams. However, the boycott was avoided and both teams arrived in Melbourne for the opening round. In a second dispute, several teams protested to the stewards about the legality of the Brawn, Toyota and Williams cars, with arguments that the diffuser on the cars were illegal. The protest was thrown out by stewards. However, the teams that initially protested, had appealed against the decision, with a FIA International Court of Appeal hearing set for after the Malaysian Grand Prix. At the hearing, the diffusers were deemed legal.

The race itself saw a later start time, Having started at 15:30 AEDT (04:30 UTC) in 2008, the race was moved to 17:00 AEDT (06:00 UTC) for 2009. However, the executives of the Australian Grand Prix rejected calls from Bernie Ecclestone to move it to a night race, just like the one held in Singapore, as they want to honour their current contract to 2015 of a twilight race.

=== Practice and qualifying ===
"In both sessions sector two was working particularly well. There are only two 'real' corners in the sector, but it's really interesting and it feels good in the car. The FW31 is well balanced all round the track, but seems even more so there than in any other places. After a winter of testing, it's good to get out on a new, fresh track and we seem to be in a better position than we thought."

— Nico Rosberg, after topping the timesheets in both Friday sessions and his thoughts on how well the Williams FW31 was comparing against his rivals.

Three practice sessions were held before the race; the first was held on Friday morning and the second on Friday afternoon. Both sessions lasted 1 hour and 30 minutes with weather conditions dry throughout. The third session was held on Saturday morning and lasted an hour, and was also dry throughout. The Williams cars of Nico Rosberg and Kazuki Nakajima set the pace, ending up first and second with only five-hundredths of a second splitting the two. The only other driver that was within half a second of them was Kimi Räikkönen's Ferrari, who was marginally behind Nakajima. Rubens Barrichello set the fourth fastest time in the first official session for the Brawn team, outpacing teammate Jenson Button, who could only muster up the sixth fastest lap. Heikki Kovalainen was the faster of the two McLaren drivers in fifth, with teammate and reigning world champion Lewis Hamilton languishing all the way down in 16th, some 2.3 seconds off the pace of the Williams cars. Rounding out the top ten were Felipe Massa's Ferrari, the Toyota of Timo Glock, Adrian Sutil's Force India (thus meaning that four of the six Mercedes–engined cars were in the top ten) and the first of the Renaults driven by Fernando Alonso.

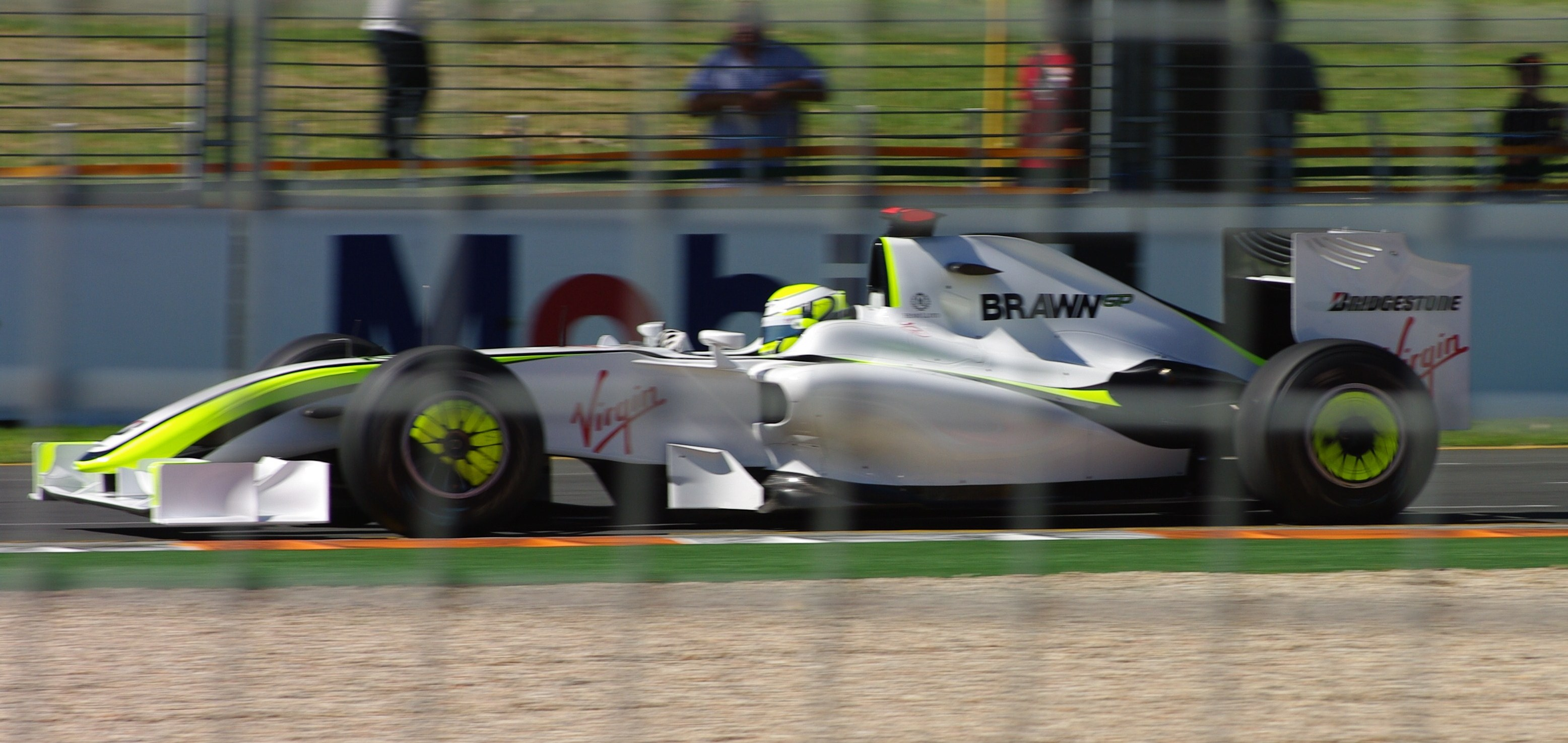
Jenson Button's Brawn BGP 001, after a sponsorship deal was completed between the Brawn team and the Virgin Group founder Richard Branson

Rosberg was again the pace-setter in the second practice session, with a time some six-tenths of a second faster than what he achieved during the first 90-minute session. This time, Barrichello was second in his Brawn with the Toyota of Jarno Trulli in third. This marked an improvement for Trulli as he was only 12th in the first session. The only Australian in the field, Mark Webber ended up fourth for Red Bull Racing, ahead of Button, Glock and Nakajima. Webber's teammate Sebastian Vettel was eighth, after a morning session that was interrupted by a hydraulic failure which led him to pull his car off the road between turns six and seven. This ruled him out of the rest of the session, and restricted him to bottom of the timesheets and only four laps completed. Rounding out the top ten were Sutil's Force India, which ended up ninth again, and Massa in tenth. The three teams running the controversial rear diffusers (Brawn, Williams, and Toyota) were consistently the best teams on the track.

Rosberg completed a clean sweep of top spots in practice, by coming fastest in Saturday's practice session. His time edged out Trulli's Toyota by just three thousandths of a second. Button was third, and the only other driver to break into the 1:25 lap times, just under two-tenths of a second behind Rosberg. Massa improved again to end up fourth, and be the only driver from McLaren or Ferrari to finish in the top ten. Nakajima again impressed in the Williams, finishing fifth, in front of Barrichello, Webber, and Glock, who took the next three fastest times and were split by around six hundredths of a second. The two BMW Sauber drivers—Robert Kubica and Nick Heidfeld—rounded out the top ten, as they appeared in the top ten on the timesheets for the first time, after a fraught pair of practice sessions on Friday.

"The last five or six months for both of us have been so tough because of going from not having a drive or any future in racing to putting it on pole here is just amazing, it really is and I have got to give all credit to the team and Ross [Brawn] and Nick [Fry] for making this happen. This is where we deserve to be after the tough times we have had."

— Jenson Button, after giving Brawn GP a debut pole.

The qualifying session was split into three parts. The first part of qualifying runs for 20 minutes and eliminates the cars that finished the session 16th or lower. The second part of qualifying lasts for 15 minutes and eliminates cars that finished in positions 11 to 15. The final part of qualifying lasts for 10 minutes and determines the positions from first to tenth, and effectively decides who starts the Grand Prix in pole position. After dominating all three practice sessions on Friday, and again on Saturday morning, Rosberg did not fare so well in qualifying, managing a time only good enough for fifth position. The Brawn cars of Button and Barrichello dominated qualifying with the Brazilian finishing first in the first two parts of the session. In the third session, Button managed to beat his teammate's time by three-tenths of a second, and secured the fourth pole position of his career and his first pole since the 2006 Australian Grand Prix, that ended with Button's car blowing its engine on the final straight. Vettel's Red Bull was third with teammate Webber in tenth at his home race, which would later become eighth after the disqualification of the Toyotas. Kubica improved even further to line up fourth, easily outpacing teammate Heidfeld, who did not make the third session and was running the KERS system, which Kubica was not. After Glock was demoted, Massa was promoted to sixth and was the best KERS runner, ahead of teammate Räikkönen, with Heidfeld and Alonso completing the top ten, after the Toyotas' disqualification. After the session, Hamilton was demoted five places as his gearbox had to be changed, which originally dropped him from 15th on the grid, to 20th. Some hours after Hamilton's penalty, the Toyota cars had their times declared void as the rear wing on their cars was deemed to be illegal. This pushed Hamilton up to 18th, with Glock in 19th and Trulli 20th.

=== Race ===
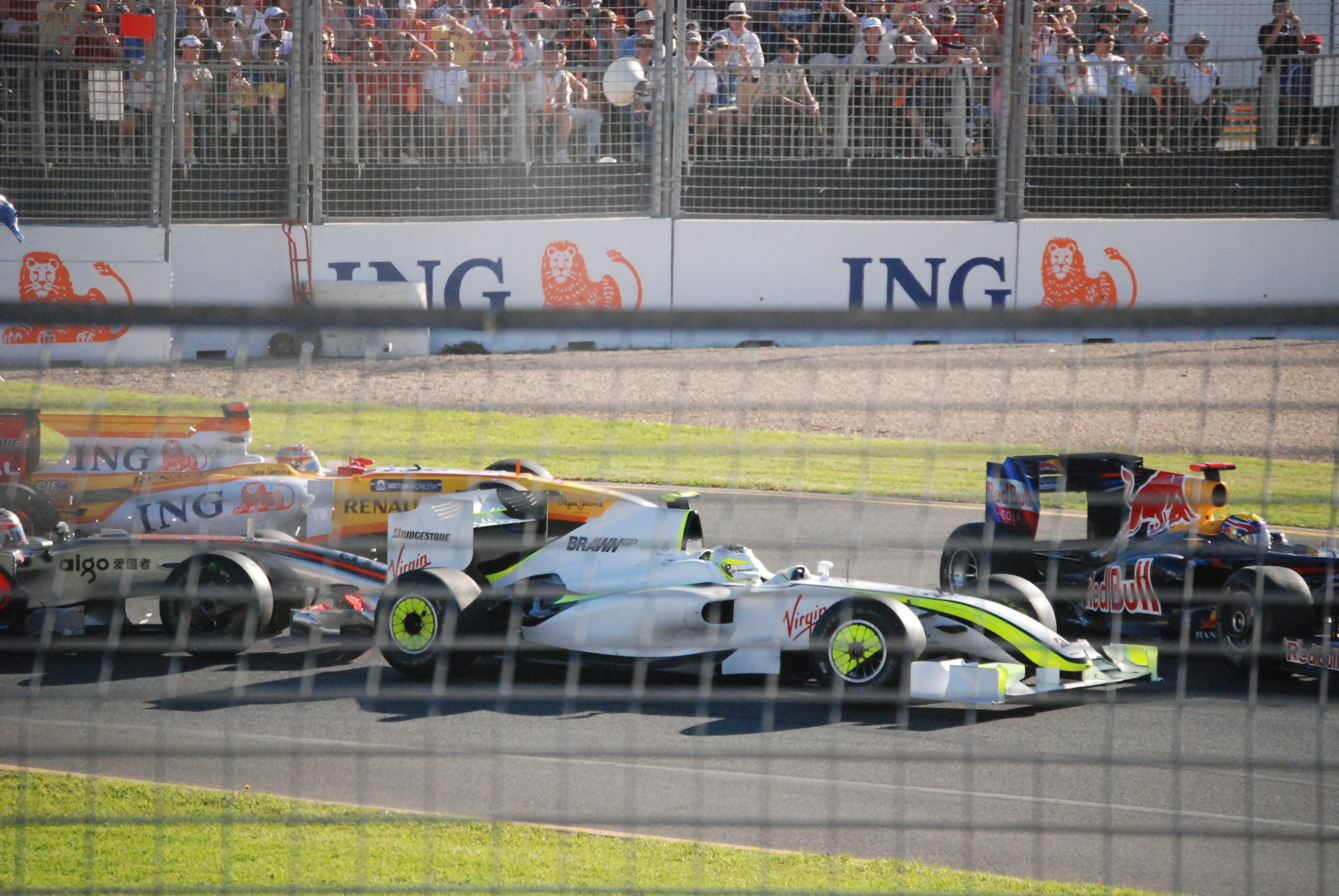
The first corner incident: Barrichello (front) pushes Webber (right) into Heidfeld (out of picture).

The conditions on raceday were similar to what had been seen on both Friday and Saturday, the air temperature at 25 °C (77 °F); clear skies throughout, with the race beginning at 17:00 AEDT. Button led away and retained his pole position lead into turn one. He was closely followed by Vettel, Rosberg, Massa, Kubica and Räikkönen. Those six led away and were unaffected by the chaos that occurred behind, in turn one. After near-stalling, Barrichello had dropped from second to ninth, and challenged up the inside of Webber's Red Bull as they entered turn one. After being hit from behind, Barrichello's left front tyre impacted with the right-hand sidepod of Webber's car which half-spun the Australian into the BMW Sauber of Heidfeld. Once Barrichello had emerged relatively unscathed, Webber impacted on the front left of Kovalainen's McLaren causing irreparable damage to the left front suspension of the Finn's car. At turn three, Massa attempted a move down the inside of Rosberg, forcing the German off course and as a result, falling behind the Brazilian. At the end of the lap, Webber, Sutil and Heidfeld all pitted to repair damage caused in the first corner incident.

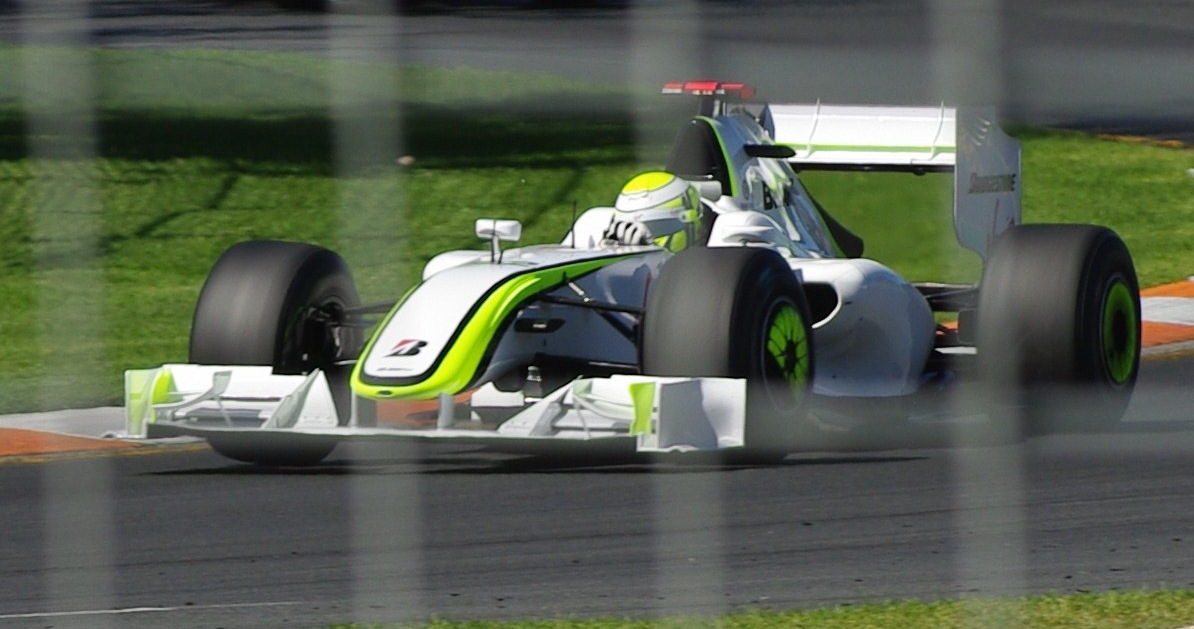
The race was won by Jenson Button for Brawn GP on the team's Formula One début.

Further down the field, reigning champion Hamilton was progressing through the field having started eighteenth. After the first corner incident, he moved up to 13th at the end of the first lap. He passed Bourdais for 12th on lap two, Fisichella for 11th on lap three, and broke into the top ten, after passing Buemi on lap four. Out front, Button was beginning to establish a lead of over four seconds by the time he set the fastest lap on lap six, with a lap of 1:28.787. Vettel was still running second ahead of Massa, Kubica, Räikkönen with Rosberg completing the top six. Hamilton attempted to pass Nelson Piquet Jr. for ninth, doing so at Turn 13.

On lap ten, Rosberg attempted a move on Räikkönen into turn one, and succeeded to move up into fifth place on track. In the process, Räikkönen was slowed up by the German's move, allowing Barrichello to close up on the straight that leads into Turn 3. The Brawn car closed up thanks to picking up the slipstream, but even this left him several car lengths behind the Ferrari as they entered the braking zone for the corner. Barrichello's car snaked under brakes, and clipped the back of Räikkönen's car, causing more damage to his car. Räikkönen was forced wide by the hit, and Barrichello's momentum initiated a passing move into Turn 4, succeeding and moving into sixth place. The Finn pitted at the end of the lap, changing from the option tyre, onto the prime compound and did not change compounds again for the remaining distance.

Massa and Hamilton both pitted on lap eleven, with both drivers changing from the option tyres, moving onto the harder rubber. This allowed for a scrap for third to begin between Kubica, Rosberg and Barrichello to occur, as the latter two had caught up on the Pole. It would only last one lap however, as Kubica pitted on lap twelve, the final driver to change his first stint super-softs. Out front, Button continued to lead by 4.3 seconds from Vettel with Rosberg third, Barrichello fourth and Nakajima fifth. Lap 16 saw both Vettel and Rosberg pit, with Vettel remaining in second and Rosberg fell to 12th. Rosberg was delayed by a slow left front tyre change, which was a major contribution to his nine-place fall in the race.

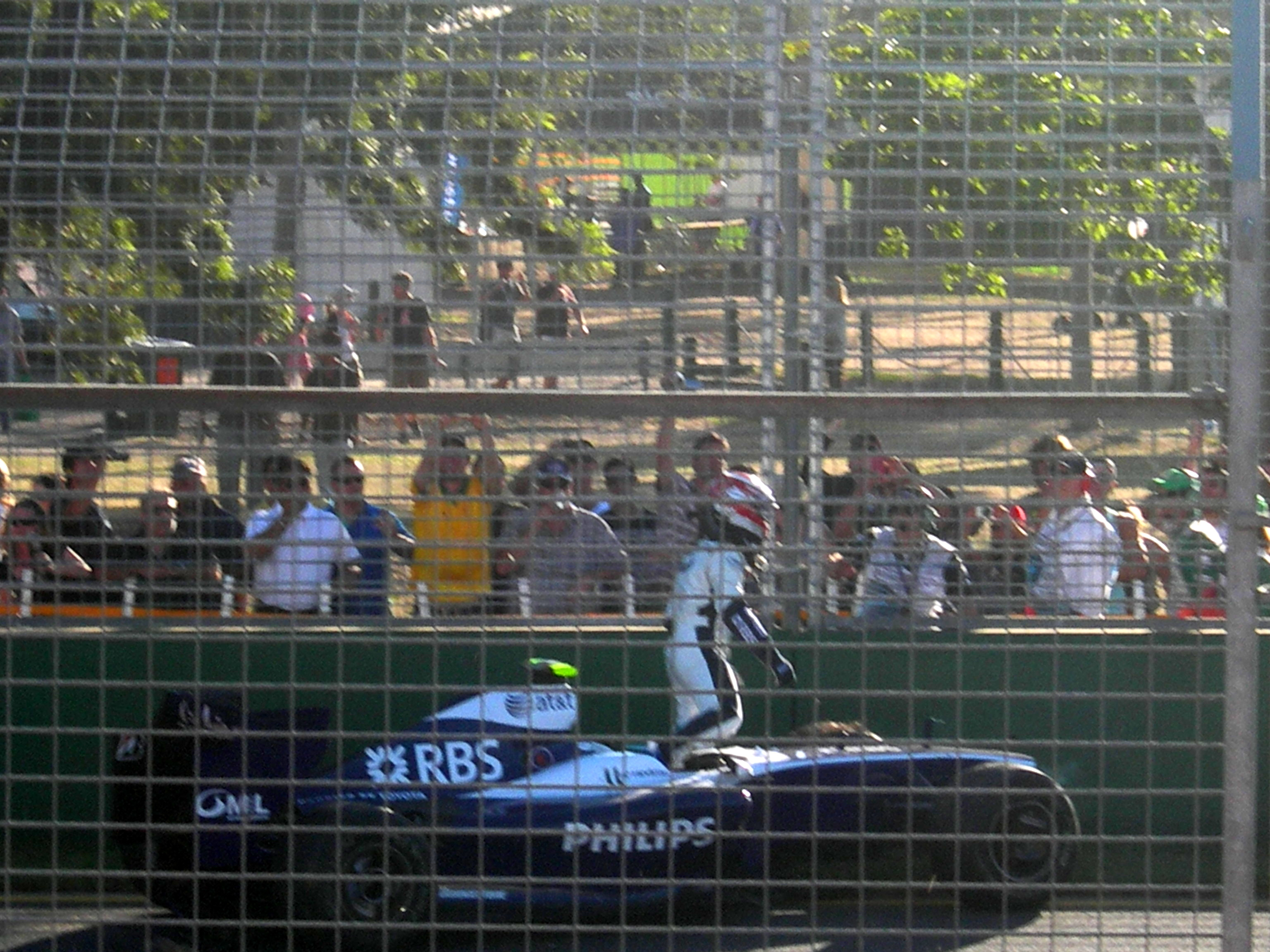
Nakajima retired on lap 18 bringing out the safety car.

On lap 18, whilst running in fourth place, Nakajima ran slightly wide on the exit of Turn 4 and proceeding to put too much power down spinning the car sideways and head on into the wall between Turns 4 and 5. After hitting the wall, his front wing ended up in the middle of the track and directly on the racing line. Button made his pit stop a lap later, and exited pit lane as the safety car was deployed. After the field cycled through, the safety car eventually picked up Button and would remain on the track until the end of lap 24.

At the restart, Button held position out front, ahead of Vettel, Massa, Kubica – who was still weaving his car to get temperature into his tyres after he had crossed the start/finish line – and Räikkönen. In a battle for sixth, Piquet had lined up a move on sixth-placed Rosberg, causing the German to defend on the inside. However, Piquet lost control of his car under braking – and possibly due to the tyres not being up to the required temperature – and spun off into the turn one gravel and out of the race. Further down the field, Glock lost two places to Hamilton and Alonso, as both drivers attacked hard on the restart.

Positions remained the same until lap 31, when Massa made his second and final pit stop of the race and emerged back into the fray in 14th place. After returning to the race, Massa was told by race engineer Rob Smedley to step up his pace, as according to him Kubica and Räikkönen were a threat due to longer middle stints. Trulli pitted on lap 33, having made his first pit stop on lap 10. A lap later, Kubica set the fastest lap, with a 1:27.989, and two laps later, the Pole bettered that by a thousandth of a second – his fastest lap of the race. At this point, Button was still extending his lead over Vettel, leading by over five seconds from the German.

Kubica pitted from third place on lap 39, and rejoined the circuit in seventh, just behind Hamilton, who was still making his way up the field. At the same time, Räikkönen made his second stop and rejoined in ninth. Buemi had quietly made his way up into fourth place, just in front of the Brit, before he made his second and final pit stop on lap 41. Two laps later, Räikkönen made an error whilst exiting Turn 13, and spun off, glancing the wall on the right hand side. He eventually returned to the pits, to make an unscheduled pit stop. Also pitting this lap was Hamilton, then running in third place. It was a close-run thing at pit exit, but Hamilton did enough to hold off Massa and rejoined in tenth position.

Rosberg and Vettel pitted on consecutive laps, trying to limit the amount of time that they would have to spend on the super-soft tyre. Both drivers held station in seventh and second positions respectively. At this time, Massa was slowly exiting the race with suspension damage, limping round before retiring the Ferrari in pit lane. Button pitted for the final time on lap 47, and suffered a very slow stop, with a sticking left rear wheel change, with the pit stop lasting 13.2 seconds. A lap later, Rosberg set the fastest lap of the race – 1:27.706 – and was still closing on Glock. Glock and Barrichello both pitted late on, and the race order on lap 55 was Button, Vettel, Kubica, Barrichello, Trulli, Hamilton, Glock, Alonso, Rosberg and Buemi.

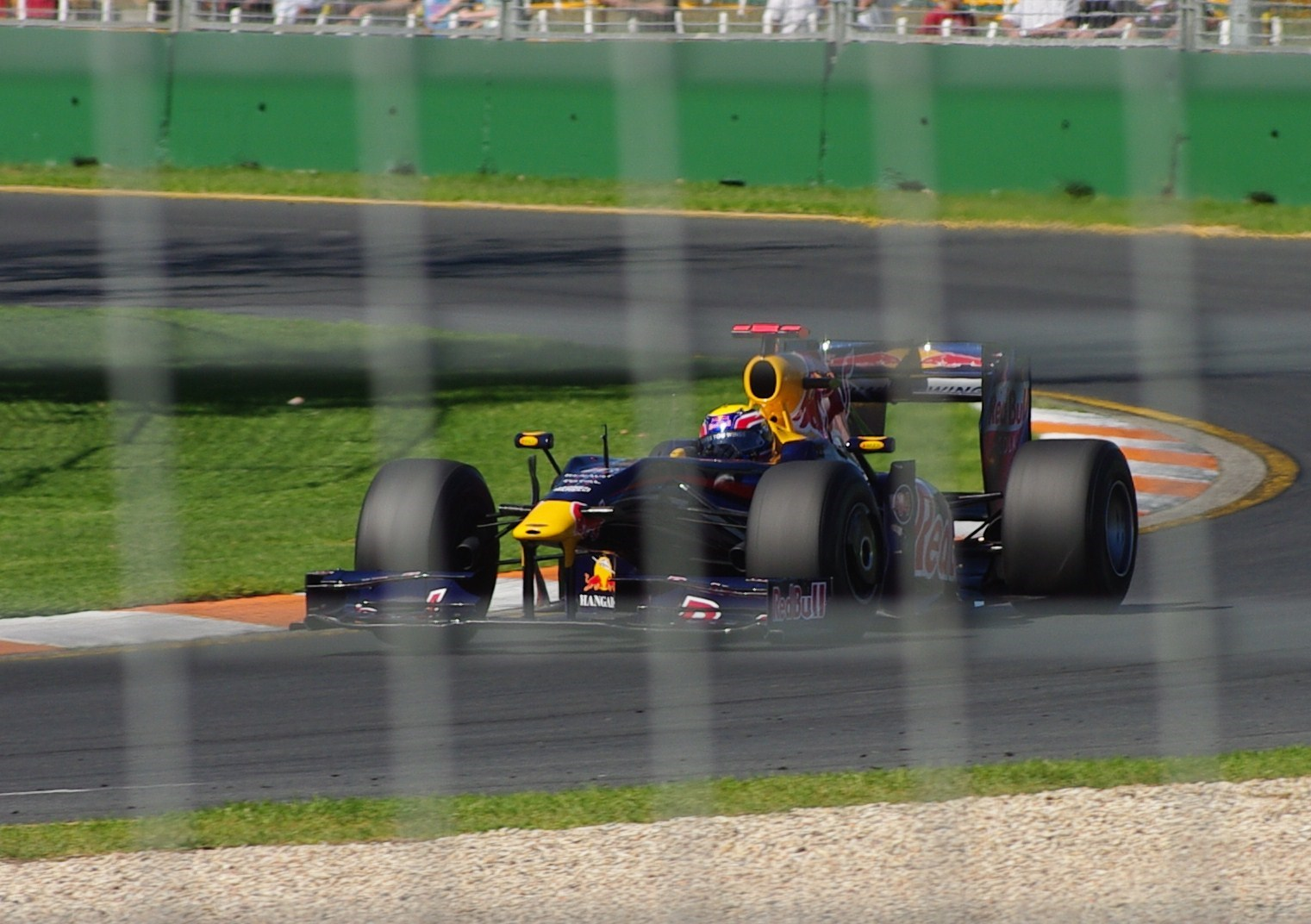
Mark Webber, driving for Red Bull endured a disappointing Grand Prix, being the only lapped car.

Lap 56 saw Vettel make a slight mistake in Turn 1, and allowed Kubica to make a run down the outside, towards Turn 3. Vettel braked early and Kubica was ahead turning in. However, Vettel turned in and his front wing locked onto the sidepod of Kubica's BMW. Due to this collision, both cars lost their front wings, but they carried on towards Turns 4 and 5. Kubica was ahead, but without downforce he understeered off the circuit into the wall and out of the race. Meanwhile, Vettel also made an error on the way into the corner, sliding and hitting the wall, causing his left front tyre to bend back on itself. He carried on, as he was still in the points at this time. He could only continue on for just over a lap, as he ground to a halt between Turns 10 and 11. As the debris was not cleared up in time, this led to only the second safety car finish in Formula One.

As stated by Article 40.14 of the sporting regulations for Formula One, the safety car pulled in and the drivers proceeded over the line without overtaking. Button secured a debut victory for Brawn after leading the race from start to finish. He led home teammate Barrichello as they completed a Brawn one-two. Trulli finished third although there were accusations that he passed Hamilton under the safety car. This would later turn out to be true, and he was penalised twenty-five seconds pushing him down to 12th in the results, thus promoting Hamilton to third. This decision was later reversed: Trulli was eventually re-instated to his third finishing position and Hamilton was disqualified for misleading stewards during their investigation. Glock finished fourth, having started from the pit lane, and was followed home by Alonso, Rosberg, Buemi and Bourdais. Buemi's two points made him Switzerland's first points scorer since Marc Surer at the 1985 Italian Grand Prix.

=== Post-race ===
"We have worked incredibly hard for this victory today and to see the dedication, commitment and sheer hard work come to fruition with Jenson and Rubens bringing home a one-two finish for Brawn GP at the first race of the season is immensely rewarding. After everything that our team has been through over the past four months, this is quite simply a sensational result. It is just the beginning for us and it wasn't a perfect race by any means so we will learn from today and continue to improve. We have to keep developing the car throughout the season if we want to challenge for further wins and the championship."

— Ross Brawn, team principal of Brawn GP, reflecting on his team's début.

The top three finishers on the road appeared on the podium and in the subsequent press conference, where Button reflected on a somewhat easy race, in which he led all 58 laps, although it was not without its problems: "The first few laps of the race were great for me and I could settle into a pace, but then when the safety car came out I struggled massively to get heat into the tyres. The car was hitting the ground and just before the safety car pulled in I flat-spotted the tyre pretty severely. I was struggling quite a bit with vibration and with the poor light as well. Being in the front it should be easy, but it was not easy at all." He also reflected on his and his team's achievements, as they became the first driver/team combination since Juan Manuel Fangio and Mercedes at the 1954 French Grand Prix to win the team's debut race, having started from pole position:

It is not just for me, but for the whole team. This is a fairy tale ending really to the first race of our career together and I hope that we can continue this way and I know we are going to fight to keep this car competitive and with the limited resources we have to keep it at the front. The whole team has done a good job and this has got to continue as this is where I think we deserve to be and we have worked very hard for this. So thank you very much to the team and bring on Malaysia.

Barrichello picked up his first podium since the 2008 British Grand Prix, and his highest finish since the now-infamous 2005 United States Grand Prix, in which only the six Bridgestone-shod cars started due to safety concerns with Michelin's tyres. He praised the strength of his Brawn car, as he was involved in several incidents during the race. He also reflected upon his fluffed start, which ultimately led to the first of his incidents, at Turn 1. "I hit anti-stall, so the car went into neutral. I recovered quite quickly but then I lost a lot of pace compared to people and I was hit from behind from a McLaren and that put me sideways and I hit someone really hard. I thought the car was done from that crash but I survived quite well, but on my first stint my nose was falling apart and I lost the braking stability when I hit Kimi as well. He closed the door and I couldn't avoid him. I had a lot of mixed emotions during the race, but it was fantastic. I started second but could only hope for one better but after the start I am delighted to be here with the second place."

Trulli was pleased with his third place on the road, but was however, unaware of the penalty that he was due to receive for his late race pass of Hamilton under the safety car. "Well, after yesterday's disappointment this was a great day, especially for my team. I started from the pit and I was lucky enough to get away from the first corner accident. From that time on I was just pushing, pushing, pushing really hard because the car was good."

After an investigation, stewards deemed that Sebastian Vettel was in the wrong after his collision with Robert Kubica, which resulted in both of them not finishing the race. Vettel received a fine and a 10-place grid penalty to be applied in the following round in Malaysia. Red Bull Racing, Vettel's team, also received a $50,000 fine for letting him continue with a damaged car, for over a lap.

== Liegate ==
Also after the race, Trulli's third place was put under investigation. The stewards decided that the Italian regained his position overtaking Hamilton during a safety car period, having run off the track when the safety car was out. Trulli was penalised 25 seconds, moving him down to 12th. Trulli's explanation of the incident was: "When the safety car came out towards the end of the race Lewis Hamilton passed me but soon after he suddenly slowed down and pulled over to the side of the road. I thought he had a problem so I overtook him as there was nothing else I could do." In public Hamilton corroborated this, stating that the McLaren team had told him to let Trulli repass. Behind closed doors, however, Hamilton told the stewards that he had received no instruction to allow Trulli past, and had not consciously done so. Toyota had appealed the penalty firstly to the stewards, but that appeal was rejected, as a team cannot appeal a time penalty—in lieu of the fact that the offence occurred within the last five laps of the race—in accordance with Article 16.3 of the Sporting Regulations for Formula One. Toyota then appealed to the clerk of the course, Tim Schenken, but later retracted this appeal stating that: "Having considered recent judgements of the International Court of Appeal, it is believed any appeal will be rejected."

The Trulli/Hamilton case was reopened to examine new evidence, and both drivers were summoned to a stewards' inquiry on 2 April 2009, prior to the Malaysian Grand Prix. McLaren continued to insist it had not given orders to allow Trulli past, even after being played an audio recording of such an instruction over team radio. Hamilton, as well, continued to assert his false statement. The stewards decided that Hamilton and McLaren had misled them, having contradicted the available evidence. Hamilton was disqualified and McLaren stripped of their constructors' points. Trulli was re-instated into third place. McLaren's Sporting Director, Dave Ryan, was subsequently suspended by the team the day after Hamilton's disqualification was announced. McLaren were summoned to appear before the FIA on 29 April 2009 to answer charges of breaching the International Sporting Code. At this meeting, McLaren were given a suspended three-race ban, which would only be applied if a similar offence occurred within the next twelve months. It was revealed that Dave Ryan had been sacked by McLaren. The controversy was subsequently dubbed "liegate".

As this was the first race of the season, Button led the Drivers' Championship with 10 points, followed by Barrichello on 8 and Trulli on 6. Meanwhile, in the Constructors' Championship, Brawn picked up a maximum 18 points thanks to the 1–2 for Button and Barrichello. This gave them a seven-point lead over Toyota, with Renault on four points, thanks to Alonso's fifth place.

== Classification ==
Cars that used the KERS system are marked with "‡"

=== Qualifying ===
| Pos | No | Driver | Constructor | Part 1 | Part 2 | Part 3 | Grid |
|---|---|---|---|---|---|---|---|
| 1 | 22 | (United Kingdom) Jenson Button | Brawn-Mercedes | 1:25.211 | 1:24.855 | 1:26.202 | 1 |
| 2 | 23 | (Brazil) Rubens Barrichello | Brawn-Mercedes | 1:25.006 | 1:24.783 | 1:26.505 | 2 |
| 3 | 15 | (Germany) Sebastian Vettel | Red Bull-Renault | 1:25.938 | 1:25.121 | 1:26.830 | 3 |
| 4 | 5 | (Poland) Robert Kubica | BMW Sauber | 1:25.922 | 1:25.152 | 1:26.914 | 4 |
| 5 | 16 | (Germany) Nico Rosberg | Williams-Toyota | 1:25.846 | 1:25.123 | 1:26.973 | 5 |
| 6 | 10 | (Germany) Timo Glock | Toyota | 1:25.499 | 1:25.281 | 1:26.975 | PL |
| 7 | 3‡ | (Brazil) Felipe Massa | Ferrari | 1:25.844 | 1:25.319 | 1:27.033 | 6 |
| 8 | 9 | (Italy) Jarno Trulli | Toyota | 1:26.194 | 1:25.265 | 1:27.127 | PL |
| 9 | 4‡ | (Finland) Kimi Räikkönen | Ferrari | 1:25.899 | 1:25.380 | 1:27.163 | 7 |
| 10 | 14 | (Australia) Mark Webber | Red Bull-Renault | 1:25.427 | 1:25.241 | 1:27.246 | 8 |
| 11 | 6‡ | (Germany) Nick Heidfeld | BMW Sauber | 1:25.827 | 1:25.504 | | 9 |
| 12 | 7‡ | (Spain) Fernando Alonso | Renault | 1:26.026 | 1:25.605 | | 10 |
| 13 | 17 | (Japan) Kazuki Nakajima | Williams-Toyota | 1:26.074 | 1:25.607 | | 11 |
| 14 | 2‡ | (Finland) Heikki Kovalainen | McLaren-Mercedes | 1:26.184 | 1:25.726 | | 12 |
| 15 | 1‡ | (United Kingdom) Lewis Hamilton | McLaren-Mercedes | 1:26.454 | No time | | 18 |
| 16 | 12 | (Switzerland) Sébastien Buemi | Toro Rosso-Ferrari | 1:26.503 | | | 13 |
| 17 | 8‡ | (Brazil) Nelson Piquet Jr. | Renault | 1:26.598 | | | 14 |
| 18 | 21 | (Italy) Giancarlo Fisichella | Force India-Mercedes | 1:26.677 | | | 15 |
| 19 | 20 | (Germany) Adrian Sutil | Force India-Mercedes | 1:26.742 | | | 16 |
| 20 | 11 | (France) Sébastien Bourdais | Toro Rosso-Ferrari | 1:26.964 | | | 17 |

- ^1 Both Toyotas were demoted to the back of the grid for running illegal rear wings and opted to start from the pit lane.
- ^2 Lewis Hamilton was given a five-place grid penalty for gearbox change.

=== Race ===
| Pos | No | Driver | Constructor | Laps | Time/Retired | Grid | Points |
|---|---|---|---|---|---|---|---|
| 1 | 22 | (United Kingdom) Jenson Button | Brawn-Mercedes | 58 | 1:34:15.784 | 1 | 10 |
| 2 | 23 | (Brazil) Rubens Barrichello | Brawn-Mercedes | 58 | +0.807 | 2 | 8 |
| 3 | 9 | (Italy) Jarno Trulli^{[4]} | Toyota | 58 | +1.604 | PL | 6 |
| 4 | 10 | (Germany) Timo Glock | Toyota | 58 | +4.435 | PL | 5 |
| 5 | 7‡ | (Spain) Fernando Alonso | Renault | 58 | +4.879 | 10 | 4 |
| 6 | 16 | (Germany) Nico Rosberg | Williams-Toyota | 58 | +5.722 | 5 | 3 |
| 7 | 12 | (Switzerland) Sébastien Buemi | Toro Rosso-Ferrari | 58 | +6.004 | 13 | 2 |
| 8 | 11 | (France) Sébastien Bourdais | Toro Rosso-Ferrari | 58 | +6.298 | 17 | 1 |
| 9 | 20 | (Germany) Adrian Sutil | Force India-Mercedes | 58 | +6.335 | 16 | |
| 10 | 6‡ | (Germany) Nick Heidfeld | BMW Sauber | 58 | +7.085 | 9 | |
| 11 | 21 | (Italy) Giancarlo Fisichella | Force India-Mercedes | 58 | +7.374 | 15 | |
| 12 | 14 | (Australia) Mark Webber | Red Bull-Renault | 57 | +1 lap | 8 | |
| 13 | 15 | (Germany) Sebastian Vettel | Red Bull-Renault | 56 | Collision damage/Accident | 3 | |
| 14 | 5 | (Poland) Robert Kubica | BMW Sauber | 55 | Collision damage/Accident | 4 | |
| 15 | 4‡ | (Finland) Kimi Räikkönen | Ferrari | 55 | Differential | 7 | |
| Ret | 3‡ | (Brazil) Felipe Massa | Ferrari | 45 | Suspension | 6 | |
| Ret | 8‡ | (Brazil) Nelson Piquet Jr. | Renault | 24 | Brakes | 14 | |
| Ret | 17 | (Japan) Kazuki Nakajima | Williams-Toyota | 17 | Accident | 11 | |
| Ret | 2‡ | (Finland) Heikki Kovalainen | McLaren-Mercedes | 0 | Collision damage | 12 | |
| DSQ | 1‡ | (United Kingdom) Lewis Hamilton ^{[3]} | McLaren-Mercedes | 58 | Misled stewards post-race | 18 | |

- ^3 Lewis Hamilton and McLaren were disqualified from the Grand Prix after the stewards found that they had provided deceptive information about the circumstances under which Jarno Trulli passed Hamilton under the safety car.
- ^4 Jarno Trulli was issued a 25-second penalty for overtaking Hamilton under the safety car, but was later reinstated back into third, after Hamilton was disqualified for misleading the stewards.

== Championship standings after the race ==
Drivers' Championship standings

| Pos. | Driver | Points |
|---|---|---|
| 1 | (United Kingdom) Jenson Button | 10 |
| 2 | (Brazil) Rubens Barrichello | 8 |
| 3 | (Italy) Jarno Trulli | 6 |
| 4 | (Germany) Timo Glock | 5 |
| 5 | (Spain) Fernando Alonso | 4 |

Constructors' Championship standings

| Pos. | Constructor | Points |
|---|---|---|
| 1 | (United Kingdom) Brawn-Mercedes | 18 |
| 2 | (Japan) Toyota | 11 |
| 3 | (France) Renault | 4 |
| 4 | (United Kingdom) Williams-Toyota | 3 |
| 5 | (Italy) Toro Rosso-Ferrari | 3 |

- Note: Only the top five positions are included for both sets of standings.

== See also ==
- 2009 Sprint Gas V8 Supercars Manufacturers Challenge

| Previous race: 2008 Brazilian Grand Prix | FIA Formula One World Championship; 2009 season | Next race: 2009 Malaysian Grand Prix |
| Previous race: 2008 Australian Grand Prix | Australian Grand Prix | Next race: 2010 Australian Grand Prix |
