= Hamilton–Rosberg rivalry =

Rivalry between Formula One drivers Lewis Hamilton and Nico Rosberg

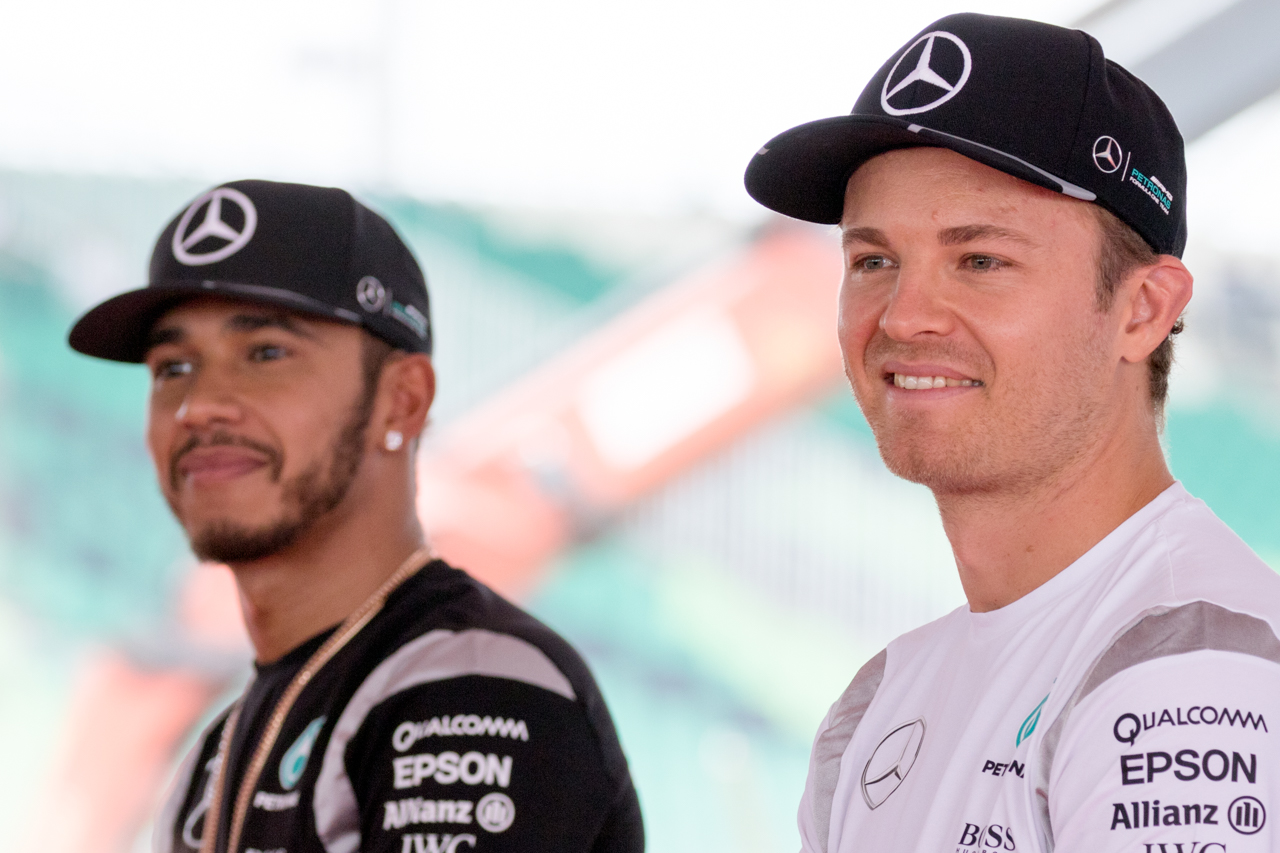
Hamilton (left) and Rosberg (right) at the 2016 Malaysian Grand Prix

The Hamilton–Rosberg rivalry, also known as the Silver War in reference to the Silver Arrows moniker and as Brocedes in reference to their previously close connection, was a Formula One rivalry between British racing driver Lewis Hamilton and German racing driver Nico Rosberg. The rivalry was most prevalent during their four years as team-mates at Mercedes from 2013 to 2016, a period in which the two drivers dominated the sport. The pair's relationship became strained and at times led to volatile confrontations on and off the track, with the duo being threatened with suspension at the height of their rivalry, especially in 2016. As a result, it has been compared to the Prost–Senna rivalry.

As teammates, Hamilton and Rosberg won 54 of 78 races over four seasons. Hamilton had 32 victories, 55 podium finishes and qualified ahead of Rosberg 42 times. Rosberg had 22 victories, 50 podium finishes and qualified ahead of Hamilton 36 times. During this period, Hamilton won the Formula One World Championship title twice, and Rosberg won the title once.

== History ==
Some journalists have contrasted the drivers' upbringings. Rosberg, an only child, was born in Germany but brought up in Monaco and is the son of the wealthy former Formula One world champion, Keke Rosberg, whereas Hamilton was raised on a council estate in Stevenage, and his father had to work multiple jobs to fund his son's junior racing. Hamilton began karting in 1993, when he was eight, at the Rye House Kart Circuit, and quickly began winning races and Cadet class championships. Rosberg started out in 1991 at the age of six. The pair were first teammates in 2000, still in karting. They raced for Mercedes Benz McLaren in Formula A, where Hamilton became European champion, with Rosberg not far behind. Robert Kubica, who raced with them before Formula One, recalled how they were competitive both on and off the track, saying: "They would even have races to eat pizza, always eating two at a time."

The pair's old karting boss, Dino Chiesa, admitted Hamilton was the faster driver whereas Rosberg was always more analytical. This led some to believe that Rosberg would achieve greater success in Formula One, the highest level of open-wheel racing, due to the intellectual capacity required to manage brakes, energy harvesting, tyre management, and moderate fuel usage. Hamilton's tyre management has frequently allowed him to push on for longer, often enabling optimum race strategies, and his fuel usage has regularly been better than almost anyone on the grid; Sky Sport's Mark Hughes commented: "Rosberg has a more scientific methodology, looks to fine-tune more specifically than Hamilton who typically tends just to find a balance he can work with, then adapt his driving around it." Formula One pundit and commentator Will Buxton compared the character and driving styles of the pair, labelling Hamilton as the faster driver with more natural ability, but with an intellect to match Rosberg's. In 2017, Buxton wrote: "Man to man against Rosberg, I can’t recall a single race this year where in the same machinery Hamilton’s fuel usage has been higher. He has made his tyres last. He has had to fight from the back of the field time and again (think Germany, think Hungary) and yet he hasn’t overworked his tires, he hasn’t used too much fuel. He has learned how to drive these new cars, and to extract the most from them using the least ... Far from the unintelligent chancer many paint Hamilton to be, he is proving to be the intellectual match of his teammate and, the better racer to boot."

The two drivers had differing careers prior to racing in Formula One. Hamilton was signed to McLaren's young driver support programme in 1998, after he approached McLaren team principal Ron Dennis at an awards ceremony three years earlier and said, "One day, I want to be racing your cars." After winning the British Formula Renault, Formula 3 Euro Series, and GP2 championships, he made his debut in Formula One driving for McLaren in 2007. Rosberg won the 2002 German Formula BMW title, and drove a Formula One car for the first time in testing for Williams in 2004. After winning the 2005 GP2 championship, Rosberg was confirmed as a Williams driver for 2006.

== Team-mates in Formula One (2013–2016) ==
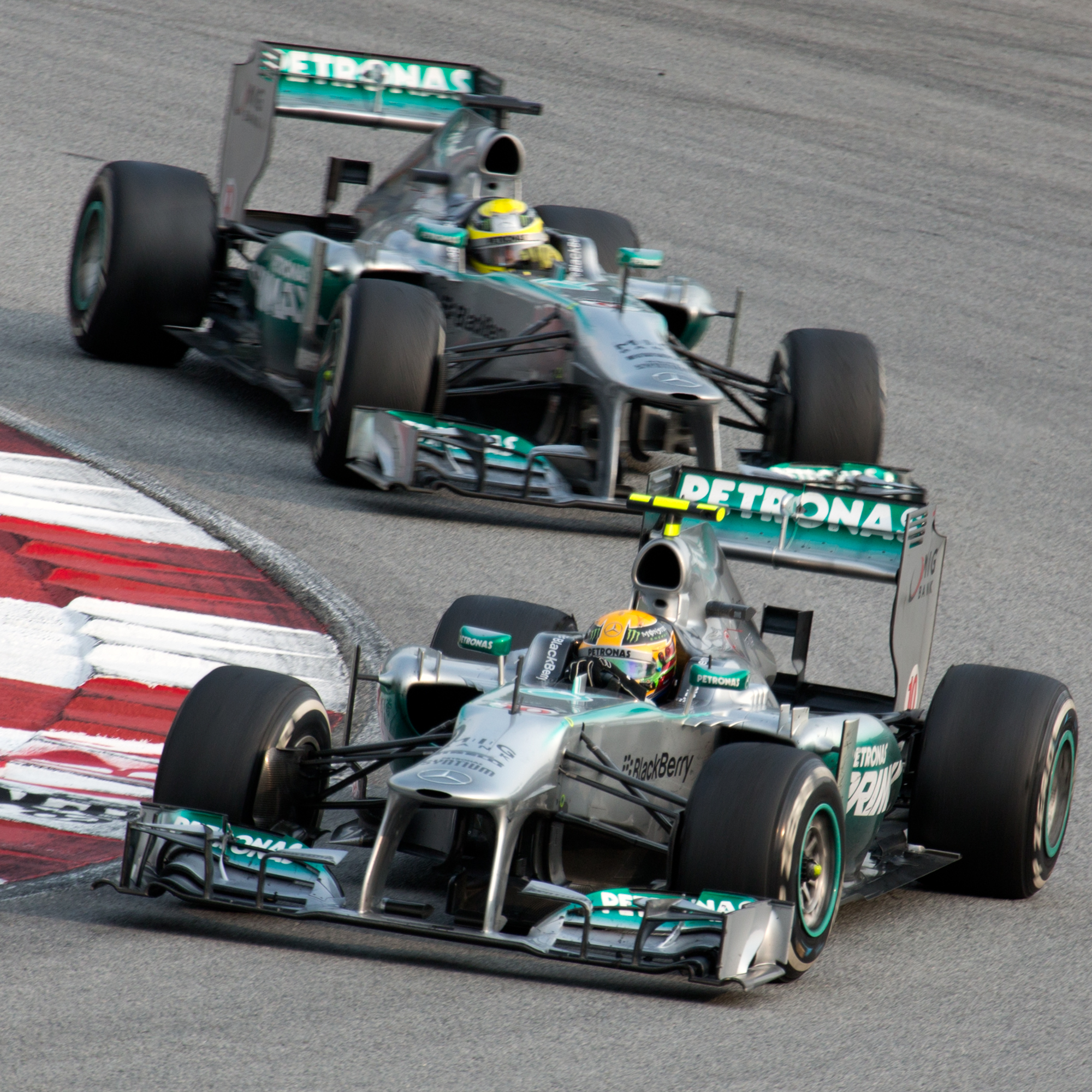
Rosberg was ordered to remain behind Hamilton at the 2013 Malaysian Grand Prix

=== 2013 season: Childhood friends reunited ===
In September 2012, it was announced after much speculation that Hamilton would be leaving McLaren to join Mercedes for the 2013 season, partnering Rosberg after signing a three-year contract with the team. The move was met with surprise by pundits and the public, with some describing the move to Mercedes, a team with no recent history of success, as a gamble.

Mercedes finished as runners-up to Red Bull in the Constructors' Championship with 360 points. Hamilton, who scored a win in Hungary, four third places and five pole positions finished fourth in the drivers' standings with 189 points. Rosberg, despite winning two races in Monaco and Britain, finished sixth with 171 points. He achieved four podium finishes in total and three pole positions.

The first sign of tensions between the pair was at the 2013 Malaysian Grand Prix, where Mercedes implemented team orders, telling Rosberg to hold station behind Hamilton in fourth place. Hamilton questioned the radio call and after the race admitted Rosberg had deserved the final spot on the podium. The incident passed without controversy, drowned out in the subsequent days by the "Multi-21" saga at Red Bull.

=== 2014 season: Hamilton wins the first title battle ===
After pre-season testing in Jerez, Mercedes were widely considered favourites for 2014, appearing to have reacted well to changes to regulations mandating the use of turbo-hybrid engines. Mercedes' anticipated pace was realised at the season opener in Australia, and also in Malaysia where Rosberg and Hamilton took dominant victories respectively, finishing far ahead of any other teams (polesitter Hamilton retired in Australia due to engine failure). Their first intense battle for victory happened at the 2014 Bahrain Grand Prix as both drivers engaged in a close duel for the win. A late safety car seemingly swung the favour to second-place Rosberg, who had the benefit of being on a faster tyre, but after the restart Hamilton held firm in a close wheel-to-wheel encounter which passed without the pair making contact. In parc ferme after the race the pair engaged in a mock fight. It later emerged that Rosberg had used engine modes banned by Mercedes to give himself a power advantage over Hamilton in the closing laps. Tensions further arose when Hamilton discovered Mercedes had compiled a dossier for Rosberg to study on Hamilton's performance data. Hamilton, who had outqualified Rosberg in the first two rounds and crossed the finish line 17 seconds ahead of Rosberg in Malaysia, said: "Someone in the team did a huge study on my pace in Malaysia. And since I arrived in Bahrain, Nico had a big document of all the places I was quick and used that to his advantage. So I will do the same for the next round in China and hope I can capitalise."

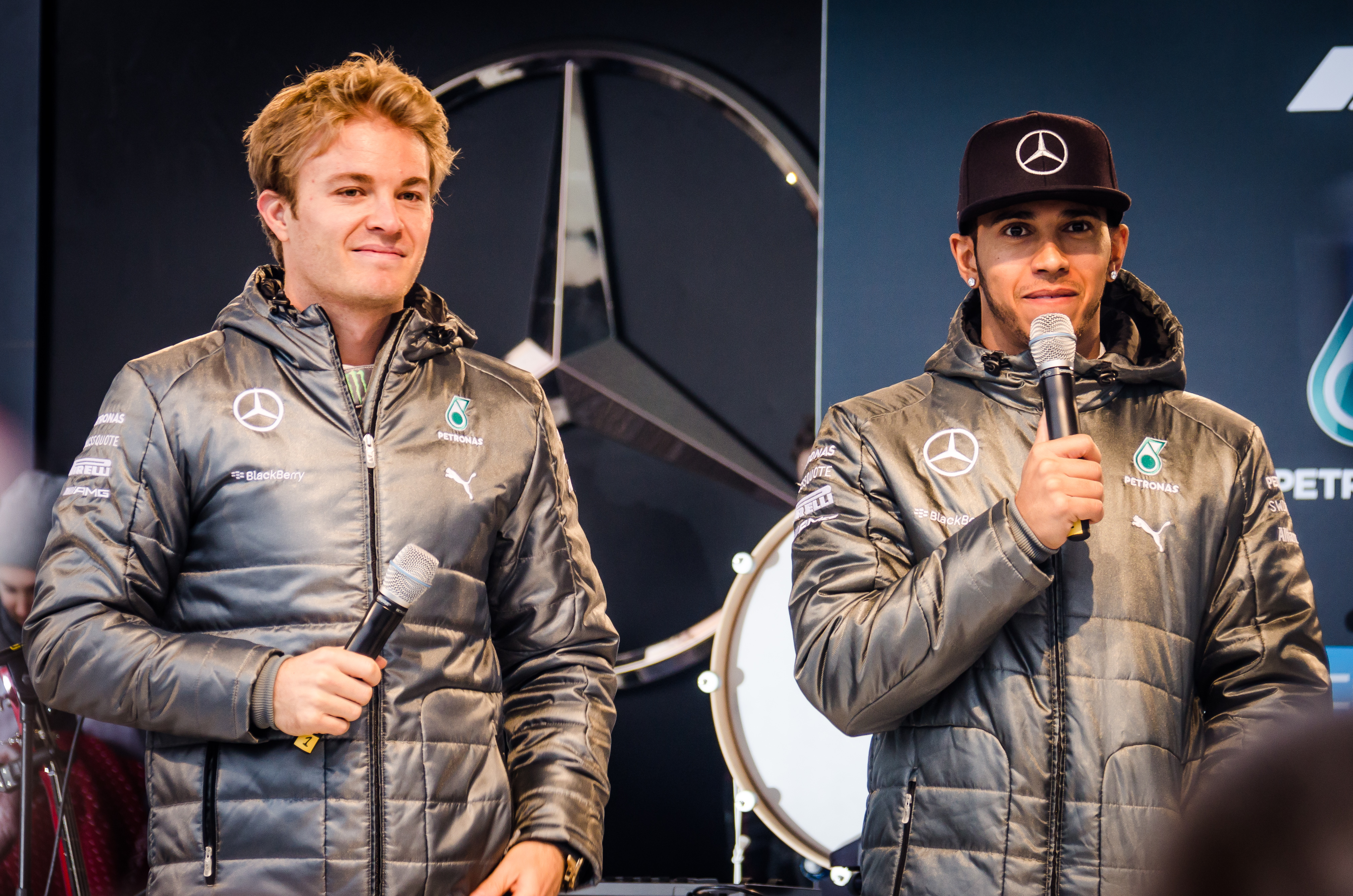
Team-mates Rosberg (left) and Hamilton (right) engaged in a season-long championship battle in 2014, decided in the final race of the season.

Hamilton arrived at the 2014 Spanish Grand Prix with the opportunity to move ahead of Rosberg in the championship should he take victory. He held off a charging Rosberg late in the race, who afterwards said an extra lap would have been enough to pass his team-mate. It was later revealed that Hamilton defended using the same engine mode that Rosberg used in Bahrain. Two weeks later, at the 2014 Monaco Grand Prix, Hamilton was faster than his teammate in all three practice sessions and again in Q2 ahead of the top-ten shootout. In the closing stages of Q3, both Mercedes drivers started a lap; Rosberg first, Hamilton second. Rosberg, on provisional pole, ran deep at Mirabeau and drove into a sliproad, prompting yellow flags and forcing Hamilton to abort his final qualifying lap. Some pundits made suggestions of foul play, to which Hamilton, when asked if he thought Rosberg had crashed on purpose, replied: "Potentially. I should have known that was going to happen." The stewards cleared Rosberg of any wrongdoing and team boss Toto Wolff refuted the conspiracy theory as "bull". Despite this, Hamilton made clear that he felt Rosberg had ruined his lap on purpose. After starting and finishing the race second, Hamilton announced that he and Rosberg were no longer friends.

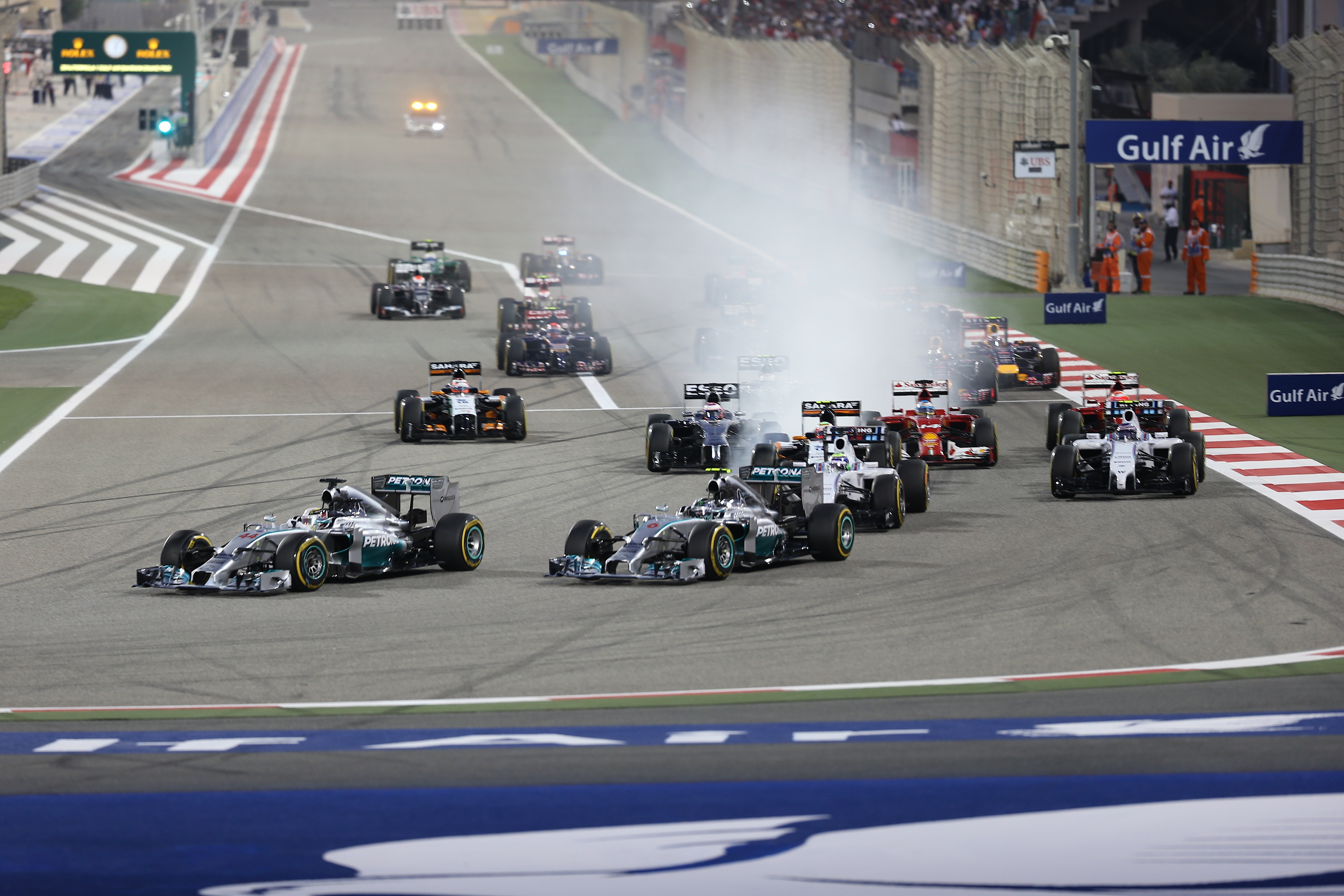
The start of the 2014 Bahrain Grand Prix where Hamilton passed Rosberg for the lead.

At the 2014 Hungarian Grand Prix, Rosberg qualified on pole while Hamilton was forced to start from the back of the grid when a fuel leak set his car alight in the first session of qualifying. Hamilton began to fight through the field before a mid-race safety car shuffled the order, putting Rosberg behind Hamilton but on a different strategy. When Rosberg, on fresher tires, closed the gap to Hamilton, Mercedes asked the British driver to move over, knowing the German would have to pit again before the end of the race. Hamilton, who had battled through from last position, replied: "I'm not slowing down for Nico − if he gets closer he can overtake." Hamilton's decision meant he held on to third, keeping Rosberg at bay in the final stages after his pit stop. Mercedes strongly suggested after the race that they felt that Hamilton's blocking cost Rosberg, his main championship rival, victory; however, Niki Lauda, the then non-executive chairman of Mercedes, spoke in support of Hamilton after the race, saying "From my point of view Lewis was right." No disciplinary action was taken by Mercedes after the race regarding the incident.

The two made contact at the 2014 Belgian Grand Prix, where Rosberg was widely criticised for hitting Hamilton at Les Combes, breaking his front wing and giving his teammate a puncture and effectively putting him out of the race. Rosberg would recover to finish second behind Daniel Ricciardo but it later emerged the German had left the nose of his car in to "prove a point" to his British teammate by not backing out. After being booed on the podium, Rosberg was forced to apologise and "suitable disciplinary measures" were taken. However, some defended the German after Hamilton claimed he thought Rosberg had hit him "deliberately", with The Telegraph journalist Oliver Brown describing the remark as "cement-brained ... another example of [Hamilton's] victimhood".

The season long title battle between the two was decided in the final race of the season in Abu Dhabi, where teams and drivers scored double the number of points awarded for race finish positions for the first time in the history of Formula One. Hamilton had a perfect start, passing Rosberg before turn one to take the lead, subsequently winning the race to secure his second World Championship title. Rosberg finished the race in 14th, as problems with the ERS system on his car significantly reduced his pace. Despite advice over the radio to retire the car, Rosberg said he would like to go to the end and finish the race, which he ultimately did. Ahead of the podium ceremony, Rosberg entered into the cooldown room to congratulate Hamilton on winning the title. Hamilton later paid tribute to Rosberg for his graciousness in defeat. Hamilton finished the season with 384 points, recording 11 wins and 7 pole positions ahead of Rosberg who finished with 317 points, recording 5 wins and 11 pole positions.

=== 2015 season: Hamilton clinches the title early ===
Mercedes looked to again be the fastest car on the grid for the 2015 season, as the new W06 Hybrid completed more laps in pre-season testing than any rival car, and did so using just one power unit. Similarly to the year before, Mercedes' dominance over the rest of the field was confirmed at the first race in Australia where the pair secured a Mercedes 1–2, over 34 seconds ahead of the third place Ferrari. In Malaysia, Hamilton took pole position despite suggestions that Rosberg had deliberately blocked him on his final run of the rain-affected qualifying session. Rosberg had already abandoned his lap, but did not move aside as Hamilton came past, forcing him off the racing line. It turned out not to matter as Hamilton had already done enough for pole on a previous lap. Hamilton played down the incident but Rosberg posed as a journalist during the post-qualifying press conference and questioned his team-mate about the incident.

The two Mercedes drivers once again dominated the season, although battle between the two turned out to be a less close affair as Hamilton won the title with three races remaining at the 2015 United States Grand Prix. Hamilton came to the Circuit of the Americas knowing he needed victory to claim the title that weekend. After Hamilton aggressively forced Rosberg wide at turn one to claim the lead, a thrilling race unfolded where the advantage continuously swung between both Mercedes drivers and the chasing Red Bulls. A fired-up Rosberg led in the closing stages but made a mistake at turn 12, running deep and letting his teammate through a handful of laps from the flag. Hamilton never relinquished the lead and claimed his third championship. Rosberg was furious after the race, saying his teammate's turn one move had been "one step too far". He tossed the second-place cap right back at Hamilton who had thrown it to him as they waited to take the podium, and refused to participate in the traditional spraying of champagne on the podium. Hamilton ended the season with 381 points, recording 10 wins and 11 pole positions to win the FIA Pole Trophy for most pole positions of the season, and the DHL Fastest Lap Award. Rosberg finished the season with 322 points, recording 6 wins and 7 pole positions.

=== 2016 season: Rosberg prevails ===
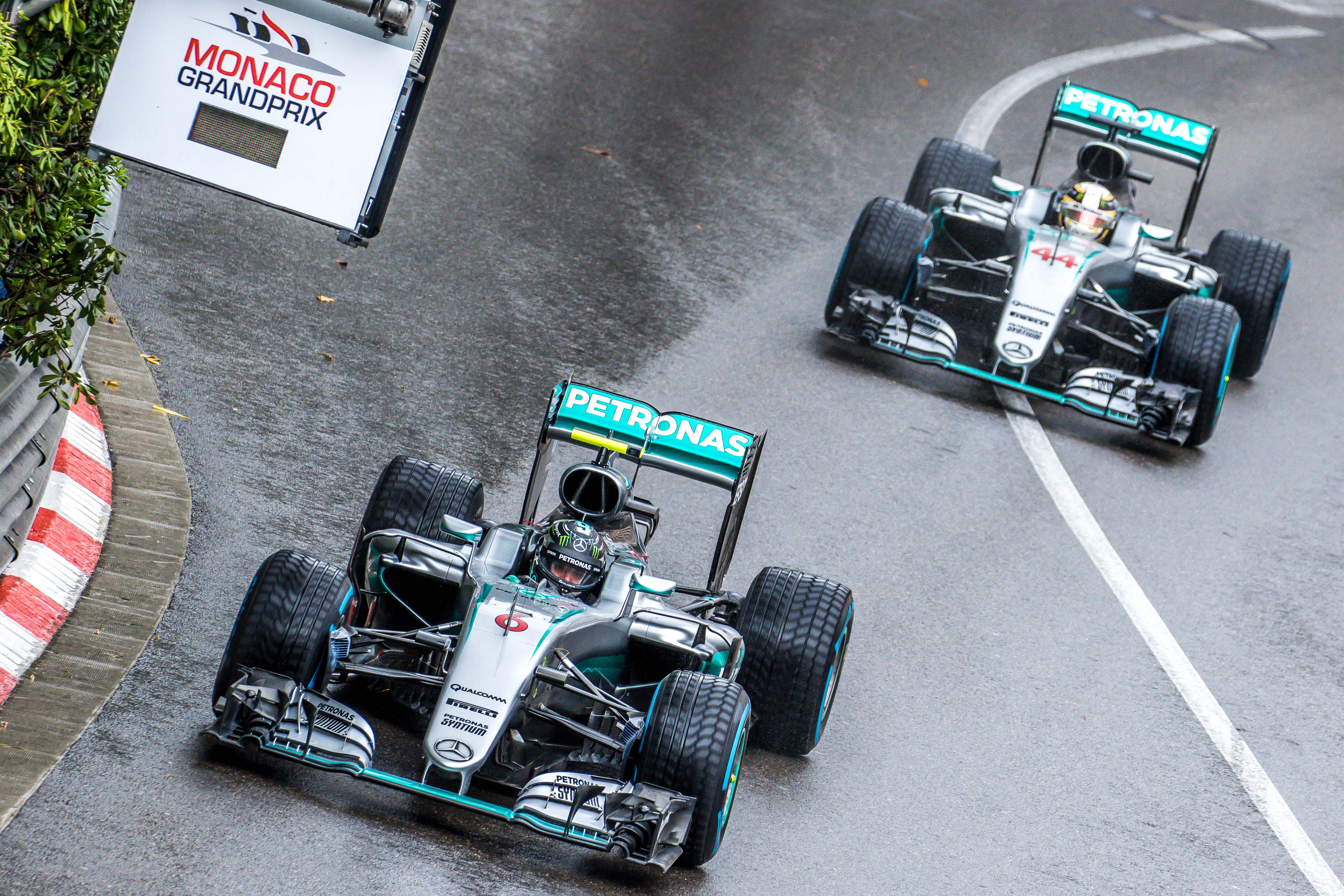
Hamilton (background) thanked Rosberg for letting him pass at the 2016 Monaco Grand Prix.

After losing the title in Austin in 2015, Rosberg went on a seven-race winning streak, which included the first four races of 2016. Coming to the 2016 Spanish Grand Prix he led Hamilton by 43 points, who then claimed pole position ahead of Rosberg. After a good start for both men, Rosberg passed Hamilton around the outside of turn one. Coming through the next few corners, Rosberg's car entered an incorrect engine mode due to an error the German had made on the formation lap. That meant he was slower than Hamilton coming out of turn 3, and Hamilton moved alongside Rosberg to overtake for the lead. Rosberg then forced Hamilton onto the grass where he lost control, eventually spinning into Rosberg and taking both drivers out of the race. While both drivers blamed each other for the incident, the stewards deemed it a racing incident, reasoning that Hamilton had been justified in his attempt to pass as he was 17 kilometres per hour (11 mph) quicker than Rosberg coming out of turn 3. Team chairman Niki Lauda apportioned blame toward Hamilton, lamenting the missed opportunity to secure a race win, saying: "Lewis is too aggressive. It is stupid, we could've won this race." Some defended Hamilton, with 1997 Formula One World Champion Jacques Villeneuve accusing Rosberg of dangerous driving. Afterwards, Hamilton insisted the incident did not harm his relationship with Rosberg, which he later admitted had mellowed since 2014.

At the 2016 Austrian Grand Prix, Rosberg looked on course to win, however was struggling with a brake issue. In the final laps Hamilton caught Rosberg, and a last-lap mistake from Rosberg at turn one gave Hamilton better drive on the long run to turn 3. Hamilton picked the outside line, moving alongside Rosberg as they approached the corner. As Hamilton turned-in to make the corner, Rosberg went straight on, causing a collision and damaging the German's front wing. Hamilton passed to win the race, while Rosberg dropped to fourth in the final corners. Both drivers blamed the other while Lauda blamed Rosberg. Furious team boss Toto Wolff called the incident "brainless" and said it "could easily have been a double DNF". He revealed both cars were "marginal on brakes" and threatened team orders in future races. The stewards blamed Rosberg for the incident, issuing him two penalty points for failing to allow "racing room" and causing a collision.

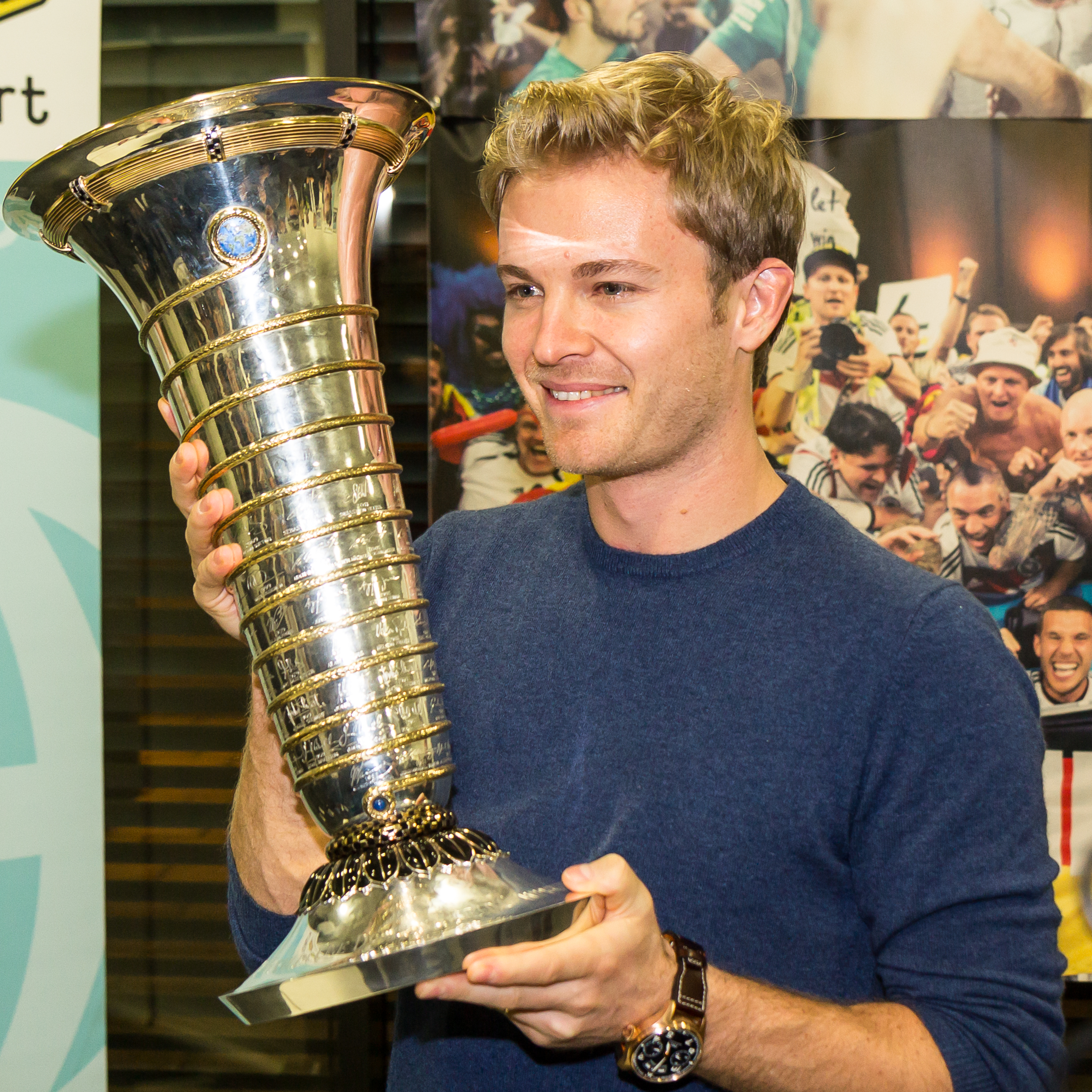
Rosberg retired from Formula One five days after winning his maiden World Championship title, the first reigning champion to do so since Alain Prost.

In the final race of the 2016 season in Abu Dhabi, Rosberg entered the round with a twelve-point lead over teammate Hamilton in the World Drivers' Championship. In the final laps of the race, Hamilton defied team orders, first from his race engineer Peter Bonnington and then by the team's technical director Paddy Lowe, and deliberately slowed to back Rosberg into the chasing pack at end of the race in a bid to encourage rivals Sebastian Vettel and Max Verstappen to overtake his teammate, which would have allowed him to win the World Championship. Despite Hamilton's tactics, Rosberg finished in second and clinched his maiden World Championship by five points over Hamilton. Wolff later conceded Mercedes got it wrong in issuing team orders, regretting the decision to interfere and stating the team should have let the drivers race.

==== Rosberg's retirement ====
Just five days after winning his first World Drivers' Championship, Rosberg announced his shock retirement from Formula One at the FIA Prize Giving Ceremony in Vienna, having reached the "pinnacle" of his career. He was the first reigning champion to retire in this way since Alain Prost in 1993. Hamilton said he was not surprised by the announcement; despite their strained relationship, he was still saddened to see his long-time rival leave. Hamilton said: "The sport will miss him, but I wish him all the best. This is the first time he's won in 18 years, hence why it was not a surprise that he decided to stop. But he's also got a family to focus on and probably wants to have more children. Formula One takes up so much of your time." He also lamented the end of the rivalry between the two, saying: "In terms of missing the rivalry, of course because we started karting when we were 13 and we would always talk about being champions. When I joined this team, Nico was there, which was something we spoke about when we were kids. So it's going to be very, very strange, and, for sure, it will be sad to not have him in the team next year."

==== Post-racing relationship ====
A year after Rosberg retired, Hamilton said in an interview that he had no desire to fix his friendship with Rosberg and the two had barely spoken, despite living nearby to one another in Monaco. In 2018, Rosberg reiterated Hamilton's words but admitted in a Q&A session on his YouTube channel that he hoped one day to rekindle his friendship with Hamilton. Rosberg has also repeatedly praised Hamilton for his subsequent achievements in Formula One and has labelled him as one of the all-time greats of the sport. By 2024, the rift in their friendship was healed, with Hamilton making efforts to repair the relationship. Rosberg mentioned that they had repaired their friendship and occasionally met, with Hamilton sending generous Christmas gifts to Rosberg's daughters.

== Formula One World Championship results as team-mates ==
=== Summary ===
Driver	Entries	WDCs	Wins	Poles	F/Laps	Podiums	Points
(Germany) Nico Rosberg	78	1	22	29	16	50	1195
(United Kingdom) Lewis Hamilton	78	**2**	**32**	**35**	**19**	**55**	**1334**

The progression of the cumulative point totals of Hamilton and Rosberg across the 2016 season

=== By season ===
Year	Driver	Entries	Wins	Poles	F/Laps	Podiums	Points
2013	(Germany) Nico Rosberg	19	**2**	3	0	4	171
2013	(United Kingdom) Lewis Hamilton	19	1	**5**	**1**	**5**	**189**
2014	(Germany) Nico Rosberg	19	5	**11**	5	15	317
2014	(United Kingdom) Lewis Hamilton	19	**11**	7	**7**	**16**	**384**
2015	(Germany) Nico Rosberg	19	6	7	5	15	322
2015	(United Kingdom) Lewis Hamilton	19	**10**	**11**	**8**	**17**	**381**
2016	(Germany) Nico Rosberg	21	9	8	**6**	16	**385**
2016	(United Kingdom) Lewis Hamilton	21	**10**	**12**	3	**17**	380

=== Complete results ===
(key) (results in bold indicate pole position, results in italics indicate fastest lap)

Year	Driver	1	2	3	4	5	6	7	8	9	10	11	12	13	14	15	16	17	18	19	20	21	Points	WDC
2013		AUS	MAL	CHN	BHR	ESP	MON	CAN	GBR	GER	HUN	BEL	ITA	SIN	KOR	JPN	IND	ABU	USA	BRA				
2013	(Germany) Nico Rosberg	Ret	4	Ret	**9**	**6**	**1**	5	1	9	19^{†}	4	6	4	7	8	2	3	9	5			171	6th
2013	(United Kingdom) Lewis Hamilton	5	3	**3**	5	12	4	3	**4**	**5**	**1**	**3**	9	5	5	Ret	6	7	4	9			189	4th
2014		AUS	MAL	BHR	CHN	ESP	MON	CAN	AUT	GBR	GER	HUN	BEL	ITA	SIN	JPN	RUS	USA	BRA	ABU				
2014	(Germany) Nico Rosberg	1	2	**2**	2	2	**1**	**2**	1	**Ret**	**1**	**4**	**2**	2	Ret	**2**	2	**2**	**1**	**14**			317	2nd
2014	(United Kingdom) Lewis Hamilton	**Ret**	**1**	1	**1**	**1**	2	Ret	2	1	3	3	Ret	**1**	**1**	1	**1**	1	2	1			384	1st
2015		AUS	MAL	CHN	BHR	ESP	MON	CAN	AUT	GBR	HUN	BEL	ITA	SIN	JPN	RUS	USA	MEX	BRA	ABU				
2015	(Germany) Nico Rosberg	2	3	2	3	**1**	1	2	1	2	8	2	17^{†}	4	**2**	**Ret**	**2**	**1**	**1**	**1**			322	2nd
2015	(United Kingdom) Lewis Hamilton	**1**	**2**	**1**	**1**	2	**3**	**1**	**2**	**1**	**6**	**1**	**1**	Ret	1	1	1	2	2	2			381	1st
2016		AUS	BHR	CHN	RUS	ESP	MON	CAN	EUR	AUT	GBR	HUN	GER	BEL	ITA	SIN	MAL	JPN	USA	MEX	BRA	ABU		
2016	(Germany) Nico Rosberg	1	1	**1**	**1**	Ret	7	5	**1**	4	3	**2**	**4**	**1**	1	**1**	3	**1**	2	2	2	2	385	1st
2016	(United Kingdom) Lewis Hamilton	**2**	**3**	7	2	**Ret**	1	**1**	5	**1**	**1**	1	1	3	**2**	3	**Ret**	3	**1**	**1**	**1**	**1**	380	2nd

Notes

- ^{†} – The driver did not finish the Grand Prix, but was classified, as he completed over 90% of the race distance.

== See also ==
- List of sports rivalries
