= 2014 Bahrain GP2 Series round =

Motor race

2014 Bahrain GP2 round
Round details
- Round 1 of 11 rounds in the 2014 GP2 Series
- Layout of the Bahrain International Circuit
- Location: Bahrain International Circuit, Sakhir, Bahrain
- Course: Permanent racing facility 5.406 km (3.359 mi)

GP2 Series

Feature race
- Date: 5 April 2014
- Laps: 32

Pole position
Driver	(United Kingdom) Jolyon Palmer	DAMS
- Time: 1:38.865

Podium
First	(Belgium) Stoffel Vandoorne	ART Grand Prix
Second	(Colombia) Julián Leal	Carlin
Third	(United Kingdom) Jolyon Palmer	DAMS

Fastest lap
Driver	(Russia) Artem Markelov (Note: Artem Markelov set the fastest lap, but did not finish in the top 10, so was ineligible to be the point-scorer for the fastest lap. Jolyon Palmer was the point-scorer instead for setting the fastest lap of those finishing in the top 10.)	RT Russian Time
- Time: 1:43.604 (on lap 24)

Sprint race
- Date: 6 April 2014
- Laps: 23

Podium
First	(United Kingdom) Jolyon Palmer	DAMS
Second	(Switzerland) Simon Trummer	Rapax
Third	(Colombia) Julián Leal	Carlin

Fastest lap
Driver	(United States) Alexander Rossi (Note: Alexander Rossi set the fastest lap, but did not finish in the top 10, so was ineligible to be the point-scorer for the fastest lap. Jolyon Palmer was the point-scorer instead for setting the fastest lap of those finishing in the top 10.)	EQ8 Caterham Racing
- Time: 1:45.344 (on lap 4)

The 2014 Bahrain GP2 Series round was a pair of motor races held on 5 and 6 April 2014 at the Bahrain International Circuit in Sakhir, Bahrain as part of the GP2 Series. It was the first round of the 2014 GP2 Series and was run in support of the 2014 Bahrain Grand Prix. The first race, a 32-lap feature event, was won by ART Grand Prix driver Stoffel Vandoorne after starting from second position. Julián Leal finished second for the Carlin team and DAMS driver Jolyon Palmer took third. Palmer won the shorter 23-lap sprint race from Rapax's Simon Trummer in second and Leal third.

Palmer took pole position in the feature race by recording the fastest lap in qualifying, but wheelspin at the start dropped him behind Vandoorne. A lap three crash between Axcil Jefferies and Kimiya Sato saw the safety car deployed for the next three laps and Vandoorne kept the lead at the restart. He retained it until his pit stop on the ninth lap. Nathanaël Berthon took the lead for nine laps before Trummer took over the position until his lap 30 pit stop. Vandoorne regained the lead and maintained it to win the feature race. Felipe Nasr started from pole position in the sprint race but lost it to Trummer due to a slow start. Palmer passed Trummer for the lead on the second lap and held it to win.

Vandoorne's feature race victory was his first in the GP2 Series and on his maiden start and Palmer's sprint race win was the fourth of his career. The result put Palmer in the lead of the Drivers' Championship with 38 points, ten in front of second-placed Leal. Vandoorne was in third place, with Trummer fourth and Nasr fifth. DAMS became the leaders of the Teams' Championship by four points over Carlin. ART Grand Prix were a further seven points in third position, while Rapax and Racing Engineering were fourth and fifth, with ten rounds left in the season.

== Background ==
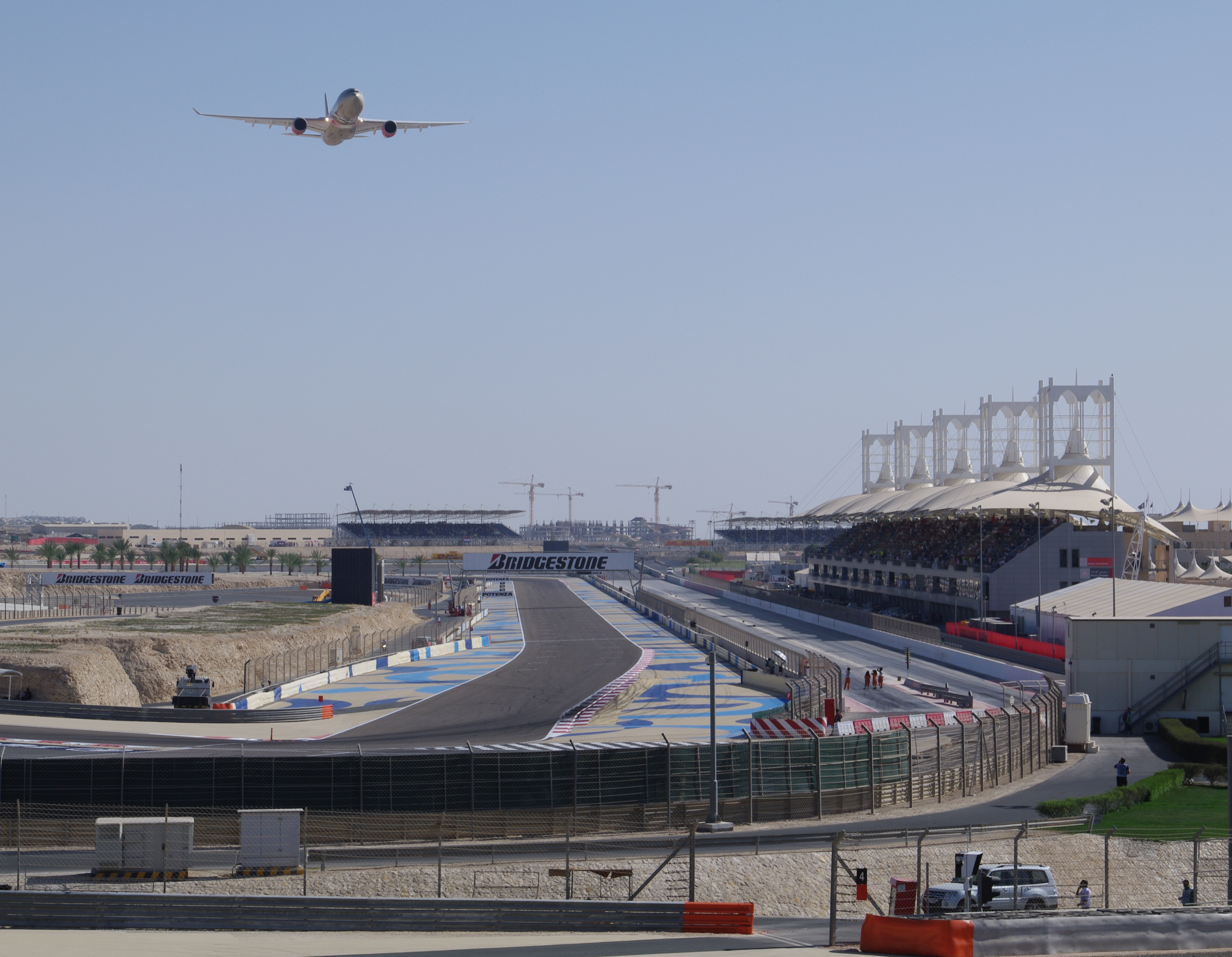
Bahrain International Circuit, where the race was held.

The 2014 Bahrain GP2 Series round was the first of eleven scheduled events in 2014. It was held on 5 and 6 April 2014 at the Bahrain International Circuit in Sakhir, and was run in support of the 2014 Bahrain Grand Prix. Tyre supplier Pirelli brought two types of tyre to the race: two dry compounds (yellow-banded soft "options" and orange-banded hard "primes"). There were a total of 13 teams of 26 participants each entered for both races and each driver piloted the Dallara GP2/11 car.

The final mass test session before the new season took place at the track over 19–21 March. On the first day, Daniel Abt (Hilmer Motorsport) set the fastest lap of the morning session with a time of 1:40.676 which saw the session twice disrupted when Takuya Izawa (ART Grand Prix) stopped on track and Simon Trummer (Rapax) abandoned his car after hitting the turn ten kerb. Alexander Rossi (Caterham Racing) set the quickest lap of the day in the afternoon session with a 1:40.604 lap. Rio Haryanto (Caterham Racing) recorded the fastest lap of the three days, a 1:39.129 in the second day's morning session, and Daniël de Jong (MP Motorsport) paced the afternoon session with a time of 1:40.508. In the third (and final) day, Jon Lancaster (MP Motorsport) was the fastest driver in the morning session with a lap of 1:39.693, and Abt was quickest in the afternoon session with a time of 1:41.061.

== Practice and qualifying ==
One 45-minute practice session was held on Friday before the two races. In the practice session, held in windy conditions and on a dusty track, Russian Time's Mitch Evans was fastest with a time of 1:42.062, six-hundredths of a second faster than ART Grand Prix's Stoffel Vandoorne in second. Raffaele Marciello of Racing Engineering, Abt, Stéphane Richelmi for DAMS, Haryanto. André Negrão of Arden International, Jolyon Palmer in the second DAMS car, Trummer and Conor Daly's Lazarus vehicle completed the top ten ahead of qualifying. Julián Leal understeered off the track and into turn eleven; he spun two corners later. Facu Regalia slid under braking and drove onto the turn thirteen run-off area, while Rossi locked his tyres and ran wide at turn eleven. With two minutes remaining, de Jong stopped on a run-off area leaving the first turn and practice ended early because of the limited amount of time available.

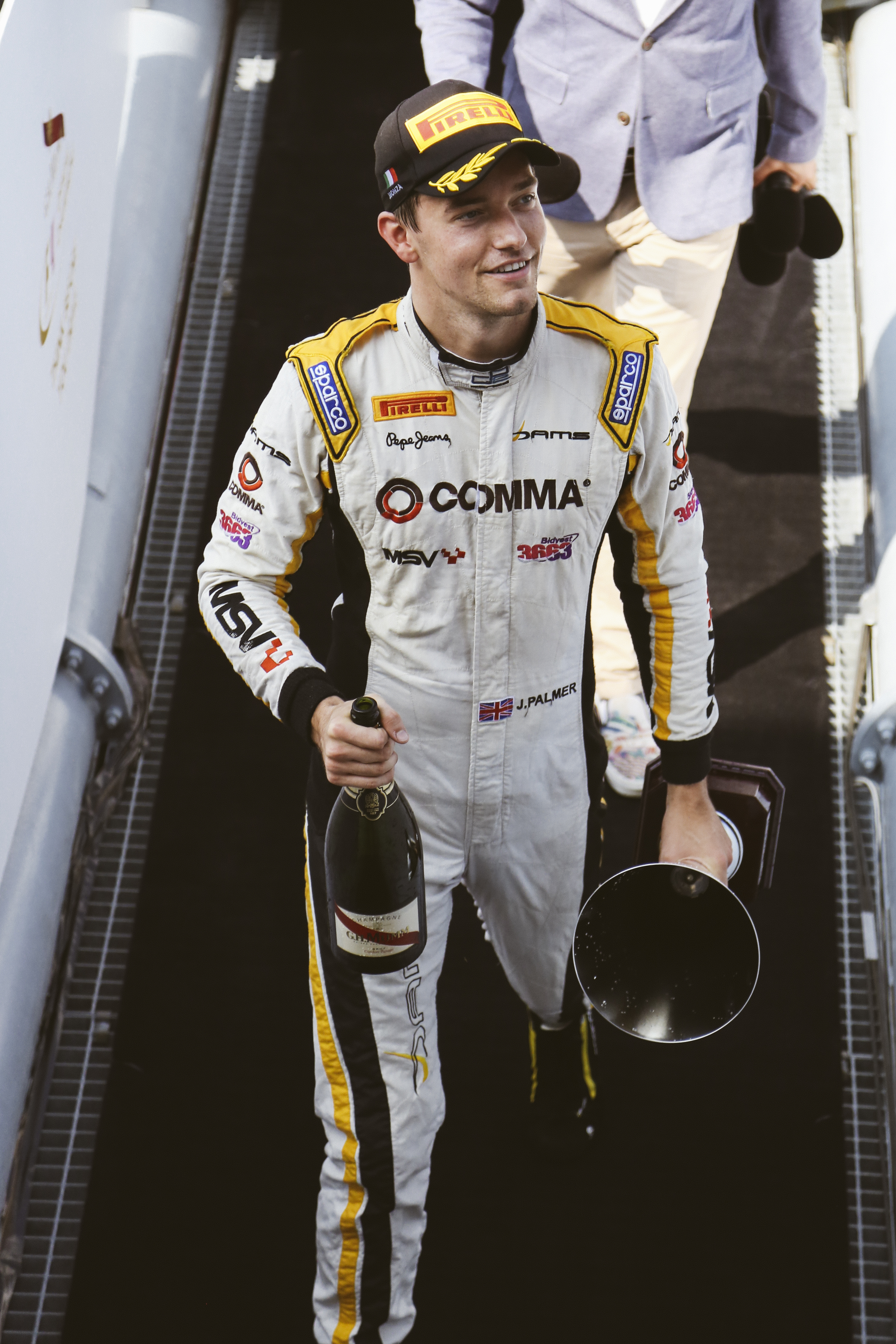
Jolyon Palmer (pictured at Monza later in the season) had the second pole position of his GP2 Series career.

Friday evening's qualifying session ran for 30-minutes. The drivers' fastest lap times determined the starting order for the first race. The pole position winner earned four points for the Drivers' and Teams' Championships. In contrast to previous years, qualifying was held at night, the first such occurrence in the GP2 Series. The track was less dusty than it had been in practice, and multiple drivers had pole position throughout the session. Palmer clinched his first pole position of the season and the second of his GP2 Series career with a time of 1:38.865. He flat spotted his first set of tyres and was aware the second set equipped would aid his challenge for pole position. Palmer was joined on the grid's front row by Vandoorne, who was temporarily investigated by the stewards for exceeding track limits at turn 13, but no action was taken. Abt took third having been unable to improve on his lap time. Richelmi improved towards the end of qualifying and was fourth. Haryanto took fifth ahead of sixth-placed Stefano Coletti. Early pace setter Evans fell to seventh as others went faster.

In the closing minutes, Carlin's Felipe Nasr was on a fast lap and closed up to Johnny Cecotto Jr.'s slow Trident car on the racing line through the fourth corner and appeared to execute a sudden manoeuvre resulting in Nasr gesticulating to Cecotto. The stewards deemed Nasr at fault and he incurred a three-grid penalty. Hence, Marciello, Arthur Pic for Campos Racing and Lancaster were ninth and tenth. Leal was the fastest driver not to have received a penalty who was unable to qualify in the top ten. He was followed by Cecotto and Negrão in 13th and 14th. Rossi could not replicate his earlier form and was 15th. Kimiya Sato of Campos Racing in 16th, was closely followed by René Binder of Arden International and Daly. Regalia was 19th, Lazarus' Nathanaël Berthon was 20th and Trummer took 21st. He was followed by de Jong who lost control under braking on cold tyres late in the session. Izaka was 23rd followed by Rapax's Adrian Quaife-Hobbs. Trident's Axcil Jefferies, 25th, lost control of his car's rear while others got their tyres to their optimum temperature early on. Artem Markelov (Russian Time) started from the back of the grid after a spin on cold tyres. This was caused by him running over the turn one kerb. Markelov stalled his car and the session was red flagged to allow the marshals to move his car off the racing line.

=== Qualifying classification ===
Pos.	No.	Driver	Team	Time	Gap	Grid
1	7	(United Kingdom) Jolyon Palmer	DAMS	1:38.865	—	1
2	10	(Belgium) Stoffel Vandoorne	ART Grand Prix	1:38.895	+0.030	2
3	11	(Germany) Daniel Abt	Hilmer Motorsport	1:39.073	+0.208	3
4	8	(Monaco) Stéphane Richelmi	DAMS	1:39.081	+0.216	4
5	18	(Indonesia) Rio Haryanto	EQ8 Caterham Racing	1:39.228	+0.363	5
6	6	(Monaco) Stefano Coletti	Racing Engineering	1:39.271	+0.406	6
7	1	(New Zealand) Mitch Evans	RT Russian Time	1:39.274	+0.409	7
8	3	(Brazil) Felipe Nasr	Carlin	1:39.301	+0.436	11^{1}
9	5	(Italy) Raffaele Marciello	Racing Engineering	1:39.449	+0.584	8
10	26	(France) Arthur Pic	Campos Racing	1:39.462	+0.597	9
11	21	(United Kingdom) Jon Lancaster	MP Motorsport	1:39.507	+0.642	10
12	4	(Colombia) Julián Leal	Carlin	1:39.588	+0.723	12
13	23	(Venezuela) Johnny Cecotto Jr.	Trident	1:39.615	+0.750	13
14	17	(Brazil) André Negrão	Arden International	1:39.647	+0.782	14
15	19	(United States) Alexander Rossi	EQ8 Caterham Racing	1:39.651	+0.786	15
16	27	(Japan) Kimiya Sato	Campos Racing	1:39.749	+0.884	16
17	16	(Austria) René Binder	Arden International	1:39.788	+0.923	17
18	25	(United States) Conor Daly	Venezuela GP Lazarus	1:39.848	+0.983	18
19	12	(Argentina) Facu Regalia	Hilmer Motorsport	1:39.881	+1.016	19
20	24	(France) Nathanaël Berthon	Venezuela GP Lazarus	1:39.928	+1.063	20
21	15	(Switzerland) Simon Trummer	Rapax	1:40.059	+1.194	21
22	20	(Netherlands) Daniël de Jong	MP Motorsport	1:40.060	+1.195	22
23	9	(Japan) Takuya Izawa	ART Grand Prix	1:40.401	+1.536	23
24	14	(United Kingdom) Adrian Quaife-Hobbs	Rapax	1:40.408	+1.543	24
25	22	(Zimbabwe) Axcil Jefferies	Trident	1:40.619	+1.754	25
26	2	(Russia) Artem Markelov	RT Russian Time	1:41.172	+2.307	26

Notes:

- ^1 — Felipe Nasr was given a three-place grid penalty for blocking Johnny Cecotto Jr. during qualifying.

== Races ==
The first race was held over 170 km (110 mi) or 60 minutes (which ever came first) and all drivers were required by regulations to make one pit stop. The first ten finishers scored points, with two given to the fastest lap holder. The grid for the second race was determined by the finishing order of the first but the first eight drivers were in reverse order of where they finished. It was run for 120 km (75 mi) or 45 minutes (which ever came first) and, in contrast to the first race, drivers were not required to make pit stops. The top eight finishers earned points towards their respective championships.

=== Feature race ===
The weather at the start of the first race on 5 April were dry and sunny with an air temperature of 27 °C (81 °F) and a track temperature at 52 °C (126 °F). All of the leaders started on the soft compound tyres. Tyre degradation was predicted to be a major factor in the event, and Pirelli believed that the hard compound tyre would last an entire race without issue, although most of the lower starting drivers using this tyre were highly anticipated to create traffic problems. Trummer stalled as the formation lap began and was required to start from the pit lane. When the race commenced at 13:10 Arabia Standard Time (UTC+3), Palmer spun his wheels and Vandoorne overtook him to lead the field into the first corner. Richelmi and Coletti passed Palmer and Abt to move into second and third places. Regalia battled for position on the first lap but sustained a broken front suspension from an impact with Cecotto after exiting turn four which forced Regalia to retire from the race early. Palmer fell to sixth and battled Nasr for the position. Evans overtook Haryanto for fourth place at the first turn at the start of the second lap.

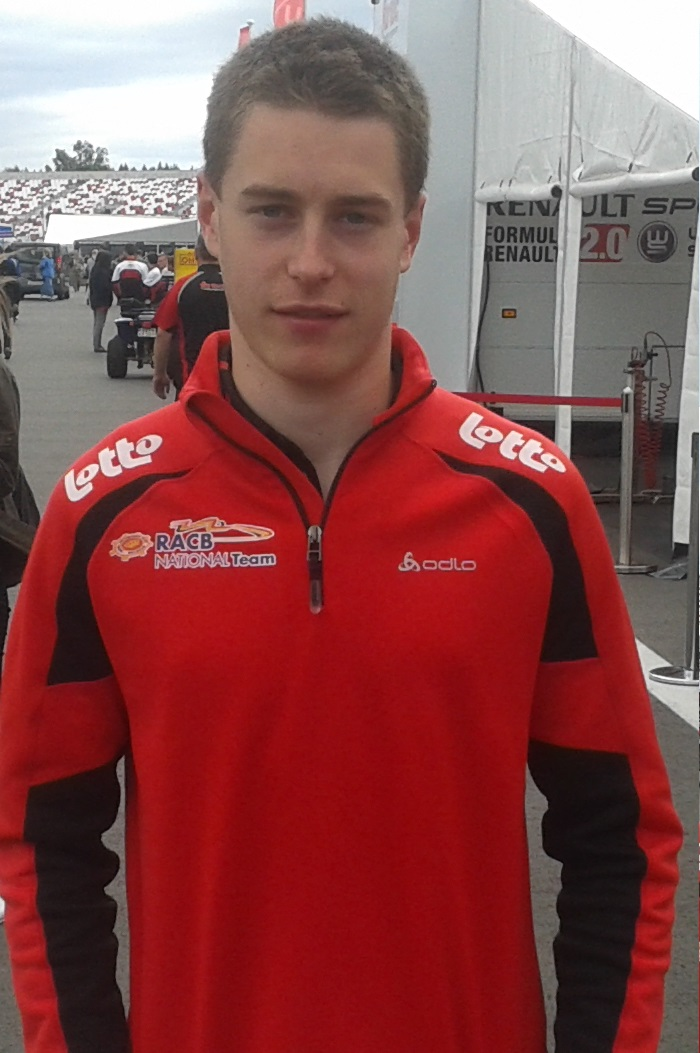
Stoffel Vandoorne (pictured in 2013) won his first GP2 Series race on his debut in the series.

On the following lap, a large crash necessitated the deployment of the safety car. Jefferies defended his position from Sato on the straight linking turns three and four and Sato hit Jefferies's rear. Sato punted Jefferies into a collision with the wall at high speed. Jefferies's vehicle then slid across the tarmac at turn one and stopped in the gravel trap without collecting any other cars. Jefferies was unhurt. At the lap six restart, Vandoorne kept the lead but Richelmi, Coletti, Haryanto and Nasr elected to make pit stops for the mandatory change to the hard compound tyre. Evans and Palmer made their pit stops on the following lap, though Vandoorne committed himself to making track position pay off and extended his advantage to five seconds in front of Pic. Richelmi lost positions but his teammate Palmer moved back up the field and into third place. Nasr became disgruntled when Cecotto forced him to the side of the track battling for position. Vandoorne ceded first to Berthon at the end of lap nine when he made his pit stop and rejoined with a two-second advantage over Palmer.

Haryanto passed Coletti for fourth place at the first corner. Sato took a ten-second stop-and-go penalty on lap 13 for his role in the lap three accident with Jeffries. Trummer use a battle between Binder and Izawa and passed the duo with the same pass in the opening corners for third place on the 14th lap. He passed Daly for second position two laps later. Bertbon entered the pit lane from the lead on lap 18 and narrowly avoided a collision with Trummer as he attempted to enter the pit lane. After leaving the pit lane, Berthon was affected by wheel nut problem that caused him to slow with a suspected loose wheel before returning to the pit lane. Leal was heavily delayed by Markelov allowing Palmer to pull away. Meanwhile, Trummer stayed on track and lost small amounts of his pace by pushing hard. Vandoorne reduced Trummer's lead to eight seconds by the time Trummer made his pit stop at the end of lap 30. He was followed by Coletti, Pic and Nasr with the late-stopping Quaife-Hobbs and Izama moving through the field courtesy of having newer soft compound tyres installed on their cars.

Leal attacked Palmer and passed him by braking later on the inside at turn one for second position. Trummer emerged from the pit lane in tenth with two laps left and had the advantage of the newest set of soft compound tyres enabling him to pass Quaife-Hobbs, Nasr and Binder on the final lap and settle for seventh place. Vandoorne maintained the lead and crossed the start/finish line after 32 laps to take his maiden GP2 Series win on his debut. Leal finished second, 1 1/2 seconds behind and Palmer held off Coletti for third. Debutants Pic and Izawa finished in fifth and sixth places; the latter narrowly held off Trummer on the main straight. Nasr, Binder and Quaife-Hobbs made up positions eight through ten. De Jong, Daly, Abt, Evans and Markelov, Haryanto, Lancaster, Marciello, Richelmi, Negrão, Cecotto, Rossi and Berthon were the final classified finishers.

=== Feature race classification ===
Drivers who scored championship points are denoted in bold.

Pos.	No.	Driver	Team	Laps	Time/Retired	Grid	Points
1	10	(Belgium) **Stoffel Vandoorne**	**ART Grand Prix**	32	59:57.411	2	25
2	4	(Colombia) **Julián Leal**	**Carlin**	32	+1.551	12	18
3	7	(United Kingdom) **Jolyon Palmer**	**DAMS**	32	+5.880	1	(15+4+2)
4	6	(Monaco) **Stefano Coletti**	**Racing Engineering**	32	+6.317	6	12
5	26	(France) **Arthur Pic**	**Campos Racing**	32	+15.100	10	10
6	9	(Japan) **Takuya Izawa**	**ART Grand Prix**	32	+21.729	23	8
7	15	(Switzerland) **Simon Trummer**	**Rapax**	32	+21.979	PL^{2}	6
8	3	(Brazil) **Felipe Nasr**	**Carlin**	32	+24.425	8	4
9	16	(Austria) **René Binder**	**Arden International**	32	+24.861	17	2
10	14	(United Kingdom) **Adrian Quaife-Hobbs**	**Rapax**	32	+26.194	24	1
11	20	(Netherlands) Daniël de Jong	MP Motorsport	32	+27.034	22	
12	25	(United States) Conor Daly	Venezuela GP Lazarus	32	+31.931	18	
13	11	(Germany) Daniel Abt	Hilmer Motorsport	32	+36.231	22	
14	1	(New Zealand) Mitch Evans	RT Russian Time	32	+36.997	7	
15	2	(Russia) Artem Markelov	RT Russian Time	32	+41.030	26	
16	18	(Indonesia) Rio Haryanto	EQ8 Caterham Racing	32	+41.714	5	
17	21	(United Kingdom) Jon Lancaster	MP Motorsport	32	+42.412	11	
18	5	(Italy) Raffaele Marciello	Racing Engineering	32	+46.849	9	
19	8	(Monaco) Stéphane Richelmi	DAMS	32	+49.656	4	
20	17	(Brazil) André Negrão	Arden International	32	+1:02.346	14	
21	23	(Venezuela) Johnny Cecotto Jr.	Trident	32	+1:13.454	13	
22	19	(United States) Alexander Rossi	EQ8 Caterham Racing	32	+1:34.560	15	
23	24	(France) Nathanaël Berthon	Venezuela GP Lazarus	30	Did not finish	20	
Ret	27	(Japan) Kimiya Sato	Campos Racing	27	Did not finish	16	
Ret	22	(Zimbabwe) Axcil Jefferies	Trident	2	Collision	25	
Ret	12	(Argentina) Facu Regalia	Hilmer Motorsport	0	Suspension	19	
Fastest lap: Artem Markelov (RT Russian Time) — 1:43.604 (on lap 24)

Notes:

- **^2** — Simon Trummer started from the pit lane after his car got stuck on the starting grid at the start of the formation lap.

=== Sprint race ===
The second race on 6 April began at 14:15 local time. The weather at the start of the race was hot and sunny with an air temperature of 28 °C (82 °F) and a track temperature at 51 °C (124 °F). All drivers chose to begin on the hard compound tyres. Vandoorne's access cover above his car's pedals detached on an installation lap into turn four, prompting his mechanics to apply tape over it. Tyre preservation was key since temperatures for the sprint race were higher than the previous day's feature event. For the second day running, it was not the pole sitter who led the field entering the first corner as Nasr spun his wheels and Trummer took the lead as Palmer moved into second. Leal moved from seventh to third, and Quaife-Hobbs settled into fourth position. Coletti stalled on the grid and drivers were forced to swerve to avoid hitting his stationary car. Coletti and Maricello's cars were pushed into the pit lane by mechanics to allow them to start. Vandoorne made a slow start and fell to eleventh. At the beginning of lap two, Trummer was unable to hold off Palmer who slipstreamed him on the main straight and lost the lead into the first turn.

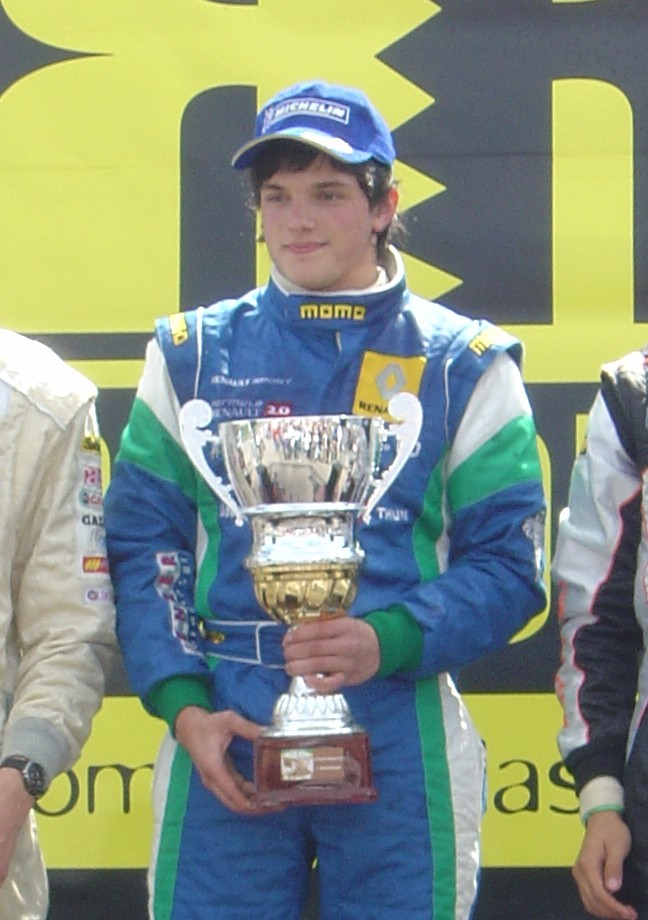
Simon Trummer (pictured in 2008) led the first lap before Palmer passed him. He finished second to clinch his first podium result since the 2009 International Formula Master.

Further down the field that same lap, Vandoorne passed his teammate Izawa before striking the rear of de Jong's car at turn four, damaging his front wing and slowing Vandoorne, who was forced into the sand by the faster Markelov before he could enter the pit lane for repairs and fell out of the top ten. Rossi sustained a puncture on the third lap and was required to make an unscheduled pit stop for soft compound tyres in an attempt to set the fastest lap. Since no mandatory pit stops had to be made, Palmer still led though Trummer was less than a second behind him. Leal was close by despite raising concerns over suspected damage to his car. Evans passed de Jong for eighth place on lap six while Haryanto fell behind Izawa, Daly and Markelow by the 11th lap. By the halfway point, questions were raised about which drivers used their tyres too hard early on and who used their compounds economically with the view for an late attack. The primary action at this point was Abt and Berthon battling for 15th place and both drivers caught Marciello's lapped car. Daly retired on lap 15 after sustaining a possible puncture caused by driving over a turning vane from Binder's car ahead of him.

The first three runners were separated by less than two seconds with six laps left. Palmer and Leal received frequent reminders to preserve their tyres, while Trummer was informed over the radio that to have any hopes of winning the race he had to attack. Quaife-Hobbs slowed because his tyres had degraded enough to enable Nasr to close up to him. Their battle allowed Pic, Richelmi, Evans and Binder to close up causing jostling and minor contact between all six cars. Nasr initially passed Quaife-Hobbs at the final corner on the 30th lap but Quaife-Hobbs reclaimed fourth place into the first turn. Nasr slipstreamed past Quaife-Hobbs on the outside into turn four. On the final lap, Richelmi overtook Pic at turn eight for fifth place while Pic and Markelov lost positions to Evans and Binder. Trummer was unable to overhaul Palmer who kept the lead for the rest of the race to achieve his fourth victory in the GP2 Series. Trummer followed eight-tenths of a second later in second for his first podium finish since the 2009 International Formula Master. Leal was a further six-tenths of a second behind in third, with Nasr fourth and Richelmi fifth. Quaife-Hobbs, Evans and Binder were in sixth to eighth. Pic, Markelov, de Jong, Izawa, Abt, Cecotto, Lancaster, Haryanto, Berthon, Negrão, Sato and Regalia, Vandoorne, Coletti, Marciello and Rossi were the last of the 25 classified finishers.

=== Sprint race classification ===
Drivers who scored championship points are denoted in bold.

Pos.	No.	Driver	Team	Laps	Time/Retired	Grid	Points
1	7	(United Kingdom) **Jolyon Palmer**	**DAMS**	23	41:02.484	6	(15+2)
2	15	(Switzerland) **Simon Trummer**	**Rapax**	23	+0.809	2	12
3	4	(Colombia) **Julián Leal**	**Carlin**	23	+1.430	7	10
4	3	(Brazil) **Felipe Nasr**	**Carlin**	23	+8.719	1	8
5	8	(Monaco) **Stéphane Richelmi**	**DAMS**	23	+16.416	19	6
6	14	(United Kingdom) **Adrian Quaife-Hobbs**	**Rapax**	23	+17.680	10	4
7	1	(New Zealand) **Mitch Evans**	**RT Russian Time**	23	+18.012	14	2
8	16	(Austria) **René Binder**	**Arden International**	23	+19.791	9	1
9	26	(France) Arthur Pic	Campos Racing	23	+19.977	4	
10	2	(Russia) Artem Markelov	RT Russian Time	23	+20.678	15	
11	20	(Netherlands) Daniël de Jong	MP Motorsport	23	+21.086	11	
12	9	(Japan) Takuya Izawa	ART Grand Prix	23	+21.713	3	
13	11	(Germany) Daniel Abt	Hilmer Motorsport	23	+29.171	13	
14	23	(Venezuela) Johnny Cecotto Jr.	Trident	23	+33.500	21	
15	21	(United Kingdom) Jon Lancaster	MP Motorsport	23	+34.017	17	
16	18	(Indonesia) Rio Haryanto	EQ8 Caterham Racing	23	+35.778	16	
17	24	(France) Nathanaël Berthon	Venezuela GP Lazarus	23	+38.028	23	
18	17	(Brazil) André Negrão	Arden International	23	+38.524	20	
19	27	(Japan) Kimiya Sato	Campos Racing	23	+39.439	24	
20	12	(Argentina) Facu Regalia	Hilmer Motorsport	23	+44.065	26	
21	22	(Zimbabwe) Axcil Jefferies	Trident	23	+48.583	25	
22	10	(Belgium) Stoffel Vandoorne	ART Grand Prix	23	+49.324	8	
23	6	(Monaco) Stefano Coletti	Racing Engineering	23	+1:20.944	5	
24	5	(Italy) Raffaele Marciello	Racing Engineering	22	+1 lap	18	
25	19	(United States) Alexander Rossi	EQ8 Caterham Racing	22	+1 lap	22	
Ret	25	(United States) Conor Daly	Venezuela GP Lazarus	16	Damage	12	
Fastest lap: Alexander Rossi (EQ8 Caterham Racing) — 1:45.344 (on lap 4)

== Post-race ==
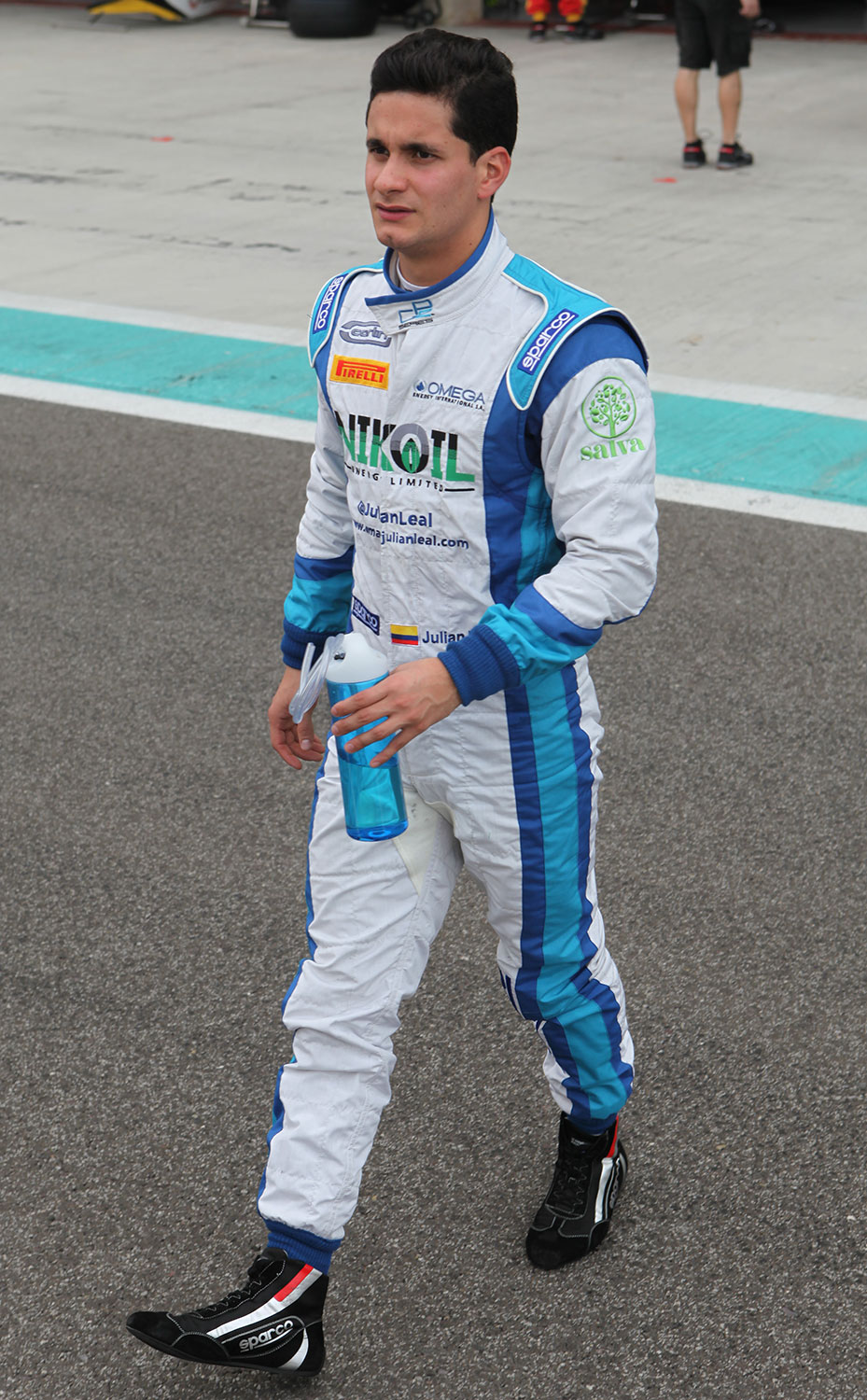
Julián Leal (pictured at the first pre-season test in Abu Dhabi) performed strongly in both races and stood ten points behind Palmer in the Drivers' Championship.

The top three drivers of both races appeared on the podium to collect their trophies and in a later press conference. At the podium interviews were conducted by reporter Will Buxton. After the feature race, Vandoorne believed he could have probably run longer with the soft-compound tyres but chose to enter the pit lane to ensure he would keep the lead and felt his team made the correct decision, "We just wanted to be safe and keep the lead because we already had made two more laps than the others on the soft tyres." Leal was delighted to finish second and did not believe he could have finished in the position because of where he started but his team noted his pace was strong throughout pre-season testing, "It’s great that we were able to replicate that and get here today.” He said his engineer told him to push for two laps gaining him positions and was not attempting to attack Palmer but passed him by conserving his tyres towards the end of the race. Third-place finisher Palmer spoke of his disappointment because he felt his team could have challenged for the victory but praised the strategy that moved him up the field. He admitted that work needed done on his starts but did not change his strategy after his slow getaway.

When the sprint race had finished, Palmer said on the podium, "Yesterday was first to sixth in one lap and now it is sixth to first so it definitely made up for it and I am absolutely delighted. We had done a lot of homework on the start and the tyre degradation and I think we nailed them both. He described the race as "tough" and drove more conservatively with the knowledge he acculmated from the previous day's race and also made set-up and balance changes. Trummer said it felt "really good" to finish second and knew beforehand he would achieve a good result in the sprint race. He commented he did not defend too much against Palmer on the second lap because of his speed and was aware he had to conserve tyre life, adding, "But I was a bit wrong because he kept this strong pace all race long. Even at the end of the race I thought he would struggle more but he didn’t. It was really hard to attack him. That was a great race. I had a great pace and I’m happy with P2." Third-place finisher Leal spoke of an "unbelievable" start of the season for himself and his team but focused attention on the following event.

Following this, the first round of the season, Palmer led the Drivers' Championship with 38 points, ten ahead of second-placed Leal. Vandoorne was in third on 25 points, with Trummer a further seven points behind in fourth, and Nasr was fifth with 12 points. DAMS assumed the lead of the Teams' Championship with 44 points; Carlin was close behind in second with 40 points. ART Grand Prix was in third place on 33 points with Rapax ten points behind in fourth place. Racing Engineering were in fifth on 12 points with ten rounds left in the season.

== Standings after the round ==
Drivers' Championship standings

+/–	Pos	Driver	Points
	1	(United Kingdom) Jolyon Palmer	38
	2	(Colombia) Julián Leal	28
	3	(Belgium) Stoffel Vandoorne	25
	4	(Switzerland) Simon Trummer	18
	5	(Brazil) Felipe Nasr	12

Teams' Championship standings

+/–	Pos	Team	Points
	1	(France) DAMS	44
	2	(United Kingdom) Carlin	40
	3	(France) ART Grand Prix	33
	4	(Italy) Rapax	23
	5	(Spain) Racing Engineering	12

- Note: Only the top five positions are included for both sets of standings.

== Notes ==
Previous round: 2013 Yas Marina GP2 Series round	GP2 Series; 2014 season	Next round: 2014 Catalunya GP2 Series round
Previous round: 2013 Bahrain GP2 Series round	Bahrain GP2 round	Next round: 2015 Bahrain GP2 Series round
