= 2014 Bahrain Grand Prix =

Race 3 of 19 in the 2014 Formula One World Championship
← Previous race	Next race →
- Layout of the Bahrain International Circuit

Race details
- Date: 6 April 2014
- Official name: 2014 Formula 1 Gulf Air Bahrain Grand Prix
- Location: Bahrain International Circuit, Sakhir, Bahrain
- Course: Permanent racing facility
- Course length: 5.412 km (3.363 miles)
- Distance: 57 laps, 308.238 km (191.530 (Note: There is a 0.246 km (0.153 mi) offset between the start and finish lines.) miles)
- Weather: Dry
- Attendance: 85,000 (Weekend) 38,140 (Race Day)

Pole position
Driver	(Germany) Nico Rosberg	Mercedes
- Time: 1:33.185

Fastest lap
Driver	(Germany) Nico Rosberg	Mercedes
- Time: 1:37.020 on lap 49

Podium
First	(United Kingdom) Lewis Hamilton	Mercedes
Second	(Germany) Nico Rosberg	Mercedes
Third	(Mexico) Sergio Pérez	Force India-Mercedes

The 2014 Bahrain Grand Prix (formally the 2014 Formula 1 Gulf Air Bahrain Grand Prix) was a Formula One motor race held on 6 April 2014 at the Bahrain International Circuit in Sakhir, Bahrain. It was the third round of the 2014 Formula One World Championship, the 900th Formula One World Championship event, the 11th Bahrain Grand Prix and the first time that the race was held at night. Mercedes driver Lewis Hamilton won the 57-lap race starting from second position. His teammate Nico Rosberg finished second and Force India driver Sergio Pérez took third. It was Hamilton's second victory of the season and the 24th of his Formula One career.

Going into the event, Rosberg led the World Drivers' Championship and his team Mercedes led the World Constructors' Championship. Rosberg qualified on pole position by setting the fastest lap time in the third qualifying session. Hamilton accelerated faster than Rosberg off the line and overtook him at the first corner. Both Mercedes drivers pulled away from the rest of the field and Rosberg conserved fuel which allowed him to attack Hamilton before the first round of pit stops on lap 19 with his teammate successfully defending the lead. He extended his advantage over Rosberg over the next 22 laps before an incident between Pastor Maldonado of Lotus and Sauber's Esteban Gutiérrez caused the safety car to be deployed and his lead was reduced to nothing. Following instructions to bring the cars safely to the finish, Rosberg immediately battled Hamilton for first place, but was unable to get ahead of him and Hamilton maintained a steady advantage when his teammate's soft compound tyres were worn out to win the race.

The result reduced Rosberg's lead over Hamilton in the World Drivers' Championship to 11 championship points. Nico Hülkenberg moved from sixth to third after finishing in fifth place, while Ferrari's Fernando Alonso and McLaren's Jenson Button fell one place each to round out the top five. Mercedes increased their advantage in the World Constructors' Championship to be 68 championship points ahead of second-placed Force India who moved from fifth to second because of their strong result. McLaren were third with Red Bull and Ferrari in positions four and five with 16 races left in the season.

== Background ==
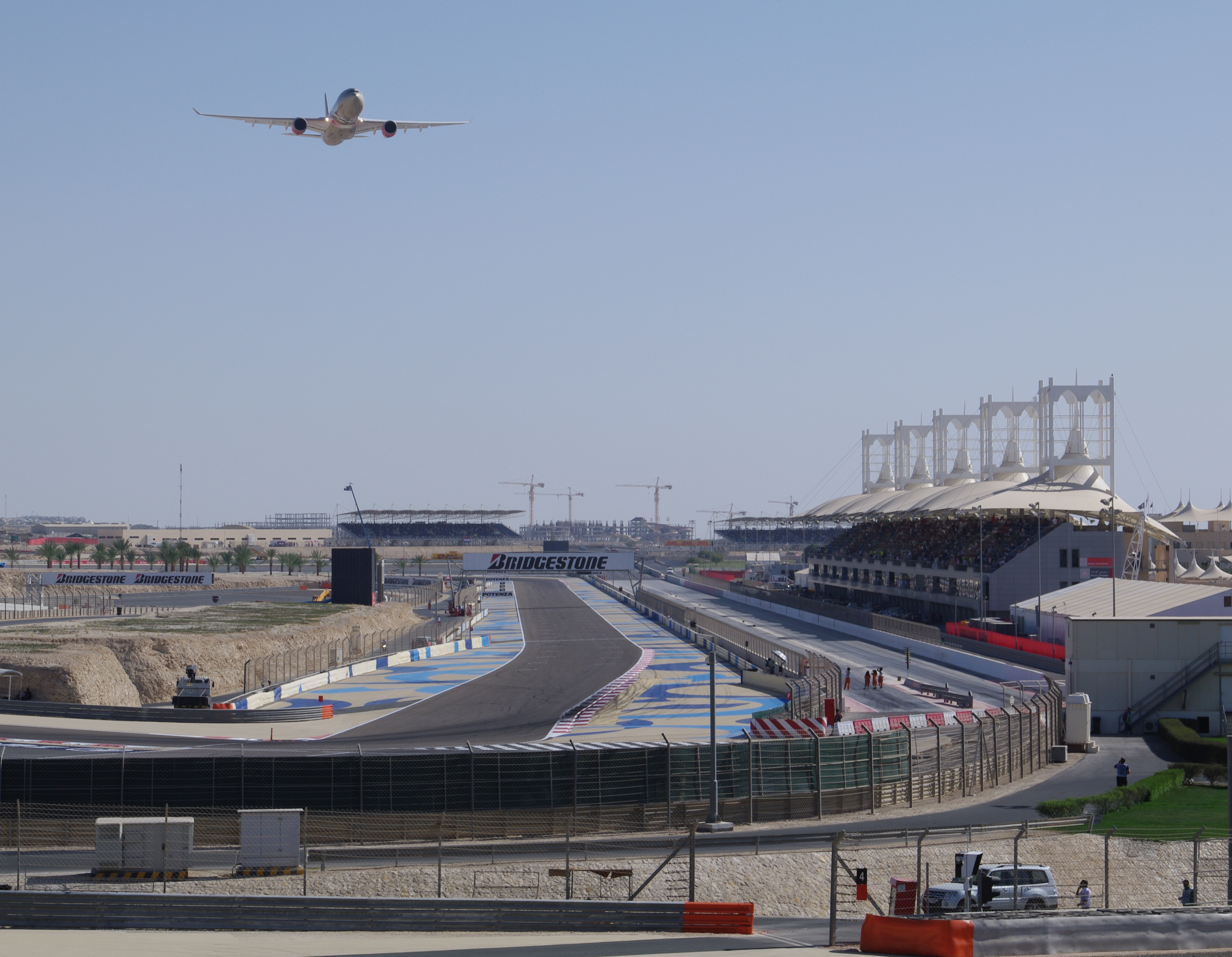
Bahrain International Circuit, where the race was held.

The 2014 Bahrain Grand Prix was the third of 19 scheduled rounds of the 2014 Formula One World Championship, the 11th running of the event, as well as the 900th Formula One World Championship race. It was held on 6 April 2014 at the Bahrain International Circuit in Sakhir, Bahrain. Tyre supplier Pirelli brought two types of tyre to the race: two dry compounds (soft "options" and medium "primes"). The drag reduction system (DRS) had two activation zones for the race: one was on the straight between turns 10 and 11, and the second was on the start/finish straight from the final to the first corners.

Going into the race, Mercedes driver Nico Rosberg led the World Drivers' Championship with 43 championship points, ahead of teammate Lewis Hamilton in second, and Ferrari's Fernando Alonso in third place. Jenson Button was fourth on 23 championship points, three ahead of his McLaren teammate Kevin Magnussen in fifth. Mercedes were leading the World Constructors' Championship with 68 championship points, McLaren were in second on 43 championship points. Ferrari were third on 30 championship points, while Williams (20) and Force India (19) contended for fourth place.

With the potential of a title challenge between the two Mercedes drivers, Hamilton felt their relationship would be unaffected by the race, noting that the two had a healthy working association. Rosberg said that he recognised that his relationship with Hamilton could change as the season progressed, noting that the two drivers had battled for a championship when they were competing in go-karts. He was confident they would work through the circumstances. Hamilton aimed to secure his first victory at the circuit, while Rosberg stated that he enjoyed racing at the track and hoped to continue his recent momentum in the race. Red Bull team principal Christian Horner felt the power advantage of both Mercedes cars would possibly be greater because of the Bahrain International Circuit being a "power-dominated" track. He believed the country's hot climate would affect his team's chances, but said they would attempt to make progress during the race weekend.

In January 2014, an alliance of Bahraini human rights organisations including the Bahrain Centre for Human Rights (BCHR) and the Bahrain Youth Society for Human Rights wrote to Jean Todt, the president of the sport's governing body, the Fédération Internationale de l'Automobile (FIA), requesting that the Bahrain Grand Prix be suspended until the FIA's Ethics Committee could investigate the impact the race has on human rights in Bahrain. According to the BCHR no response was received from the FIA. Reports from the race meeting indicated that thousands of people attended a rally held on the Friday before the race itself outside the Bahraini capital of Manama protesting against the Grand Prix and the government. Clashes between protesters and police took place following the demonstration.

In October 2013, it was revealed by former McLaren team principal Martin Whitmarsh that the race would occur between the early part of the evening and nightfall saying he had observed plans for the idea. This was confirmed by the race organisers one month later as part of an effort to celebrate the tenth anniversary of the event's first running. Its floodlighting system was tested at the 2013 6 Hours of Bahrain. Following the success of the trial, it was later confirmed on 5 April by the chairperson of the Bahrain International Circuit, Zayed Al Zayani, that the Bahrain Grand Prix would remain a night race for future seasons. Sunday is a work day in Bahrain so scheduling the race in the evening resulted in sharply higher ticket sales. That, along with the investment in lighting, made it certain that all Grand Prix races in Bahrain would be evening events.

There were a total of 11 teams (each representing a different constructor) each fielded two race drivers for the event. Three drivers made their first appearances of the season in a Formula One car during the first practice session. Felipe Nasr drove in place of Williams driver Valtteri Bottas, the Sauber of Esteban Gutiérrez was taken over by Giedo van der Garde, and Robin Frijns utilised Kamui Kobayashi's Caterham.

== Practice ==
There were practice sessions—two 90-minute sessions on Friday and a third one-hour on Saturday—preceding Sunday's race. Hamilton lapped fastest in the first practice session at 1:37.502; Rosberg, Alonso, Nico Hülkenberg, Button, Kimi Räikkönen, Magnussen, Daniil Kvyat, Sergio Pérez and Sebastian Vettel were in positions two to ten. In the second practice session, held in cooler weather, Hamilton recorded the day's fastest lap of 1:34.325, with teammate Rosberg in second. Alonso, Daniel Ricciardo, Felipe Massa, Vettel, Magnussen, Pérez and Bottas followed in the top ten. Pastor Maldonado damaged his car after it went airborne from striking the turn four exit kerbs, and Max Chilton lost control of his Marussia braking for the same corner due to a front-left brake disc failure. Pérez swerved to avoid hitting Rosberg who slowed in the 13th and 14th turns. The stewards reprimanded Rosberg, while Gutiérrez was not penalised for impeding Massa in the same area. The turn four kerb was removed by course officials following complaints from several drivers. The FIA's race director Charlie Whiting wrote to all teams warning that the track limits would be strictly enforced in the event any driver was shown to gain an advantage by going over this area. Several cars ran wide at the entry of turn 11 during the second session because of a breezy tail wind on the backstraight. Hamilton set the fastest lap with a time of 1:35.324, ahead of Rosberg, Pérez. Bottas, Massa, Button, Alonso, Hülkenberg, Kvyat and Räikkönen. Vettel missed the session's final 20 minutes because he spun at the second turn's exit and beached his car in the corner's gravel trap.

== Qualifying ==
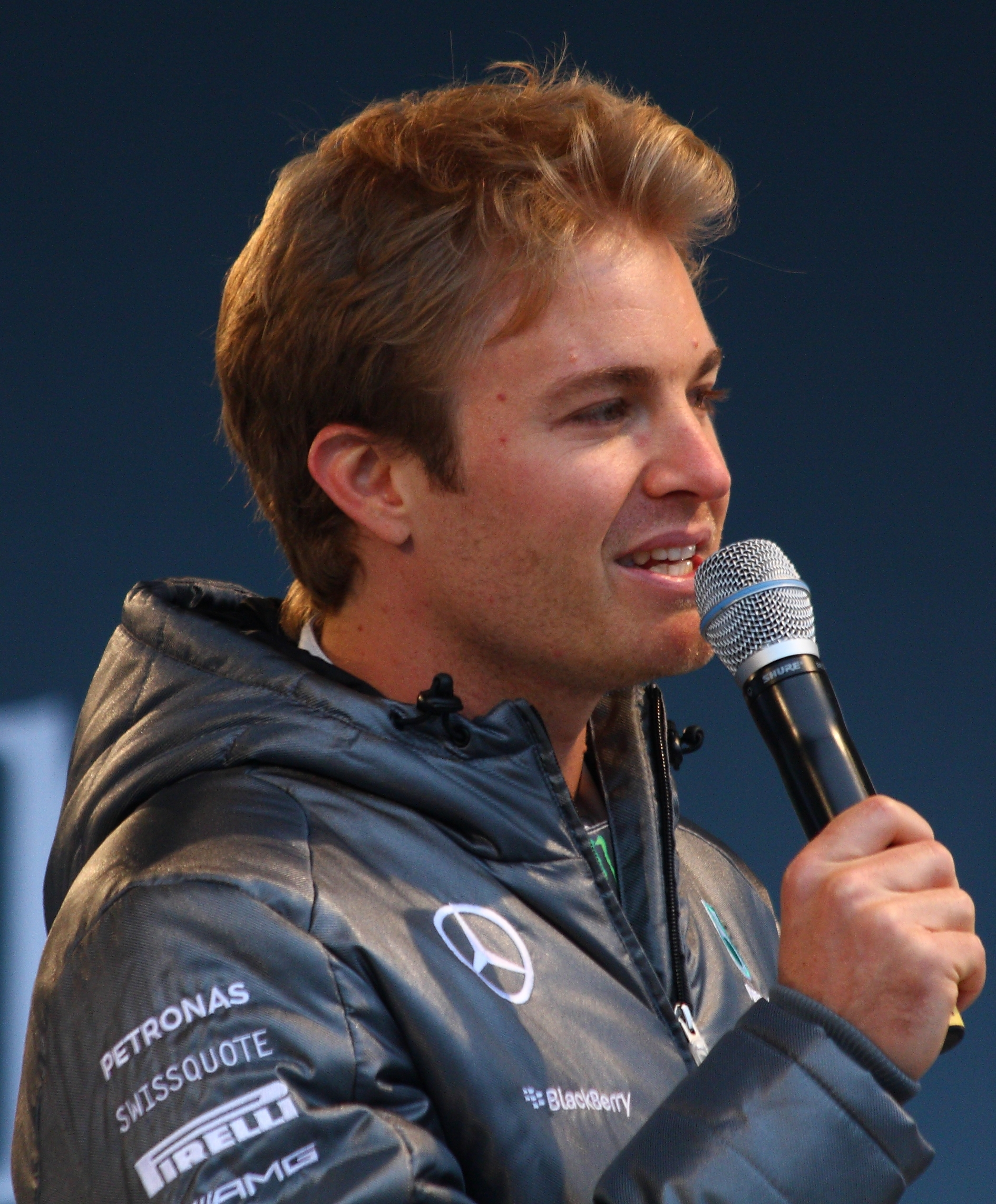
Nico Rosberg had the fifth pole position of his career.

Saturday evening's qualifying session was divided into three parts. The first part ran for 18 minutes, eliminating cars that finished 17th or below. The 107% rule was in effect, requiring drivers to reach a time within 107 per cent of the quickest lap to qualify. The second session lasted 15 minutes, eliminating cars that finished 11th to 16th. The final session lasted 12 minutes and determined pole position to tenth. Cars who progressed to the final session were not allowed to change tyres for the race's start, using the tyres with which they set their quickest lap times in the second session. It was the first dry qualifying session of the season, and the track temperature cooled gradually as it progressed. Rosberg set the fastest times in the second and third sessions to clinch his first pole position of the season and the fifth of his career with a time of 1:33.185. He was joined on the grid's front row by Hamilton, who locked his brakes going into the first turn on his final timed lap, flat-spotting his tyres and abandoning his attempt. Ricciardo qualified in third, but took a ten-place grid penalty for an unsafe pit stop release at the season's previous round in Malaysia. Hence, Bottas inherited the position and Pérez took fourth. Räikkönen felt uncomfortable with his Ferrari and medium compound tyre issues restricted him to fifth. Button—in his 250th Grand Prix— took sixth while an oversteer left Massa in seventh. Magnussen and Alonso were eighth and ninth respectively. Vettel was 10th due to a lack of track running following his final practice session spin, and a downshifting issue.

Hülkenberg was the fastest driver not advancing into the final session; he went wide at the turn 11 exit kerb which cost him time. Kvyat's fastest time was achieved in the track's first sector which qualified him 12th. After Ricciardo's penalty was applied, Kvyat was separated by teammate Jean-Éric Vergne who made an engine adjustment after feeling he was low on power. Gutiérrez took 15th ahead of the two Lotus cars of Romain Grosjean and Maldonado who both struggled for pace. Adrian Sutil failed to advance beyond the first session due to slower cars causing him to abort his final timed lap. However, he incurred a five-place grid penalty after he was deemed by the stewards to have forced Grosjean wide between turns 13 and 14 and two penalty points on his super licence and started from the back of the field. Kobayashi and Jules Bianchi started from 18th and 19th; Kobayashi did one timed lap on the soft compound tyres before entering the pit lane and rejoined the track with three minutes remaining for one further lap. Bianchi lost three-tenths of a second on the straights which he felt prevented him from qualifying ahead of Kobayashi. Marcus Ericsson used a new set of soft compound tyres but brake locking and an energy recovery system issue slowed him. He made a pit stop for a new set of soft compound tyres and qualified in 20th, ahead of teammate Max Chilton in 21st.

=== Qualifying classification ===
The fastest lap in each of the three sessions is denoted in bold.

Pos.	No.	Driver	Constructor	Q1	Q2	Q3	Grid
1	6	(Germany) Nico Rosberg	Mercedes	1:35.439	**1:33.708**	**1:33.185**	1
2	44	(United Kingdom) Lewis Hamilton	Mercedes	1:35.323	1:33.872	1:33.464	2
3	3	(Australia) Daniel Ricciardo	Red Bull Racing-Renault	1:36.220	1:34.592	1:34.051	13^{1}
4	77	(Finland) Valtteri Bottas	Williams-Mercedes	1:34.934	1:34.842	1:34.247	3
5	11	(Mexico) Sergio Pérez	Force India-Mercedes	1:34.998	1:34.747	1:34.346	4
6	7	(Finland) Kimi Räikkönen	Ferrari	1:35.234	1:34.925	1:34.368	5
7	22	(United Kingdom) Jenson Button	McLaren-Mercedes	1:35.699	1:34.714	1:34.387	6
8	19	(Brazil) Felipe Massa	Williams-Mercedes	1:35.085	1:34.842	1:34.511	7
9	20	(Denmark) Kevin Magnussen	McLaren-Mercedes	1:35.288	1:34.904	1:34.712	8
10	14	(Spain) Fernando Alonso	Ferrari	1:35.251	1:34.723	1:34.992	9
11	1	(Germany) Sebastian Vettel	Red Bull Racing-Renault	1:35.549	1:34.985	N/A	10
12	27	(Germany) Nico Hülkenberg	Force India-Mercedes	**1:34.874**	1:35.116	N/A	11
13	26	(Russia) Daniil Kvyat	Toro Rosso-Renault	1:35.395	1:35.145	N/A	12
14	25	(France) Jean-Éric Vergne	Toro Rosso-Renault	1:35.815	1:35.286	N/A	14
15	21	(Mexico) Esteban Gutiérrez	Sauber-Ferrari	1:36.567	1:35.891	N/A	15
16	8	(France) Romain Grosjean	Lotus-Renault	1:36.654	1:35.908	N/A	16
17	13	(Venezuela) Pastor Maldonado	Lotus-Renault	1:36.663	N/A	N/A	17
18	99	(Germany) Adrian Sutil	Sauber-Ferrari	1:36.840	N/A	N/A	22^{2}
19	10	(Japan) Kamui Kobayashi	Caterham-Renault	1:37.085	N/A	N/A	18
20	17	(France) Jules Bianchi	Marussia-Ferrari	1:37.310	N/A	N/A	19
21	9	(Sweden) Marcus Ericsson	Caterham-Renault	1:37.875	N/A	N/A	20
22	4	(United Kingdom) Max Chilton	Marussia-Ferrari	1:37.913	N/A	N/A	21
107% time: 1:41.515

Notes

- **^1** — Daniel Ricciardo was given a ten-place grid penalty for an unsafe pit release during the Malaysian Grand Prix.
- **^2** — Adrian Sutil was given a five-place grid penalty for impeding Romain Grosjean during qualifying.

== Race ==
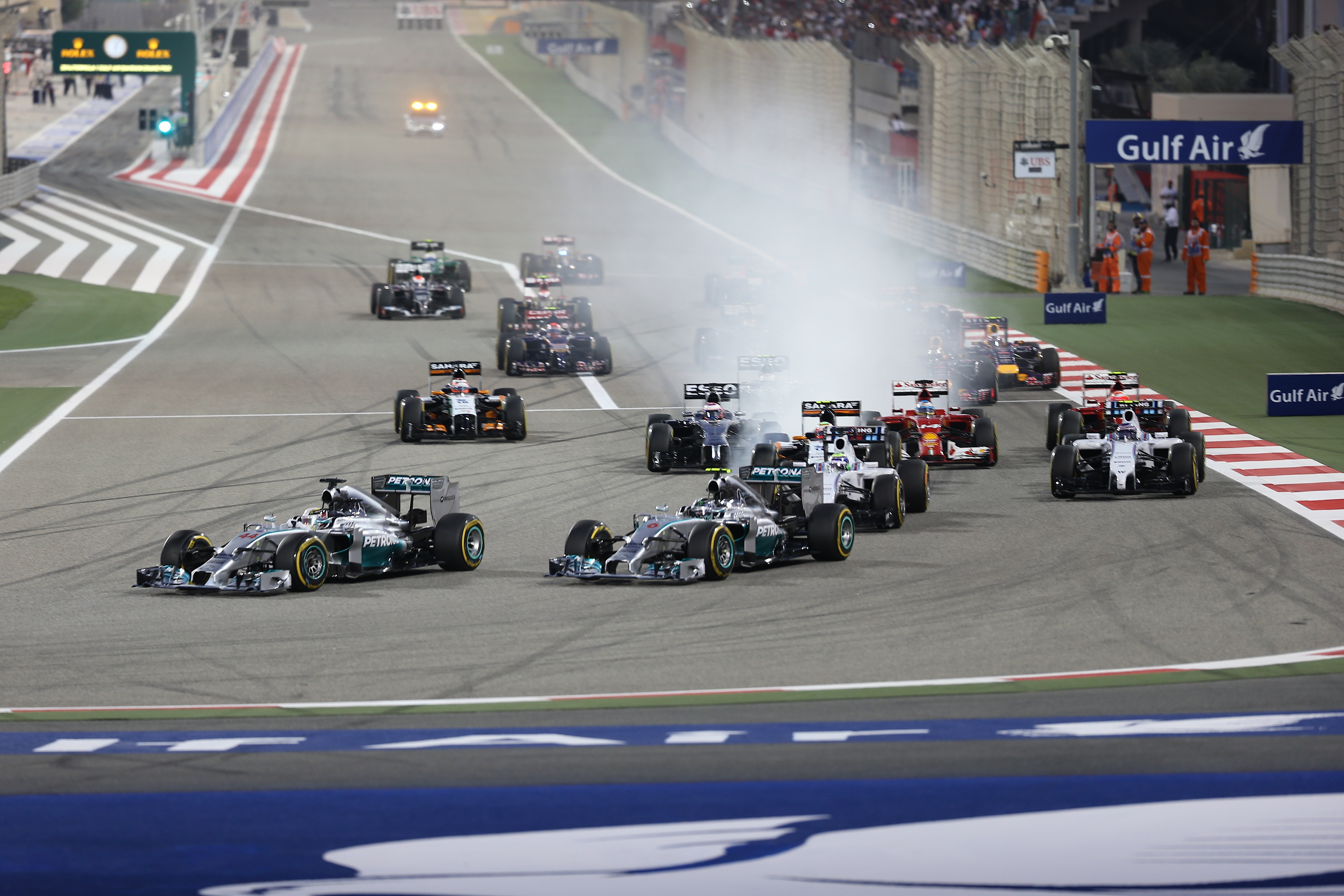
The start of the race where Lewis Hamilton passed teammate Nico Rosberg for the lead.

The race began before approximately 38,140 spectators at 18:00 Arabia Standard Time (UTC+03:00). The weather at the start was dry and hot with the air temperature between 23 and 26 °C (73 and 79 °F) and a track temperature ranging from 26 to 30 °C (79 to 86 °F). The cooler temperatures reduced the advantage of the medium compound tyres over the soft compound to less than the two seconds observed during daylight conditions.

When the race started, Hamilton accelerated faster than teammate Rosberg off the line, moving ahead of him by using the space between the pit wall heading into the first corner. Hamilton oversteered after leaving turn three and moved to the outside of the track. Rosberg attempted to retake the lead by going around the outside at the fourth turn, but Hamilton defended the position. Alonso overtook teammate Raikkönen around the inside at the first turn and then made contact with Magnussen. Alonso continued with minor bodywork damage. Vergne was squeezed by Maldonado at the turn eight entry and attempted to pass him. Maldonado drove defensively and both made contact. Vergne had a punctured right-rear tyre, along with rear wing and floor damage, and drove to the pit lane for repairs.

Massa made the best start of the field, moving from seventh to third by the end of the first lap, while Vergne lost eight positions over the same distance because of the Maldonado collision. At the end of the first lap, Hamilton led Rosberg by one second followed by: Massa, Pérez, Bottas, Button, Alonso, Hülkenberg, Räikkönen and Vettel. Having been unsuccessful in his attempts to retake the lead, Rosberg started to conserve fuel to prepare for an attack later in the race. Both he and Hamilton pulled away from the rest of the field. Hülkenberg passed Alonso by braking later than him at the first turn on lap four to move into seventh. The Williams cars were harder on their tyres than the surrounding cars, and third-placed Massa came under pressure from Pérez while Button closed the gap to Bottas. Ricciardo went to the outside of Magnussen on the ninth lap and overtook him for 11th driving into turn one. Ricciardo went off onto the corner's run-off area onto the exit kerbs, and defended his position from Kvyat who went to the inside of him going into turn four. Button battled Bottas around the inside heading towards the first turn on the following lap. The two drivers drove alongside each other through the following corner until Button moved in front of Bottas.

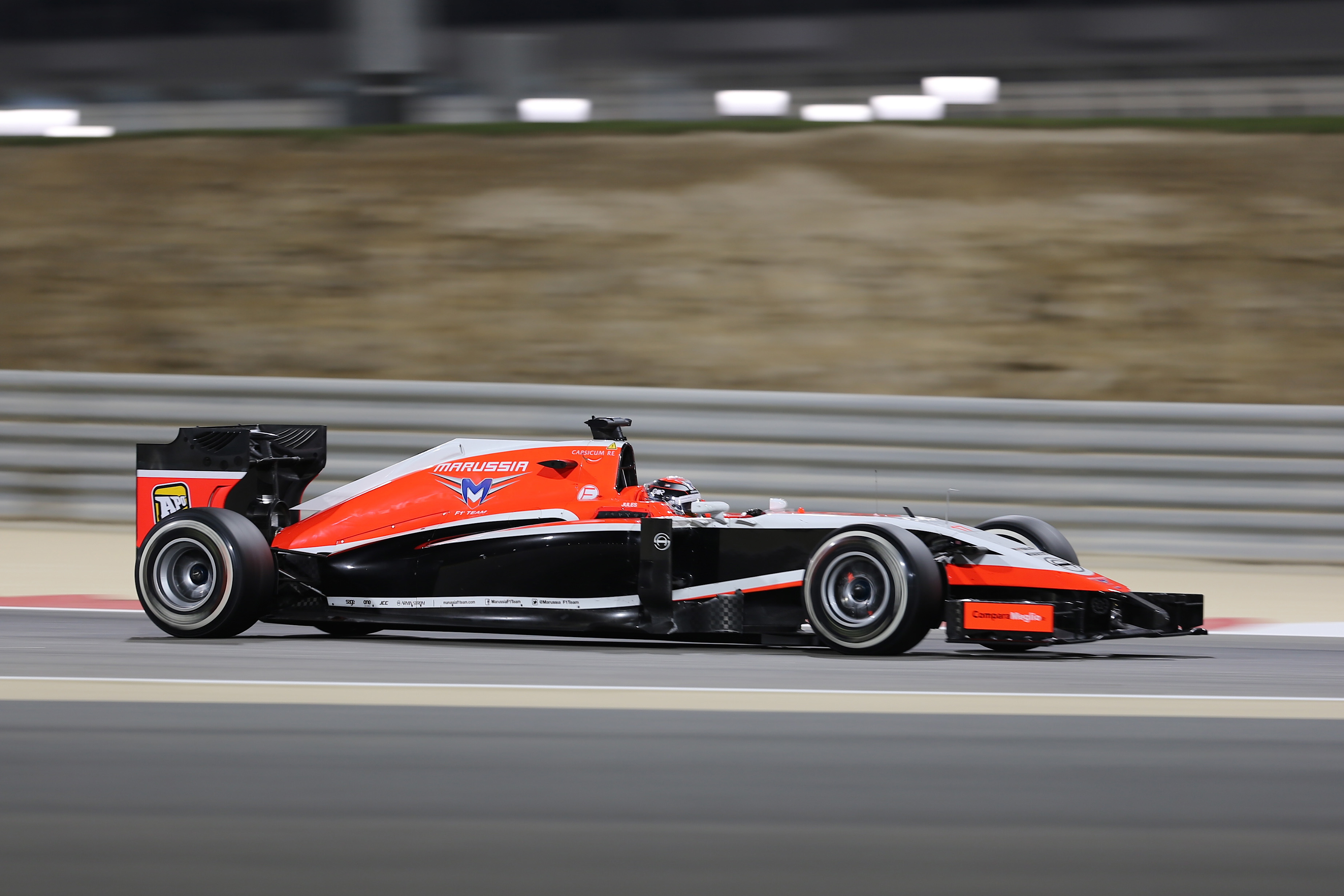
Jules Bianchi punctured his tyre in a collision with Adrian Sutil.

Ricciardo caught up to Magnussen while Hülkenberg overtook Bottas for seventh position shortly afterwards. Ricciardo moved to the outside of Magnussen on the backstraight and passed him after the McLaren slid while defending 11th place on lap eleven. Pérez attacked Massa going into the fourth turn and overtook him for third place on the next lap through turns five and six. Massa attempted to reclaim the position driving into the turn seven hairpin, but locked his tyres and temporarily bowed out of the battle. Both Williams cars – as well as both Ferrari drivers and Magnussen – had to change from a two-stop to a three-stop strategy as a result of high tyre wear. Magnussen's teammate Button, however, was able to conserve his tyres well enough to continue with doing just two stops. Sutil and Bianchi twice collided with each other at the first turn with the second collision causing Sutil to stop at the corner with a puncture, and debris was littered on the track. Bianchi's right-rear tyre was punctured and he entered the pit lane for a replacement wheel, but his car's floor was damaged, causing a loss in downforce which meant he had difficulty driving his car for the remainder of the race.

Vettel's DRS stopped working and he was quickly caught by teammate Ricciardo by the 15th lap. Ricciardo told his team by radio that the two cars were losing time and Red Bull ordered Vettel to cede sixth place to Ricciardo which he did immediately. Hülkenberg made a pit stop on the same lap and overtook Räikkonen and Kvyat on his out-lap shortly afterwards. Having saved more fuel, Rosberg had more horsepower available for an attack. After using DRS down the pit straight he managed to briefly get past Hamilton by out-braking on the inside into turn one. However, Rosberg's late braking forced him slightly wide, and Hamilton switched to the inside to immediately retake the position from Rosberg. On the following lap, Rosberg attempted the same move into the first turn again, and this time managed to stay ahead through the turn. However, Hamilton managed to come back at his teammate to claim the inside for turn two, with the two coming perilously close to contact as Hamilton cut across to retake first from Rosberg. This overtake was critical because as the lead Mercedes car, it meant that Hamilton was called into the pit lane first – diving into the pit lane at the end of the lap to be fitted with the soft compound tyre – while Rosberg would make a pit stop on lap 21 and take on the harder medium tyre.

Ricciardo and Button made pit stops on lap 20 while Bianchi was issued with a drive-through penalty because he was judged to have caused the incident between himself and Sutil. Button caught Räikkönen and used DRS to overtake him heading into the first corner. Sutil retired his Sauber after several slow laps on the track allowed him to gain more track experience. Vettel moved in front of Räikkönen by going around the inside without using the DRS system between the fourth and fifth turns, while Massa defended third position from teammate Bottas at the first turn. Three laps later, Massa came under pressure from Hülkenberg who attacked Massa by going around the inside heading towards the fourth turn and moved out of his slipstream, but Massa defended the place. Pérez took advantage to attack before entering turn five and moved in front of Hülkenberg. Ricciardo locked his tyres going into turn one and narrowly avoided impacting Räikkönen, but caught him on the backstraight. Bottas quickly caught the battle between Räikkönen and Ricciardo. He passed Ricciardo around the outside at turn one on the 30th lap and swerved left off onto a run-off area to avoid striking Räikkönen. Ricciardo retook the position.

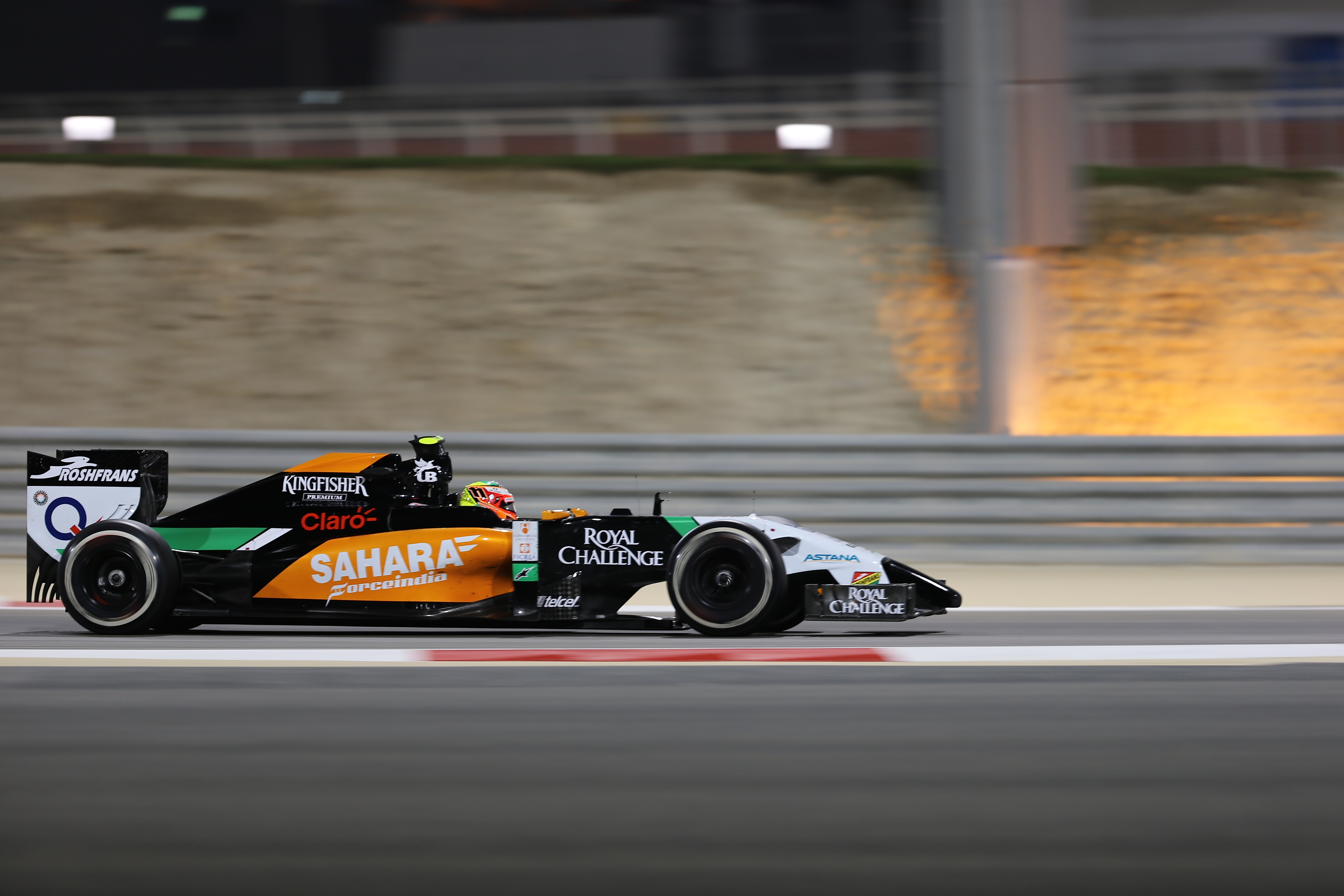
Sergio Pérez secured his first podium finish since the 2012 Italian Grand Prix.

Hamilton created a gap on the faster tyre over the next phase of the race and by lap 32 he was 8.5 seconds ahead of Rosberg. Ricciardo was able to pass Räikkönen and Bottas attempted to move in front of Räikkönen going into the downhill turn eight and passed him on the backstraight. Bottas closed up to Ricciardo while Massa passed Räikkönen on the backstraight for ninth. Pérez made a pit stop on lap 35 and rejoined behind Alonso before immediately passing Alonso. Ricciardo lost seventh position when Massa passed him. Ericsson pulled over to the side of the track to retire with an oil leak which followed a loss of engine power on the 37th lap. Ricciardo overtook Räikkönen around the outside on the following lap and moved in front of Magnussen shortly afterwards. Hamilton was around 10 seconds ahead of Rosberg with 17 laps remaining. However, with the soft compound tyre estimated to be as much as a second a lap faster than the medium compound, Rosberg still had a very good chance of catching up to his teammate in the remaining laps, as they were scheduled to be put on the opposite tyres for the final stint – Hamilton on medium tyres and Rosberg on the soft compound option.

After rejoining the track following a pit stop on lap 41, Maldonado was unable to react to Gutiérrez steering right into the first corner and hit his right-rear corner. Gutiérrez rolled over twice in the air before landing upright on the track. The ensuing debris resulted in the deployment of the safety car. Gutiérrez remained in his car for some time before climbing out to be transported to the local hospital for examination. Magnussen retired with clutch problems on the 42nd lap. Both Mercedes drivers made pit stops during the safety car period, but its deployment meant Hamilton's lead of over 10 seconds over Rosberg was reduced to nothing. With no gap between them, Hamilton would be at a big disadvantage on medium tyres that were estimated to be around a second a lap slower as the two Mercedes cars scrapped for the lead. As the safety car circulated, the team's technical director Paddy Lowe spoke to both Mercedes drivers on the radio to remind them that both cars needed to finish the race. With ten laps to go, the safety car drove into the pit lane and racing resumed. Hamilton defended from Rosberg heading into turn one, but Rosberg got the better line through the corner and through turns two and three, and he attempted to overtake again on the outside of turn four. Hamilton defended again, holding his teammate out wide and managed to maintain the lead.

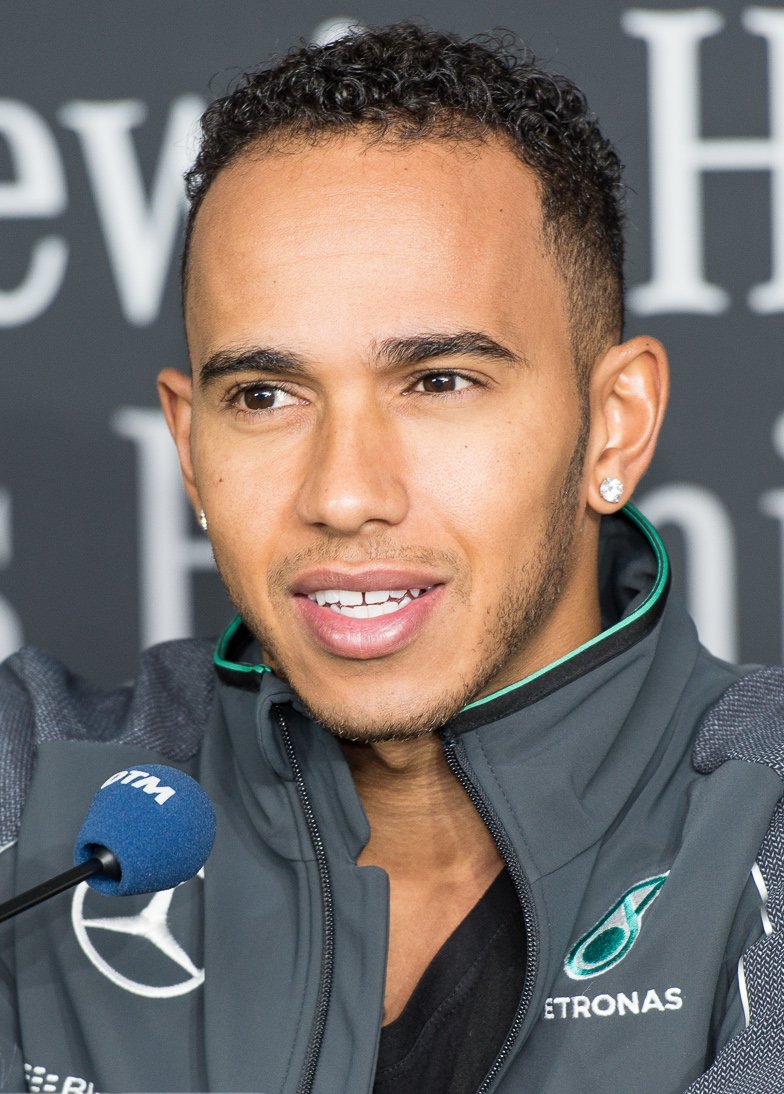
Lewis Hamilton held off a long race challenge from teammate Nico Rosberg to win the race.

Pérez fended off a challenge from teammate Hülkenberg for third. Button fell to seventh after being passed by Vettel on the backstraight and Ricciardo around the outside, while Maldonado was issued with a ten-second stop-and-go penalty for causing the incident between himself and Gutiérrez on lap 49 which he took immediately. With their drivers fighting hard for the lead, and with fuel no longer being a concern due to the safety car period, the Mercedes cars were being driven flat-out and the extent of their superiority was revealed for the first time; within three laps the two Mercedes had created a six-second gap over Pérez. Rosberg recorded the race's fastest lap on the 49th lap, completing a circuit of 1:37.020. Ricciardo passed teammate Vettel for fifth going on lap 50 into the first turn. Vettel attacked going up the hill heading towards turn four but Ricciardo defended the position. On lap 52, Rosberg again attempted a late braking move into turn one, but Hamilton managed to stay ahead by waiting for Rosberg to run wide from his late braking manoeuvre and turned in to switch to the inside and maintain his lead. Rosberg continued his assault by attempting the move again on the following lap, and again Hamilton drove defensively heading towards turn four and managed to hold on to the lead.

Hülkenberg made a mistake, allowing Ricciardo to take advantage and passed him at the turn eleven exit to move into fourth place on lap 53. Massa battled Vettel for sixth driving into the first corner and overtook him at the fourth turn, but Vettel retook the position. Button slowed with a clutch problem and drove into his garage to become the race's final retirement on the 56th lap. With the two Mercedes drivers having repeatedly duelled for position over the closing laps, Rosberg had taken the best from his tyres by the start of the final lap. Hamilton maintained his advantage over the rest of the lap to win the race. Rosberg finished second, and Pérez narrowly held off a closing Ricciardo over the final few laps to clinch third. It was Pérez's first podium since the 2012 Italian Grand Prix and Force India's first since the 2009 Belgian Grand Prix. Hülkenberg finished fifth, ahead of Vettel and Massa in sixth and seventh. Bottas, Alonso and Räikkönen rounded out the top ten points-scoring finishers. Kvyat, Grosjean, Chilton, Maldonado and Kobayashi filled the next five positions, while Bianchi (one lap down) was the last of the classified finishers. There were two lead changes in the race; two drivers reached the front of the field. Hamilton's total of 54 laps led was the most of any competitor. It was Hamilton's second consecutive victory of the season and the 24th of his career, equalling the number of victories by five-time World Champion Juan Manuel Fangio.

=== Post-race ===
In parc fermé following the race, both Hamilton and Rosberg had a mock fight. At the podium interviews, conducted by AC/DC lead singer Brian Johnson, Hamilton said he was "really, really proud" to have secured his first victory at the track and was grateful for his team for working hard to achieve the result. He praised Rosberg for his race performance and described the battle between the two drivers as "very fair". Rosberg stated that he strongly disliked finishing behind Hamilton, and it was something he did not particularly enjoy, but felt the event was "the most exciting race I've ever done in my whole career". Pérez said his third-place result was "very special" to him as it was his third race with the Force India team. He said it had been easier for him until the deployment of the safety car, and claimed that he would not have been able to fend off Ricciardo for another lap. In the later press conference, Hamilton said it was difficult to defend against Rosberg with the medium compound tyres, and that he had not driven as hard against him since they competed against each other early in their careers. Rosberg stated he was pushing hard and revealed his strategy was planned by Mercedes and would undertake a similar move in the future. Pérez felt his podium position was important to him having never achieved the feat while driving for McLaren in 2013; finishing the race in third gave him "a great feeling".

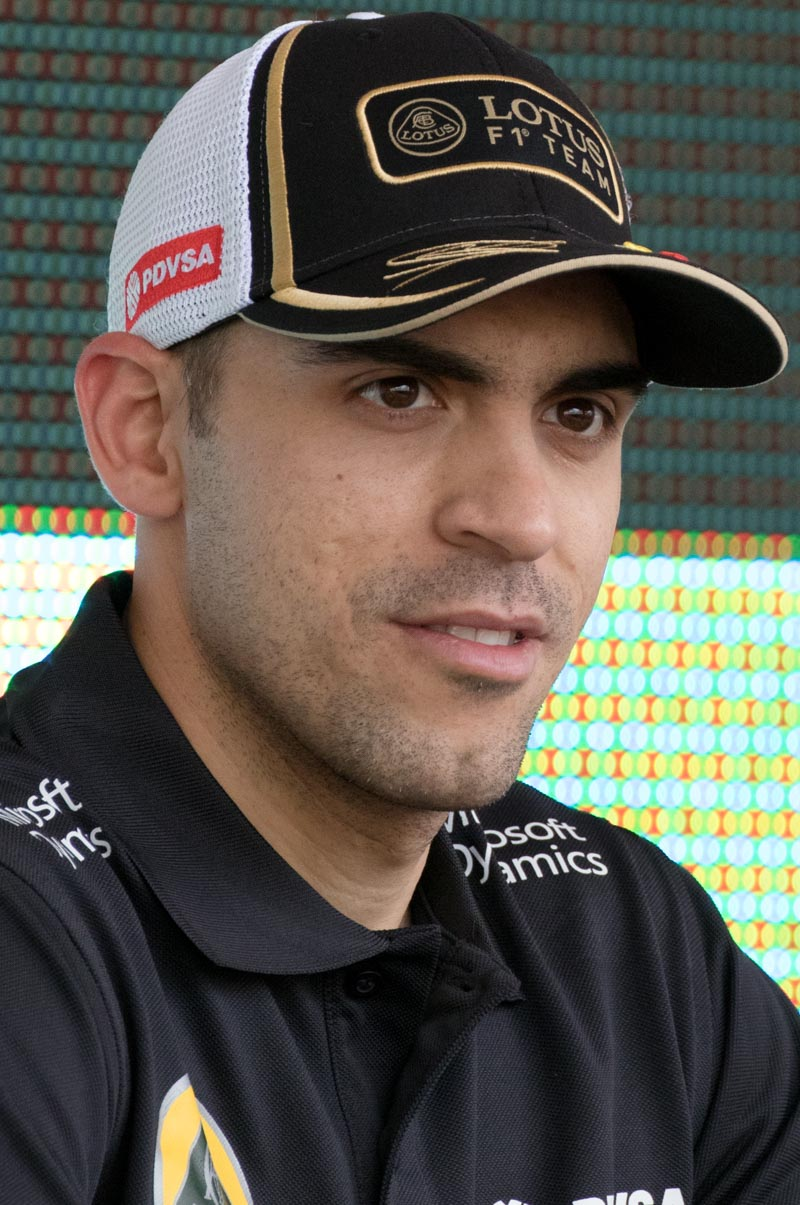
Pastor Maldonado (pictured in 2015) was penalised five grid places for the Chinese Grand Prix following contact with Esteban Gutiérrez.

Gutiérrez said he was surprised at the force of Maldonado's impact which forced his retirement, arguing that he was in front of the driver and could do to nothing to prevent the crash from occurring. Maldonado claimed he was unable to avoid contact with Gutiérrez, but stated he would watch the incident again as he believed Gutiérrez missed his braking point and was off the racing line going into the first turn. Maldonado incurred a five-place grid penalty for the next round of the season in China, and three penalty points on his super licence. The two drivers spoke to each other about the crash and Maldonado told him that he did not expect to steer into Gutiérrez, but maintained that he did not cause the incident. Sutil felt Bianchi was driving aggressively having forced him wide at the race's start and was unable to prevent the crash from occurring. Bianchi said he was "really disappointed" describing it as "another tough race for me; the third one in a row". He argued that he was in front of Sutil driving into the first corner, but had enjoyed battling with the driver earlier in the race.

Media reactions to the race were positive, with David Tremayne of The Independent writing, "Thank the Lord that so many of Formula 1's detractors were present in Bahrain, where the 900th grand prix since the world championship was inaugurated turned out to be a humdinger that was easily the best held so far under the new regulations." With the amount of battling across the field, it was not "taxi driving" as Ferrari President Luca di Montezemolo earlier claimed would be the outcome of Formula One's adoption of greener technology. Writing for The Sunday Telegraph, Daniel Johnson stated the day's racing was "some of the finest seen in years", and the discussion over how Formula One's "new rules had stifled competition, leaving little more than a series of fuel economy run" was premature. Kevin Eason of The Times wrote, "It took team-mates of raw courage and epic skill to drag Formula One from the round of squalid infighting that polluted the cool night air of Bahrain yesterday." The Guardian's motor racing correspondent Paul Weaver spoke of "an absolute thriller from lights to flag with more overtaking moves than you could shake your DRS at", and, "the fireworks that exploded into the night sky were a worthy celebration of the best race for years".

The race ensured Rosberg remained the leader of the World Drivers' Championship but his advantage over Hamilton had been reduced from 18 to 11 championship points. Hülkenberg's fifth-place finish promoted him from sixth to third on 28 championship points, while Alonso and Button's results fell one position from third and fourth places respectively. Mercedes increased their advantage at the top of the World Constructors' Championship to 67 championship points. Force India's strong result elevated them from fifth to second, one championship point ahead of McLaren in third place. Red Bull were in fourth on 35 championship points after moving from sixth, with Ferrari dropping two positions to be a further two behind in fifth with 16 races left in the season.

=== Race classification ===
Drivers who scored championship points are denoted in bold.

Pos.	No.	Driver	Constructor	Laps	Time/Retired	Grid	Points
1	44	(United Kingdom) **Lewis Hamilton**	**Mercedes**	57	1:39:42.743	2	25
2	6	(Germany) **Nico Rosberg**	**Mercedes**	57	+1.085	1	18
3	11	(Mexico) **Sergio Pérez**	**Force India-Mercedes**	57	+24.067	4	15
4	3	(Australia) **Daniel Ricciardo**	**Red Bull Racing-Renault**	57	+24.489	13	12
5	27	(Germany) **Nico Hülkenberg**	**Force India-Mercedes**	57	+28.654	11	10
6	1	(Germany) **Sebastian Vettel**	**Red Bull Racing-Renault**	57	+29.879	10	8
7	19	(Brazil) **Felipe Massa**	**Williams-Mercedes**	57	+31.265	7	6
8	77	(Finland) **Valtteri Bottas**	**Williams-Mercedes**	57	+31.876	3	4
9	14	(Spain) **Fernando Alonso**	**Ferrari**	57	+32.595	9	2
10	7	(Finland) **Kimi Räikkönen**	**Ferrari**	57	+33.462	5	1
11	26	(Russia) Daniil Kvyat	Toro Rosso-Renault	57	+41.342	12	
12	8	(France) Romain Grosjean	Lotus-Renault	57	+43.143	16	
13	4	(United Kingdom) Max Chilton	Marussia-Ferrari	57	+59.909	21	
14	13	(Venezuela) Pastor Maldonado	Lotus-Renault	57	+1:02.803	17	
15	10	(Japan) Kamui Kobayashi	Caterham-Renault	57	+1:27.900	18	
16	17	(France) Jules Bianchi	Marussia-Ferrari	56	+1 Lap	19	
17	22	(United Kingdom) Jenson Button	McLaren-Mercedes	55	Clutch	6	
Ret	20	(Denmark) Kevin Magnussen	McLaren-Mercedes	40	Clutch	8	
Ret	21	(Mexico) Esteban Gutiérrez	Sauber-Ferrari	39	Collision	15	
Ret	9	(Sweden) Marcus Ericsson	Caterham-Renault	33	Oil leak	20	
Ret	25	(France) Jean-Éric Vergne	Toro Rosso-Renault	18	Collision damage	14	
Ret	99	(Germany) Adrian Sutil	Sauber-Ferrari	17	Collision damage	22	

== Championship standings after the race ==
Drivers' Championship standings

+/–	Pos.	Driver	Points
	1	(Germany) Nico Rosberg	61
	2	(United Kingdom) Lewis Hamilton	50
3	3	(Germany) Nico Hülkenberg	28
1	4	(Spain) Fernando Alonso	26
1	5	(United Kingdom) Jenson Button	23

Constructors' Championship standings

+/–	Pos.	Constructor	Points
	1	(Germany) Mercedes	111
3	2	Force India-Mercedes	44
1	3	(United Kingdom) McLaren-Mercedes	43
2	4	(Austria) Red Bull Racing-Renault	35
2	5	(Italy) Ferrari	33
Sources:

- Note: Only the top five positions are included for both sets of standings.

== See also ==
- 2014 Bahrain GP2 Series round

== Footnotes ==
Previous race: 2014 Malaysian Grand Prix	FIA Formula One World Championship; 2014 season	Next race: 2014 Chinese Grand Prix
Previous race: 2013 Bahrain Grand Prix	Bahrain Grand Prix	Next race: 2015 Bahrain Grand Prix
