= 2014 Malaysian Grand Prix =

Formula One motor race held in 2014

Race 2 of 19 in the 2014 Formula One World Championship
| ← Previous race | Next race → |

Race details
- Date: 30 March 2014
- Official name: 2014 Formula 1 Petronas Malaysia Grand Prix
- Location: Sepang International Circuit; Sepang, Selangor, Malaysia
- Course: Permanent racing facility
- Course length: 5.543 km (3.444 miles)
- Distance: 56 laps, 310.408 km (192.879 miles)
- Weather: Dry, 32°C
- Attendance: 92,550 (Weekend)

Pole position
| Driver | (United Kingdom) Lewis Hamilton | Mercedes |
- Time: 1:59.431

Fastest lap
| Driver | (United Kingdom) Lewis Hamilton | Mercedes |
- Time: 1:43.066 on lap 53

Podium
| First | (United Kingdom) Lewis Hamilton | Mercedes |
| Second | (Germany) Nico Rosberg | Mercedes |
| Third | (Germany) Sebastian Vettel | Red Bull Racing-Renault |

The 2014 Malaysian Grand Prix, formally known as the 2014 Formula 1 Petronas Malaysia Grand Prix, was a Formula One motor race that was held on 30 March 2014 at the Sepang International Circuit in Selangor, Malaysia.

The 56-lap-race was won by Mercedes driver Lewis Hamilton who started from pole position. Hamilton also took the fastest lap of the race and led every single lap, meaning that he achieved his first Grand Chelem, finishing ahead of teammate Nico Rosberg who won the season opener in Australia two weeks ago. It was Mercedes' first 1–2 finish since the 1955 Italian Grand Prix. Defending four-time world champion Sebastian Vettel, driving for Red Bull, completed the podium by finishing third.

Following the result, Hamilton made a huge step forward in the Drivers' standings after his retirement in Australia, climbing up seventeen places in order to advance to second in the championship behind teammate Rosberg, who extended his lead to 18 points. Fernando Alonso, who took his second consecutive fourth-place-finish, improved from fourth to third with 24 points, one behind Hamilton, but he managed to overtook the McLaren pair of Jenson Button and Kevin Magnussen, who fell to fourth and fifth, respectively. It also meant that the result elevated Mercedes to the lead of the Constructors' Championship with 68 points, 25 clear from the previous leaders McLaren, with Ferrari a further 13 points adrift in third.

== Report ==
=== Background ===
Like the 2013 Malaysian Grand Prix, tyre supplier Pirelli brought its orange-banded hard compound tyre as the harder "prime" tyre and the white-banded medium compound tyre as the softer "option" tyre.

Prior to the race, there was a minute's silence as a mark of respect to the passengers of Malaysia Airlines Flight 370, which disappeared over the Indian Ocean three weeks prior. Drivers also carried messages on their cars and helmets.

=== Qualifying ===
Lewis Hamilton put his Mercedes on pole position, the 33rd of his career. He thus equalled Jim Clark for most poles of a British Formula One driver. Behind him was Red Bull Racing's Sebastian Vettel and Hamilton's teammate Nico Rosberg.

=== Race ===
Lewis Hamilton dominated the race, flying away at the start. Nico Hülkenberg also had a good start from seventh place, briefly battling with Kimi Räikkönen before getting stuck up behind Fernando Alonso. Sergio Pérez did not start the race due to a gearbox issue.

There was a first lap incident when Pastor Maldonado and Jules Bianchi collided with one another, effectively ending the race for both of the drivers when they received mechanical complications. Bianchi would later receive a penalty for his actions despite Marussia officials' claims that the incident was due to a collision with Toro Rosso's Jean-Éric Vergne hitting the back of the Marussia. At the end of the first lap, the top four – Hamilton, Nico Rosberg, Sebastian Vettel and Daniel Ricciardo – had effectively escaped the rest of the pack and the grid was unchanged until the last ten laps of the race.

Hülkenberg fought a lengthy battle with Alonso for fourth place, ultimately losing it due to Alonso's fresh tyres, as Force India were the only team in the top five to have successfully executed a two-stop pit strategy, while the others stuck to three stops. Felipe Massa, Valtteri Bottas and Jenson Button battled for sixth place, during which Massa received the radio message, "Felipe, Valtteri is faster than you", similar to the one he received during the 2010 German Grand Prix in reference to Fernando Alonso, his teammate at Ferrari.

Both the Saubers of Adrian Sutil and Esteban Gutiérrez had retired after Sutil experienced an electrical failure and Gutiérrez experienced a gearbox failure, preventing him from getting out of neutral gear. Ricciardo was having a good race until his third pit-stop, when he was released before his left-front tyre was correctly fastened. He then had to be pushed back into the pits. He then experienced the failure of his front wing, leading him to make the decision to retire.

Räikkönen had a terrible race from the start after Kevin Magnussen's McLaren clipped his right rear tyre going into the first corner on lap 2, causing a puncture. He ultimately finished twelfth, 0.1 seconds behind the Lotus of Romain Grosjean. Hamilton led every lap of the race and set the fastest lap and thus took the first Grand Chelem of his career, giving Mercedes their first 1-2 finish since the 1955 Italian Grand Prix, after Rosberg finished second and Vettel third. Alonso came in fourth after a last-lap battle with Hülkenberg who finished fifth, almost forty seconds ahead of McLaren's Jenson Button, who was able to hold off both of Williams' drivers, Massa and Bottas, who finished seventh and eighth respectively giving Williams a one-point lead over Force India. Magnussen finished ninth for McLaren and the top ten was completed by Daniil Kvyat of Toro Rosso. Kamui Kobayashi and Marcus Ericsson finished thirteenth and fourteenth for Caterham, effectively putting them ahead of Marussia in the Constructors' Championship standings.

=== Post-race ===
Daniel Ricciardo was given a 10-place grid penalty for the Bahrain Grand Prix after the Red Bull Racing team released his car in an unsafe manner from his pit box. Kevin Magnussen and Jules Bianchi both received two penalty points each, along with Valtteri Bottas after Bottas was accused of impeding Ricciardo during qualifying.

== Classification ==
=== Qualifying ===
| Pos. | No. | Driver | Constructor | Q1 | Q2 | Q3 | Grid |
|---|---|---|---|---|---|---|---|
| 1 | 44 | (United Kingdom) Lewis Hamilton | Mercedes | 1:57.202 | 1:59.041 | 1:59.431 | 1 |
| 2 | 1 | (Germany) Sebastian Vettel | Red Bull Racing-Renault | 1:57.654 | 1:59.399 | 1:59.486 | 2 |
| 3 | 6 | (Germany) Nico Rosberg | Mercedes | 1:57.183 | 1:59.445 | 2:00.050 | 3 |
| 4 | 14 | (Spain) Fernando Alonso | Ferrari | 1:58.889 | 2:01.356 | 2:00.175 | 4 |
| 5 | 3 | (Australia) Daniel Ricciardo | Red Bull Racing-Renault | 1:58.913 | 2:00.147 | 2:00.541 | 5 |
| 6 | 7 | (Finland) Kimi Räikkönen | Ferrari | 1:59.257 | 2:01.532 | 2:01.218 | 6 |
| 7 | 27 | (Germany) Nico Hülkenberg | Force India-Mercedes | 1:58.883 | 2:00.839 | 2:01.712 | 7 |
| 8 | 20 | (Denmark) Kevin Magnussen | McLaren-Mercedes | 2:00.358 | 2:02.094 | 2:02.213 | 8 |
| 9 | 25 | (France) Jean-Éric Vergne | Toro Rosso-Renault | 2:01.689 | 2:02.096 | 2:03.078 | 9 |
| 10 | 22 | (United Kingdom) Jenson Button | McLaren-Mercedes | 2:00.889 | 2:01.810 | 2:04.053 | 10 |
| 11 | 26 | (Russia) Daniil Kvyat | Toro Rosso-Renault | 2:01.175 | 2:02.351 | | 11 |
| 12 | 21 | (Mexico) Esteban Gutiérrez | Sauber-Ferrari | 2:01.134 | 2:02.369 | | 12 |
| 13 | 19 | (Brazil) Felipe Massa | Williams-Mercedes | 2:00.047 | 2:02.460 | | 13 |
| 14 | 11 | (Mexico) Sergio Pérez | Force India-Mercedes | 2:00.076 | 2:02.511 | | 14 |
| 15 | 77 | (Finland) Valtteri Bottas | Williams-Mercedes | 1:59.709 | 2:02.756 | | 18^{1} |
| 16 | 8 | (France) Romain Grosjean | Lotus-Renault | 2:00.202 | 2:02.885 | | 15 |
| 17 | 13 | (Venezuela) Pastor Maldonado | Lotus-Renault | 2:02.074 | | | 16 |
| 18 | 99 | (Germany) Adrian Sutil | Sauber-Ferrari | 2:02.131 | | | 17 |
| 19 | 17 | (France) Jules Bianchi | Marussia-Ferrari | 2:02.702 | | | 19 |
| 20 | 10 | (Japan) Kamui Kobayashi | Caterham-Renault | 2:03.595 | | | 20 |
| 21 | 4 | (United Kingdom) Max Chilton | Marussia-Ferrari | 2:04.388 | | | 21 |
| 22 | 9 | (Sweden) Marcus Ericsson | Caterham-Renault | 2:04.407 | | | 22 |
107% time: 2:05.385

Notes

- ^1 — Valtteri Bottas was given a three-place grid penalty for impeding Daniel Ricciardo during qualifying.

=== Race ===
| Pos. | No. | Driver | Constructor | Laps | Time/Retired | Grid | Points |
|---|---|---|---|---|---|---|---|
| 1 | 44 | (United Kingdom) Lewis Hamilton | Mercedes | 56 | 1:40:25.974 | 1 | 25 |
| 2 | 6 | (Germany) Nico Rosberg | Mercedes | 56 | +17.313 | 3 | 18 |
| 3 | 1 | (Germany) Sebastian Vettel | Red Bull Racing-Renault | 56 | +24.534 | 2 | 15 |
| 4 | 14 | (Spain) Fernando Alonso | Ferrari | 56 | +35.992 | 4 | 12 |
| 5 | 27 | (Germany) Nico Hülkenberg | Force India-Mercedes | 56 | +47.199 | 7 | 10 |
| 6 | 22 | (United Kingdom) Jenson Button | McLaren-Mercedes | 56 | +1:23.691 | 10 | 8 |
| 7 | 19 | (Brazil) Felipe Massa | Williams-Mercedes | 56 | +1:25.076 | 13 | 6 |
| 8 | 77 | (Finland) Valtteri Bottas | Williams-Mercedes | 56 | +1:25.537 | 18 | 4 |
| 9 | 20 | (Denmark) Kevin Magnussen | McLaren-Mercedes | 55 | +1 Lap | 8 | 2 |
| 10 | 26 | (Russia) Daniil Kvyat | Toro Rosso-Renault | 55 | +1 Lap | 11 | 1 |
| 11 | 8 | (France) Romain Grosjean | Lotus-Renault | 55 | +1 Lap | 15 | |
| 12 | 7 | (Finland) Kimi Räikkönen | Ferrari | 55 | +1 Lap | 6 | |
| 13 | 10 | (Japan) Kamui Kobayashi | Caterham-Renault | 55 | +1 Lap | 20 | |
| 14 | 9 | (Sweden) Marcus Ericsson | Caterham-Renault | 54 | +2 Laps | 22 | |
| 15 | 4 | (United Kingdom) Max Chilton | Marussia-Ferrari | 54 | +2 Laps | 21 | |
| Ret | 3 | (Australia) Daniel Ricciardo | Red Bull Racing-Renault | 49 | Wing | 5 | |
| Ret | 21 | (Mexico) Esteban Gutiérrez | Sauber-Ferrari | 35 | Gearbox | 12 | |
| Ret | 99 | (Germany) Adrian Sutil | Sauber-Ferrari | 32 | Power unit | 17 | |
| Ret | 25 | (France) Jean-Éric Vergne | Toro Rosso-Renault | 18 | Turbo | 9 | |
| Ret | 17 | (France) Jules Bianchi | Marussia-Ferrari | 8 | Brakes | 19 | |
| Ret | 13 | (Venezuela) Pastor Maldonado | Lotus-Renault | 7 | Power unit | 16 | |
| DNS | 11 | (Mexico) Sergio Pérez | Force India-Mercedes | 0 | Gearbox | 14 | |

== Championship standings after the race ==
Drivers' Championship standings

| | Pos. | Driver | Points |
|---|---|---|---|
| | 1 | (Germany) Nico Rosberg | 43 |
| 17 | 2 | (United Kingdom) Lewis Hamilton | 25 |
| 1 | 3 | (Spain) Fernando Alonso | 24 |
| 1 | 4 | (United Kingdom) Jenson Button | 23 |
| 3 | 5 | (Denmark) Kevin Magnussen | 20 |

Constructors' Championship standings

| | Pos. | Constructor | Points |
|---|---|---|---|
| 1 | 1 | (Germany) Mercedes | 68 |
| 1 | 2 | (United Kingdom) McLaren-Mercedes | 43 |
| | 3 | (Italy) Ferrari | 30 |
| | 4 | (United Kingdom) Williams-Mercedes | 20 |
| | 5 | Force India-Mercedes | 19 |

- Note: Only the top five positions are included for both sets of standings.

| Previous race: 2014 Australian Grand Prix | FIA Formula One World Championship; 2014 season | Next race: 2014 Bahrain Grand Prix |
| Previous race: 2013 Malaysian Grand Prix | Malaysian Grand Prix | Next race: 2015 Malaysian Grand Prix |
