= Marussia MR02 =

Formula One motor racing car

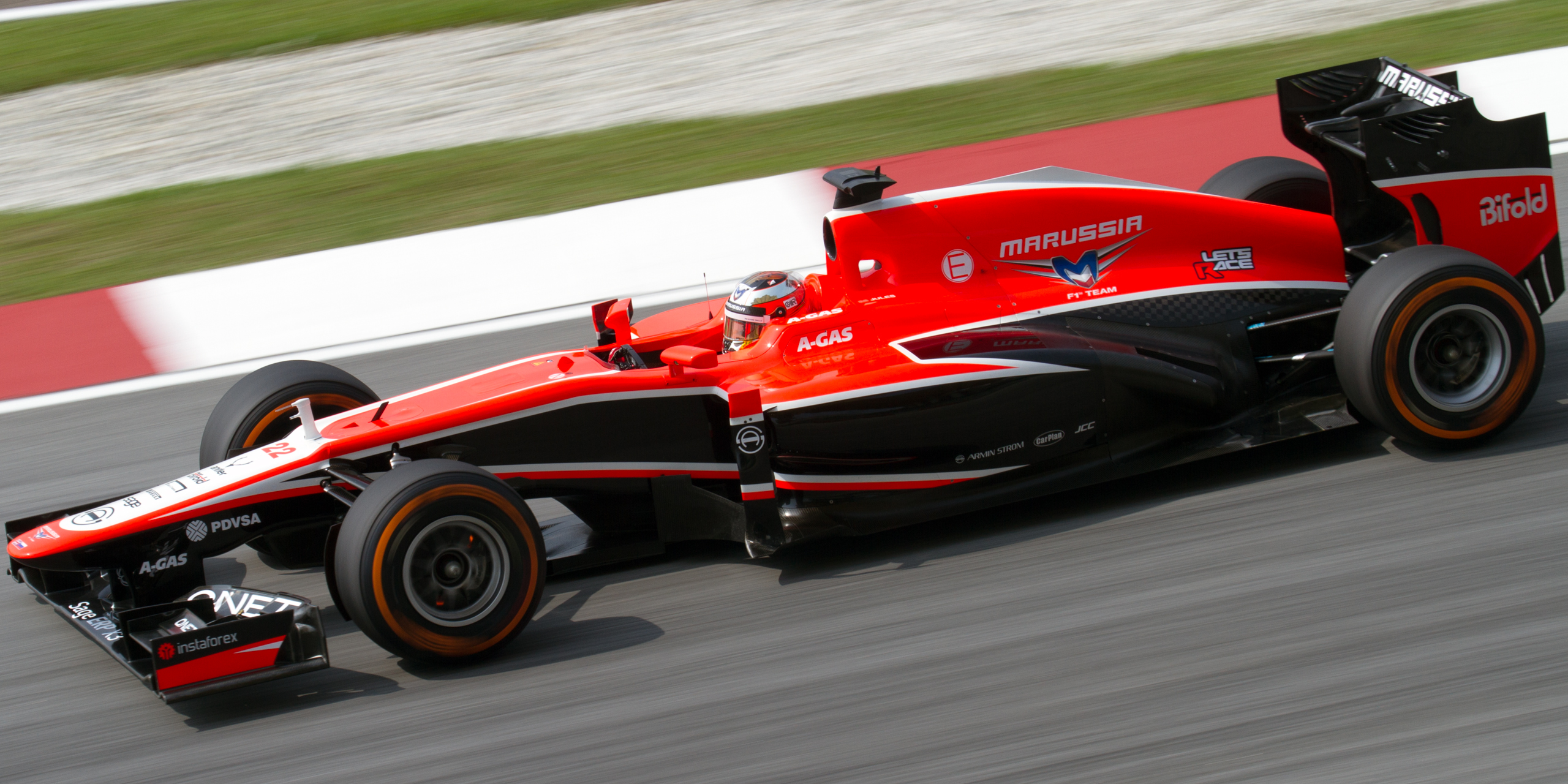
- Jules Bianchi driving the MR02 at the Malaysian Grand Prix
- Category: Formula One
- Constructor: Marussia
- Designers: Pat Symonds (Technical Director); Nikolay Fomenko (Engineering Director); John McQuilliam (Chief Designer); Rob Taylor (Deputy Chief Designer); Richard Taylor (Head of Aerodynamics)
- Predecessor: Marussia MR01
- Successor: Marussia MR03

Technical specifications
- Chassis: Moulded carbon fibre composite monocoque incorporating front and side impact structures
- Suspension (front): Carbon fibre pushrod double wishbone suspension, with Penske dampers
- Suspension (rear): Carbon fibre pullrod double wishbone suspension, with Penske dampers
- Length: 4,995 mm (197 in)
- Width: 1,800 mm (71 in)
- Height: 950 mm (37 in)
- Wheelbase: 3,400 mm (134 in)
- Engine: Cosworth CA2013K 2.4 L (146 cu in) V8 (90°). naturally aspirated, 18,000 RPM limited with Williams Advanced Engineering KERS, mid-mounted.
- Transmission: Xtrac 1044 sequential semi-automatic 7-speed sport gearbox electronically-controlled paddle shift including reverse
- Weight: at least 642 kg (1,415 lb) (including driver)
- Fuel: BP Ultimate 94.25% 102 RON unleaded gasoline + 5.75% biofuel
- Lubricants: Castrol EDGE
- Tyres: Pirelli P Zero (dry), Cinturato (wet); BBS Wheels (front and rear): 13"

Competition history
- Notable entrants: Marussia F1 Team
- Notable drivers: 22. (France) Jules Bianchi; 23. (United Kingdom) Max Chilton
- Debut: 2013 Australian Grand Prix
- Last event: 2013 Brazilian Grand Prix
Races	Wins	Podiums	Poles	F/Laps
19	0	0	0	0

The Marussia MR02 is a Formula One racing car designed under the leadership of Marussia's Technical Director Pat Symonds. It made its competitive debut in the 2013 Formula One season.

As of the 2026 Formula One season, the Marussia MR02 is the last F1 car to be powered by an engine designed by Cosworth.

== Overview ==
Where it was driven by debutant drivers Max Chilton and Jules Bianchi, who replaced Luiz Razia, the team's original choice for the seat. The car was launched at the Circuito de Jerez on 5 February, making the MR02 the first car that Marussia (and its predecessor Virgin Racing) has completed in time to start winter testing.

Initially, Chilton was set to be paired with Timo Glock, but the German driver subsequently signed with BMW to compete in the DTM. According to Marussia team principal John Booth, difficult financial circumstances forced the split with Glock; the driver himself noted that losing tenth place in the 2012 Constructors' Championship to Caterham was the first sign that his future with the team was in jeopardy. The other seat alongside Chilton was initially intended for Brazilian driver Luiz Razia but budgetary issues led the team to opt for Bianchi instead. The Russian-owned outfit also named Venezuelan driver Rodolfo González as its third driver.

== Design ==
=== Technical staff changes ===
After being suspended from the sport for his role in the race-fixing controversy of 2009, Pat Symonds took on the role of consultant to the Marussia team (then known as Virgin Racing) in 2011. His suspension was lifted at the end of the 2012 season, allowing Symonds to actively participate in the development of the MR02. Under his direction, Marussia abandoned the exclusive use of computational fluid dynamics (CFD)—a method developed by former chief designer Nick Wirth—to develop their car, and instead used conventional techniques such as scale models and wind tunnels, with CFD used to complement rather than dominate the design process. In addition, Marussia formed a technical partnership with McLaren Applied Technologies, the technical development arm of Formula One team McLaren and its parent company, to use their wind tunnel facilities.

=== Energy recovery systems ===
The MR02 was the first car built by Marussia to use the Kinetic energy recovery system (KERS) device since the system was reintroduced in 2011. The car used a KERS device designed by Williams F1, based on the design that Williams used when they were a customer of Marussia's engine supplier, Cosworth, in 2011.

=== Exhaust configuration ===
The car was launched with a partial Coandă effect exhaust system, the concept of which had been developed by other teams throughout the 2012 season. The Coandă system uses the curved bodywork of the car to direct the flow of exhaust gases over the rear diffuser, generating increased downforce.

== Competition history ==
The MR02 made its competitive debut at the 2013 Australian Grand Prix. In difficult conditions, Jules Bianchi and Max Chilton qualified in nineteenth and twentieth place, ahead of their closest rivals, the Caterhams drivers Charles Pic and Giedo van der Garde. Bianchi went on to finish the race in fifteenth place, one lap behind eventual winner Kimi Räikkönen. Chilton finished in seventeenth place, two laps behind Räikkönen. At the next race in Malaysia, Bianchi took advantage of a string of retirements to finish thirteenth overall, once again ahead of the Caterham drivers. Chilton went on to finish sixteenth, as the final classified driver.

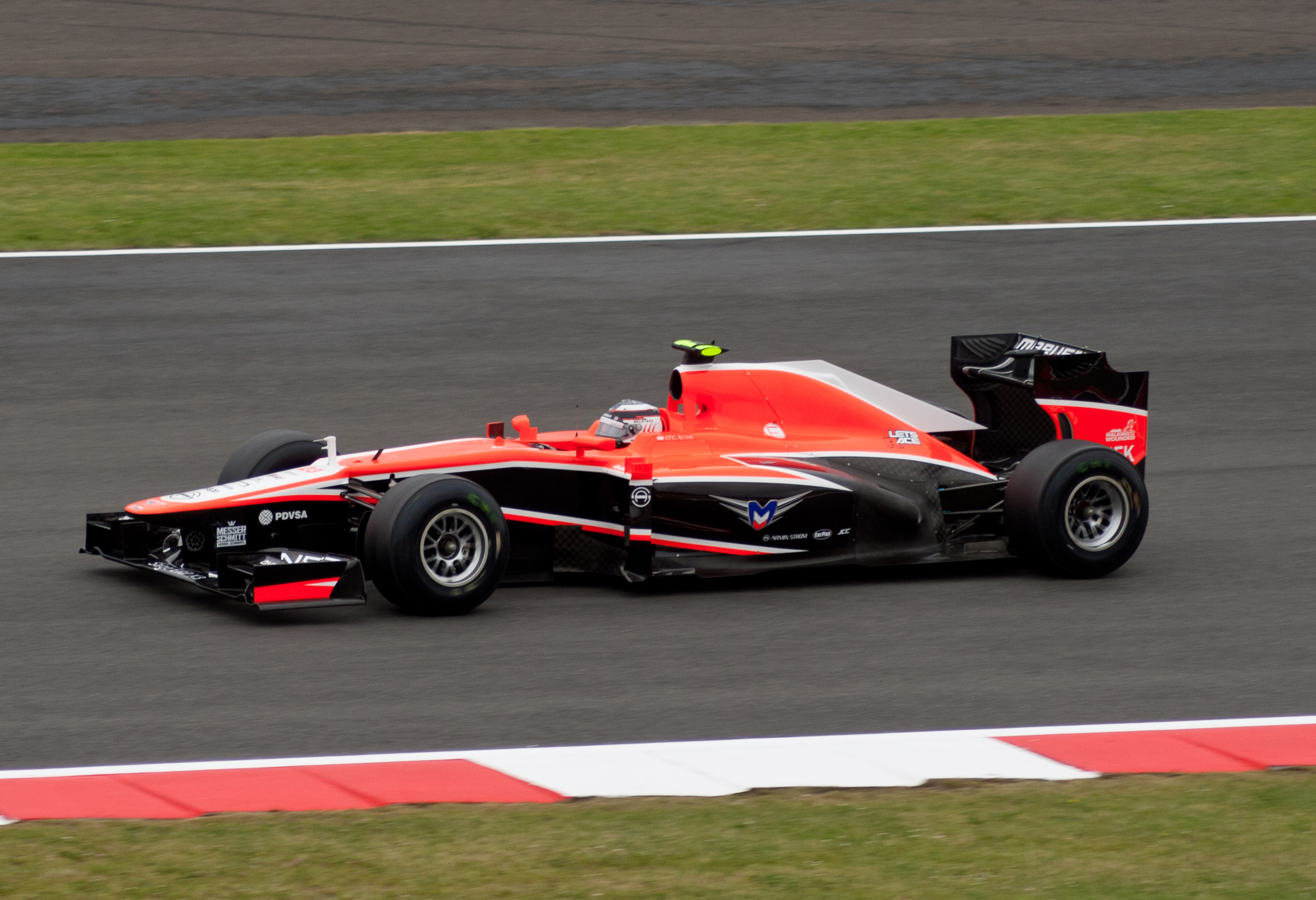
Chilton at his home race, the British Grand Prix

The car received its first technical updates at the Chinese Grand Prix, where Bianchi and Chilton finished in fifteenth and seventeenth place respectively, once again ahead of the Caterhams. Charles Pic out-qualified and finished ahead of both MR02s in Bahrain, but the team retained their position in the World Constructors' Championship courtesy of Bianchi's thirteenth-place finish in Malaysia.

The team eventually finished a de facto tenth in the Constructors' Championship, with no points but ahead of Caterham due to a better finishing record.

== Complete Formula One results ==
(key) (results in bold indicate pole position; results in italics indicate fastest lap)

Year	Entrant	Engine	Tyres	Drivers	Grands Prix																			Points	WCC
Year	Entrant	Engine	Tyres	Drivers	AUS	MAL	CHN	BHR	ESP	MON	CAN	GBR	GER	HUN	BEL	ITA	SIN	KOR	JPN	IND	ABU	USA	BRA	Points	WCC
2013	Marussia F1 Team	Cosworth CA2013K	**P**	Jules Bianchi	15	13	15	19	18	Ret	17	16	Ret	16	18	19	18	16	Ret	18	20	18	17	0	10th
2013	Marussia F1 Team	Cosworth CA2013K	**P**	Max Chilton	17	16	17	20	19	14	19	17	19	17	19	20	17	17	19	17	21	21	19	0	10th
