= Gill Jones =

Gill Ganderton
- Born: Gill Hall; 1972 or 1973
- Citizenship: British

Gill Ganderton (née Hall, formerly Jones; born 1972 or 1973) is a British Formula One engineer. She works as the Trackside Electronics Leader for the Red Bull Racing team.

== Career ==
Jones was educated at Longbenton High School in Newcastle and graduated with a degree in Electrical and Electronic Engineering from Northumbria University, after which she worked in the aerospace industry. Gill began her Formula One career in 2000 with Jaguar Racing in an electronics testing role. In 2003 she worked for Toyota Racing as an electronics engineer on Olivier Panis' car and in 2004 at British American Racing with Takuma Sato. She then returned to Milton Keynes and Red Bull Racing to take care of the electronics in races and testing. Her first race was the 2005 Chinese Grand Prix where she worked on Christian Klien's car.

At the 2013 Bahrain Grand Prix, she became the second female F1 team member in history to receive the winning manufacturer's trophy on the podium.
