= 2012 Brazilian Grand Prix =

Formula One motor race held in 2012

Race 20 of 20 in the 2012 Formula One World Championship
← Previous race	Next race →

Race details
- Date: 25 November 2012
- Official name: Formula 1 Grande Prêmio Petrobras do Brasil 2012
- Location: Autódromo José Carlos Pace, São Paulo, Brazil
- Course: Permanent racing facility
- Course length: 4.309 km (2.677 miles)
- Distance: 71 laps, 305.909 km (190.083 miles)
- Weather: Race start:Light rain shower getting heavier at the end. Air Temp 19 °C (66 °F) Track Temp 21 °C (70 °F)

Pole position
Driver	(United Kingdom) Lewis Hamilton	McLaren-Mercedes
- Time: 1:12.458

Fastest lap
Driver	(United Kingdom) Lewis Hamilton	McLaren-Mercedes
- Time: 1:18.069 on lap 38

Podium
First	(United Kingdom) Jenson Button	McLaren-Mercedes
Second	(Spain) Fernando Alonso	Ferrari
Third	(Brazil) Felipe Massa	Ferrari

The 2012 Brazilian Grand Prix (formally known as the Formula 1 Grande Prêmio Petrobras do Brasil 2012) was a Formula One motor race that took place at the Autódromo José Carlos Pace in São Paulo, Brazil, on 25 November 2012. The race was the twentieth and final round of the 2012 Formula One World Championship, and marked the forty-first running of the Brazilian Grand Prix. The race was won by Jenson Button driving for McLaren, scoring the 15th and last victory of his Formula One career, as well as McLaren's last Grand Prix victory until Daniel Ricciardo's victory at the 2021 Italian Grand Prix and the last win for a British driver for McLaren until Lando Norris won the 2024 Miami Grand Prix.

It was at this race that Sebastian Vettel won the 2012 World Drivers' Championship, his third title in a row. Fernando Alonso finished second in both the race and the championship and had the provisional championship lead at a late stage of the race, before Vettel moved up the order to have a three-point cushion. The race also marked the 306th and final one for Michael Schumacher, after he announced his retirement for the second time. He also scored his final Formula One points by finishing seventh just behind eventual champion Vettel.

== Report ==
=== Background ===
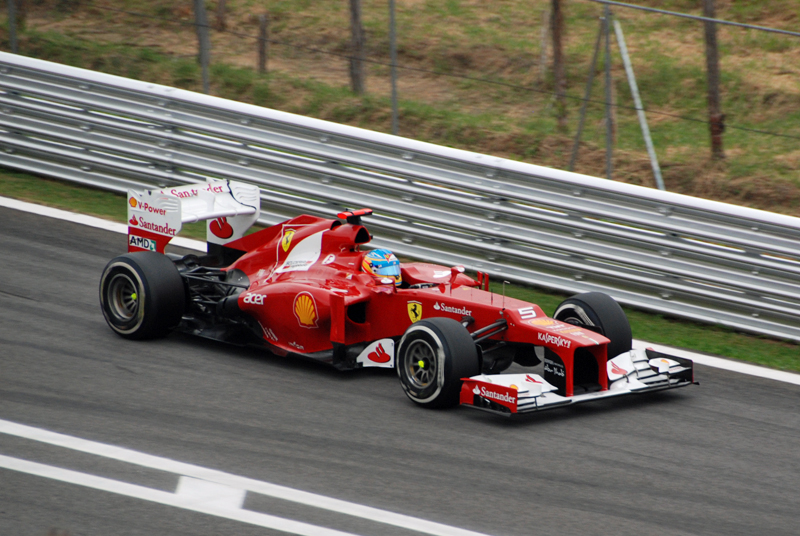
Fernando Alonso needed to overcome a 13-point deficit to Sebastian Vettel.

The 2012 Brazilian Grand Prix marked Michael Schumacher's final race before his second retirement and was also the last race for Bruno Senna, Vitaly Petrov, Timo Glock, Pedro de la Rosa, Narain Karthikeyan, and the HRT Formula 1 Team. HRT in their history did not score a point, and withdrew because of financial issues.

Tyre supplier Pirelli provided teams with early prototypes of their compounds for the 2013 Formula One season during Friday practice for testing and review. Pirelli brought its silver-banded hard compound tyre as the harder "prime" tyre and the white-banded medium compound tyre as the softer option tyre, as opposed to 2011 Brazilian Grand Prix when they brought the medium and soft compound dry tyres.

=== Championship permutations ===
In order to become world champion for the third time, Sebastian Vettel needed to defend a 13-point advantage over Fernando Alonso, meaning the latter needed at least third place even if the former failed to score. Conversely, a fourth place was sufficient for Vettel even if Alonso won, and thus he was the odds-on favourite.

	Vettel would have won if:	
	(Germany) Sebastian Vettel	(Spain) Fernando Alonso
Pos.	4th or better	Eliminated
Pos.	5th, 6th or 7th	2nd or lower
Pos.	8th or 9th	3rd or lower
Pos.	10th or lower	4th or lower

	Alonso would have won if:	
	(Spain) Fernando Alonso	(Germany) Sebastian Vettel
Pos.	1st	5th or lower
Pos.	2nd	8th or lower
Pos.	3rd	10th or lower
Pos.	4th or lower	11th or lower

=== Free practice ===
During free practice on Friday and Saturday, it was Lewis Hamilton and McLaren who set the pace, closely followed by championship contender Vettel and his Red Bull teammate Mark Webber. While Hamilton topped the time sheets in both Friday sessions, Jenson Button was quickest during the third session on Saturday morning.

Fernando Alonso had a difficult first free practice, trailing Vettel by 0.465 seconds, twice as much as in previous races. He was able to lap faster than the German on the harder compound tyres in the second session. Ferrari looked stronger during the long run trials with Felipe Massa putting in the most consistently fast lap times, 0.1 seconds ahead of Hamilton. With high temperatures, tyre degradation was a concern for the teams in the paddock; Hamilton commented that "it felt almost as though I was sliding around the track with the tyres melting".

=== Qualifying ===
"I'm grateful to be able to put the car on the front row and to have had my last qualifying with McLaren as a one–two."

— Lewis Hamilton commenting on taking pole position.

After the very warm practice sessions, qualifying on Saturday was run under difficult weather conditions. Qualifying one (Q1) started on a damp track and therefore on intermediate tyres, while by Q2 the track was almost dry and slick tyres were used. In Q1, Romain Grosjean collided with the slower running HRT of Pedro de la Rosa and lost his front wing. While he succeeded in nursing the car back into the pit lane, he was unable to change his tyres and was therefore left in a disappointing 18th position on the grid. Michael Schumacher's last ever qualifying did not go well either. He took 14th position, almost half a second down on his teammate, admitting he had perhaps compromised his setup too much for an expected wet race.

The McLarens were fastest all weekend and easily took the front row, with Lewis Hamilton securing his last pole position with the team. Title contenders Vettel and Alonso both struggled, taking 4th and 8th position on the grid respectively. Pastor Maldonado was handed a 10-place grid penalty for missing the weighbridge in the second part of qualifying. He dropped from sixth to 16th, moving Alonso one place up to seventh.

=== Race ===
==== Pre-race ====
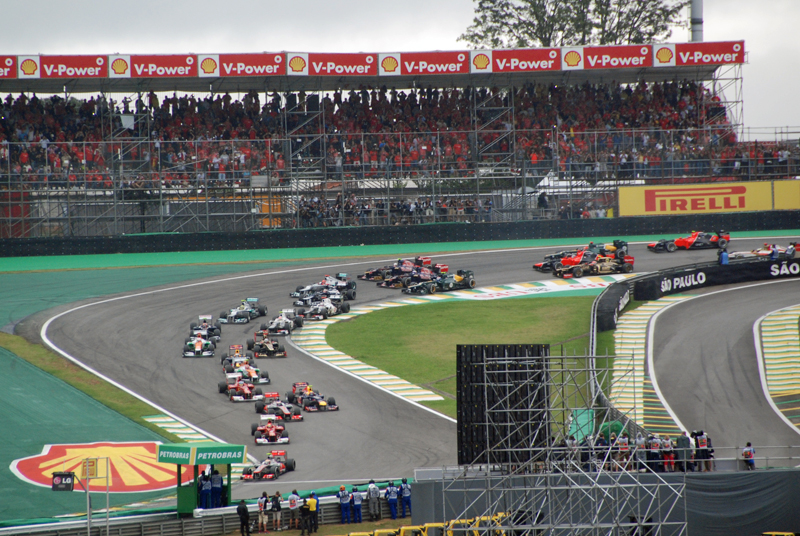
Start of the race

Title contender Alonso and Ferrari were hoping for damp conditions during the race, stating: "Wet races are a bit more unpredictable so we need some kind of damp race with many things happening, because we know that in normal conditions, fighting for the championship will be very difficult." Felipe Massa discounted rumours he might try to help Alonso win the title by forcing Vettel into retirement, stating: "I've always been an honest person and an honest driver. And that will continue to be the case. My limit is the limit of the regulations, and I will stay true to this limit."

==== Race report ====
With only light rain just 10 minutes before the start, all teams opted to start on slick tyres. Vettel got away poorly, dropping to seventh position, while his rival Alonso moved up into fifth. Vettel and Bruno Senna collided at turn 4 in a racing incident, which saw Vettel spin while Senna ended up hitting the rear of Pérez. Vettel suffered damage to his left sidepod but was able to carry on, albeit in 22nd position. The reigning world champion began to move up the order, as there was close racing for position at the front of the field as well. Massa helped his teammate overtake Mark Webber on lap two going into the Senna-S, giving the Spaniard the crucial third position he would need to win the title. Alonso lost the position again to the fast running Force India of Nico Hülkenberg after running wide on lap four. Maldonado crashed out on lap two, when he lost control of his car on the kerb through the inside of turn 3, and crashed into the tyre barrier on the exit of the corner.

Rain began to fall during the next few laps and the first cars made pit stops for intermediate tyres, including the two title contenders, while Button and Hülkenberg stayed out. This proved to be the right decision since the rain decreased shortly afterwards and cars on intermediates were forced to pit for slick tyres once again. Hülkenberg continued his strong performance by overtaking Button for the lead at the end of lap 18 (their official time differential at the finish line at the end of that lap was 0.000).

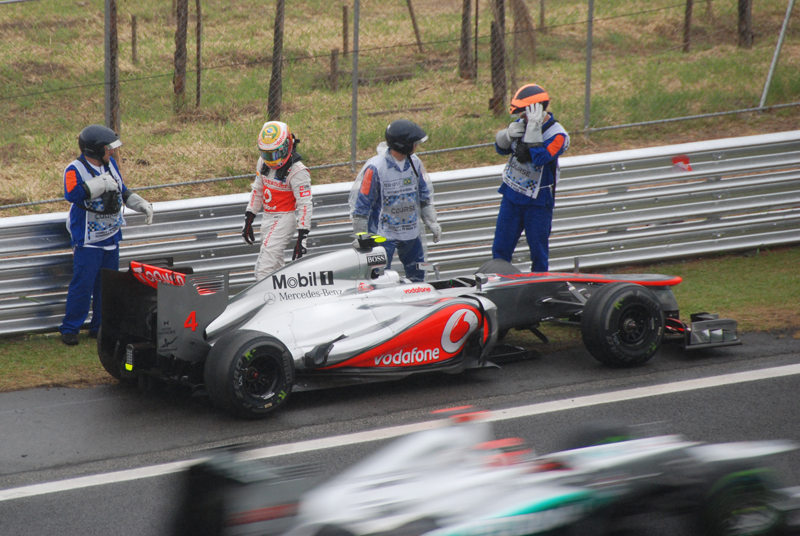
Lewis Hamilton retired from the lead of the race on lap 54.

With the two cars in front leading the field by almost a minute, debris on the track brought out the safety car on lap 23. At this point, Alonso and Vettel were running in fourth and fifth place. At the restart on lap 29, Kamui Kobayashi took fifth position from Vettel. The damage on the Red Bull car slowed Vettel down considerably more in dry conditions, and Massa helped his teammate by overtaking the German shortly after. Meanwhile, at the front, Hamilton took second from his teammate and was able to pass Hülkenberg when the German half-spun. Hülkenberg pursued the McLaren but slid into him on lap 54, leaving Hamilton out of the race with damage to the left front suspension and himself with a drive-through penalty, handing Button the lead.

When the rain started again, Vettel was one of the first to pit for intermediates. Since his radio had failed, the team was not ready for him, causing a long delay. Ferrari timed Massa's pit stop well, letting Alonso take second position from him. Vettel took sixth position from Michael Schumacher, which proved sufficient to retain the title even with Alonso finishing second.

The race ended after Paul di Resta crashed on the start/finish straight shortly before the end, bringing out the safety car once again until the conclusion of the race. Vitaly Petrov of Caterham took 11th position, which meant his team overtook Marussia in the Constructors' Championship. Former world champion Kimi Räikkönen had an eventful race as well, almost crashing into Vettel after the start and later trying to use an escape road only to find it to be a dead end. He later stated the way had been open 11 years prior, having made the same manoeuver at the 2001 Brazilian Grand Prix. He also had a close contest with the retiring Schumacher, who finished seventh after recovering from an early puncture but gave up sixth to Vettel in order to help him extend his small point advantage over Alonso in the championship. This was Button's 15th Formula One victory and Vettel became the 2012 world champion.

=== Post-race ===
"I think everything that could go wrong went wrong. As a matter of fact, though, I think we always kept believing. ... I think they tried everything to make it even harder for us, not just the others but also the circumstances: as I said, with the damage on the car, losing radio, in these conditions, when communication is so crucial, stopping just a lap too early, not having the tyres ready because communication wasn't there. Where do you start, really? I think you guys had your show and we had to really fight until the end."

— Sebastian Vettel during the post-race press conference.

The race received widespread acclaim, with The Guardian calling it a "rollercoaster". Three-time world champions Niki Lauda and Nelson Piquet stated that they had never seen a race like it. German magazine Der Spiegel deemed the race "spectacular" and "historic" due to the record-breaking 147 successful overtaking manoeuvres carried out during the race. Reuters said that "the Brazilian weather produced a thriller to stand the test of time against some of the sport's great races". Sebastian Vettel himself called it his "toughest race ever". This race has been retrospectively noted for its dramatic nature.

At age 25, Vettel became the youngest triple world champion of the sport, six years younger than Ayrton Senna had been in the 1991 Formula One season. On drawing level with Senna, Vettel commented: "To win that third title here, where one of my greatest idols, Ayrton Senna, was from, it is very difficult to imagine I join him and other great names by winning three successive titles". Red Bull's team principal Christian Horner praised his driver, saying: "Sebastian has driven better than ever this season and has fought his way back into this championship, he's never given up and you saw that in today's race."

The Daily Mirror lauded Red Bull designer Adrian Newey for making the decision to change the engine mapping on Vettel's car after reviewing photos of the damage sustained in the first lap accident. Newey was quoted saying: "So we photographed it going past, saw huge crease in exhaust, which usually means it will soon crack and the bodywork catch fire. ... So we changed the engine mapping to keep the exhaust as cool as we could, even though it meant lost performance."

"I didn't win the title, but I won so much respect from everybody."

— Fernando Alonso after the race.

Championship runner-up Fernando Alonso expressed pride for his team, going so far as to call the 2012 Formula One season "the best season of my career". During the podium interview with Nelson Piquet, he asserted: "Obviously we lost the championship now, but I don't think, as you said, that we lost here in Brazil, we lost in some races where we were a little bit unlucky. But this is a sport, but when you do something with your heart, when you do something with 100 per cent, you have to be proud of your team, happy for them, and we will try next year." The press later pointed out Alonso's "grace after the race", contrasting him to Vettel who had criticized the competition's "dirty tricks" during his post-race press conference.

Speaking about his victory, Jenson Button congratulated his team, saying: "This is the perfect way to end the season. We have had ups and downs and to end on a high bodes well for 2013." His victory in this race would turn out to be his last in Formula One. It would also be McLaren's last victory until the 2021 Italian Grand Prix, which was won by Daniel Ricciardo.

Upon his second and final retirement from the sport, Michael Schumacher commented on the three years at Mercedes GP. He said: "I have tried that mission to end successful. It didn't work this time but I'm quite happy to finish from here and go for a different life again." Commenting on the outcome of the season, former team owner Eddie Jordan said he believed Alonso would have deserved the title more, considering the "less competitive machine". BBC columnist and former Formula One driver Jaime Alguersuari took a different viewpoint, saying the German deserved the title, having gone into the last race with "the most difficult position ... – he had everything to lose".

Three days after the race, Ferrari announced they were contemplating filing an appeal with the FIA due to video footage allegedly showing Vettel overtaking Jean-Éric Vergne under yellow flags. Should the allegations have proven valid, the FIA could have added 20 seconds to Vettel's finishing time, demoting him to 8th in the race result, handing the driver's title to Alonso. Just two days later, Ferrari opted not to appeal the result after receiving additional information from the FIA clarifying that Vettel's overtake on Vergne happened under green flags. Formula One CEO Bernie Ecclestone had previously stated that he considered Ferrari's allegations "a shame" and "a joke".

After losing 10th place in the Constructors' Championship to Caterham, Marussia's director of engineering Nikolai Fomenko accused driver Charles Pic of deliberately letting Vitaly Petrov pass him due to Pic having already signed a contract with Caterham for the next season. No actions were taken following these accusations. In August 2018, Red Bull team principal Christian Horner revealed that Vettel felt that his teammate Mark Webber was responsible for his bad start by pushing him towards the wall in the first turn of the race, and that the Multi 21 controversy at the 2013 Malaysian Grand Prix was Vettel's payback for it.

== Classification ==
=== Qualifying ===
Pos.	No.	Driver	Constructor	Part 1	Part 2	Part 3	Grid
1	4	(United Kingdom) Lewis Hamilton	McLaren-Mercedes	1:15.075	1:13.398	1:12.458	1
2	3	(United Kingdom) Jenson Button	McLaren-Mercedes	1:15.456	1:13.515	1:12.513	2
3	2	(Australia) Mark Webber	Red Bull-Renault	1:16.180	1:13.667	1:12.581	3
4	1	(Germany) Sebastian Vettel	Red Bull-Renault	1:15.644	1:13.209	1:12.760	4
5	6	(Brazil) Felipe Massa	Ferrari	1:16.263	1:14.048	1:12.987	5
6	18	(Venezuela) Pastor Maldonado	Williams-Renault	1:16.266	1:13.698	1:13.174	16^{1}
7	12	(Germany) Nico Hülkenberg	Force India-Mercedes	1:15.536	1:13.704	1:13.206	6
8	5	(Spain) Fernando Alonso	Ferrari	1:16.097	1:13.856	1:13.253	7
9	9	(Finland) Kimi Räikkönen	Lotus-Renault	1:16.432	1:13.698	1:13.298	8
10	8	(Germany) Nico Rosberg	Mercedes	1:15.929	1:13.848	1:13.489	9
11	11	(United Kingdom) Paul di Resta	Force India-Mercedes	1:15.901	1:14.121		10
12	19	(Brazil) Bruno Senna	Williams-Renault	1:15.333	1:14.219		11
13	15	(Mexico) Sergio Pérez	Sauber-Ferrari	1:15.974	1:14.234		12
14	7	(Germany) Michael Schumacher	Mercedes	1:16.005	1:14.334		13
15	14	(Japan) Kamui Kobayashi	Sauber-Ferrari	1:16.400	1:14.380		14
16	16	(Australia) Daniel Ricciardo	Toro Rosso-Ferrari	1:16.744	1:14.574		15
17	17	(France) Jean-Éric Vergne	Toro Rosso-Ferrari	1:16.722	1:14.619		17
18	10	(France) Romain Grosjean	Lotus-Renault	1:16.967			18
19	21	(Russia) Vitaly Petrov	Caterham-Renault	1:17.073			19
20	20	(Finland) Heikki Kovalainen	Caterham-Renault	1:17.086			20
21	24	(Germany) Timo Glock	Marussia-Cosworth	1:17.508			21
22	25	(France) Charles Pic	Marussia-Cosworth	1:18.104			22
23	23	(India) Narain Karthikeyan	HRT-Cosworth	1:19.576			23
24	22	(Spain) Pedro de la Rosa	HRT-Cosworth	1:19.699			24^{2}
107% time: 1:20.330

Notes

- ^1 – Pastor Maldonado received a ten-place grid penalty after receiving his 3rd reprimand of the season, for missing a call in to the weighbridge from the FIA.
- ^2 – Pedro de la Rosa received a five-place grid penalty for replacing his gearbox.

=== Race ===
Pos	No	Driver	Constructor	Laps	Time/Retired	Grid	Points
1	3	(United Kingdom) Jenson Button	McLaren-Mercedes	71	1:45:22.656	2	25
2	5	(Spain) Fernando Alonso	Ferrari	71	+2.754	7	18
3	6	(Brazil) Felipe Massa	Ferrari	71	+3.615	5	15
4	2	(Australia) Mark Webber	Red Bull-Renault	71	+4.936	3	12
5	12	(Germany) Nico Hülkenberg	Force India-Mercedes	71	+5.708	6	10
6	1	(Germany) Sebastian Vettel	Red Bull-Renault	71	+9.453	4	8
7	7	(Germany) Michael Schumacher	Mercedes	71	+11.907	13	6
8	17	(France) Jean-Éric Vergne	Toro Rosso-Ferrari	71	+28.653	17	4
9	14	(Japan) Kamui Kobayashi	Sauber-Ferrari	71	+31.250	14	2
10	9	(Finland) Kimi Räikkönen	Lotus-Renault	70	+1 Lap	8	1
11	21	(Russia) Vitaly Petrov	Caterham-Renault	70	+1 Lap	19	
12	25	(France) Charles Pic	Marussia-Cosworth	70	+1 Lap	22	
13	16	(Australia) Daniel Ricciardo	Toro Rosso-Ferrari	70	+1 Lap	15	
14	20	(Finland) Heikki Kovalainen	Caterham-Renault	70	+1 Lap	20	
15	8	(Germany) Nico Rosberg	Mercedes	70	+1 Lap	9	
16	24	(Germany) Timo Glock	Marussia-Cosworth	70	+1 Lap	21	
17	22	(Spain) Pedro de la Rosa	HRT-Cosworth	69	+2 Laps	24	
18	23	(India) Narain Karthikeyan	HRT-Cosworth	69	+2 Laps	23	
19	11	(United Kingdom) Paul di Resta	Force India-Mercedes	68	Accident	10	
Ret	4	(United Kingdom) Lewis Hamilton	McLaren-Mercedes	54	Collision	1	
Ret	10	(France) Romain Grosjean	Lotus-Renault	5	Accident	18	
Ret	18	(Venezuela) Pastor Maldonado	Williams-Renault	1	Accident	16	
Ret	19	(Brazil) Bruno Senna	Williams-Renault	0	Collision	11	
Ret	15	(Mexico) Sergio Pérez	Sauber-Ferrari	0	Collision	12	

== Final Championship standings ==
- Bold text and an asterisk indicates the World Champions.

Drivers' Championship standings

	Pos.	Driver	Points
	1	(Germany) Sebastian Vettel*	281
	2	(Spain) Fernando Alonso	278
	3	(Finland) Kimi Räikkönen	207
	4	(United Kingdom) Lewis Hamilton	190
1	5	(United Kingdom) Jenson Button	188

Constructors' Championship standings

Pos.	Constructor	Points
1	(Austria) Red Bull-Renault*	460
2	(Italy) Ferrari	400
3	(United Kingdom) McLaren-Mercedes	378
4	(United Kingdom) Lotus-Renault	303
5	(Germany) Mercedes	142

Notes:
- Only the top five positions are included for both sets of standings.

Previous race: 2012 United States Grand Prix	FIA Formula One World Championship; 2012 season	Next race: 2013 Australian Grand Prix
Previous race: 2011 Brazilian Grand Prix	Brazilian Grand Prix	Next race: 2013 Brazilian Grand Prix
