= 2014 Australian Grand Prix =

Formula One motor race held in 2014

Race 1 of 19 in the 2014 Formula One World Championship
Next race →

Race details
- Date: 16 March 2014
- Official name: 2014 Formula 1 Rolex Australian Grand Prix
- Location: Melbourne Grand Prix Circuit, Melbourne, Australia
- Course: Temporary street circuit
- Course length: 5.303 km (3.295 miles)
- Distance: 57 laps, 302.271 km (187.822 miles)
- Scheduled distance: 58 laps, 307.574 km (191.118 miles)
- Weather: Overcast, 19 °C(66 °F)
- Attendance: 100,500

Pole position
Driver	(United Kingdom) Lewis Hamilton	Mercedes
- Time: 1:44.231

Fastest lap
Driver	(Germany) Nico Rosberg	Mercedes
- Time: 1:32.478 on lap 19

Podium
First	(Germany) Nico Rosberg	Mercedes
Second	(Denmark) Kevin Magnussen	McLaren-Mercedes
Third	(United Kingdom) Jenson Button	McLaren-Mercedes

The 2014 Australian Grand Prix (formally known as the 2014 Formula 1 Rolex Australian Grand Prix) was a Formula One motor race that was held on 16 March 2014 in Melbourne. The race was contested over 58 laps of the Melbourne Grand Prix Circuit and was the first round of the 2014 FIA Formula One World Championship. It marked the debut of new Formula One regulations which introduced 1.6-litre turbocharged V6 engines to the sport, the first time since the 1988 Australian Grand Prix that turbocharged engines have been used in Formula One. It was the 79th race in the combined history of the Australian Grand Prix – which dates back to the 100 Miles Road Race of 1928 – and the 19th time the event was held at the Melbourne Grand Prix Circuit. The race also marked the thirtieth year that the Australian Grand Prix was run as a round of the Formula One World Championship.

The race was won by German driver Nico Rosberg in a Mercedes F1 W05. It was Rosberg's fourth Grand Prix victory and completed a rare double in the Australian Grand Prix, winning a race his father Keke had won in Adelaide in 1985, the first time Australia hosted a World Championship race. This feat had previously been achieved by Stan and Alan Jones and Graham and Damon Hill. Rosberg had earlier achieved the same feat in the Monaco Grand Prix as well. Kevin Magnussen finished second in a McLaren MP4-29 on his Formula One debut, the first, and, as of 2024, only podium finish in a World Championship Grand Prix by a Danish driver and Magnussen's only podium. Third was Jenson Button in the second McLaren, who recorded his 50th and final Formula One podium with the result (although he did not take part in the podium ceremony as the stewards had yet to disqualify Daniel Ricciardo). Daniil Kvyat, aged 19, in his debut race, was classified in ninth, becoming the youngest points-scorer in Formula One until Max Verstappen at the 2015 Malaysian Grand Prix. Australian driver Daniel Ricciardo originally finished in second place for Red Bull Racing, but was later disqualified due to illegal fuel flow throughout the race.

The race marked the end of Sebastian Vettel's streak of nine race wins in a row. Magnussen and Button's podium finishes were the last for McLaren until the 2019 Brazilian Grand Prix and last double podium until the 2021 Italian Grand Prix; it later turned out to be the only career podium for Magnussen. The result meant that Rosberg occupied the lead of the World Drivers' Championship for the first time in his career. This race also marked the last time that McLaren led the Constructors' Championship until the 2024 Azerbaijan Grand Prix.

== Report ==
=== Background ===
Tyre supplier Pirelli brought its white-banded medium compound tyre as the harder "prime" tyre and the yellow-banded soft compound tyre as the softer "option" tyre, as opposed to the previous year where medium and super-soft selections were provided.

=== Qualifying ===
Daniel Ricciardo set the early pace in his debut for Red Bull Racing, while Lotus struggled, with Pastor Maldonado failing to set a time and Romain Grosjean qualifying 21st, which became 20th when Esteban Gutiérrez was given a penalty for a gearbox change in his Sauber. Max Chilton out-qualified his Marussia teammate Jules Bianchi, but missed out on a place in Q2 by one hundredth of a second. Caterham driver Marcus Ericsson was the final driver eliminated in Q1, with his teammate Kamui Kobayashi overcoming a lack of running in Free Practice to advance to the next period.

Rain began to fall in Q2, with the slippery conditions claiming their first victim in Kimi Räikkönen, who spun his Ferrari late in the period. Räikkönen's accident interrupted the laps of several drivers, with Jenson Button and reigning World Champion Sebastian Vettel both reporting that Räikkönen's accident prevented them from advancing to Q3. It was later found that Vettel was also hindered by engine problems, which had plagued him since FP3 that morning. Sauber's Adrian Sutil finished the period in fourteenth, with Kamui Kobayashi fifteenth after Sergio Pérez spun his Force India on his final flying lap.

The rain intensified in the final period, with several drivers venturing out on full wet tyres. Mercedes drivers Lewis Hamilton and Nico Rosberg, and Ricciardo, started a three-way battle for pole that came down to their final laps. Hamilton prevailed, with Ricciardo qualifying a career-best second in his home race. Rosberg started from third, alongside Kevin Magnussen, who qualified his McLaren fourth in his Formula One debut. After Räikkönen's Q2 accident had left him twelfth, Fernando Alonso gave Ferrari a decent result when he recovered to fifth after making the wrong tyre choice early in the period and started next to the Toro Rosso of Jean-Éric Vergne. Force India's Nico Hülkenberg and debutant Daniil Kvyat filled the next row of the grid, ahead of the Williams pair of Felipe Massa and Valtteri Bottas, who, like Gutiérrez, was demoted five places for a gearbox change.

=== Post-qualifying ===
Kevin Magnussen and Sebastian Vettel were referred to the stewards for speeding under yellow flags following Räikkönen's accident, but they were cleared of any wrongdoing. Fernando Alonso was called to the stewards for impeding Esteban Gutiérrez in Q1, but also escaped a penalty. Pastor Maldonado failed to post a lap time during qualifying. He was allowed to start the race on the stewards' discretion, who judged that he was capable of lapping within the 107% limit based on his free practice times.

=== Race ===
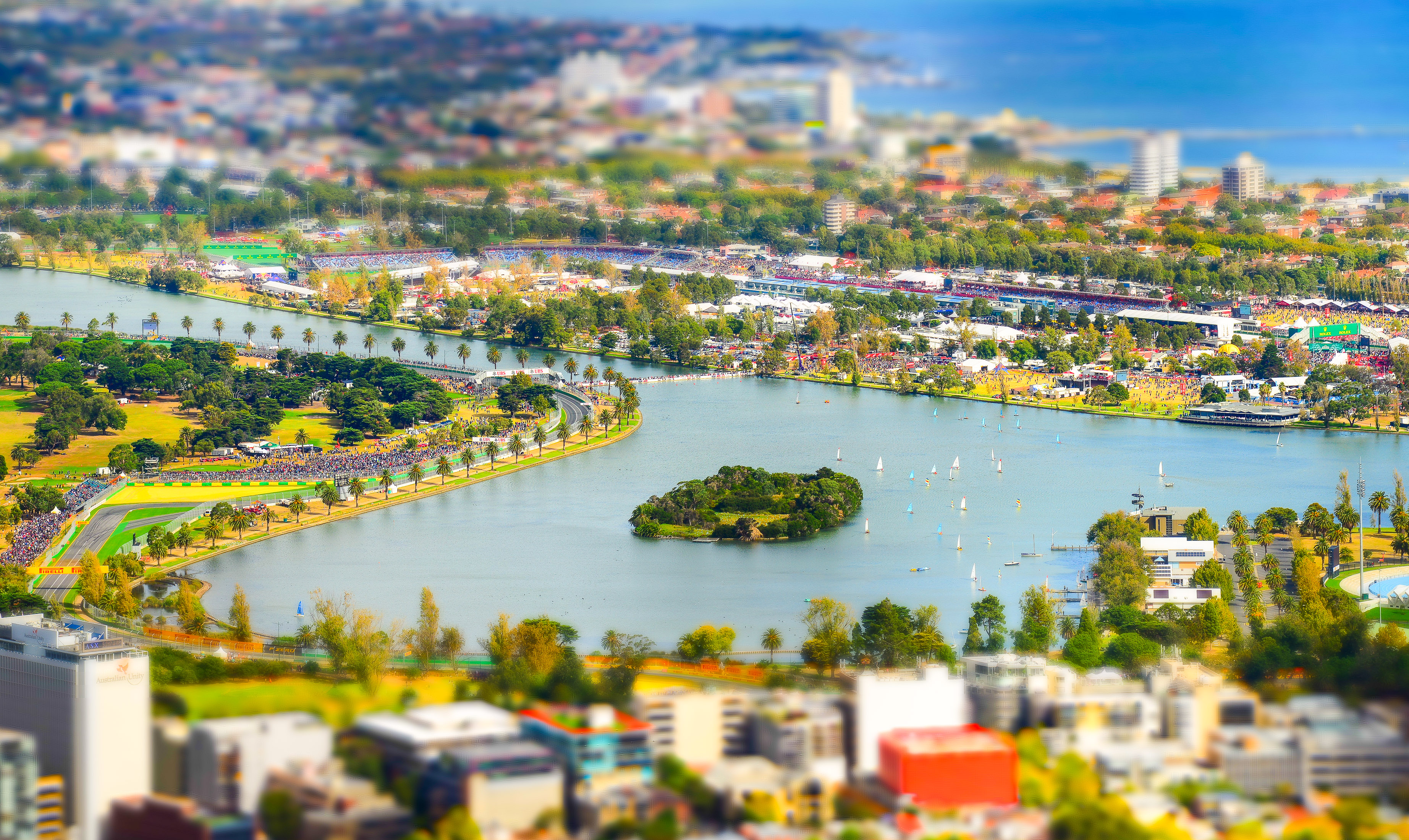
The 2014 Australian Grand Prix, as viewed from the Eureka Skydeck

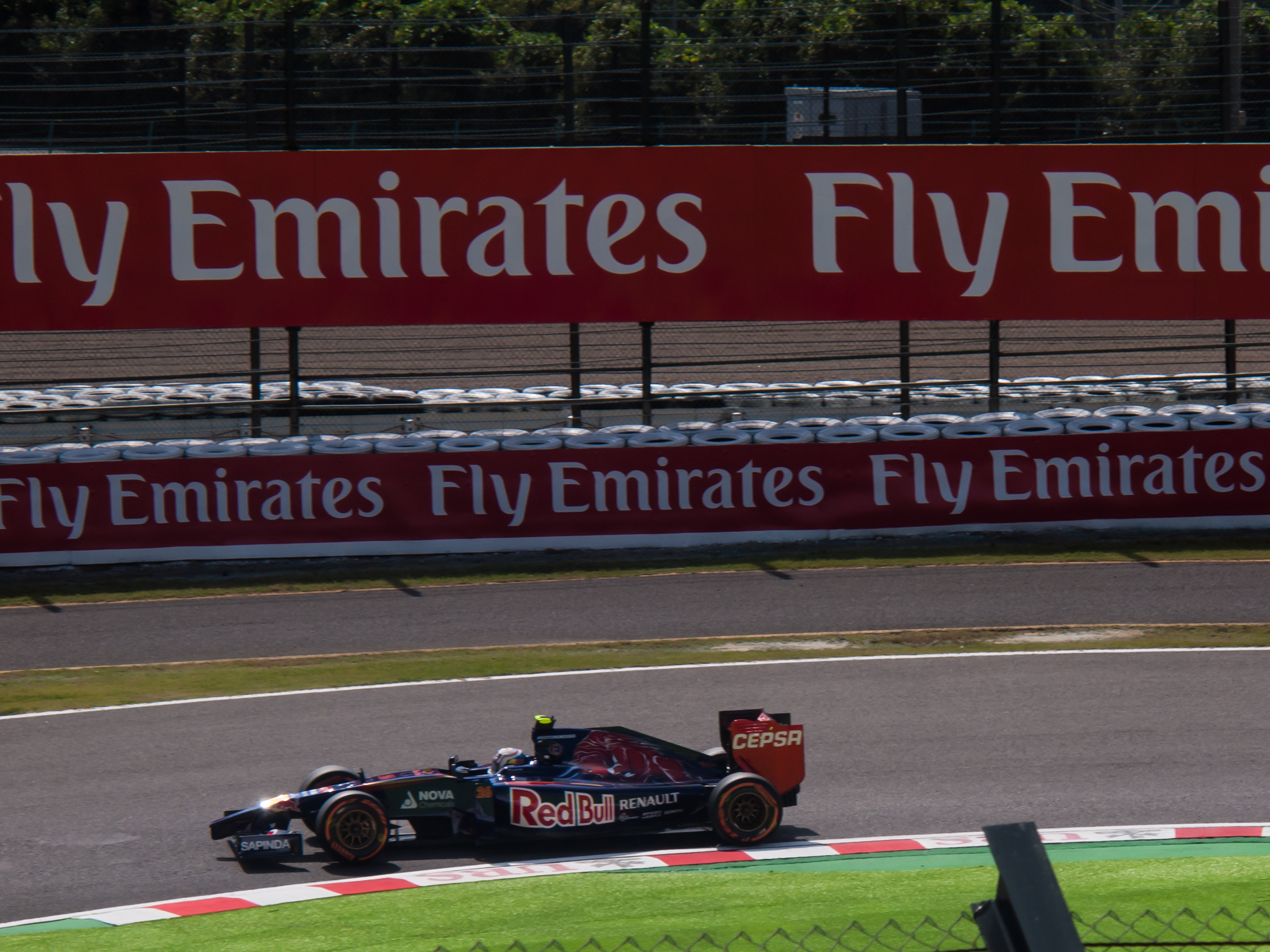
Daniil Kvyat (pictured at the Japanese Grand Prix) became the youngest driver to score a point. He has lost this record since 2015.

The race began at 17:00 local time. Marussia drivers Max Chilton and Jules Bianchi stalled on the grid, with Bianchi having a problem after the formation lap and Chilton stalling at the beginning of the formation lap. Romain Grosjean started the race from the pit lane due to car modifications under parc fermé conditions and received a drive-through penalty for leaving the garage before the 15-minute signal. Seconds after the lights had gone out, Felipe Massa, Kamui Kobayashi and Kimi Räikkönen were involved in a first-lap collision, putting Kobayashi and Massa out of the race whilst Räikkönen's Ferrari did not suffer any major damage and was able to continue the race without further problems. It was later confirmed Kobayashi had suffered a loss of rear brakes.

Polesitter Lewis Hamilton's engine lost a cylinder at the start of the race, which resulted in him dropping to third by the first corner. Nico Rosberg got a good start, allowing him to pass Daniel Ricciardo in addition to his teammate, and at the first corner Rosberg led, with Ricciardo second and Hamilton third. Hamilton continued to slip down the order with his engine running on five cylinders - having fallen from first to fifth by the end of lap one - and on the second lap he was called into the pits to retire. Defending world champion Sebastian Vettel also had an early retirement due to engine issues, retiring on lap three. Ericsson retired on lap 29 with oil pressure problem, and both Lotus cars also retired due to power unit issues. Rosberg dominantly won the race by almost twenty-five seconds, picking up his fourth career win, and his first since the previous year's British Grand Prix. Daniel Ricciardo snatched second in front of his home crowd, making him the first Australian Formula One driver to finish on the podium in his home race as a world championship round. John Smith finished on the podium in 1983, but at the time, it was not yet an official Formula One world championship round. Kevin Magnussen finished third, two seconds behind Ricciardo. This made him the first Formula One debutant since Lewis Hamilton at the 2007 Australian Grand Prix seven years earlier to finish on the podium.

Magnussen's teammate Jenson Button took fourth after starting eleventh, finishing just over 3 seconds behind his teammate and half a minute behind Rosberg. He was followed by Fernando Alonso in fifth. Valtteri Bottas finished in sixth despite clipping the wall and causing a puncture on the right rear tire on lap 11. Nico Hülkenberg finished seventh, 2013 winner Kimi Räikkönen eighth, Jean-Éric Vergne in ninth and debutant Daniil Kvyat in tenth, becoming the youngest points-scorer in Formula One. The Ferraris suffered some electrical problems in the race, according to the team.

=== Post race ===
Daniel Ricciardo was disqualified from the race for a breach of Article 5.1.4 of the Formula One Technical Regulations, which govern the maximum allowable rate at which fuel may flow into the engine. The team were also referred to the stewards for using an unauthorized method of measuring the fuel flow. Magnussen was thus promoted to second with Jenson Button up to third. It was Button's 50th and final podium finish, but the podium ceremony took place before Ricciardo's exclusion which meant Button did not take part in the proceedings.

Red Bull immediately announced their intention to appeal the disqualification, claiming that the sensors provided by the FIA to measure the fuel flow were unreliable. The appeal was heard by the FIA on 14 April, but it was rejected and the disqualification was upheld. This meant that McLaren got their first double podium since the 2012 Chinese Grand Prix.

Kamui Kobayashi was referred to the stewards as well for his involvement in the first-lap collision with Massa and Räikkönen. The stewards decided not to take any further action against him after they determined that the accident was triggered by a mechanical failure on his Caterham.

== Classification ==
=== Qualifying ===
Pos.	No.	Driver	Constructor	Q1	Q2	Q3	Grid
1	44	(United Kingdom) Lewis Hamilton	Mercedes	1:31.699	1:42.890	1:44.231	1
2	3	(Australia) Daniel Ricciardo	Red Bull Racing-Renault	1:30.775	1:42.295	1:44.548	2
3	6	(Germany) Nico Rosberg	Mercedes	1:32.564	1:42.264	1:44.595	3
4	20	(Denmark) Kevin Magnussen	McLaren-Mercedes	1:30.949	1:43.247	1:45.745	4
5	14	(Spain) Fernando Alonso	Ferrari	1:31.388	1:42.805	1:45.819	5
6	25	(France) Jean-Éric Vergne	Toro Rosso-Renault	1:33.488	1:43.849	1:45.864	6
7	27	(Germany) Nico Hülkenberg	Force India-Mercedes	1:33.893	1:43.658	1:46.030	7
8	26	(Russia) Daniil Kvyat	Toro Rosso-Renault	1:33.777	1:44.331	1:47.368	8
9	19	(Brazil) Felipe Massa	Williams-Mercedes	1:31.228	1:44.242	1:48.079	9
10	77	(Finland) Valtteri Bottas	Williams-Mercedes	1:31.601	1:43.852	1:48.147	15^{1}
11	22	(United Kingdom) Jenson Button	McLaren-Mercedes	1:31.396	1:44.437		10
12	7	(Finland) Kimi Räikkönen	Ferrari	1:32.439	1:44.494		11
13	1	(Germany) Sebastian Vettel	Red Bull Racing-Renault	1:31.931	1:44.668		12
14	99	(Germany) Adrian Sutil	Sauber-Ferrari	1:33.673	1:45.655		13
15	10	(Japan) Kamui Kobayashi	Caterham-Renault	1:34.274	1:45.867		14
16	11	(Mexico) Sergio Pérez	Force India-Mercedes	1:34.141	1:47.293		16
17	4	(United Kingdom) Max Chilton	Marussia-Ferrari	1:34.293			PL^{2}
18	17	(France) Jules Bianchi	Marussia-Ferrari	1:34.794			PL^{2}
19	21	(Mexico) Esteban Gutiérrez	Sauber-Ferrari	1:35.117			20^{1}
20	9	(Sweden) Marcus Ericsson	Caterham-Renault	1:35.157			19
21	8	(France) Romain Grosjean	Lotus-Renault	1:36.993			PL^{2}
107% time: 1:37.129
NC^{3}	13	(Venezuela) Pastor Maldonado	Lotus-Renault	No time^{3}			21

Notes:

- ^1 — Valtteri Bottas and Esteban Gutiérrez were given a five-place grid penalty for changing their gearboxes.
- ^2 — Driver started the race from pit lane.
- ^3 — Pastor Maldonado failed to set a lap time within 107% of the fastest lap time set by Daniel Ricciardo in Q1. He was later given permission to start by race stewards.

=== Race ===
Pos.	No.	Driver	Constructor	Laps	Time/Retired	Grid	Points
1	6	(Germany) Nico Rosberg	Mercedes	57	1:32:58.710	3	25
2	20	(Denmark) Kevin Magnussen	McLaren-Mercedes	57	+26.777	4	18
3	22	(United Kingdom) Jenson Button	McLaren-Mercedes	57	+30.027	10	15
4	14	(Spain) Fernando Alonso	Ferrari	57	+35.284	5	12
5	77	(Finland) Valtteri Bottas	Williams-Mercedes	57	+47.639	15	10
6	27	(Germany) Nico Hülkenberg	Force India-Mercedes	57	+50.718	7	8
7	7	(Finland) Kimi Räikkönen	Ferrari	57	+57.675	11	6
8	25	(France) Jean-Éric Vergne	Toro Rosso-Renault	57	+1:00.441	6	4
9	26	(Russia) Daniil Kvyat	Toro Rosso-Renault	57	+1:03.585	8	2
10	11	(Mexico) Sergio Pérez	Force India-Mercedes	57	+1:25.916	16	1
11	99	(Germany) Adrian Sutil	Sauber-Ferrari	56	+1 Lap	13	
12	21	(Mexico) Esteban Gutiérrez	Sauber-Ferrari	56	+1 Lap	20	
13	4	(United Kingdom) Max Chilton	Marussia-Ferrari	55	+2 Laps	17	
NC^{1}	17	(France) Jules Bianchi	Marussia-Ferrari	49	+8 Laps	18	
Ret	8	(France) Romain Grosjean	Lotus-Renault	43	Electrical	22	
Ret	13	(Venezuela) Pastor Maldonado	Lotus-Renault	29	Electrical	21	
Ret	9	(Sweden) Marcus Ericsson	Caterham-Renault	27	Oil pressure	19	
Ret	1	(Germany) Sebastian Vettel	Red Bull Racing-Renault	3	Engine	12	
Ret	44	(United Kingdom) Lewis Hamilton	Mercedes	2	Engine	1	
Ret	19	(Brazil) Felipe Massa	Williams-Mercedes	0	Collision	9	
Ret	10	(Japan) Kamui Kobayashi	Caterham-Renault	0	Brakes/Collision	14	
DSQ	3	(Australia) Daniel Ricciardo	Red Bull Racing-Renault	57	Illegal fuel meter^{2}	2	

Notes:

- ^1 — Jules Bianchi did not complete 90% of the race distance, and therefore is not classified as a finisher in the official results.
- ^2 — Daniel Ricciardo originally finished second, but was disqualified for breaching the maximum fuel limit and using an unauthorised method of measuring fuel consumption.

== Championship standings after the race ==
Drivers' Championship standings

Pos.	Driver	Points
1	(Germany) Nico Rosberg	25
2	(Denmark) Kevin Magnussen	18
3	(United Kingdom) Jenson Button	15
4	(Spain) Fernando Alonso	12
5	(Finland) Valtteri Bottas	10

Constructors' Championship standings

Pos.	Constructor	Points
1	(United Kingdom) McLaren-Mercedes	33
2	(Germany) Mercedes	25
3	(Italy) Ferrari	18
4	(United Kingdom) Williams-Mercedes	10
5	Force India-Mercedes	9

- Note: Only the top five positions are included for both sets of standings.

Previous race: 2013 Brazilian Grand Prix	FIA Formula One World Championship; 2014 season	Next race: 2014 Malaysian Grand Prix
Previous race: 2013 Australian Grand Prix	Australian Grand Prix	Next race: 2015 Australian Grand Prix
