= Marussia F1 =

Formula One racing team

Marussia
- Full name: Marussia F1 Team (2012–2014); Manor Marussia F1 Team (2015)
- Base: Banbury, Oxfordshire, United Kingdom (2012–2014); Dinnington, South Yorkshire, United Kingdom (2015)
- Noted staff: John Booth; Graeme Lowdon; John McQuilliam; Marc Hynes; Pat Symonds; Bob Bell; Nikolai Fomenko; Andrey Cheglakov; Andy Webb
- Noted drivers: (Germany) Timo Glock (France) Charles Pic (France) Jules Bianchi (United Kingdom) Max Chilton (United Kingdom) Will Stevens (Spain) Roberto Merhi (United States) Alexander Rossi
- Previous name: Marussia Virgin Racing
- Next name: Manor Racing

Formula One World Championship career
- First entry: 2012 Australian Grand Prix
- Races entered: 74 (73 starts)
- Engines: Cosworth, Ferrari
- Constructors' Championships: 0
- Drivers' Championships: 0
- Race victories: 0
- Points: 2
- Pole positions: 0
- Fastest laps: 0
- Final entry: 2015 Abu Dhabi Grand Prix

The Marussia F1 Team (subsequently Manor Marussia F1 Team) was a Formula One racing team and constructor which was based in Banbury, Oxfordshire and then later Dinnington, South Yorkshire in the United Kingdom and competed with a Russian licence from 2012 to 2014 and a British licence in 2015. The team was operated by Manor Motorsport (formerly Marussia Manor Racing), which was previously a subsidiary of Marussia Motors, a now defunct sports car manufacturer which was based in Moscow. The team originally started racing in 2010 under the "Virgin Racing" name; the following year Virgin adopted Marussia as a title sponsor becoming "Marussia Virgin Racing" until being fully rebranded as the "Marussia F1 Team" for 2012.

The Marussia team scored its first and only championship points at the 2014 Monaco Grand Prix, where its leading driver, Jules Bianchi, finished ninth, and in doing so Marussia became the first Russian-licensed constructor to score world championship points.

Following a serious crash and injuries sustained by Bianchi at the 2014 Japanese Grand Prix, which resulted in his death the following year, the team raced for the first time with a single car at the inaugural 2014 Russian Grand Prix. On 26 October 2014, news reports emerged that the Marussia team would not participate at the 2014 United States Grand Prix due to financial reasons and that, on 7 October 2014, the team filed a notice in the London High Court intending to go into administration. The appointed administrator released an official statement on 27 October 2014 and the team was still included in FIA's provisional entry list for the 2015 Formula One season but as the "Manor F1 Team". On 7 November 2014, however, the administrator announced that the team had ceased trading.

On 19 January 2015, the administrators of Marussia announced that the auction of its cars and assets had been cancelled so as to allow a possible buy-out to take place. The team collapsed owing around £60m, two of the companies out of pocket being Marussia's former competitors McLaren and Ferrari. The team exited administration on 19 February 2015, and was re-established as the Manor Marussia F1 Team after a CVA had been signed and new investment was secured to rescue the team. Former Sainsbury's CEO Justin King was reportedly the team's main backer. The team retained Marussia as its constructor name throughout the 2015 season, also adopting British nationality. In 2016, the team announced a name change to "Manor Racing". Manor lasted the 2016 season and used Mercedes-Benz power units.

== History ==
=== Background ===
The Manor Marussia logo used during the 2015 season

In 2009, Manor Grand Prix were awarded an entry into Formula One for the 2010 season, as a tie-up between successful junior racing team Manor Motorsport and Wirth Research. Before the end of that year, these entities became known as Virgin Racing, after Richard Branson's Virgin Group of companies who had bought the title sponsorship rights. Marussia were one of the team's partners for its debut season, where it finished in twelfth and last place in the Constructors' Championship. In November 2010, Marussia Motors purchased a controlling stake in the team, and the team became known as 'Marussia Virgin Racing' for the 2011 season. Following a disappointing start to the 2011 season, the team parted company with Wirth Research and entered a partnership with McLaren Applied Technologies ahead of the 2012 season. With this came a relocation from the original base in Dinnington, to the old Wirth premises in Banbury in Great Britain. Meanwhile, the team again finished the year bottom of the Constructors' Championship. In November 2011, it applied to the Formula One commission to formally change their constructor name for the 2012 season from Virgin to Marussia, to reflect their new ownership. Permission was granted before being formally ratified at a meeting of the FIA World Motor Sport Council.

=== 2012 season ===
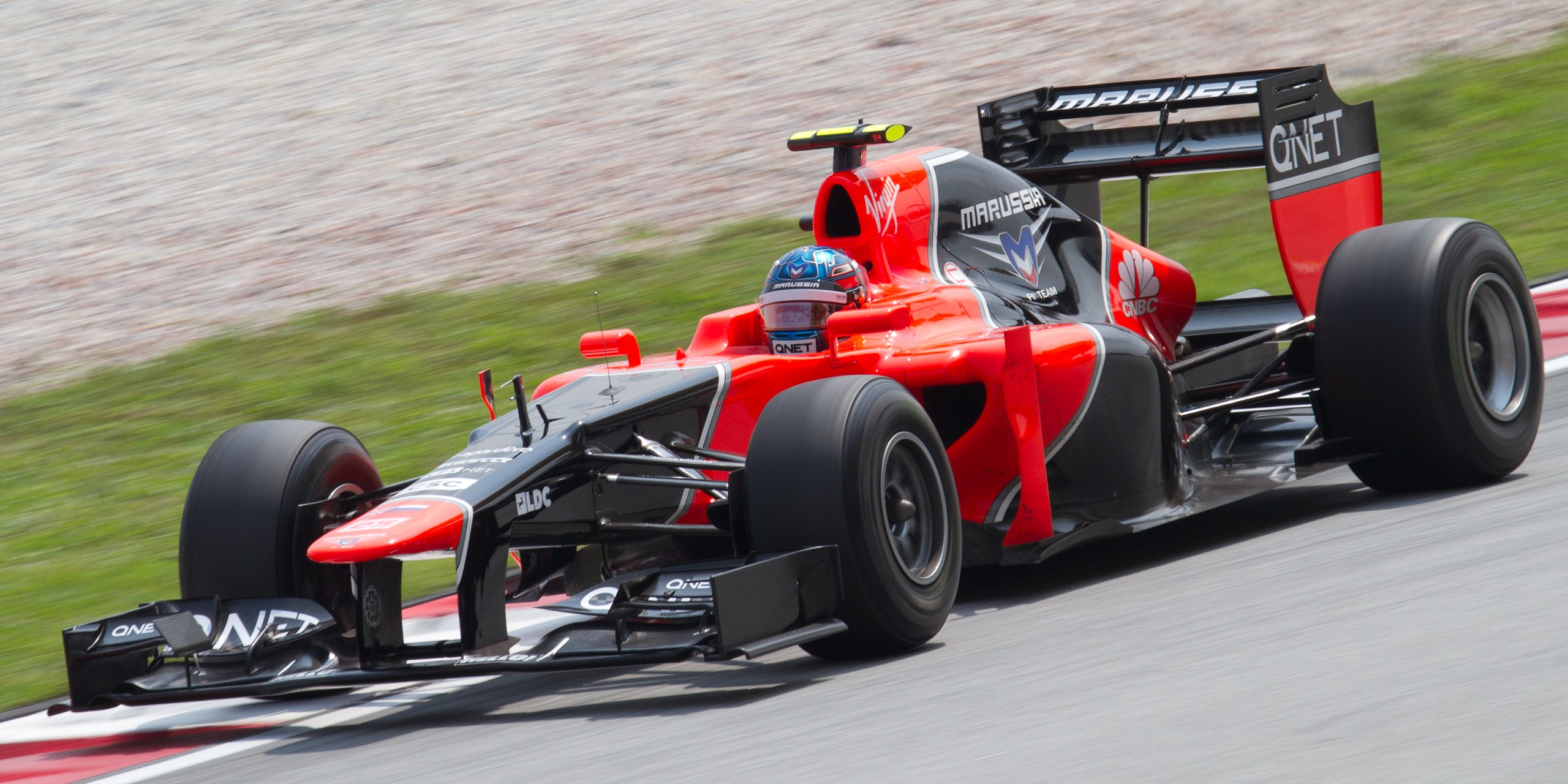
Charles Pic driving the Marussia MR01 at the 2012 Malaysian Grand Prix

On 31 December 2011, Marussia Virgin Racing announced they were now called Marussia F1 Team. Virgin, who had previously been the title sponsor for the team, announced that they would be staying with the team and feature its logos staying on the 2012 car. The team had announced in July 2011 that Timo Glock had signed a new three-year contract with the team. Glock would be joined for the 2012 season by GP2 Series graduate Charles Pic, who spent two days testing with the team at the Young Driver Test in Abu Dhabi.

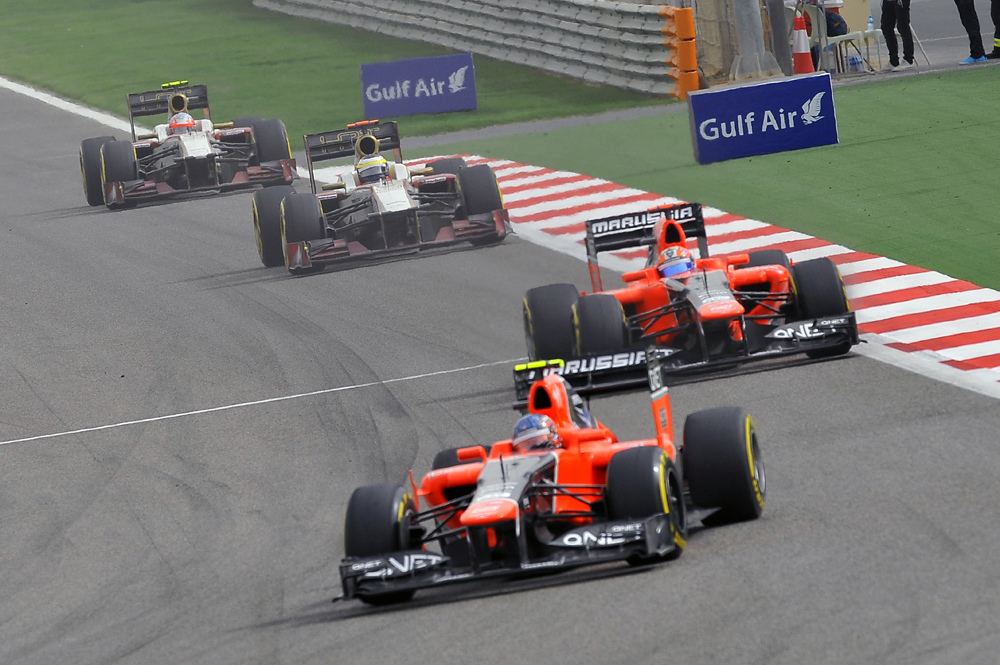
The Marussias of Charles Pic and Timo Glock leading the HRTs of Pedro de la Rosa and Narain Karthikeyan during the 2012 Bahrain Grand Prix

By 29 September 2011, Marussia already had a 60% scale model of their 2012 car ready for use in the McLaren wind tunnel. The team received its first parts for the car in December 2011. The team also announced that the 2012 car would be the only car on the grid not to have the new-to-F1, Kinetic Energy Recovery System (KERS). This status lasted only for one race weekend. Rival team HRT failed to qualify within the 107% time and were not allowed to race at the season opener in Australia. HRT decided that it was best to remove KERS from the car and focus on successfully qualifying.

Prior to the final testing session for the 2012 season at Barcelona, on 27 February the team announced via its website that the new MR01 car had failed the last of the mandatory 18 crash tests required of each car by the FIA. This meant the team would miss the final pre-season testing, instead choosing to concentrate on passing the remaining crash test in time for the first race of the year, the Australian Grand Prix.

On 5 March 2012, Marussia revealed the MR01 at Silverstone. The car design was led by technical consultant Pat Symonds and the team became the penultimate team to reveal its car for the 2012 season.

On 3 July 2012, test driver María de Villota was testing a car at Duxford Airfield, when she crashed heavily into the lift gate of the team transporter, and sustained serious injuries. She had been performing straight line aerodynamic tests in preparation for the British Grand Prix. On 4 July 2012, it was confirmed that de Villota lost her right eye as a result of the accident; a year later, she died as a result of the injuries. At Spa, the team's 50th Grand Prix as Virgin/Marussia, Charles Pic was fastest in free practice 2 with Timo Glock sixth. This became the highest ever result in an official Formula One session for the team in its history thanks, however, to the fact that only 10 drivers had set times in the session, due to heavy rain conditions. In Singapore, Timo Glock produced the then best ever race result for Marussia, finishing in 12th place; a result sufficient to elevate Marussia into 10th place in the Constructors' Championship, ahead of closest rivals, Caterham and HRT.

However, at the final race of the season in Brazil, Vitaly Petrov, racing for Caterham, finished the race in 11th place, thus reclaiming 10th place in the Constructors' Championship and the associated prize money for Caterham, demoting Marussia to 11th in the Championship.

=== 2013 season ===
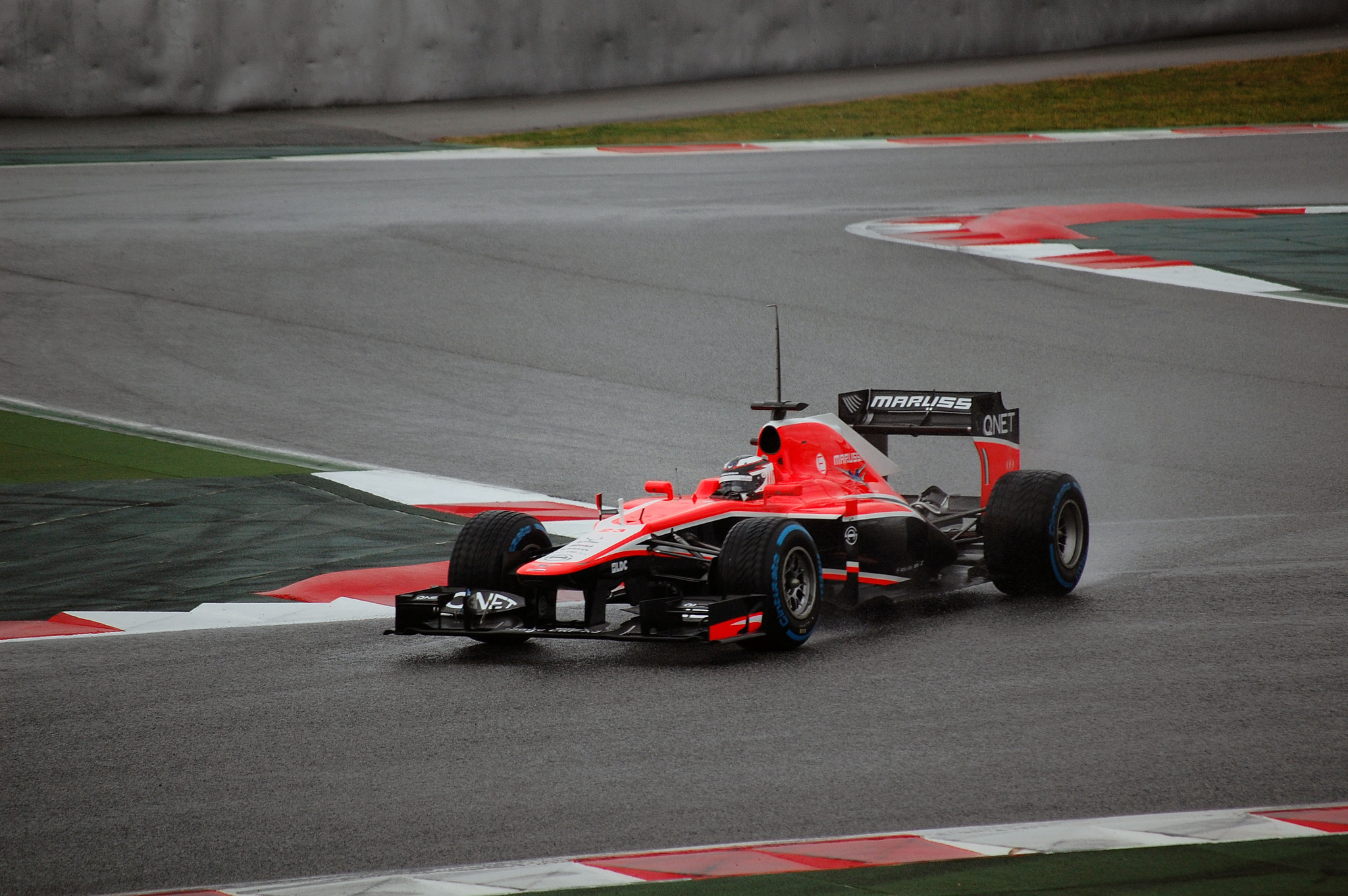
Max Chilton driving for Marussia during pre-season testing

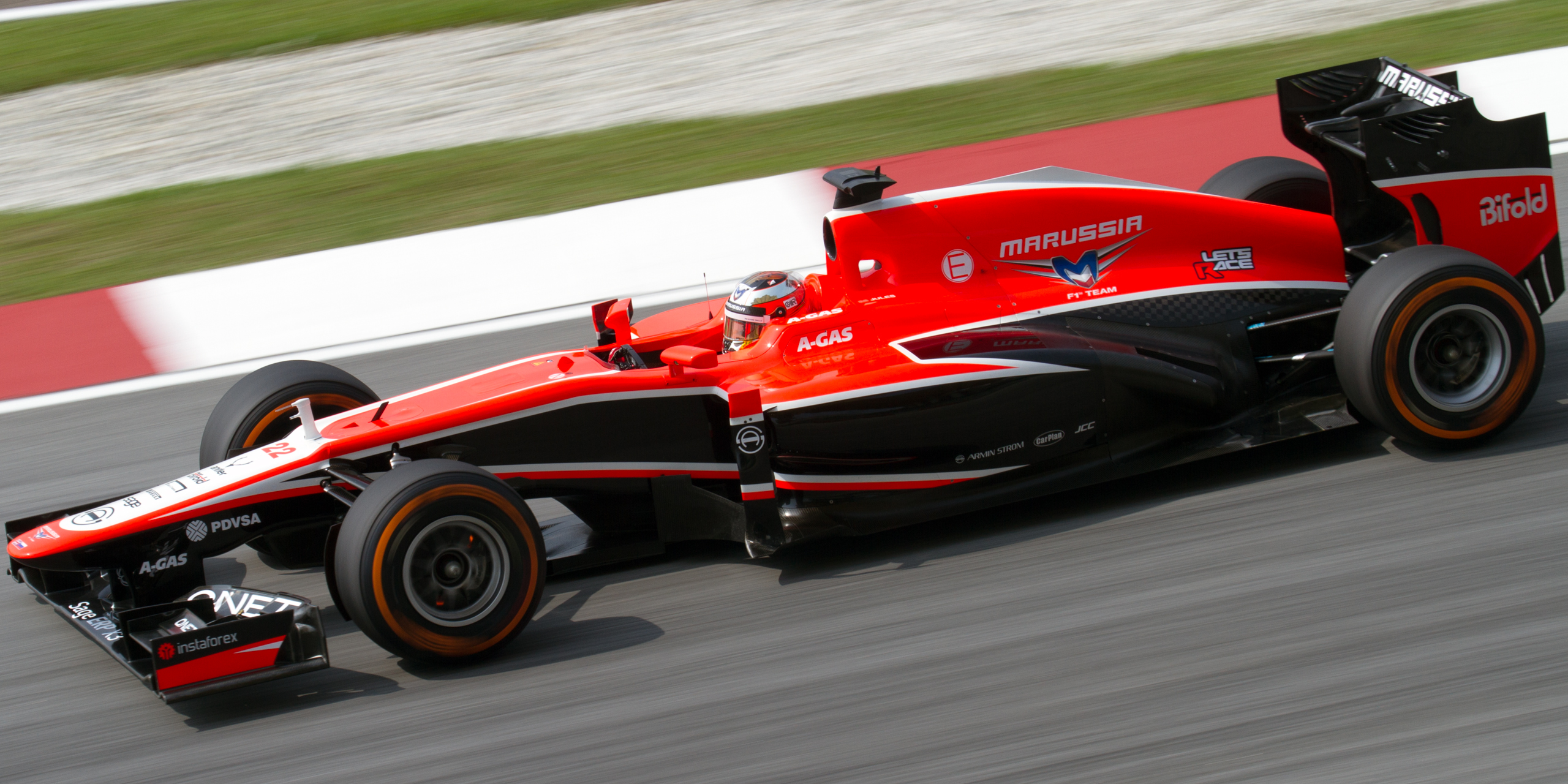
Jules Bianchi (1989–2015) driving the Marussia MR02 at the 2013 Malaysian Grand Prix

On 18 December 2012, Marussia announced that Max Chilton would make his Formula One debut in 2013 after securing the second race seat at the team, making him the fourth different driver in the history of the Marussia/Virgin team. Reportedly, Timo Glock left Marussia before the 2013 season for "commercial reasons". Luiz Razia also followed suit shortly after due to sponsorship difficulties, resulting in Ferrari Driver Academy driver, Jules Bianchi, making his Formula One driver début for the 2013 season. On 14 March 2013, Rodolfo González was appointed as the team's reserve driver. For the first race in Australia, both cars qualified ahead of rivals Caterham, while at the Malaysian Grand Prix, Bianchi finished the race in thirteenth position.

Throughout the year, Marussia and their nearest rivals Caterham remained at the back of the grid, usually qualifying on the back two rows. They fared better in racing, however, and whilst they failed to score any points, they demonstrated good reliability throughout the season. By the end of it, Marussia finished tenth in the Constructors' Championship, ahead of Caterham, earning them significant additional revenue for 2014. English driver Max Chilton became the first rookie driver ever to finish every race in a season.

=== 2014 season ===
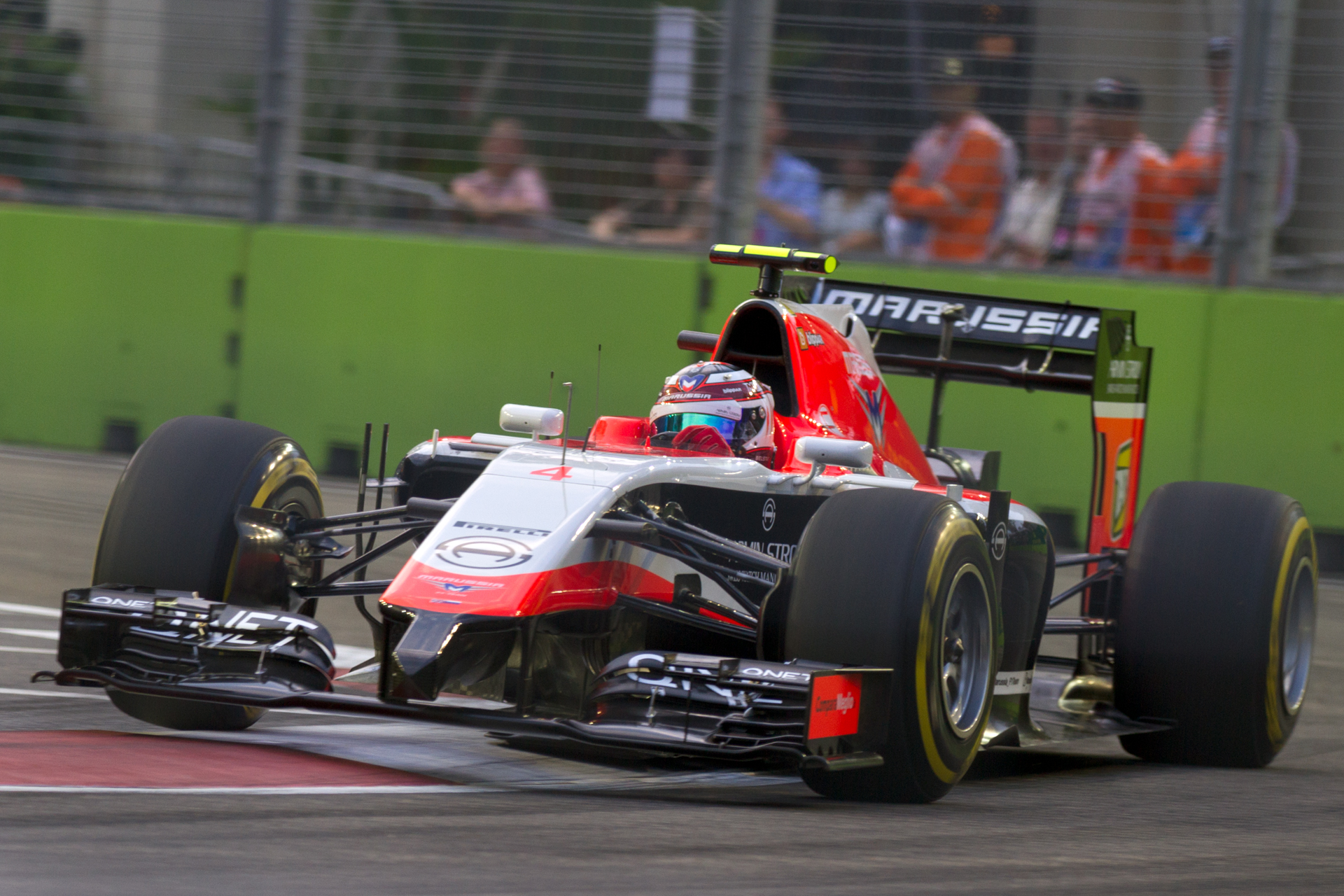
Max Chilton driving the MR03 at the 2014 Singapore Grand Prix

For 2014, Marussia decided to power its MR03 car with Ferrari engines. Cosworth elected not to build an engine for the new 2014 regulations. The team retained both Jules Bianchi and Max Chilton as its drivers.

At the Monaco Grand Prix, Bianchi scored his own and Marussia's first ever points by finishing ninth in an eventful race.

On 24 July, American rookie Alexander Rossi joined the team as a test and reserve driver from Caterham. On 21 August, it was announced he would be replacing Chilton for the Belgian Grand Prix while contractual issues were resolved. However, this decision was reversed the following morning during the free practice session.

During the Japanese Grand Prix at Suzuka on 5 October, Bianchi's car spun off on lap 43, colliding with a marshal's crane tractor that was attending to Adrian Sutil's Sauber car, which had also spun and crashed at the Dunlop curve (Turn 7) on the previous lap. The safety car was brought out and the race was subsequently red-flagged. Bianchi was reported as being unconscious after the crash, failing to respond to a radio call from his team and marshals that had gone to his rescue. Due to the precarious weather conditions at the time, he was taken to closest hospital, the Mie University hospital, by ambulance instead of helicopter. On the same day, Bianchi's father reported that his son was in a critical condition with a head injury requiring brain surgery in order to reduce severe bruising to his head. Soon after, the FIA released a statement that CT scans had shown Bianchi suffered a "severe head injury" in the crash, and he would be transferred to intensive care following surgery. A family update later, aside from acknowledging the widespread support, confirmed that Bianchi had suffered a diffuse axonal injury, which is a common traumatic brain injury in vehicle accidents involving high deceleration. Bianchi eventually succumbed to his injuries in July 2015.

At the inaugural Russian Grand Prix a weekend later, in place of the hospitalized Bianchi, the team originally registered Rossi in the participant list, before finally deciding to field a single car driven by Bianchi's teammate, Max Chilton. In addition, at the same venue, Marussia raced its MR03 car with "#JB17" livery, after Bianchi's initials and race number, to further honour and support their injured driver. Aside from providing updates on their seriously injured driver's medical condition in conjunction with the Bianchi family, a fortnight after the Suzuka accident, the Marussia team also went on public record to condemn various media reports that have been making speculative assertions about the team's direct role in that accident.

On 25 October, it was announced that, along with Caterham, Marussia would be unable to compete at the United States Grand Prix due to financial reasons. As transport of Formula One team equipment between the USA and Brazil for return to Europe is coordinated together, Marussia also missed the following weekend's Brazilian Grand Prix. Around the same time, further media reports revealed that, Formula One teams have agreed to teams in difficulty to miss out up to two races per season and that, on 7 October 2014, Marussia Manor Racing filed a notice in the London High Court intending to assign an administrator. An official statement by the appointed administrator was released on 27 October 2014. In the same week, the team's main financial backer, Andrey Cheglakov, confirmed to Russian news agency ITAR-TASS that he had withdrawn from the team. In addition, British media reported that British-Indian steel industry brothers Baljinder Sohi and Sonny Kaushal were potential buyers for the team.

At the United States Grand Prix, although in breach of Formula One regulations by not being present at that race weekend, the FIA stewards decided to not impose any penalties, in consequence of the team's current financial circumstances, similar to those of the also missing Caterham F1 team. Instead, they referred the matter to the attention of the FIA president.

On 5 November 2014, the FIA included the team in the provisional entry list for the 2015 Formula One season but as the "Manor F1 Team". Two days later, however, the administrator announced that the team had ceased trading and folded, without further entry to F1 making 200 staff members redundant. Notwithstanding this, coinciding with the Brazilian Grand Prix weekend, the former team CEO, Graeme Lowdon, remained adamant of the possibility that Marussia could return for the season finale in Abu Dhabi, with a view of also securing its entry in 2015.

Despite this optimism, Marussia failed to appear at the last three races of the season, with its assets sold at auction in mid-December 2014. With the aim of facilitating the entry of his F1 team in 2016, it is reported that Gene Haas purchased Marussia's Banbury base as well as data and designs for the 2015 car, which was already well developed with a scale wind-tunnel model.

After the death of Bianchi, the team's former backer, Andrey Cheglakov, revealed that the events at the 2014 Japanese Grand Prix were a key factor in his decision to quit his financial support of the team.

=== 2015 season ===
On 19 February 2015, Manor Motorsport's administrators announced that the team had come out of administration and planned to enter the 2015 Formula One season under the name Manor Marussia F1 Team with John Booth and Graeme Lowdon continuing to run the team. This was possible thanks to businessman Stephen Fitzpatrick buying the team, with Justin King joining as chairman.

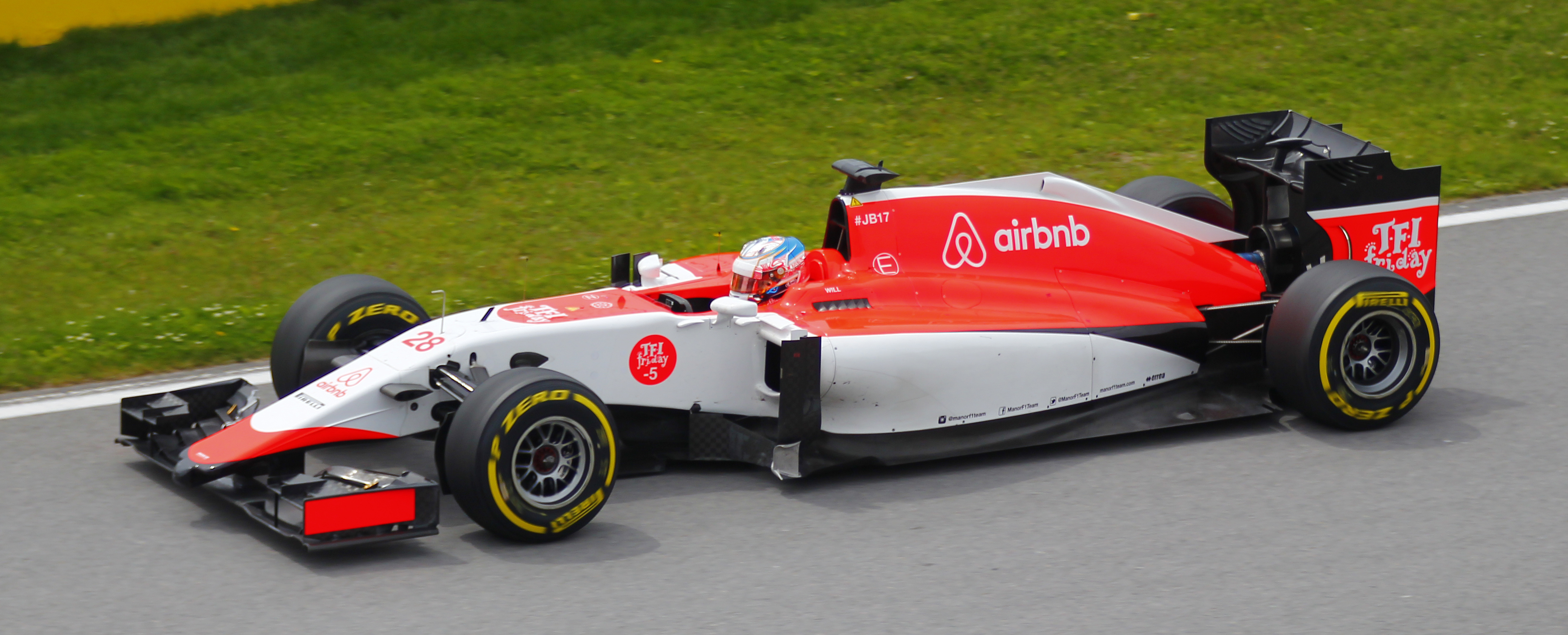
Will Stevens driving the MR03B during the Canadian GP race weekend

On 5 February 2015, however, the team's request to compete in the 2015 season using their 2014 chassis was declined by the other Formula One entrants, after Force India voted against the proposal. This report was refuted by the team the following day. Manor ultimately started the season with a modified version of their 2014 car, updated to meet 2015 regulations, and expect to have a new car built specifically for the 2015 regulations ready by the August break. On 25 February 2015, Will Stevens was confirmed as Manor's first driver. On 9 March, it was also announced that Roberto Merhi would be Manor's second driver with Jordan King – son of the new chairman – also joining as the development driver.

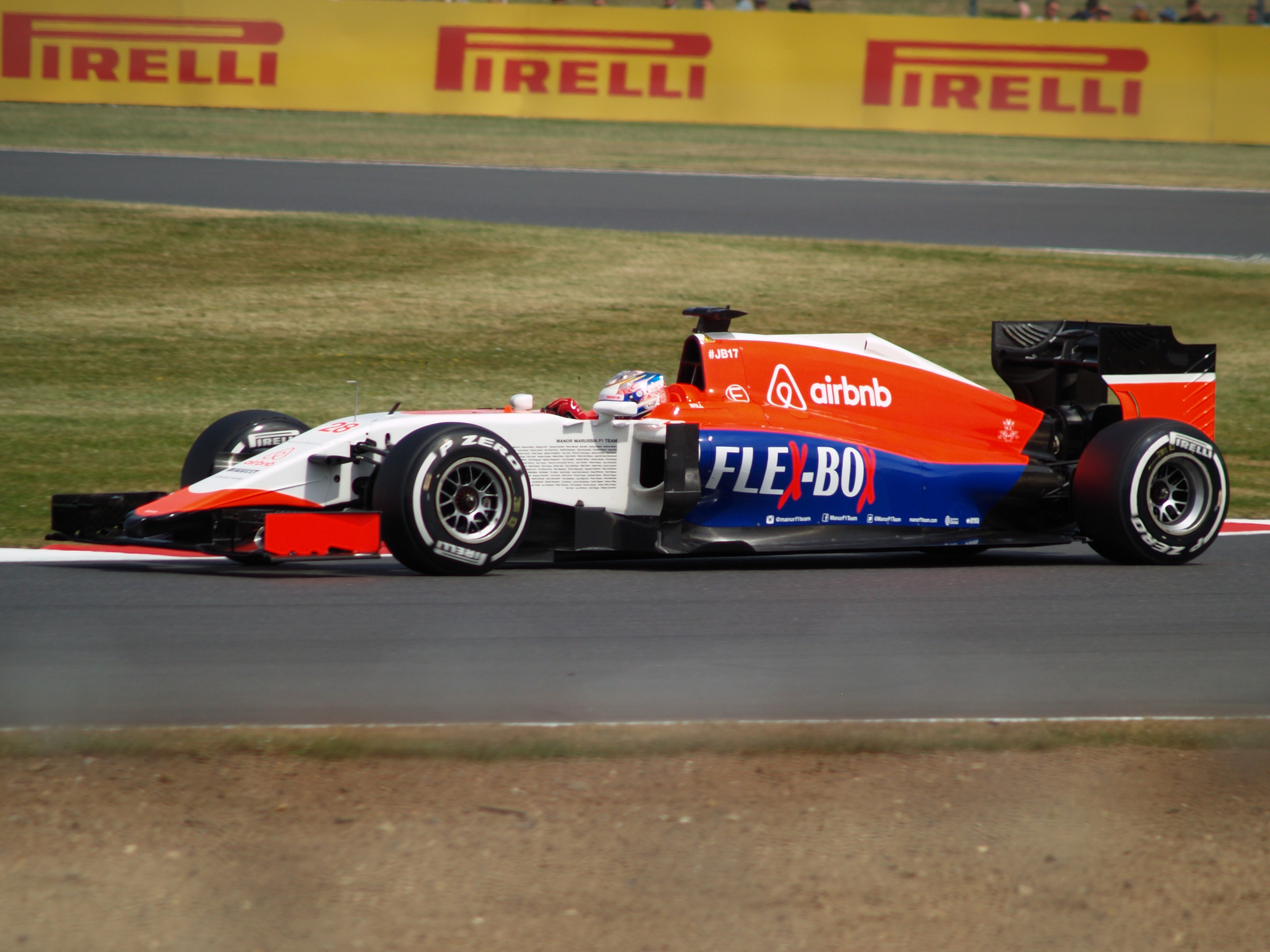
Will Stevens racing during the 2015 British Grand Prix

On 5 March 2015, the team completed mandatory crash testing and were cleared to take their place on the starting grid at the Australian Grand Prix, just in time for the air freight deadline on 6 March. Despite this, neither car completed a single lap due to technical difficulties and sat out the entire event.

At the following Malaysian Grand Prix, both drivers failed to qualify for the race, but received permission from the stewards to start. However, Stevens was unable to leave his garage on race day due to a fuel system problem on his car. Merhi finished his first race in 15th position. A short-lived controversy ensued after the race thanks to claims made by Force India's deputy team principal, Bob Fernley, that Manor Marussia had a clear strategy to run just one car in Malaysia. These claims were dismissed by Manor.

Prior to the Canadian Grand Prix, the team announced the recruitment of Fabio Leimer as reserve driver and, more crucially, of former Mercedes F1 team technical director, Bob Bell, as technical consultant. The latter followed a series of other key recruitments in May 2015, including those of Gianluca Pisanello, formerly of Caterham F1 as chief engineer, and former Toro Rosso chief designer, Luca Furbatto, as head of design. Also in time for the Canadian Grand Prix, the team announced their partnership with Airbnb and with shipping and storage container manufacturer and supplier, Flex-Box, at the British Grand Prix, with both sponsors' logos featuring for the duration of the 2015 season. In addition to new livery, the MR03B race car also received its first updates at the latter Grand Prix.

Starting in Singapore, Alexander Rossi replaced Merhi for five of the remaining seven Grands Prix of 2015; Merhi raced in Russia and in the season finale in Abu Dhabi.

Ahead of the Mexican Grand Prix, the team announced that their team bosses John Booth and Graeme Lowdon had resigned, effective at the end of 2015, citing differences with team owner Stephen Fitzpatrick.

After the 2015 season, Manor Marussia, officially changed their name to Manor Racing.

== Complete Formula One results ==
(key) (results in bold indicate pole position; races in italics indicate fastest lap)

Year	Chassis	Engine	Tyres	Drivers	1	2	3	4	5	6	7	8	9	10	11	12	13	14	15	16	17	18	19	20	Points	WCC
2012	MR01	Cosworth CA2012 2.4 V8	P		AUS	MAL	CHN	BHR	ESP	MON	CAN	EUR	GBR	GER	HUN	BEL	ITA	SIN	JPN	KOR	IND	ABU	USA	BRA	0	11th
2012	MR01	Cosworth CA2012 2.4 V8	P	(Germany) Timo Glock	14	17	19	19	18	14	Ret	DNS	18	22	21	15	17	12	16	18	20	14	19	16	0	11th
2012	MR01	Cosworth CA2012 2.4 V8	P	(France) Charles Pic	15^{†}	20	20	Ret	Ret	Ret	20	15	19	20	20	16	16	16	Ret	19	19	Ret	20	12	0	11th
2013	MR02	Cosworth CA2013 2.4 V8	P		AUS	MAL	CHN	BHR	ESP	MON	CAN	GBR	GER	HUN	BEL	ITA	SIN	KOR	JPN	IND	ABU	USA	BRA		0	10th
2013	MR02	Cosworth CA2013 2.4 V8	P	(France) Jules Bianchi	15	13	15	19	18	Ret	17	16	Ret	16	18	19	18	16	Ret	18	20	18	17		0	10th
2013	MR02	Cosworth CA2013 2.4 V8	P	(United Kingdom) Max Chilton	17	16	17	20	19	14	19	17	19	17	19	20	17	17	19	17	21	21	19		0	10th
2014	MR03	Ferrari 059/3 1.6 V6 t	P		AUS	MAL	BHR	CHN	ESP	MON	CAN	AUT	GBR	GER	HUN	BEL	ITA	SIN	JPN	RUS	USA	BRA	ABU		2	9th
2014	MR03	Ferrari 059/3 1.6 V6 t	P	(United Kingdom) Max Chilton	13	15	13	19	19	14	Ret	17	16	17	16	16	Ret	17	18	Ret					2	9th
2014	MR03	Ferrari 059/3 1.6 V6 t	P	(France) Jules Bianchi	NC	Ret	16	17	18	9	Ret	15	14	15	15	18^{†}	18	16	20^{†}						2	9th
2014	MR03	Ferrari 059/3 1.6 V6 t	P	(United States) Alexander Rossi												PO				WD					2	9th
2015	MR03B	Ferrari 059/3 1.6 V6 t	P		AUS	MAL	CHN	BHR	ESP	MON	CAN	AUT	GBR	HUN	BEL	ITA	SIN	JPN	RUS	USA	MEX	BRA	ABU		0	10th
2015	MR03B	Ferrari 059/3 1.6 V6 t	P	(United Kingdom) Will Stevens	DNP	DNS	15	16	17	17	17	Ret	13	16^{†}	16	15	15	19	14	Ret	16	17	18		0	10th
2015	MR03B	Ferrari 059/3 1.6 V6 t	P	(Spain) Roberto Merhi	DNP	15	16	17	18	16	Ret	14	12	15	15	16			13				19		0	10th
2015	MR03B	Ferrari 059/3 1.6 V6 t	P	(United States) Alexander Rossi													14	18		12	15	18			0	10th

^{†} Drivers did not finish the race, but were classified as they had completed greater than 90% of the race winner's distance.
