= 2013 Australian Grand Prix =

Formula One race

Race 1 of 19 in the 2013 Formula One World Championship
← Previous race	Next race →

Race details
- Date: 17 March 2013
- Official name: 2013 Formula 1 Rolex Australian Grand Prix
- Location: Melbourne Grand Prix Circuit, Melbourne, Australia
- Course: Temporary street circuit
- Course length: 5.303 km (3.295 miles)
- Distance: 58 laps, 307.574 km (191.118 miles)
- Weather: Scattered Clouds, Fine and Dry Air Temp 18 °C (64 °F) Track Temp 25 °C (77 °F) dropping to 19 °C (66 °F)
- Attendance: 103,000

Pole position
Driver	(Germany) Sebastian Vettel	Red Bull-Renault
- Time: 1:27.407

Fastest lap
Driver	(Finland) Kimi Räikkönen	Lotus-Renault
- Time: 1:29.274 on lap 56

Podium
First	(Finland) Kimi Räikkönen	Lotus-Renault
Second	(Spain) Fernando Alonso	Ferrari
Third	(Germany) Sebastian Vettel	Red Bull-Renault

The 2013 Australian Grand Prix (formally known as the 2013 Formula 1 Rolex Australian Grand Prix) was a Formula One motor race that was held on 17 March 2013 as the opening round of the 2013 World Championship. The race was held at the Melbourne Grand Prix Circuit in the Melbourne suburb of Albert Park. It was the 78th race in the combined history of the Australian Grand Prix – which dates back to the 100 Miles Road Race of 1928 – and the 18th time the event has been held at the Melbourne Grand Prix Circuit. The race was won by Kimi Räikkönen with Fernando Alonso coming second and Sebastian Vettel coming third.

This was the last time a Formula One race was won by a driver from a team other than Mercedes, Ferrari or Red Bull, until Pierre Gasly won the 2020 Italian Grand Prix driving for Scuderia AlphaTauri, 147 races later.

It was also Lotus's last win, Kimi Räikkönen's last race victory until the 2018 United States Grand Prix, and also the last win for a Finnish driver until Valtteri Bottas, who made his debut in this race, won the 2017 Russian Grand Prix. The result also meant that it was the last time that Räikkönen occupied the lead in the Drivers' Championship until his retirement in 2021.

== Report ==
=== Background ===
Following the collapse of HRT F1 in December 2012, the grid for the season was reduced to twenty-two entries, necessitating changes to the structure of qualifying. The three-round knockout system introduced in 2006 remained in place, but only six cars, instead of seven, were eliminated during the first period of qualifying, with six more eliminated at the end of the second period. The third qualifying period remains unchanged with the ten fastest drivers all advancing to the final ten minutes of qualifying.

During the winter off-season, the Fédération Internationale de l'Automobile introduced new rules restricting the use of the Drag Reduction System during free practice and qualifying, limiting its use to the circuit's designated DRS zones. However, during Friday practice, the race stewards encountered a technical glitch in the telemetry system that controlled the availability of DRS, meaning that the system would be completely unrestricted. This forced the stewards to rely on drivers to use the system honestly, threatening penalties to any driver caught using DRS outside the designated areas. The same error meant that the stewards would be unable to notify drivers via telemetry of warning flags, instead relying on marshalls around the circuit to display them and teams to warn drivers up upcoming flags during the race.

Tyre supplier Pirelli provided teams with the super-soft and medium compound tyres for the race, compared to the soft and medium selection offered in 2012.

=== Qualifying ===
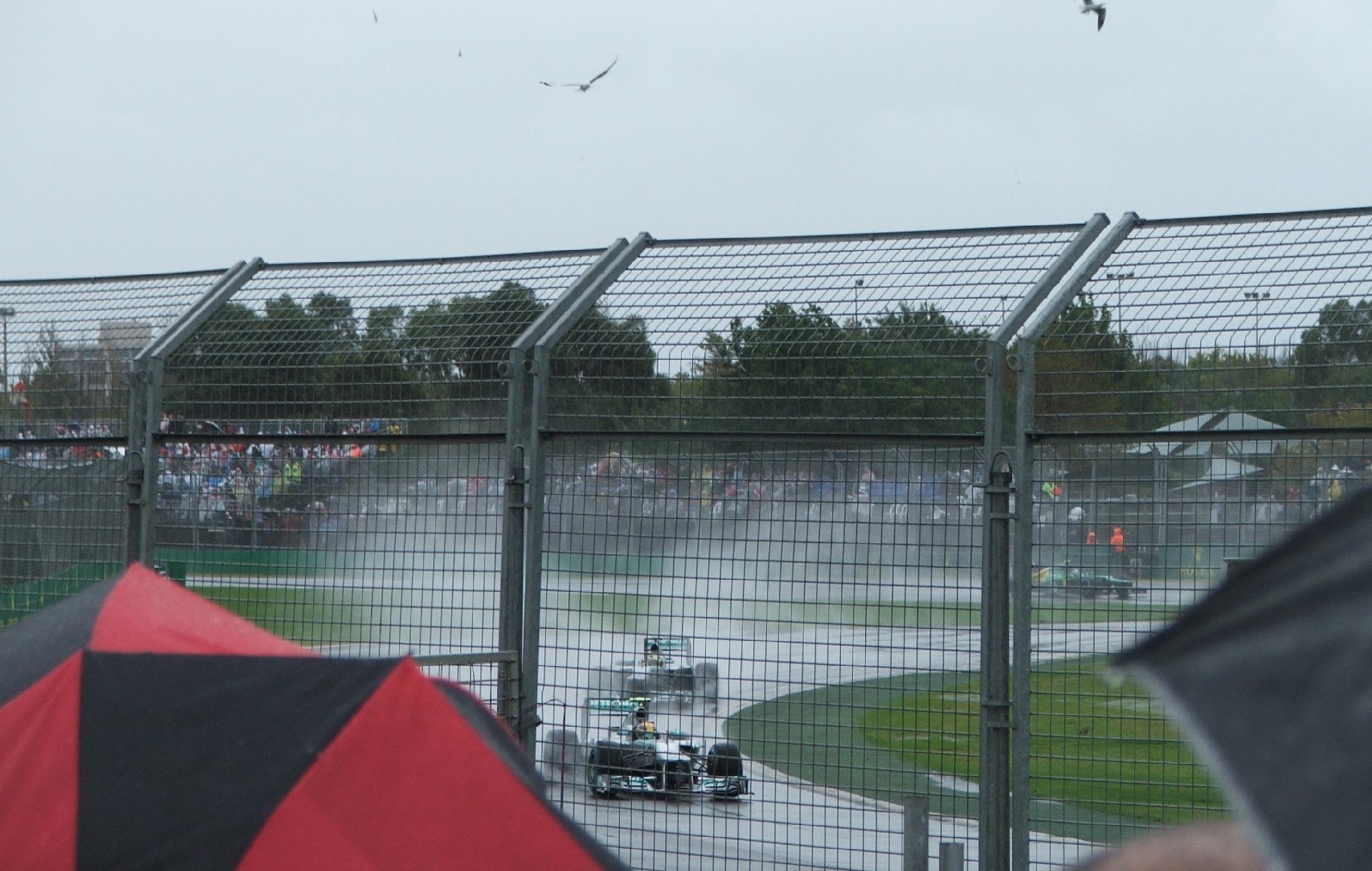
New Mercedes teammates, Hamilton and Rosberg, negotiating turn 2 during a waterlogged qualifying session.

==== Q1 ====
Prior to the first qualifying session of the season, Melbourne had experienced a record heatwave and no rain for almost the entire month of March. These dry conditions, however, did not prevail with precipitation occurring over free practice, turning into heavy rainfalls just before qualifying. After an initial thirty-minute postponement from the official 17:00 (local time) start, the first session of qualifying eventually started and was held in wet conditions with all drivers on wet tyres. Conditions were tricky, resulting in some drivers taking off-field excursions. Lewis Hamilton lost control of his car during turn 2 and slid into the wall. He was able to reverse back onto the circuit and continue, albeit with minor damage to his rear wing. Felipe Massa also spun into the wall after turn 14, escaping with only a broken front wing. As the track dried out, however, drivers switched to intermediate tyres and lap times began dropping for over the remainder of the session. Esteban Gutiérrez spun at the same place as Massa had previously, stalling the engine. The incident ended his qualifying session and prejudiced the lap times of others drivers.

At the end of Q1, six drivers were eliminated. Pastor Maldonado qualified seventeenth after going off the circuit, whilst Gutiérrez's crash meant that the Mexican was unable to continue and was subsequently eliminated in eighteenth place. Marussia's Jules Bianchi (on his Formula One debut) and Max Chilton qualified nineteenth and twentieth respectively, ahead of the Caterhams of Giedo van der Garde and Charles Pic. The latter failed to set a lap time within 107% of the fastest time, set by Nico Rosberg, meaning his participation in the race depended on dispensation from the race stewards.

==== Q2 ====
With debris from several accidents during Q1 scattered across the track, the break between Q1 and Q2 was extended to allow marshalls to clean up. Over this period, however, rain intensified forcing a postponement of the session. Marshalls resorted to brooms in a bid to remove puddles forming on the poorly drained public road surface. With qualifying and the race being run late in the afternoon to accommodate European television audiences, twilight approached and the stewards tried to schedule a restart at 18:30 and then finally 18:50. The rain continued, albeit very lightly, and stewards ultimately chose to suspend qualifying. The final two sessions (Q2 and Q3) were thus rescheduled for Sunday morning.

The Q2 session was scheduled to begin at 11:00 (local time) while the weather was cool and cloudy with an air temperature of only 15 °C (59 °F). The track remained damp from overnight rain and was also cool 13 °C (55 °F); humidity was hovering around 63%. In the end, it was Nico Hülkenberg, Adrian Sutil, Jean-Éric Vergne, Daniel Ricciardo, Sergio Pérez and Valtteri Bottas who failed to make it through to Q3.

==== Q3 ====
The Red Bulls locked out the front row with Sebastian Vettel on pole and Mark Webber on second.

=== Race ===
The race began at 17:00 local time, with Nico Hülkenberg unable to take part in the race due to worries over a fuel feed problem in his Sauber C32. Sebastian Vettel got a perfect start from pole and went into the first corner unchallenged, but the same could not be said of teammate Mark Webber who started alongside him, as a problem with an ECU meant that he could not use his KERS off the start line and he ended up dropping down to seventh. The chief beneficiaries of this were the Ferraris, with Felipe Massa moving from fourth to second and Alonso to third after overtaking Lewis Hamilton around the outside of Turn 3. Kimi Räikkönen moved up to fifth ahead of Nico Rosberg and Webber and on the second lap took fourth from Hamilton by passing him at Turn 11. His Lotus teammate Romain Grosjean went backwards from eighth to eleventh, losing places to Paul di Resta, Jenson Button and Adrian Sutil.

All the jostling behind Vettel helped him to gain a two-second lead by the end of the first lap. That was soon erased out by Massa and Alonso who rapidly caught up. Jenson Button made his first pit stop to switch from the super-softs to the medium tyres after just four laps and was followed by many others. Webber lost even further time and places during this period with a slow pitstop due to an issue with his jacks. The leaders elected to stay longer than the others, Vettel waiting for seven laps before pitting, Massa eight and Alonso and Räikkönen two laps further. The quartet rejoined in the same order, but more spread out due to Vettel and Massa gaining an extra lap on the new set of tyres. Hamilton and Rosberg, having realized that they did not have the pace of those in front, ran till lap 13 and 14 respectively in order to attempt a two-stop strategy.

This left Sutil and Sergio Pérez, two of the drivers who elected to start the race on mediums out in front ahead of Vettel, Massa, Alonso and Räikkönen. Pérez was unable to make the mediums last and was quickly dispatched by the quartet on fresher mediums. Sutil was a totally different prospect. Vettel was unable to pass him despite having closed rapidly and this soon helped bring Massa and Alonso back on to his tail. Neither of them were able to make any direct impression. Räikkönen began to rapidly close in as well. Neither Webber nor Grosjean had got out of the midfield after their poor starts, with the former in ninth and the latter in eleventh.

On lap 20, Alonso decided to make an early second pitstop for new tyres. Sutil and Vettel came in a lap later, but the lap on fresh tyres was enough for the Spanish driver to jump both Germans. Massa stayed out for too long and dropped to the back of the group. Räikkönen, Hamilton and Rosberg now held the top three places, all three of them attempting two-stop strategies. Alonso was fourth, Vettel fifth having passed Sutil and Massa dropped to seventh. The two Mercedes started to experience a drop-off in their lap times but Räikkönen was still able to drive at a consistent speed despite having pitted for the tyres four laps before the Mercedes drivers. The tyre issue became academic for Rosberg when he retired close to half-distance with an electrical failure. Hamilton was now vulnerable to the drivers with newer tyres. Alonso attacked and passed Hamilton on lap 32 despite his best efforts to defend. The Briton flatspotted his tyre and had to pit immediately and rejoined in sixth place just ahead of di Resta and Webber.

With a clear track in front of him, Alonso now started to rapidly close in on Räikkönen's 16 second lead. The Finn responded by making his second pitstop on lap 34, rejoining in fifth. During this stint, Alonso was able to drop Vettel and build a five-second gap over the German driver, who in turn was building a similar gap to Sutil. Massa, like Vettel earlier, was held up behind Sutil unable to pass despite having a faster car. The frustrated Brazilian made his final pit stop early as a result on lap 36. Vettel followed suit to cover him next lap, whereas Alonso, now having the cushion of a gap was able to wait until lap 39. On the same lap, after releasing Button from 11th place, Daniel Ricciardo was forced to retire with a broken exhaust. Sutil now led from Räikkönen and Alonso but could do little to keep them behind with older tyres. Räikkönen took full advantage when Alonso got held up behind Sutil as the Finn had a seven-second gap to the Spaniard. Hamilton decided that a two-stop strategy was not going to work once Vettel and Massa passed him. He made a third stop for fresh tyres, again rejoining in front of di Resta and Webber.

When Sutil made his final pitstop on lap 46 while running third, he had to switch to the super-soft tyres as he had started on the mediums unlike the leaders. He rejoined fifth, but quickly found out that the super-softs wore out rapidly. Sutil was defenseless when first Hamilton and then a recovering Webber attacked him on lap 51. Despite the newer tyres, neither Alonso nor Vettel were able to make an impression on leader Räikkönen. Räikkönen hammered the point home by setting the fastest lap of the race on lap 56, which was the 23rd lap on the same set of tyres. Alonso backed off and settled for second after almost crashing into the back of Charles Pic while lapping the Caterham driver.

Räikkönen won from Alonso and Vettel completed the podium. Massa was fourth after having to back off in the latter stages to conserve his tyres. Hamilton fifth ahead of Webber. Sutil, despite the badly worn super-softs, still held on for seventh ahead of his teammate di Resta. The battle for ninth was ultimately won by Button, with Grosjean taking the final point, holding off Pérez and Jean-Éric Vergne. Esteban Gutiérrez was the best placed rookie in 13th, one place ahead of Valtteri Bottas. Jules Bianchi was 15th, comfortably ahead of his teammate and the two Caterhams. Ferrari took the lead in the Constructor's Championship, with Lotus-Renault second and Red Bull-Renault third.

The win was the twentieth of Räikkönen's career, tying him with Finnish compatriot Mika Häkkinen. It was also his last until the 2018 United States Grand Prix.

== Classification ==
=== Qualifying ===
Pos.	No.	Driver	Constructor	Q1	Q2	Q3	Grid
1	1	(Germany) Sebastian Vettel	Red Bull-Renault	1:44.657	1:36.745	1:27.407	1
2	2	(Australia) Mark Webber	Red Bull-Renault	1:44.472	1:36.524	1:27.827	2
3	10	(United Kingdom) Lewis Hamilton	Mercedes	1:45.456	1:36.625	1:28.087	3
4	4	(Brazil) Felipe Massa	Ferrari	1:44.635	1:36.666	1:28.490	4
5	3	(Spain) Fernando Alonso	Ferrari	1:43.850	1:36.691	1:28.493	5
6	9	(Germany) Nico Rosberg	Mercedes	1:43.380	1:36.194	1:28.523	6
7	7	(Finland) Kimi Räikkönen	Lotus-Renault	1:45.545	1:37.517	1:28.738	7
8	8	(France) Romain Grosjean	Lotus-Renault	1:44.284	1:37.641	1:29.013	8
9	14	(United Kingdom) Paul di Resta	Force India-Mercedes	1:45.601	1:36.901	1:29.305	9
10	5	(United Kingdom) Jenson Button	McLaren-Mercedes	1:44.688	1:36.644	1:30.357	10
11	11	(Germany) Nico Hülkenberg	Sauber-Ferrari	1:45.930	1:38.067		11
12	15	(Germany) Adrian Sutil	Force India-Mercedes	1:47.330	1:38.134		12
13	18	(France) Jean-Éric Vergne	Toro Rosso-Ferrari	1:44.871	1:38.778		13
14	19	(Australia) Daniel Ricciardo	Toro Rosso-Ferrari	1:46.450	1:39.042		14
15	6	(Mexico) Sergio Pérez	McLaren-Mercedes	1:44.400	1:39.900		15
16	17	(Finland) Valtteri Bottas	Williams-Renault	1:47.328	1:40.290		16
17	16	(Venezuela) Pastor Maldonado	Williams-Renault	1:47.614			17
18	12	(Mexico) Esteban Gutiérrez	Sauber-Ferrari	1:47.776			18
19	22	(France) Jules Bianchi	Marussia-Cosworth	1:48.147			19
20	23	(United Kingdom) Max Chilton	Marussia-Cosworth	1:48.909			20
21	21	(Netherlands) Giedo van der Garde	Caterham-Renault	1:49.519			21
107% time: 1:50.616
22	20	(France) Charles Pic	Caterham-Renault	1:50.626			22^{1}

Notes

- ^1 — Charles Pic failed to set a time within 107% of the fastest time in the session, but was allowed to start by the race stewards.

=== Race ===
Pos.	No.	Driver	Constructor	Laps	Time/Retired	Grid	Points
1	7	(Finland) Kimi Räikkönen	Lotus-Renault	58	1:30:03.225	7	25
2	3	(Spain) Fernando Alonso	Ferrari	58	+12.451	5	18
3	1	(Germany) Sebastian Vettel	Red Bull-Renault	58	+22.346	1	15
4	4	(Brazil) Felipe Massa	Ferrari	58	+33.577	4	12
5	10	(United Kingdom) Lewis Hamilton	Mercedes	58	+45.561	3	10
6	2	(Australia) Mark Webber	Red Bull-Renault	58	+46.800	2	8
7	15	(Germany) Adrian Sutil	Force India-Mercedes	58	+1:05.068	12	6
8	14	(United Kingdom) Paul di Resta	Force India-Mercedes	58	+1:08.449	9	4
9	5	(United Kingdom) Jenson Button	McLaren-Mercedes	58	+1:21.630	10	2
10	8	(France) Romain Grosjean	Lotus-Renault	58	+1:22.759	8	1
11	6	(Mexico) Sergio Pérez	McLaren-Mercedes	58	+1:23.367	15	
12	18	(France) Jean-Éric Vergne	Toro Rosso-Ferrari	58	+1:23.857	13	
13	12	(Mexico) Esteban Gutiérrez	Sauber-Ferrari	57	+1 lap	18	
14	17	(Finland) Valtteri Bottas	Williams-Renault	57	+1 lap	16	
15	22	(France) Jules Bianchi	Marussia-Cosworth	57	+1 lap	19	
16	20	(France) Charles Pic	Caterham-Renault	56	+2 laps	22	
17	23	(United Kingdom) Max Chilton	Marussia-Cosworth	56	+2 laps	20	
18	21	(Netherlands) Giedo van der Garde	Caterham-Renault	56	+2 laps	21	
Ret	19	(Australia) Daniel Ricciardo	Toro Rosso-Ferrari	39	Exhaust	14	
Ret	9	(Germany) Nico Rosberg	Mercedes	26	Electrical	6	
Ret	16	(Venezuela) Pastor Maldonado	Williams-Renault	24	Spun off	17	
DNS	11	(Germany) Nico Hülkenberg	Sauber-Ferrari	0	Fuel system	11	

== Championship standings after the race ==
Drivers' Championship standings

Pos.	Driver	Points
1	(Finland) Kimi Räikkönen	25
2	(Spain) Fernando Alonso	18
3	(Germany) Sebastian Vettel	15
4	(Brazil) Felipe Massa	12
5	(United Kingdom) Lewis Hamilton	10

Constructors' Championship standings

Pos.	Constructor	Points
1	(Italy) Ferrari	30
2	(United Kingdom) Lotus-Renault	26
3	(Austria) Red Bull-Renault	23
4	(Germany) Mercedes	10
5	Force India-Mercedes	10

- Note: Only the top five positions are included for both sets of standings.

== See also ==
- 2013 MSS Security V8 Supercars Challenge

Previous race: 2012 Brazilian Grand Prix	FIA Formula One World Championship; 2013 season	Next race: 2013 Malaysian Grand Prix
Previous race: 2012 Australian Grand Prix	Australian Grand Prix	Next race: 2014 Australian Grand Prix
