= 2013 Spanish Grand Prix =

Race 5 of 19 in the 2013 Formula One World Championship
← Previous race	Next race →
- Circuit de Catalunya

Race details
- Date: 12 May 2013
- Official name: Formula 1 Gran Premio de España 2013
- Location: Circuit de Catalunya, Montmeló, Catalonia, Spain
- Course: Permanent racing facility
- Course length: 4.655 km (2.892 miles)
- Distance: 66 laps, 307.024 km (190.826 miles)
- Weather: Sunny
- Attendance: 94,500

Pole position
Driver	(Germany) Nico Rosberg	Mercedes
- Time: 1:20.718

Fastest lap
Driver	(Mexico) Esteban Gutiérrez	Sauber-Ferrari
- Time: 1:26.217 on lap 56

Podium
First	(Spain) Fernando Alonso	Ferrari
Second	(Finland) Kimi Räikkönen	Lotus-Renault
Third	(Brazil) Felipe Massa	Ferrari

The 2013 Spanish Grand Prix (officially the Formula 1 Gran Premio de España 2013) was a Formula One motor race that was held on 12 May 2013 at the Circuit de Catalunya in Montmeló, Spain. The race was the fifth round of the 2013 season, and marked the forty-third running of the Spanish Grand Prix as a round of the Formula One World Championship, and the twenty-third running at Catalunya.

Nico Rosberg took pole position for the race, ahead of his teammate Lewis Hamilton. Fernando Alonso took his thirty-second and most recent Grand Prix victory—and his second in his home race—ahead of Lotus-Renault's Kimi Räikkönen and Ferrari teammate Felipe Massa in third. Pole sitter Nico Rosberg finished sixth overall. The most notable overtaking move came on the first lap as Fernando Alonso went round the outside of both Kimi Räikkönen and Lewis Hamilton going into turn 3. Ferrari's strategy of making 4 pit stops was risky but proved to be the best choice as Alonso was able to beat Räikkönen who did one less to claim victory. This race was the most recent Formula One victory for Alonso as of 2026, the last race to be won by a Spanish driver until Carlos Sainz Jr. won the 2022 British Grand Prix, and the last race to be won by Ferrari until the 2015 Malaysian Grand Prix.

== Classification ==
=== Qualifying ===
Pos.	No.	Driver	Constructor	Q1	Q2	Q3	Grid
1	9	(Germany) Nico Rosberg	Mercedes	1:21.913	1:21.776	1:20.718	1
2	10	(United Kingdom) Lewis Hamilton	Mercedes	1:21.728	1:21.001	1:20.972	2
3	1	(Germany) Sebastian Vettel	Red Bull-Renault	1:22.158	1:21.602	1:21.054	3
4	7	(Finland) Kimi Räikkönen	Lotus-Renault	1:22.210	1:21.676	1:21.177	4
5	3	(Spain) Fernando Alonso	Ferrari	1:22.264	1:21.646	1:21.218	5
6	4	(Brazil) Felipe Massa	Ferrari	1:22.492	1:21.978	1:21.219	9^{1}
7	8	(France) Romain Grosjean	Lotus-Renault	1:22.613	1:21.998	1:21.308	6
8	2	(Australia) Mark Webber	Red Bull-Renault	1:22.342	1:21.718	1:21.570	7
9	6	(Mexico) Sergio Pérez	McLaren-Mercedes	1:23.116	1:21.790	1:22.069	8
10	14	(United Kingdom) Paul di Resta	Force India-Mercedes	1:22.663	1:22.019	1:22.233	10
11	19	(Australia) Daniel Ricciardo	Toro Rosso-Ferrari	1:22.905	1:22.127		11
12	18	(France) Jean-Éric Vergne	Toro Rosso-Ferrari	1:22.775	1:22.166		12
13	15	(Germany) Adrian Sutil	Force India-Mercedes	1:22.952	1:22.346		13
14	5	(United Kingdom) Jenson Button	McLaren-Mercedes	1:23.166	1:22.355		14
15	11	(Germany) Nico Hülkenberg	Sauber-Ferrari	1:23.058	1:22.389		15
16	12	(Mexico) Esteban Gutiérrez	Sauber-Ferrari	1:23.218	1:22.793		19^{2}
17	17	(Finland) Valtteri Bottas	Williams-Renault	1:23.260			16
18	16	(Venezuela) Pastor Maldonado	Williams-Renault	1:23.318			17
19	21	(Netherlands) Giedo van der Garde	Caterham-Renault	1:24.661			18
20	22	(France) Jules Bianchi	Marussia-Cosworth	1:24.713			20
21	23	(United Kingdom) Max Chilton	Marussia-Cosworth	1:24.996			21
22	20	(France) Charles Pic	Caterham-Renault	1:25.070			22
107% time:1:27.448

- ^1 — Felipe Massa was given a three-place grid penalty for blocking Mark Webber.
- ^2 — Esteban Gutiérrez was given a three-place grid penalty for blocking Kimi Räikkönen.

=== Race ===
Pos.	No.	Driver	Constructor	Laps	Time/Retired	Grid	Points
1	3	(Spain) Fernando Alonso	Ferrari	66	1:39:16.596	5	25
2	7	(Finland) Kimi Räikkönen	Lotus-Renault	66	+9.338	4	18
3	4	(Brazil) Felipe Massa	Ferrari	66	+26.049	9	15
4	1	(Germany) Sebastian Vettel	Red Bull-Renault	66	+38.273	3	12
5	2	(Australia) Mark Webber	Red Bull-Renault	66	+47.963	7	10
6	9	(Germany) Nico Rosberg	Mercedes	66	+1:08.020	1	8
7	14	(United Kingdom) Paul di Resta	Force India-Mercedes	66	+1:08.988	10	6
8	5	(United Kingdom) Jenson Button	McLaren-Mercedes	66	+1:19.506	14	4
9	6	(Mexico) Sergio Pérez	McLaren-Mercedes	66	+1:21.738	8	2
10	19	(Australia) Daniel Ricciardo	Toro Rosso-Ferrari	65	+1 lap	11	1
11	12	(Mexico) Esteban Gutiérrez	Sauber-Ferrari	65	+1 lap	19	
12	10	(United Kingdom) Lewis Hamilton	Mercedes	65	+1 lap	2	
13	15	(Germany) Adrian Sutil	Force India-Mercedes	65	+1 lap	13	
14	16	(Venezuela) Pastor Maldonado	Williams-Renault	65	+1 lap	17	
15	11	(Germany) Nico Hülkenberg	Sauber-Ferrari	65	+1 lap	15	
16	17	(Finland) Valtteri Bottas	Williams-Renault	65	+1 lap	16	
17	20	(France) Charles Pic	Caterham-Renault	65	+1 lap	22	
18	22	(France) Jules Bianchi	Marussia-Cosworth	64	+2 laps	20	
19	23	(United Kingdom) Max Chilton	Marussia-Cosworth	64	+2 laps	21	
Ret	18	(France) Jean-Éric Vergne	Toro Rosso-Ferrari	52	Collision damage	12	
Ret	21	(Netherlands) Giedo van der Garde	Caterham-Renault	21	Wheel	18	
Ret	8	(France) Romain Grosjean	Lotus-Renault	8	Suspension	6	

== Championship standings after the race ==
Drivers' Championship standings

	Pos.	Driver	Points
	1	(Germany) Sebastian Vettel	89
	2	(Finland) Kimi Räikkönen	85
1	3	(Spain) Fernando Alonso	72
1	4	(United Kingdom) Lewis Hamilton	50
1	5	(Brazil) Felipe Massa	45

Constructors' Championship standings

	Pos.	Constructor	Points
	1	(Austria) Red Bull-Renault	131
1	2	(Italy) Ferrari	117
1	3	(United Kingdom) Lotus-Renault	111
	4	(Germany) Mercedes	72
	5	Force India-Mercedes	32

- Note: Only the top five positions are included for both sets of standings.

== See also ==
- 2013 Catalunya GP2 Series round
- 2013 Catalunya GP3 Series round

Previous race: 2013 Bahrain Grand Prix	FIA Formula One World Championship; 2013 season	Next race: 2013 Monaco Grand Prix
Previous race: 2012 Spanish Grand Prix	Spanish Grand Prix	Next race: 2014 Spanish Grand Prix
