= 2013 Bahrain Grand Prix =

Race 4 of 19 in the 2013 Formula One World Championship
← Previous race	Next race →
- Layout of the Bahrain International Circuit

Race details
- Date: 21 April 2013
- Official name: 2013 Formula 1 Gulf Air Bahrain Grand Prix
- Location: Bahrain International Circuit; Sakhir, Bahrain
- Course: Permanent racing facility
- Course length: 5.412 km (3.363 miles)
- Distance: 57 laps, 308.238 km (191.530 miles)
- Weather: Sunny
- Attendance: 73,000 (Weekend) 31,000 (Race Day)

Pole position
Driver	(Germany) Nico Rosberg	Mercedes
- Time: 1:32.330

Fastest lap
Driver	(Germany) Sebastian Vettel	Red Bull-Renault
- Time: 1:36.961 on lap 55

Podium
First	(Germany) Sebastian Vettel	Red Bull-Renault
Second	(Finland) Kimi Räikkönen	Lotus-Renault
Third	(France) Romain Grosjean	Lotus-Renault

The 2013 Bahrain Grand Prix (formally known as the 2013 Formula 1 Gulf Air Bahrain Grand Prix) was a Formula One motor race held on 21 April 2013 at the Bahrain International Circuit in Sakhir, Bahrain. Contested over 57 laps, it was the fourth round of the 2013 season, and the ninth time that the Bahrain Grand Prix had been held as a round of the Formula One World Championship. The controversial race went ahead despite ongoing protests which had been taking place since the cancellation of the 2011 event.

Mercedes' Nico Rosberg started the race from pole. Sebastian Vettel won the race, with Lotus F1 drivers Kimi Räikkönen and Romain Grosjean completing the podium, meaning that the top 3 finishers were identical to the 2012 event in the same order.

This was also the last Bahrain Grand Prix to take place during the daytime, as the event switched to a night race from the 2014 race onwards, until the 2026 Bahrain Grand Prix, which was held in the Sepang International Circuit instead.

== Report ==
=== Background ===
Tyre supplier Pirelli had originally planned to bring their hard and soft compounds of tyre to the race, to be designated as the prime and the option respectively. However, the teams experienced problems with the soft compound at the Chinese Grand Prix, with the tyres degrading after just seven laps, which prompted Pirelli to alter their allocation for the Bahrain Grand Prix, changing the options from the soft compound to the medium. Before the race, a minute of silence was held as a mark of respect for those who had lost their lives in the Boston Marathon bombings six days earlier.

This race also marked the 200th Grand Prix for Mark Webber.

==== Anti-government protests ====
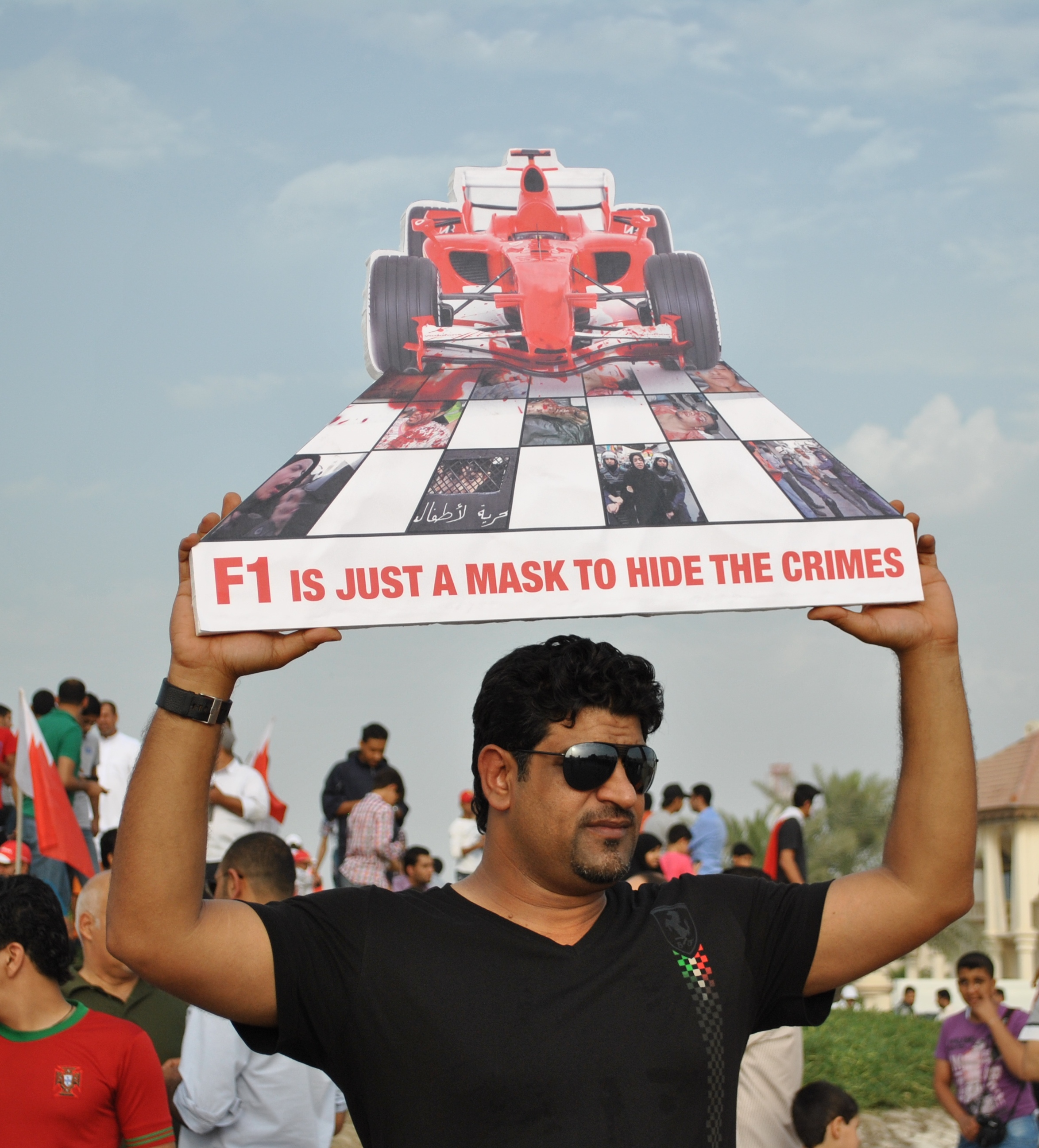
A Bahraini protester holding an anti-F1 sign

In the context of the 2011 Bahraini uprising, public protests also occurred over the 2013 staging of the race, after the 2011 event was cancelled and the 2012 event went ahead despite efforts by demonstrators to disrupt the race. According to Reuters, the race went ahead "largely unhindered" by the protests. Reflecting on the changes in the government strategy compared to 2012, they concluded that the public relations battle over this year's race had produced a stalemate, reflecting the situation in the opposition movement generally.

=== Race ===
At the start, Nico Rosberg maintained the lead of the race, followed by Fernando Alonso, Sebastian Vettel, Paul di Resta and Felipe Massa. Vettel was able to pass Alonso already during the first lap, and Rosberg on the third, thus taking the lead. Alonso engaged, in turn, in a long duel with Rosberg, before passing him on lap 5. After a lap, the German was also overtaken by di Resta. Around the same time, Adrian Sutil, Jean-Éric Vergne and Giedo van der Garde were involved in a collision.

Fernando Alonso was forced to pit on lap seven to fix the DRS, which remained open on his car: he returned to the track seventeenth. The Spaniard tried to use the device again, which blocked again, forcing him to stop again one lap later.

Between laps 10 and 11, the best drivers changed tires. Paul di Resta now led, followed by Kimi Räikkönen and Nico Hülkenberg. Vettel returned to the lead definitively on lap 15 after overtaking Räikkönen and the first pit stop for di Resta. At this point, Vettel led Räikkönen, Mark Webber, Nico Rosberg, Jenson Button, Felipe Massa, Romain Grosjean, Sergio Pérez and di Resta. Räikkönen changed tires on lap 16, while, one lap later, Massa was forced to change tires again due to the dechapping of the right rear.

On lap 19, both Button and Grosjean passed Rosberg, who changed tires for the second time one lap later; Button and Grosjean engaged in a great duel, which ended with Button's pit stop on lap 21. Four laps later it was Vettel's turn, who maintained the lead of the race, followed by Grosjean, di Resta, Räikkönen, Webber, Pérez and Button. One lap later di Resta moved into second, passing Grosjean, who then pitted on lap 27. On laps 23 and 24, after a heated battle, the two McLaren drivers got the better of Nico Rosberg. Between laps 29 and 32, Jenson Button and Sergio Pérez then fought for fifth place, with the Englishman passing the Mexican and then resisting his counterattacks. However, the Englishman wore out his tyres and had to anticipate his third stop, like Rosberg.

On lap 34, Räikkönen gained second place after overtaking di Resta and pitted for the second time, a couple of laps before the Scotsman; from behind, Alonso appeared again in the points. Three laps later, Webber made his third pit stop, then on lap 42, it was also Vettel and Grosjean's turn. Vettel still led, followed by Kimi Räikkönen, Paul di Resta, Mark Webber and Romain Grosjean: one lap later, the Frenchman took a position from Webber.

On lap 44, Hamilton passed Button for sixth place; the McLaren driver was also then passed by Pérez and Alonso. The Spaniard, even without DRS, managed to get the better of Pérez on the main straight at the start of lap 47. The final laps were animated by the battle between Hamilton and Webber: the Englishman passed for the first time on lap 51, being passed again by the Australian a couple of laps later, before finally gaining the position, after repeated attacks, at the start of the final lap. Webber was also passed by Sergio Pérez, who had repassed Fernando Alonso on lap 54. In the meantime, during the fifty-second lap, Grosjean had taken the final spot podium at the expense of Paul di Resta.

Sebastian Vettel, Kimi Räikkönen and Romain Grosjean repeated the exact same podium as in 2012. This previously occurred in the 1964 and 1965 editions of the British Grand Prix (with Jim Clark first, Graham Hill second and John Surtees third) and in the 1998 and 1999 editions of the Spanish Grand Prix (with Mika Häkkinen first, David Coulthard second and Michael Schumacher third).

This was the second time a woman had taken to the Formula 1 podium to receive the Manufacturers' Award, and it was Gill Jones, Red Bull Racing’s Head of Trackside Electronics, stood.

== Classification ==
=== Qualifying ===
Pos.	No.	Driver	Constructor	Q1	Q2	Q3	Grid
1	9	(Germany) Nico Rosberg	Mercedes	1:33.364	1:32.867	1:32.330	1
2	1	(Germany) Sebastian Vettel	Red Bull-Renault	1:33.327	1:32.746	1:32.584	2
3	3	(Spain) Fernando Alonso	Ferrari	1:32.878	1:33.316	1:32.667	3
4	10	(United Kingdom) Lewis Hamilton	Mercedes	1:33.498	1:33.346	1:32.762	9^{1}
5	2	(Australia) Mark Webber	Red Bull-Renault	1:33.966	1:33.098	1:33.078	7^{2}
6	4	(Brazil) Felipe Massa	Ferrari	1:33.780	1:33.358	1:33.207	4
7	14	(United Kingdom) Paul di Resta	Force India-Mercedes	1:33.762	1:33.335	1:33.235	5
8	15	(Germany) Adrian Sutil	Force India-Mercedes	1:34.048	1:33.378	1:33.246	6
9	7	(Finland) Kimi Räikkönen	Lotus-Renault	1:33.827	1:33.146	1:33.327	8
10	5	(United Kingdom) Jenson Button	McLaren-Mercedes	1:34.071	1:33.702	no time	10
11	8	(France) Romain Grosjean	Lotus-Renault	1:33.498	1:33.762		11
12	6	(Mexico) Sergio Pérez	McLaren-Mercedes	1:34.310	1:33.914		12
13	19	(Australia) Daniel Ricciardo	Toro Rosso-Ferrari	1:34.120	1:33.974		13
14	11	(Germany) Nico Hülkenberg	Sauber-Ferrari	1:34.409	1:33.976		14
15	17	(Finland) Valtteri Bottas	Williams-Renault	1:34.425	1:34.105		15
16	18	(France) Jean-Éric Vergne	Toro Rosso-Ferrari	1:34.314	1:34.284		16
17	16	(Venezuela) Pastor Maldonado	Williams-Renault	1:34.425^{3}			17
18	12	(Mexico) Esteban Gutiérrez	Sauber-Ferrari	1:34.730			22^{4}
19	20	(France) Charles Pic	Caterham-Renault	1:35.283			18
20	22	(France) Jules Bianchi	Marussia-Cosworth	1:36.178			19
21	21	(Netherlands) Giedo van der Garde	Caterham-Renault	1:36.304			20
22	23	(United Kingdom) Max Chilton	Marussia-Cosworth	1:36.476			21
107% time: 1:39.379

Notes:

- ^1 — Lewis Hamilton was given a five-place grid penalty for an unscheduled gearbox change.
- ^2 — Mark Webber was given a three-place grid penalty for his role in causing an avoidable accident with Jean-Éric Vergne at the previous round of the championship. (Note: As penalties are applied in the order that they are incurred, Webber was first moved from fifth to eighth. Hamilton's penalty was then applied, moving him from fourth to ninth, and Webber was moved back up to seventh on the grid.)
- ^3 — Valtteri Bottas and Pastor Maldonado recorded identical times during Q1. As Bottas set his time before Maldonado, he was considered to have placed higher than Maldonado, and so advanced to Q2 while Maldonado was eliminated.
- ^4 — Esteban Gutiérrez was given a five-place grid penalty for causing an avoidable accident with Adrian Sutil in the previous race.

=== Race ===
Pos.	No.	Driver	Constructor	Laps	Time/Retired	Grid	Points
1	1	(Germany) Sebastian Vettel	Red Bull-Renault	57	1:36:00.498	2	25
2	7	(Finland) Kimi Räikkönen	Lotus-Renault	57	+9.111	8	18
3	8	(France) Romain Grosjean	Lotus-Renault	57	+19.507	11	15
4	14	(United Kingdom) Paul di Resta	Force India-Mercedes	57	+21.727	5	12
5	10	(United Kingdom) Lewis Hamilton	Mercedes	57	+35.230	9	10
6	6	(Mexico) Sergio Pérez	McLaren-Mercedes	57	+35.998	12	8
7	2	(Australia) Mark Webber	Red Bull-Renault	57	+37.244	7	6
8	3	(Spain) Fernando Alonso	Ferrari	57	+37.574	3	4
9	9	(Germany) Nico Rosberg	Mercedes	57	+41.126	1	2
10	5	(United Kingdom) Jenson Button	McLaren-Mercedes	57	+46.631	10	1
11	16	(Venezuela) Pastor Maldonado	Williams-Renault	57	+1:06.450	17	
12	11	(Germany) Nico Hülkenberg	Sauber-Ferrari	57	+1:12.933	14	
13	15	(Germany) Adrian Sutil	Force India-Mercedes	57	+1:16.719	6	
14	17	(Finland) Valtteri Bottas	Williams-Renault	57	+1:21.511	15	
15	4	(Brazil) Felipe Massa	Ferrari	57	+1:26.364	4	
16	19	(Australia) Daniel Ricciardo	Toro Rosso-Ferrari	56	+1 lap	13	
17	20	(France) Charles Pic	Caterham-Renault	56	+1 lap	18	
18	12	(Mexico) Esteban Gutiérrez	Sauber-Ferrari	56	+1 lap	22	
19	22	(France) Jules Bianchi	Marussia-Cosworth	56	+1 lap	19	
20	23	(United Kingdom) Max Chilton	Marussia-Cosworth	56	+1 lap	21	
21	21	(Netherlands) Giedo van der Garde	Caterham-Renault	55	+2 laps	20	
Ret	18	(France) Jean-Éric Vergne	Toro Rosso-Ferrari	16	Puncture damage	16	

== Championship standings after the race ==
Drivers' Championship standings

	Pos.	Driver	Points
	1	(Germany) Sebastian Vettel	77
	2	(Finland) Kimi Räikkönen	67
1	3	(United Kingdom) Lewis Hamilton	50
1	4	(Spain) Fernando Alonso	47
1	5	(Australia) Mark Webber	32

Constructors' Championship standings

	Pos.	Constructor	Points
	1	(Austria) Red Bull-Renault	109
1	2	(United Kingdom) Lotus-Renault	93
1	3	(Italy) Ferrari	77
	4	(Germany) Mercedes	64
1	5	Force India-Mercedes	26

- Note: Only the top five positions are included for both sets of standings.

== See also ==
- 2013 Bahrain GP2 Series round

== Footnotes ==
Previous race: 2013 Chinese Grand Prix	FIA Formula One World Championship; 2013 season	Next race: 2013 Spanish Grand Prix
Previous race: 2012 Bahrain Grand Prix	Bahrain Grand Prix	Next race: 2014 Bahrain Grand Prix
