= Force India VJM06 =

Formula One racing car

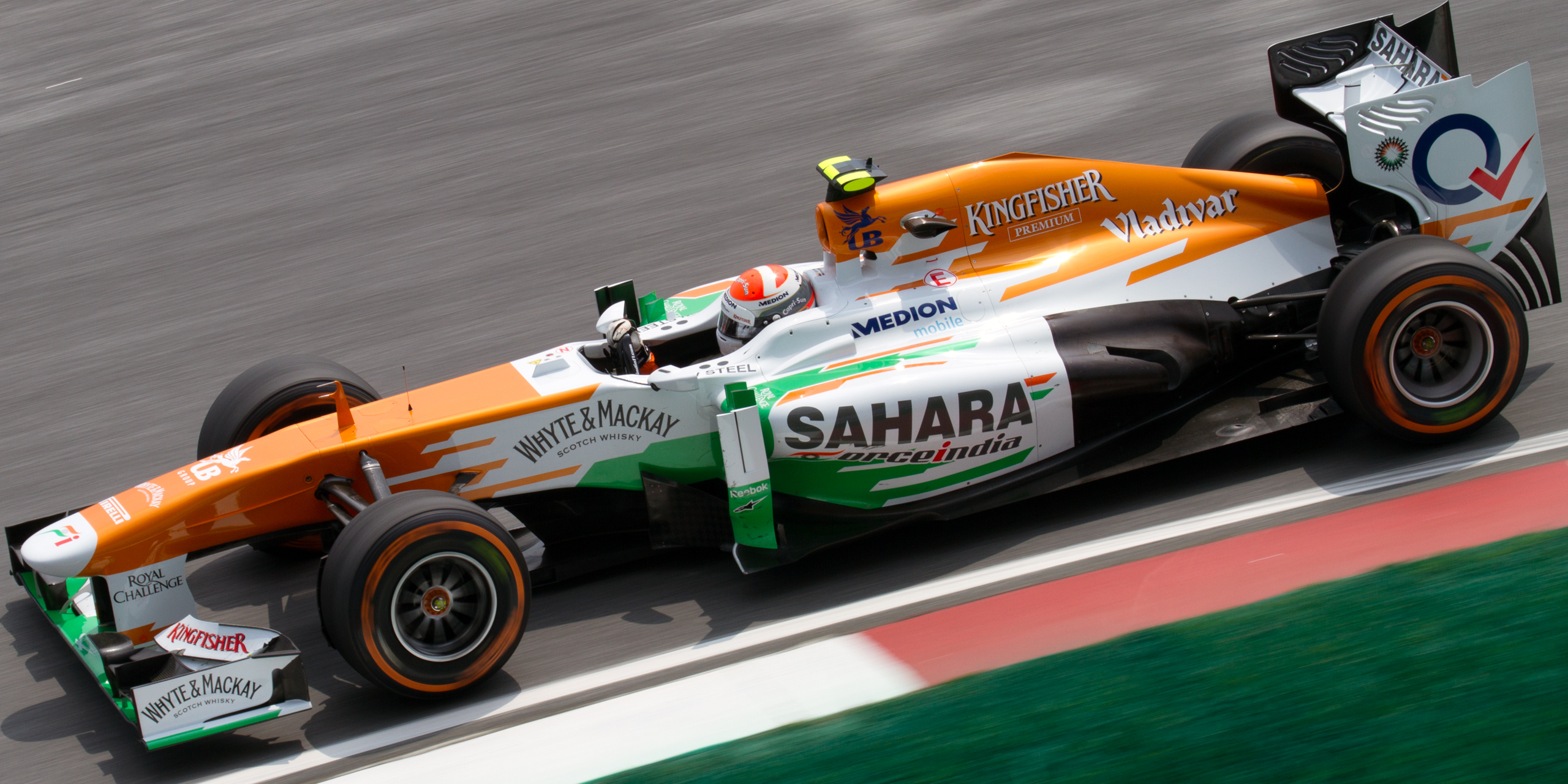
- The VJM06 driven by Adrian Sutil at the Malaysian Grand Prix
- Category: Formula One
- Constructor: Force India
- Designers: Andrew Green (Technical Director); Simon Phillips (Aerodynamics Director); Ian Hall (Chief Designer); Bruce Eddington (Head of Design, Composites); Daniel Carpenter (Head of Design, Mechanical); Simon Gardner (Head of R&D); James Knapton (Head of Vehicle Science); Simon Belcher (Chief Aerodynamicist)
- Predecessor: Force India VJM05
- Successor: Force India VJM07

Technical specifications
- Chassis: Carbon fibre composite monocoque with Zylon legality side anti-intrusion panels.
- Suspension (front): Aluminium uprights with carbon fibre composite wishbones, trackrod and pushrod. Inboard chassis mounted torsion springs, dampers and anti-roll bar assembly.
- Suspension (rear): Aluminium uprights with carbon fibre composite wishbones, trackrod and pullrod. Inboard gearbox mounted torsion springs, dampers and anti-roll bar assembly.
- Engine: Mercedes-Benz FO 108F 2.4 L (146 cu in) V8 (90°). Naturally aspirated, 18,000 RPM limited with Mercedes AMG High Performance Powertrains KERS, mid-mounted.
- Transmission: McLaren Racing McLaren Racing 7-speed, semi-automatic, 'e-shift'
- Weight: 642 kg (1,415.4 lb) (including driver)
- Fuel: Mobil; Mobil 1 product lubricant
- Tyres: Pirelli P Zero (dry), Cinturato (wet)

Competition history
- Notable entrants: Sahara Force India F1 Team
- Notable drivers: 14. (United Kingdom) Paul di Resta; 15. (Germany) Adrian Sutil
- Debut: 2013 Australian Grand Prix
- Last event: 2013 Brazilian Grand Prix
Races	Wins	Podiums	Poles	F/Laps
19	0	0	0	0

The Force India VJM06 is a Formula One racing car designed and built by the Force India team for use in the 2013 season where it was driven by Paul di Resta and Adrian Sutil, who returned to the team after spending the 2012 season out of the sport. The car was launched on 1 February 2013 at the team's base near the Silverstone Circuit, and is complete redesign of the previous year's car.

It was the last British-based F1 foreign car to utilize ExxonMobil fuels and lubricants before its use for Red Bull RB13 in 2017.

== Season summary ==
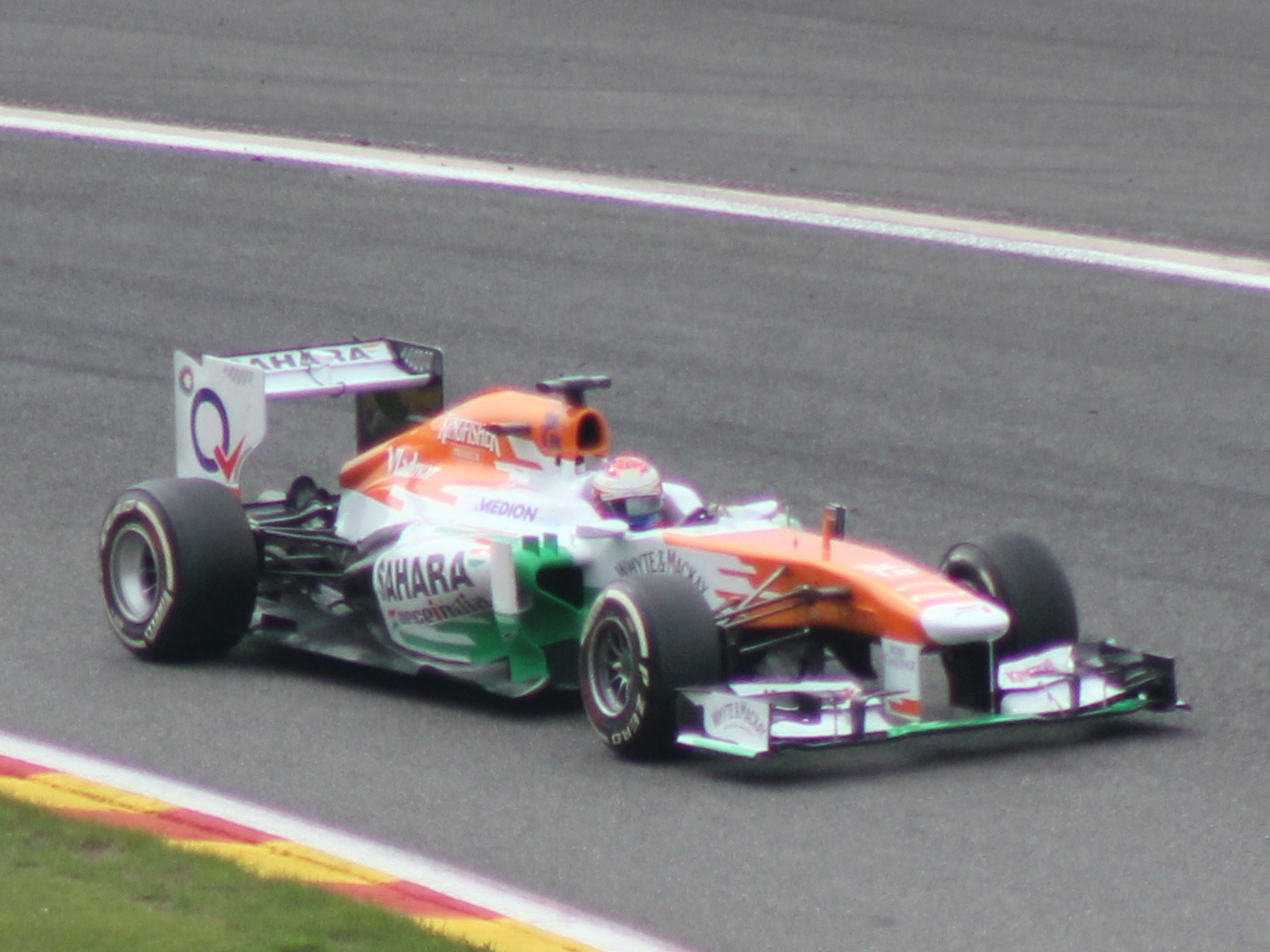
Di Resta at the Belgian Grand Prix, where he would end up retiring from the race

After a quiet pre-season, the VJM06 surprised everyone in Australia, with Sutil leading the race for several laps and finishing in the points alongside Di Resta. In Malaysia, they looked like contenders for a repeat of their strong result, but both cars had to retire due to wheel nut issues. The thread, which had to be removed with the wheel nut, became stuck in the wheel hub, preventing the nut from being retightened. As the problem had not occurred during testing or the Australia, and only affected the wheel nuts on the left side of the car, Force India believed that the cause was a combination of factors, including the high temperatures in Malaysia and the increased stress placed on the wheel nuts on the left side of the car.

Di Resta achieved his best result of the season in fourth at Bahrain Grand Prix, while Sutil achieved fifth in Monaco Grand Prix. Force India would finish the season in sixth in the World Constructors' Championship with 77 points.

== Sponsorship and livery ==
The livery is almost identical to its predecessor with a minor changes. This was the final year the team used white paint as a base colour. Their title sponsor, Sahara India Pariwar returned for the second year along with renewed sponsors; Kingfisher, Royal Challenge, Whyte & Mackay and Airbus. Medion once again left the team as Sutil moved to Sauber the following season.

At the Canadian Grand Prix, the team celebrated its 100th race and the car featured the 100th GP logo. At the Hungarian Grand Prix, Sutil celebrated his 100th race and used a specially designed helmet.

== Complete Formula One results ==
(key) (results in bold indicate pole position; results in italics indicate fastest lap)

Year	Entrant	Engine	Tyres	Drivers	Grands Prix																			Points	WCC
Year	Entrant	Engine	Tyres	Drivers	AUS	MAL	CHN	BHR	ESP	MON	CAN	GBR	GER	HUN	BEL	ITA	SIN	KOR	JPN	IND	ABU	USA	BRA	Points	WCC
2013	Sahara Force India F1 Team	Mercedes-Benz; FO 108F	**P**	Paul di Resta	8	Ret	8	4	7	9	7	9	11	18^{†}	Ret	Ret	20^{†}	Ret	11	8	6	15	11	77	6th
2013	Sahara Force India F1 Team	Mercedes-Benz; FO 108F	**P**	Adrian Sutil	7	Ret	Ret	13	13	5	10	7	13	Ret	9	16^{†}	10	20^{†}	14	9	10	Ret	13	77	6th

^{†} Driver failed to finish the race, but was classified as they had completed greater than 90% of the race distance.
