= 2013 British Grand Prix =

Race 8 of 19 in the 2013 Formula One World Championship
← Previous race	Next race →
- Silverstone Circuit

Race details
- Date: 30 June 2013
- Official name: 2013 Formula 1 Santander British Grand Prix
- Location: Silverstone Circuit, Silverstone, United Kingdom
- Course: Permanent racing facility
- Course length: 5.891 km (3.661 miles)
- Distance: 52 laps, 306.198 km (190.263 (Note: There was an offset of 0.134 km (0.083 mi) between the start and finish line.) miles)
- Weather: Dry
- Attendance: 120,000

Pole position
Driver	(United Kingdom) Lewis Hamilton	Mercedes
- Time: 1:29.607

Fastest lap
Driver	(Australia) Mark Webber	Red Bull-Renault
- Time: 1:33.401 on lap 52

Podium
First	(Germany) Nico Rosberg	Mercedes
Second	(Australia) Mark Webber	Red Bull-Renault
Third	(Spain) Fernando Alonso	Ferrari

The 2013 British Grand Prix (formally the 2013 Formula 1 Santander British Grand Prix) was a Formula One motor race held at the Silverstone Circuit in Silverstone, England, United Kingdom, on 30 June 2013 before 120,000 spectators. It was the eighth round of the 2013 Formula One World Championship and the 64th British Grand Prix to be held as part of the series. Mercedes driver Nico Rosberg won the 52-lap race starting from second position. Mark Webber of the Red Bull team finished second and Fernando Alonso took third in a Ferrari.

Before the race, Sebastian Vettel led the World Drivers' Championship while his team Red Bull led the World Constructors' Championship. Lewis Hamilton, Rosberg's teammate, won the pole position by setting the fastest lap in qualifying. He led for the first seven laps until his car's left-rear tyre failed on lap eight, promoting Vettel to the race lead. Two more left-rear tyre failures for Ferrari's Felipe Massa and Toro Rosso driver Jean-Éric Vergne led to race director Charlie Whiting deploying the safety car. The race was restarted at the end of lap 21 with Vettel leading. He led for the next 20 laps before a gearbox failure forced him to retire on the 41st lap and cause a second safety car deployment. Rosberg took the lead, and held off Webber for the rest of the race to achieve his second victory of the season and the third of his career.

A total of six tyre failures occurred during the race and supplier Pirelli modified them to make them less susceptible to punctures for the following German Grand Prix as a stop-gap solution before introducing a new tyre at the Hungarian Grand Prix. Pirelli investigated the incidents and concluded there was no single cause. As a result of the race, Alonso moved to within 21 championship points of the World Drivers' Championship leader Vettel. Kimi Räikkönen of the Lotus team finished fifth to remain in third and Hamilton maintained fourth place. In the World Constructors' Championship, Mercedes overtook Ferrari, moving to within 48 championship points behind Red Bull with 11 rounds remaining in the season.

== Background ==
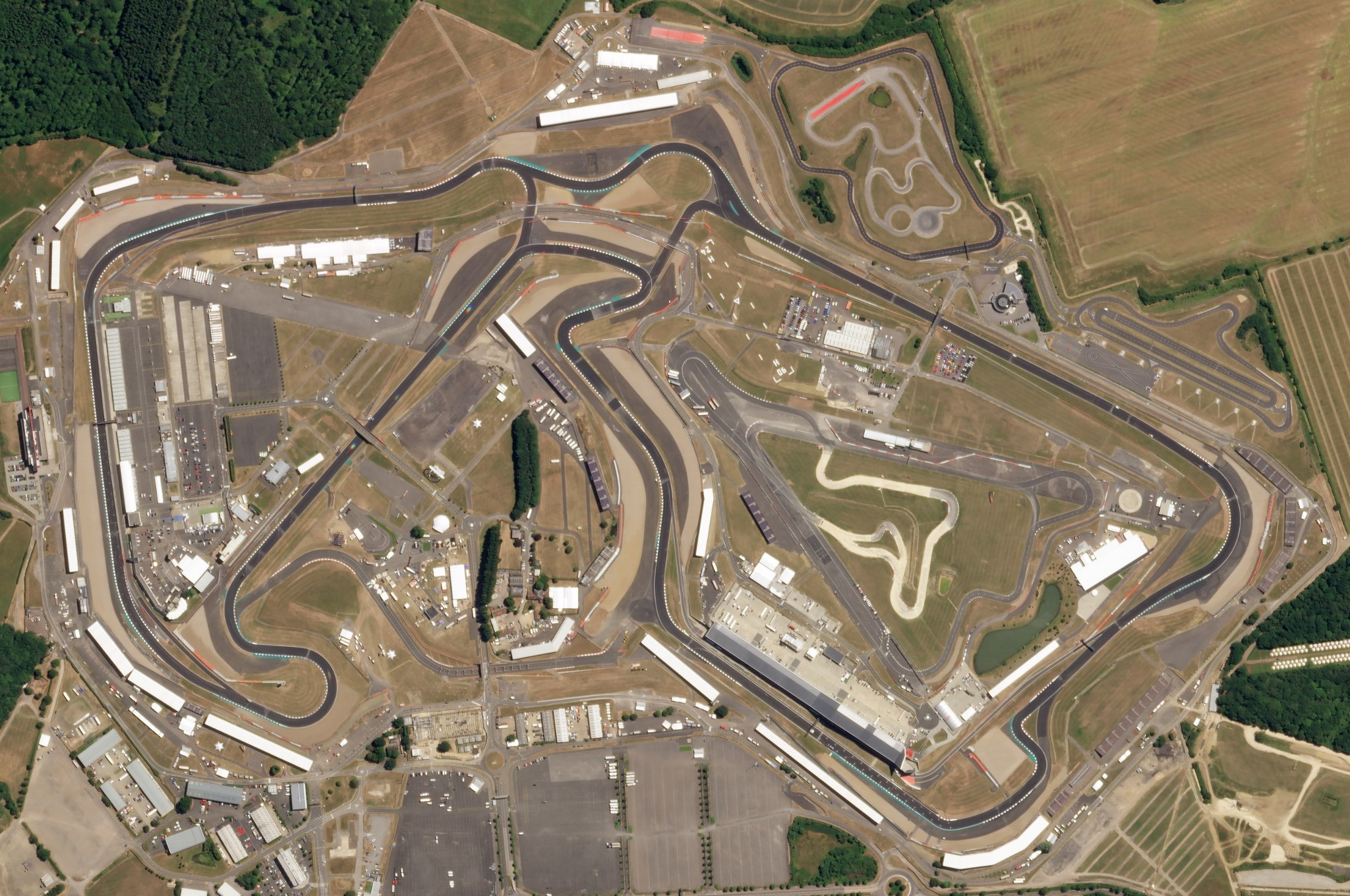
The Silverstone Circuit (pictured in 2018), where the race was held

The round was the eighth of the 19 races in the 2013 FIA Formula One World Championship, and the 64th British Grand Prix as part of the series. It was held at the 18-turn 5.891 km (3.660 mi) Silverstone Circuit in Silverstone, Northamptonshire, England, on 30 June. Tyre supplier Pirelli brought the white-banded medium and the orange-banded hard compound dry tyres and the green-banded intermediate and dark blue-banded full wet tyres to the race. The drag reduction system (DRS) was expanded from one to two activation zones for 2013: one was on the Wellington Straight on the entry to Brooklands corner and the second was on the Hangar Straight linking Chapel and Stowe turns. For the race, several drains to improve circuit drainage and prevent water accumulation were installed, and the outside tyre wall at the exit to Chapel Curve was extended by 50 m (160 ft).

Before the race, Red Bull driver Sebastian Vettel led the World Drivers' Championship with 132 championship points, ahead of Ferrari's Fernando Alonso with 96 championship points and Lotus' Kimi Räikkönen with 88 championship points. Lewis Hamilton of the Mercedes team was fourth with 77 championship points and Vettel's teammate Mark Webber was fifth with 69 championship points. Red Bull led the World Constructors' Championship with 201 championship points; Ferrari and Mercedes were second and third respectively, with 145 and 134 championship points. Lotus were fourth with 114 championship points and Force India were fifth with 51 championship points.

Vettel won the preceding Canadian Grand Prix from Alonso, but did not want to speculate on the outcome at Silverstone or the championship. "Fernando was a little bit unlucky here and there and we were able to beat him, so we were able to come back but this was ten races from where we are now so I think there are so many things that can happen at that stage of the championship." Alonso said Ferrari could not make more errors and lose extra championship points. He was confident about his prospects at Silverstone because of Ferrari's recent competitiveness there saying, "We have an interesting weekend ahead of us, but we can approach it with confidence, knowing we have a good opportunity." Stirling Moss, the 1955 British Grand Prix winner for Mercedes, felt Hamilton could possibly win the race and Hamilton himself wanted to win at Silverstone for the second time. Hamilton said he was looking forward to learning how his car would perform and felt Mercedes would be competitive at Silverstone. His teammate Nico Rosberg commented his aim was to score championship points at the race.

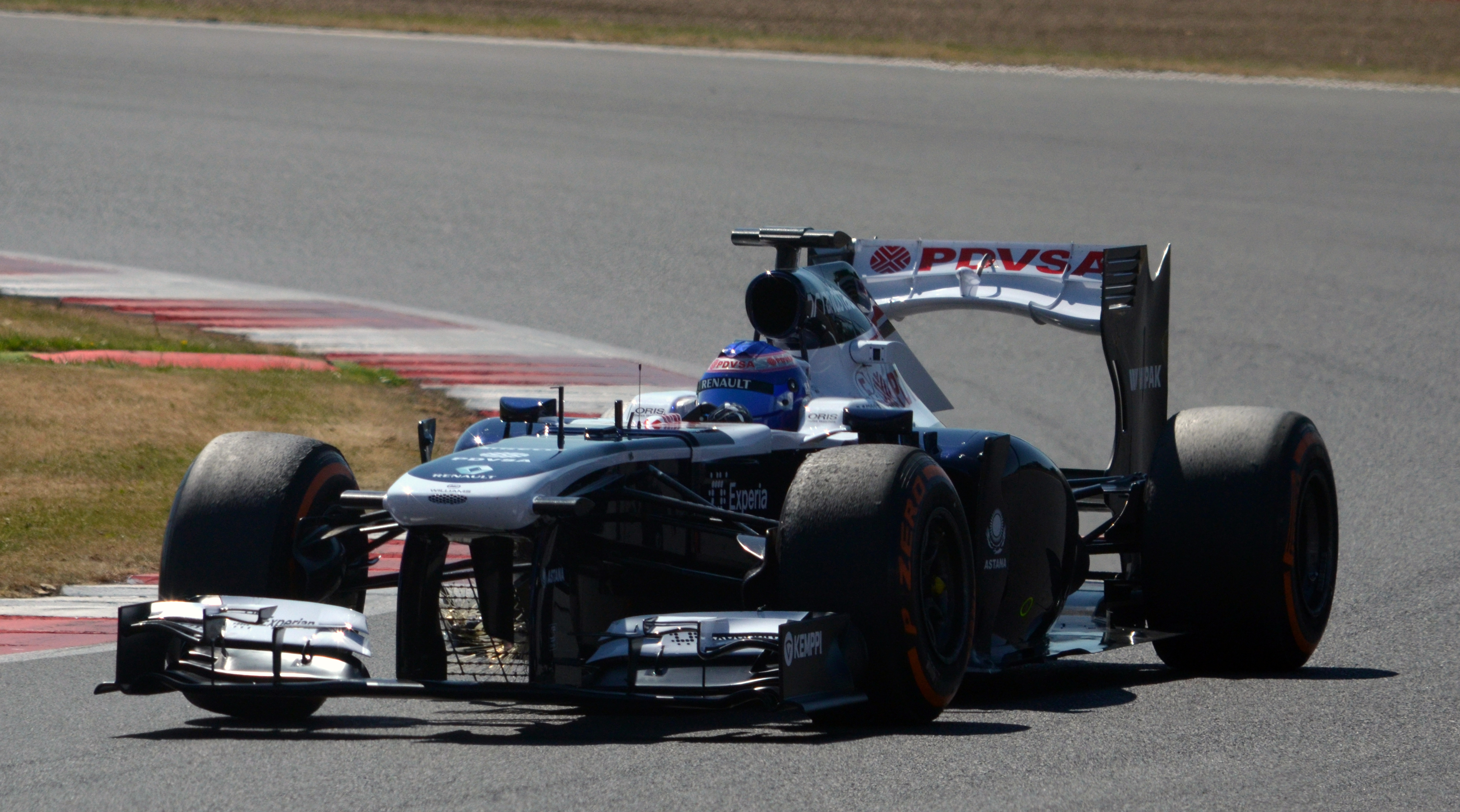
Susie Wolff was the first woman to drive a Formula One car in an official session since 1992 at the post-race test held at the circuit

The second mid-season test of 2013 was held at the circuit three weeks after the race. Auto GP driver Kimiya Sato and GP3 Series racers Daniil Kvyat and Carlos Sainz Jr. made their first appearances in a Formula One test session for the Sauber and Toro Rosso teams respectively, while World Series by Renault driver Will Stevens drove a Caterham. The Marussia team entered Tio Ellinas from the GP3 Series, and Susie Wolff drove a Williams car, becoming the first woman to drive a Formula One car in an official session since Giovanna Amati in 1992. The Mercedes team were not allowed to enter the test because the Fédération Internationale de l'Automobile (FIA; Formula One's governing body) International Tribunal concluded they broke the regulations by running its 2013 car in an illegal test session with Pirelli at the Circuit de Catalunya a month prior.

The Grand Prix saw 11 teams (each representing a different constructor) entering two drivers each for a total of 22 competitors and there were no changes from the season-entry list. James Rossiter, Force India's simulator driver, was due to drive a VJM06 car in lieu of Adrian Sutil during the first free practice session to gather simulation data until inclement weather cancelled the plan.

Some teams modified their cars for the race. Ferrari introduced a new rear wing featuring an alteration in its vertical slot in the F138's endplate's lower front. Mercedes installed a cable-free thermic sensor on the F1 W04's front wing to monitor the front tyres. Lotus used a "double DRS" system on Räikkönen's E21 car to direct airflow and lower downforce for the first time in a race after evaluating it in Friday practice sessions in 2012 and the 2013 pre-season test session. The team also modified the car's suspension system, introduced a new front wing and multiple aerodynamic upgrades in anticipation of improving performance.

== Practice ==
Per the regulations for the 2013 season, three practice sessions were held, two 90-minute sessions on Friday and another 60-minute session on Saturday. The first session occurred in wet weather, which had moved in on Thursday afternoon. Water streams formed across some turns and several drivers lost control of their cars. No one set a fast lap until after 75 minutes since teams were reluctant to send drivers onto the wet track. Daniel Ricciardo of the Toro Rosso team set the fastest lap, a 1:54.249, ahead of Sauber's Nico Hülkenberg, Williams driver Pastor Maldonado, Hamilton, Sauber's Esteban Gutiérrez and Maldonado's teammate Valtteri Bottas in positions two to six. Charles Pic lost control of the rear of his Caterham and collided with the barrier at Club turn, removing the front wing. Gutiérrez aquaplaned at the first corner but regained control of his car.

Conditions improved as the rain showers eased up. The GP2 Series practice session removed some standing water, allowing drivers to head out as the second session began. Drivers used intermediate tyres early on, but used dry tyres after ten minutes. Rosberg recorded the day's fastest lap, a 1:32.248, with 40 minutes to go. The Red Bull duo of Webber and Vettel, Force India's Paul di Resta, Hamilton, Ricciardo and his Toro Rosso teammate Jean-Éric Vergne, Sutil, Lotus' Romain Grosjean and Alonso followed in positions two to ten. Felipe Massa was limited to seven timed laps because he lost control of the rear of his Ferrari on a damp area at the exit of Stowe corner, damaging the front suspension sliding across the inside tyre barrier before stopping at the pit lane entry.

After the session, Hamilton was summoned to the stewards and received his first reprimand of the season for not complying with their instructions to remain to the right of a bollard for safety reasons entering the pit lane. In the final session, which took place in clear and warmer weather and saw both dry compound tyres used, Rosberg was again fastest with a 1:31.487 lap. Hamilton, Vettel, Webber, Grosjean, Ricciardo, Alonso, Räikkönen, Sutil and Di Resta completed the top ten. McLaren's Sergio Pérez sustained a left-front tyre puncture at the exit to Copse turn, which was caused by an unidentified object creating a large cut in the wheel's sidewall and damaging the car's floor. Officials stopped the session briefly after 13 minutes to clean the track. Pérez's car was repaired for him to drive the final ten minutes before spinning backwards at Becketts Curve.

== Qualifying ==
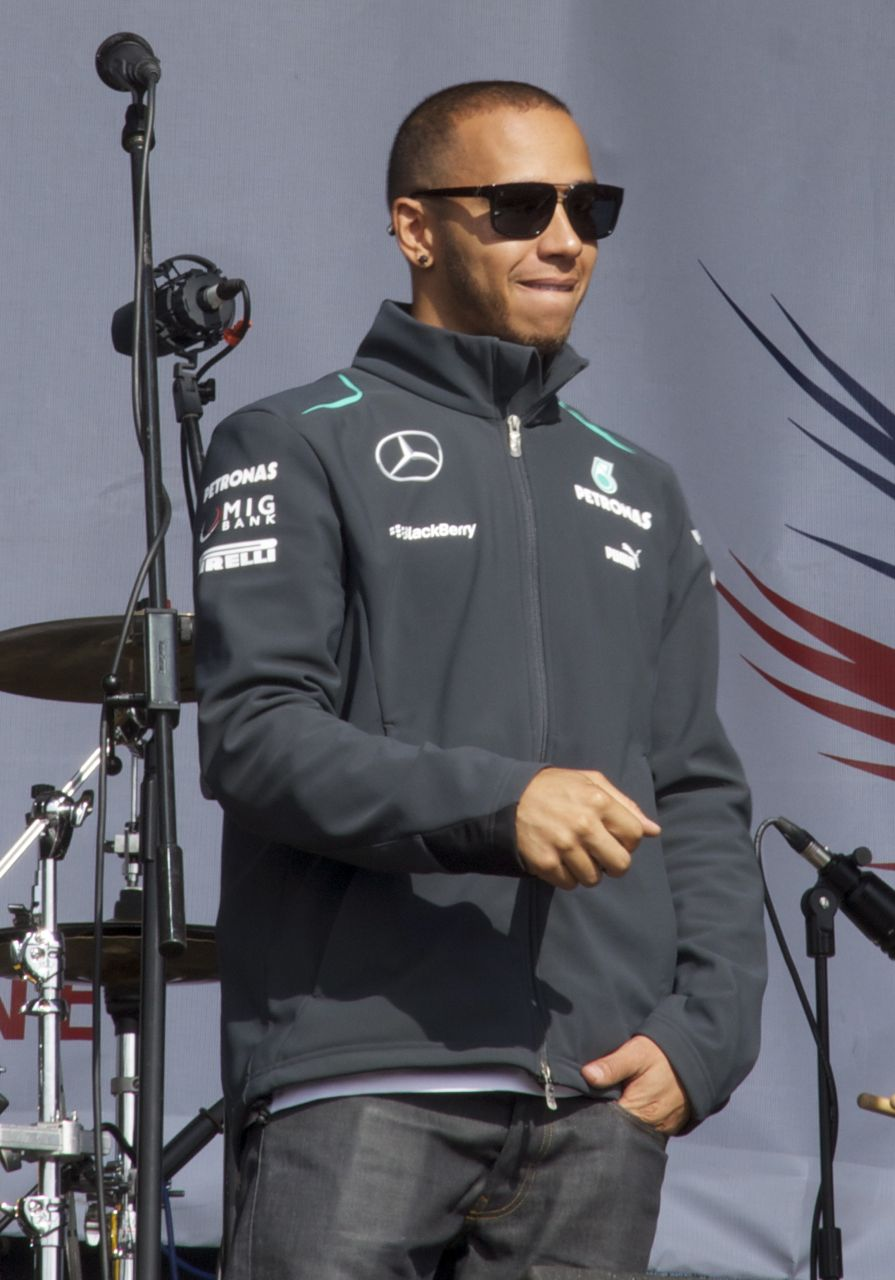
Lewis Hamilton took the 28th pole position of his career in qualifying.

Saturday afternoon's qualifying session was divided into three parts. The first 18-minute session eliminated cars that finished 17th or lower. The 107% rule was in effect, requiring drivers to reach a time within 107 per cent of the quickest lap to qualify. The second 15-minute session eliminated cars that finished 11th to 16th. The final ten-minute session determined pole position to tenth. Cars that progressed to the final session were not allowed to change tyres for the race's start, using the tyres with which they set their quickest lap times in the third session. Hamilton took his second pole position of the season and the 28th of his career with a time of 1:29.607 on his final lap. He was joined on the grid's front row by his teammate Rosberg, who battled his teammate for pole position. Mercedes took its first front row lockout at Silverstone since Juan Manuel Fangio and Moss in 1955 and its third of 2013. Vettel took third and Webber was fourth after an error braking for Club corner lost him time. Di Resta and Sutil for Force India took fifth and seventh on a new set of medium tyres; Ricciardo separated the duo in sixth. Grosjean in eighth had an understeer on his final timed lap at turn 15, and his teammate Räikkönen in ninth had issues on the medium tyres.

Alonso, tenth, switched from the hard to the medium compound tyres with the intention of entering the pit lane if his lap was poor. Button took 11th after not progressing to the final session by one-tenth of a second because he required a hard out-lap to generate tyre temperature. 12th-placed Massa was unable to set a fast enough lap after the loss of track time changing his engine after his crash the day before. Vergne, 13th, ran wide at the exit of Becketts Curve on his fastest lap, possibly because of the aerodynamic turbulence of airflow over Vettel's car removing downforce and causing the error. Pérez, 14th, had irrecoverable tyre temperature from being randomly instructed to drive onto the FIA weighbridge and traffic slowing him. Hülkenberg took 15th on his final lap ahead of the Williams duo of Maldonado and Bottas. Gutiérrez in 18th lost time exiting the corners. An improved car balance put Pic 19th, and Marussia's Jules Bianchi drove his improved car to 20th. Van Der Garde and Marussia's Max Chilton were 21st and 22nd respectively.

=== Post-qualifying ===
After the session, the FIA technical delegate Jo Bauer found Di Resta and his Force India car without fuel to be 1.5 kg (3.3 lb) under the minimum weight limit of 642 kg (1,415 lb) and reported this to the stewards. They decided Force India broke series' regulations and ordered Di Resta to start from 22nd. The Force India team did not appeal the decision. Van Der Garde was demoted five grid positions after the stewards concluded he had collided with Hülkenberg at the preceding Canadian Grand Prix. A second five-place grid penalty was imposed on him because Caterham broke a seal to change his gearbox layshaft after qualifying.

=== Qualifying classification ===
The fastest lap in each of the three sessions is denoted in bold.

Pos.	No.	Driver	Constructor	Q1	Q2	Q3	Grid
1	10	(United Kingdom) Lewis Hamilton	Mercedes	**1:30.995**	1:31.224	**1:29.607**	1
2	9	(Germany) Nico Rosberg	Mercedes	1:31.355	1:31.028	1:30.059	2
3	1	(Germany) Sebastian Vettel	Red Bull-Renault	1:31.559	**1:30.990**	1:30.211	3
4	2	(Australia) Mark Webber	Red Bull-Renault	1:31.605	1:31.002	1:30.220	4
5	19	(Australia) Daniel Ricciardo	Toro Rosso-Ferrari	1:32.097	1:31.182	1:30.757	5
6	15	(Germany) Adrian Sutil	Force India-Mercedes	1:32.002	1:31.097	1:30.908	6
7	8	(France) Romain Grosjean	Lotus-Renault	1:31.466	1:31.530	1:30.955	7
8	7	(Finland) Kimi Räikkönen	Lotus-Renault	1:31.400	1:31.592	1:30.962	8
9	3	(Spain) Fernando Alonso	Ferrari	1:32.266	1:31.387	1:30.979	9
10	5	(United Kingdom) Jenson Button	McLaren-Mercedes	1:31.979	1:31.649	N/A	10
11	4	(Brazil) Felipe Massa	Ferrari	1:32.241	1:31.779	N/A	11
12	18	(France) Jean-Éric Vergne	Toro Rosso-Ferrari	1:32.105	1:31.785	N/A	12
13	6	(Mexico) Sergio Pérez	McLaren-Mercedes	1:31.953	1:32.082	N/A	13
14	11	(Germany) Nico Hülkenberg	Sauber-Ferrari	1:32.168	1:32.211	N/A	14
15	16	(Venezuela) Pastor Maldonado	Williams-Renault	1:32.512	1:32.359	N/A	15
16	17	(Finland) Valtteri Bottas	Williams-Renault	1:32.664	N/A	N/A	16
17	12	(Mexico) Esteban Gutiérrez	Sauber-Ferrari	1:32.666	N/A	N/A	17
18	20	(France) Charles Pic	Caterham-Renault	1:33.866	N/A	N/A	18
19	22	(France) Jules Bianchi	Marussia-Cosworth	1:34.108	N/A	N/A	19
20	21	(Netherlands) Giedo van der Garde	Caterham-Renault	1:35.481	N/A	N/A	22^{2}
21	23	(United Kingdom) Max Chilton	Marussia-Cosworth	1:35.858	N/A	N/A	20
EX	14	(United Kingdom) Paul di Resta	Force India-Mercedes	1:32.062	1:31.291	1:30.736	21^{1}
107% time: 1:37.364

Notes:

- **^1** — Paul di Resta was excluded from qualifying and sent to the back of the grid because he and his car were found to be under the minimum weight limit of 640 kg (1,410 lb).
- **^2** — Giedo van der Garde was imposed a five-place grid penalty for causing an accident with Nico Hülkenberg at the preceding Canadian Grand Prix. He later incurred a second five-place grid penalty because the Caterham team had changed his gearbox.

== Race ==
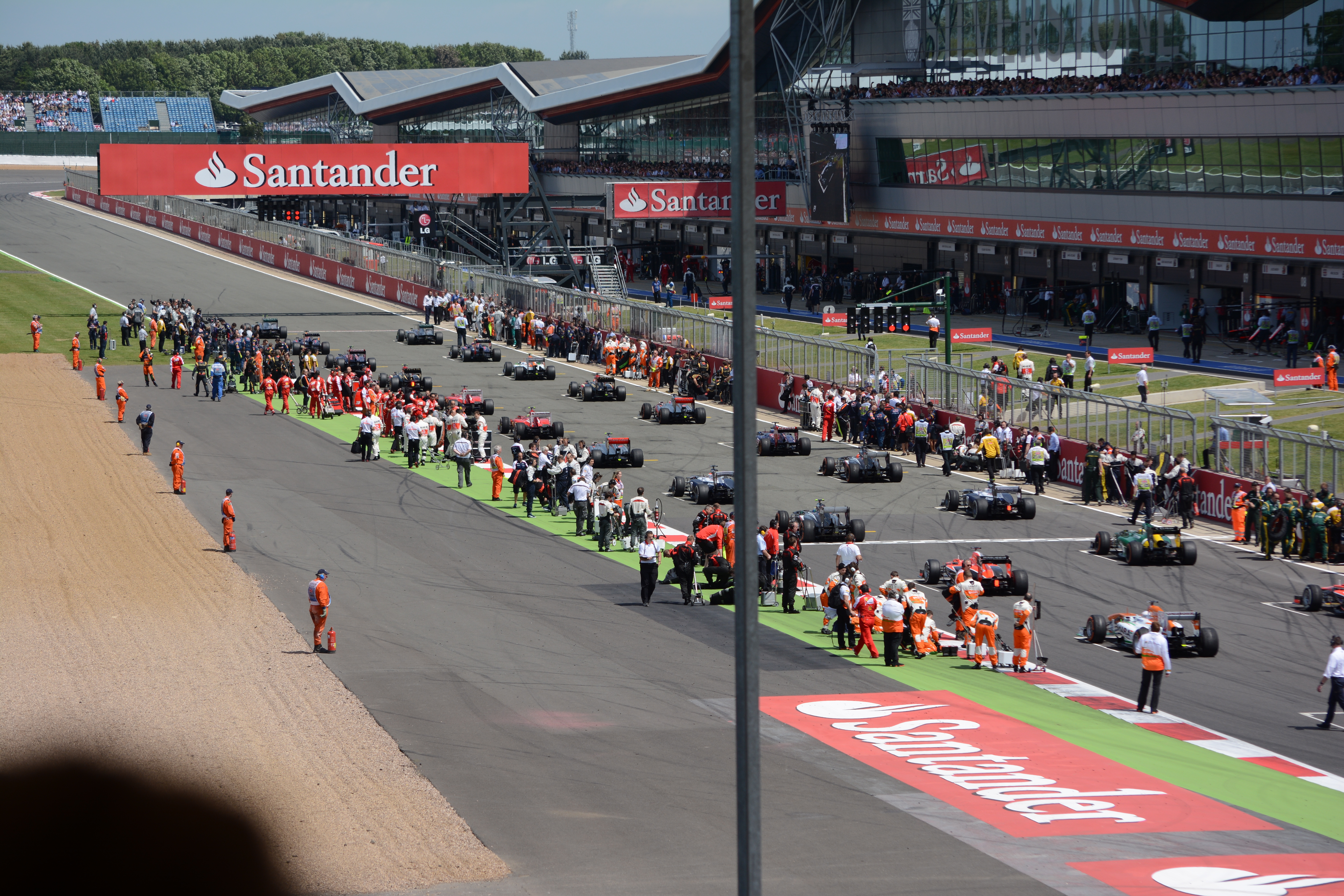
The grid lining up for the formation lap

The 52-lap race took place in the afternoon of 30 June from 14:00 local time. The weather at the start was clear with the air temperature between 21 and 22 °C (70 and 72 °F) and a track temperature from 29 to 34 °C (84 to 93 °F); a gusty wind was present, and no rain was forecast. 120,000 attended the event. The first nine starters began on the medium compound tyres. The optimum strategy was for a driver to make three pit stops because it was faster and not be impeded by slower traffic. Hamilton made a brisk start to lead the field into the first corner. Vettel overtook the slow-starting Rosberg for second. Webber and Grosjean made contact through Abbey corner, damaging the former's carbon fibre front wing, and driving onto the run-off area and fell to 14th position.

Sutil progressed from sixth to fourth place, and Massa moved through traffic to go from 11th to fifth. Driving towards Stowe turn, Alonso overtook Button on the inside for ninth. Hamilton led Vettel by eight-tenths of a second by the end of the first lap, with Rosberg third and Sutil fourth. Hamilton began to pull away from Vettel, his car was faster all round the track. Alonso discovered his Ferrari was better in cooler weather because of a favourable car balance. He passed Grosjean for eighth at the exit of Woodcote corner at the start on lap two after Grosjean ran wide at turn three, the result of his contact with Webber. Hamilton was two seconds ahead of Vettel by lap five, preventing Vettel from using DRS and allowing Hamilton to react a pit stop without losing position. That same lap, Alonso switched lines in an unsuccessful attempt to pass Ricciardo into Stowe corner and Grosjean caught up to him. By lap seven, Webber had recovered from 14th to 11th.

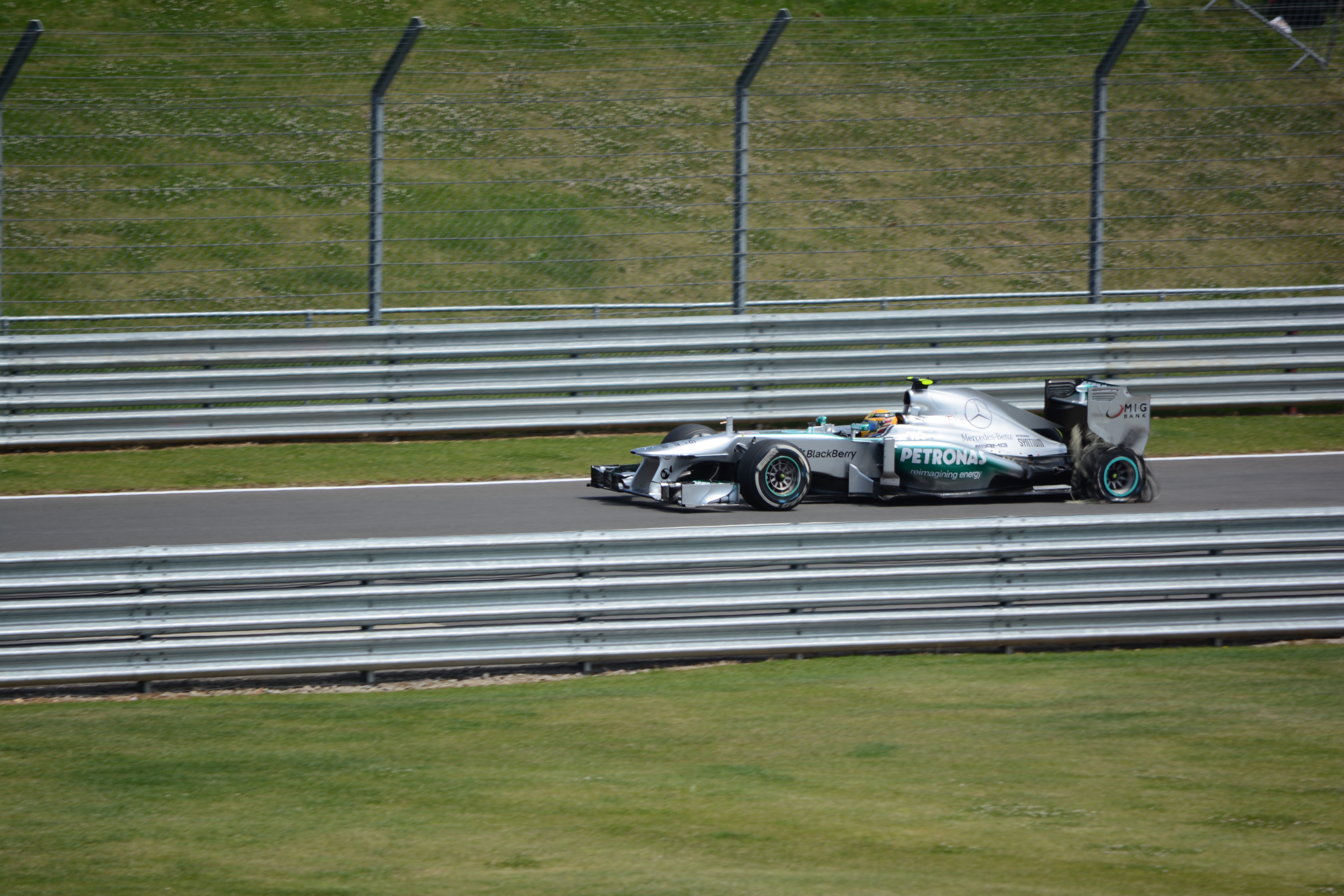
Lewis Hamilton driving into the pit lane on lap eight after sustaining a left-rear tyre failure while in first position

After exiting turn five on lap eight, Hamilton's rear left tyre punctured and rapidly deflated on the Wellington Straight. Tyre rubber flew off the wheel and littered the track as Vettel swerved to avoid hitting it and took over the lead. Hamilton drove slowly to the pit lane for a replacement wheel and checks to his car; the wheel's sidewall stayed intact and fibres flailed on it. He rejoined the race on the hard compound tyres in 22nd; yellow flags were waved to warn drivers about on-track debris. One lap later, Alonso exited Stowe corner with a punctured right-rear tyre that did not delaminate, causing him to enter the pit lane for the hard compound tyres, falling to 11th. His teammate Massa, in fourth, sustained the race's third tyre failure on lap ten when his left rear wheel deflated in Aintree corner, spinning onto the run-off area. Massa entered the pit lane cautiously for a new set of tyres and fell to 22nd. Because of debris on the Wellington Straight, DRS was disabled on lap 11, and it was around this point that FIA race director Charlie Whiting considered stopping the race but decided not to.

Pirelli technicians took the rear tyre rubber to their garage for analysis, advised teams to raise pressures to 24 psi (170 kPa) and told drivers to avoid mounting the kerbs. Between laps 12 and 13, Alonso overtook the Lotus duo of Räikkönen and Grosjean on the Hangar Straight and Vergne into Brooklands corner to move into sixth. Grosjean blocked his teammate Räikkönen from passing him at Maggots corner. Red Bull called Vettel into the pit lane for his first pit stop on the 13th lap and retained the lead. On lap 14, the Lotus team asked Grosjean to allow his teammate Räikkönen into sixth. As he did so on the Hangar Straight linking Stowe corner, Vergne's left-rear tyre failed at 180 mph (290 km/h) and littered debris on the circuit. A large piece of tyre landed on Räikkönen's helmet, without causing him injury. Vergne entered the pit lane to switch to a new set of hard compound tyres. This fourth tyre failure along with tyre debris on the circuit caused Whiting to deploy the safety car.

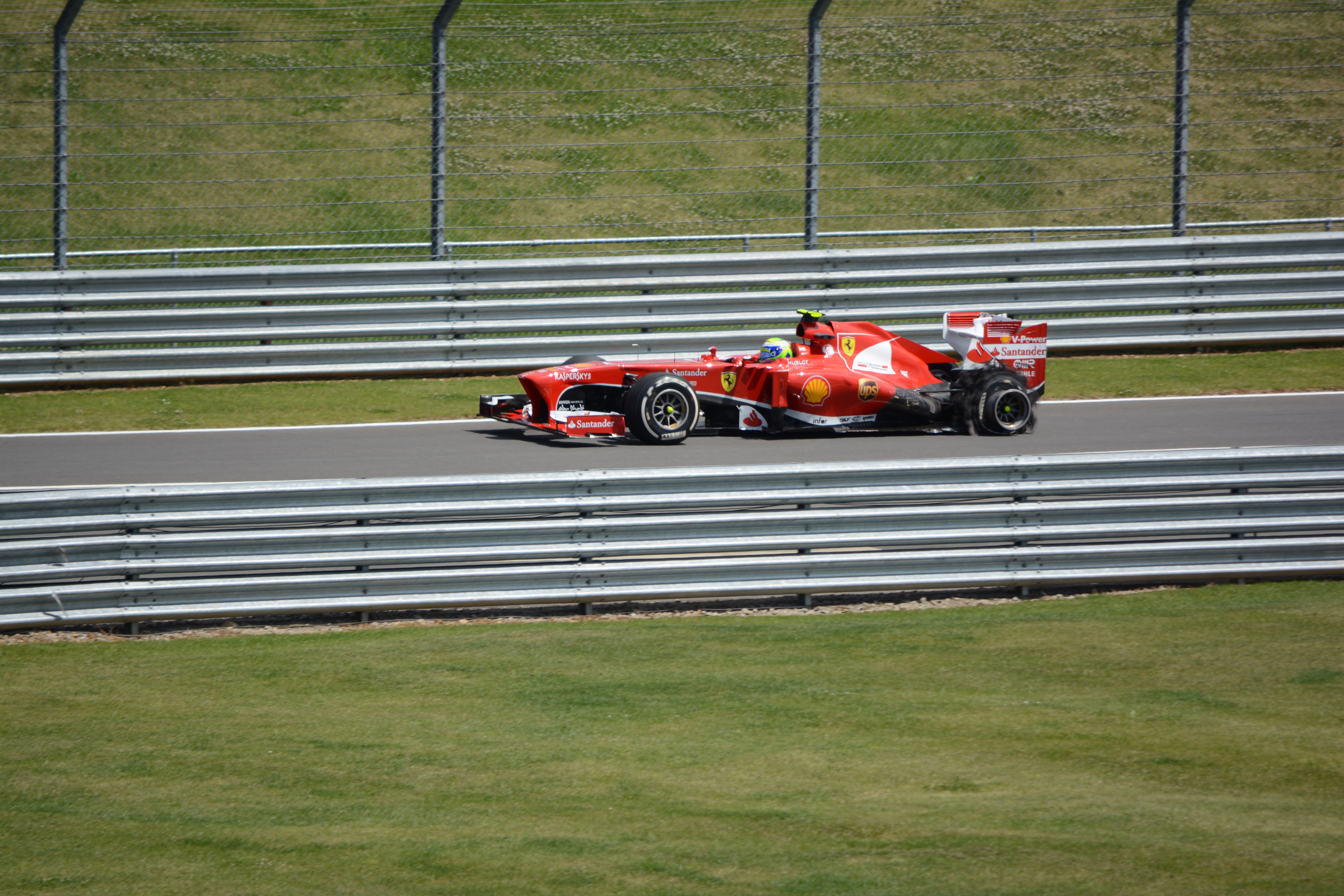
Felipe Massa on his way to the pit lane to replace a failed left-rear tyre

As track marshals checked and cleared on-track debris with road clearing trucks, Vettel was told by radio the inside of his left-rear medium compound tyre that he began the race on had sustained cuts to it. Teams sought to lessen the amount of time spent on their tyres when the switch to making three stops became common. The safety car was withdrawn at the end of the 21st lap, and racing resumed with Vettel leading Rosberg and Sutil. Pérez overtook Webber on the inside into Abbey corner for eighth. Webber, whose front wing was changed earlier, retook eighth from Pérez on the inside at Brooklands turn. On lap 28, Ricciardo turned left into the same turn and passed Grosjean for sixth place. Gutiérrez's front-left tyre was punctured from a cut on the Hangar Straight linking Stowe corner on lap 28. The tyre, which did not delaminate, damaged his front wing, and left carbon fibre debris on the track. Alonso, who was close by Sutil, swerved to avoid the debris. On that lap, Webber overtook Grosjean into Brooklands corner for seventh.

The second round of pit stops commenced on the 30th lap. Räikkönen, Grosjean and Alonso were the first of the leaders to enter the pit lane for the hard compound tyres. As he was released, Alonso was forced to brake to avoid hitting Grosjean's car as he entered his pit stall, allowing Räikkönen past him. Over laps 31 and 32, Hamilton attempted two unsuccessful passes on Di Resta on the main straight and into Brooklands corner. Sutil and Rosberg made their second pit stops for the hard compound tyres over laps 33 and 34. On lap 35, Webber used DRS on the Hangar Straight into Stowe corner to pass Alonso for fourth position. Vettel made his second pit stop from the lead on the same lap for hard compound tyres. He retained the lead. On the 36th lap, Di Resta and Hülkenberg made contact in turn three, damaging the former's front wing. After Hamilton exited the pit lane on the next lap, Di Resta passed him. Hamilton attempted to pass Di Resta again before Stowe corner. Instead, he narrowly avoided a rearward collision with the rear of Di Resta's car on lap 37. That same lap, Toro Rosso retired Vergne in the pit lane with significant damage to his car.

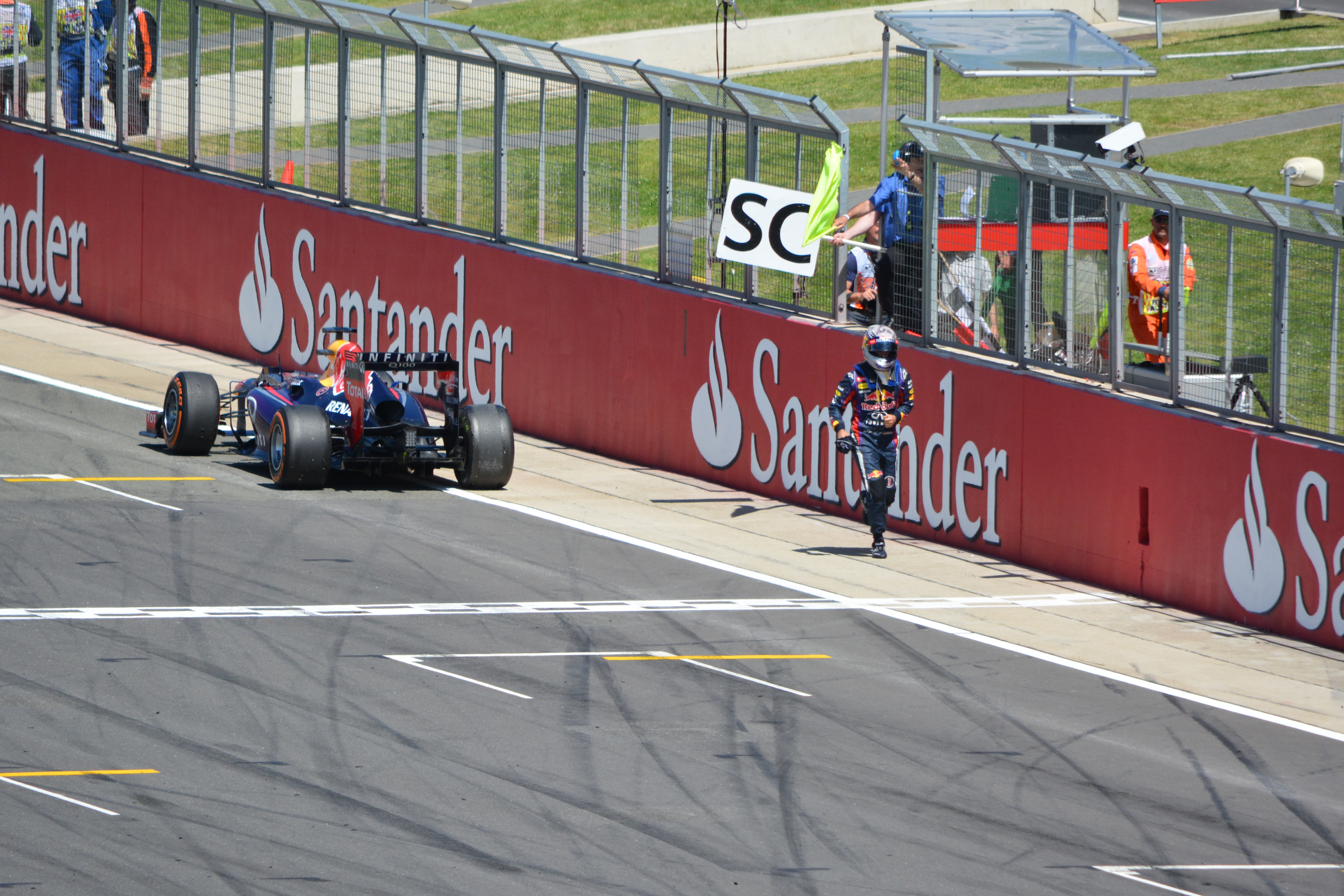
Sebastian Vettel retired from the lead of the race on the 41st lap with a gearbox failure.

Hamilton overtook Di Resta for 11th at the exit of turn three on the following lap. Button passed Grosjean into Brooklands corner for ninth on lap 39. Ricciardo attempted to pass Sutil into Copse corner for sixth but Sutil blocked him by switching lines, slowing Ricciardo. On lap 41, Hamilton used DRS to pass Grosjean on the Hangar Straight for tenth. On that lap, Vettel went to change to fifth gear into Vale corner when he lost drive. He drove slowly round Club turn and stopped at the side of the main straight next to pit wall to retire for the first time in 2013. This promoted Rosberg to the lead, Räikkönen to second and Webber to third. With Vettel's car deemed to be in a dangerous position, the safety car was deployed for the second time to allow his car to be moved safely from the track.

The safety car created a situation in which teams had to decide whether to make a pit stop to keep or gain position with nine laps to go. Rosberg and Webber made their stops at the end of lap 42 for the hard and medium tyres, respectively. Rosberg retained the lead as Webber fell to fifth. Räikkönen, Sutil and Ricciardo in positions two to four remained on the circuit. Rosberg was informed by radio of an issue with the centre of his left-rear tyre. Racing resumed at the conclusion of lap 45 when the safety car entered the pit lane. Webber overtook Ricciardo into Brooklands turn for fourth on lap 46, and Alonso passed Button for seventh into Copse turn. Entering the Hangar Straight, Alonso was slipstreaming Pérez at 179 mph (288 km/h) when Perez's left-rear tyre failed without warning and damaged his floor. Alonso turned right to avoid tyre debris from Pérez's car littering the track, as McLaren retired the latter in the pit lane.

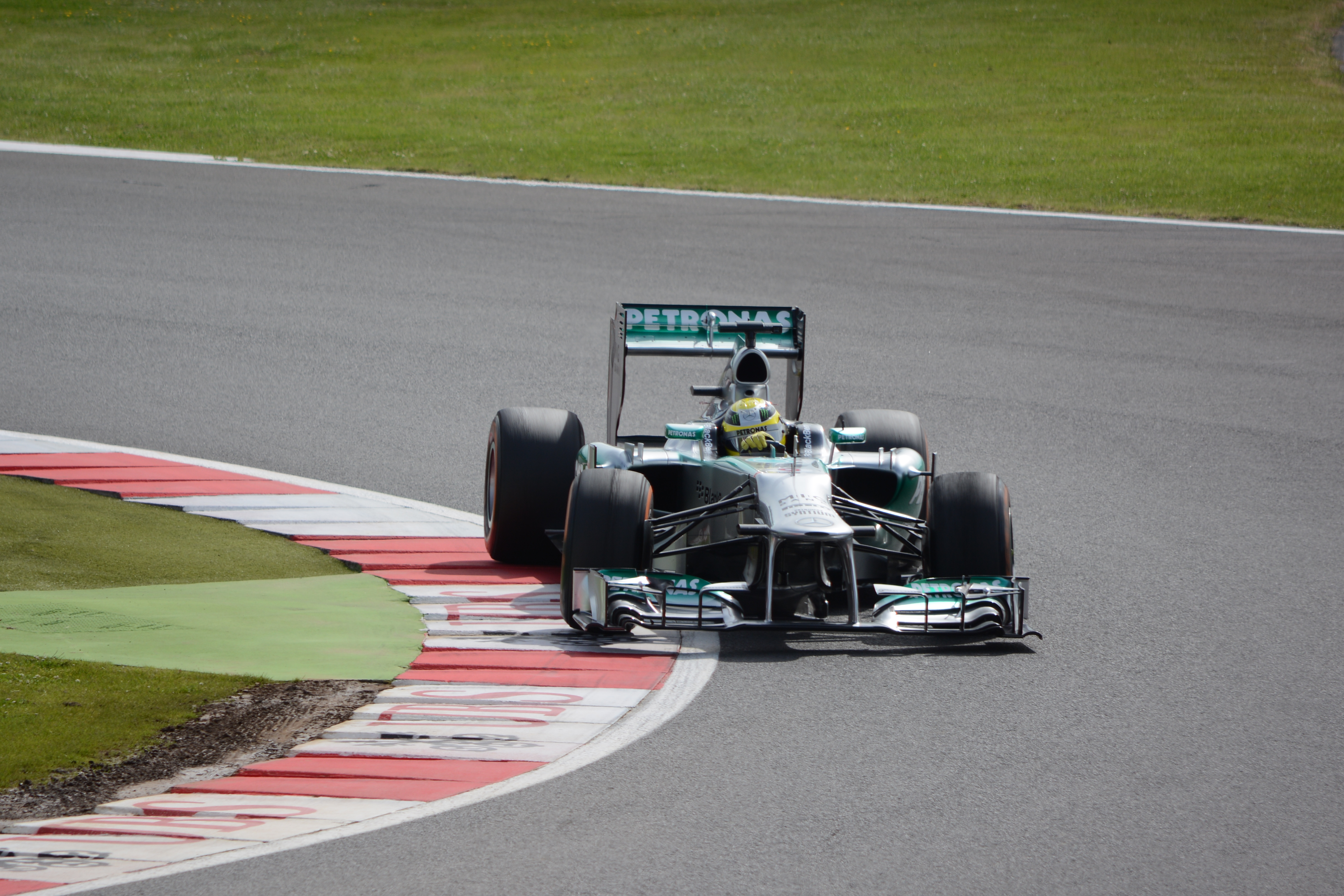
Nico Rosberg took the third victory of his career

On lap 47, Hamilton overtook Button for seventh and Webber deployed DRS to pass Sutil for third. Webber passed Räikkönen with DRS for second at Copse corner on the following lap, just as Ricciardo lost fourth to Alonso. On the 49th lap, Alonso and Hamilton demoted Sutil to fifth. Alonso had DRS available on lap 50 and used the extra grip in his tyres to pass Räikkönen for third. On the next lap, Hamilton used DRS to pass Räikkönen for fourth place. On the final lap, the Lotus team retired Grosjean in the pit lane because of front wing damage slowing him, just as Massa overtook Sutil for sixth. Rosberg held off Webber to take his second victory of the season and the third of his career, by seven-tenths of a second. Alonso took third, with Hamilton, Räikkönen, Massa, Sutil and Ricciardo in fourth to eighth. Di Resta was ninth after a late-race error, and Hülkenberg tenth after a slow puncture required him to make a pit stop earlier than scheduled. The final finishers were Maldonado, Bottas, Button, Gutiérrez, Pic, Bianchi, Chilton and Van Der Garde.

== Post-race ==
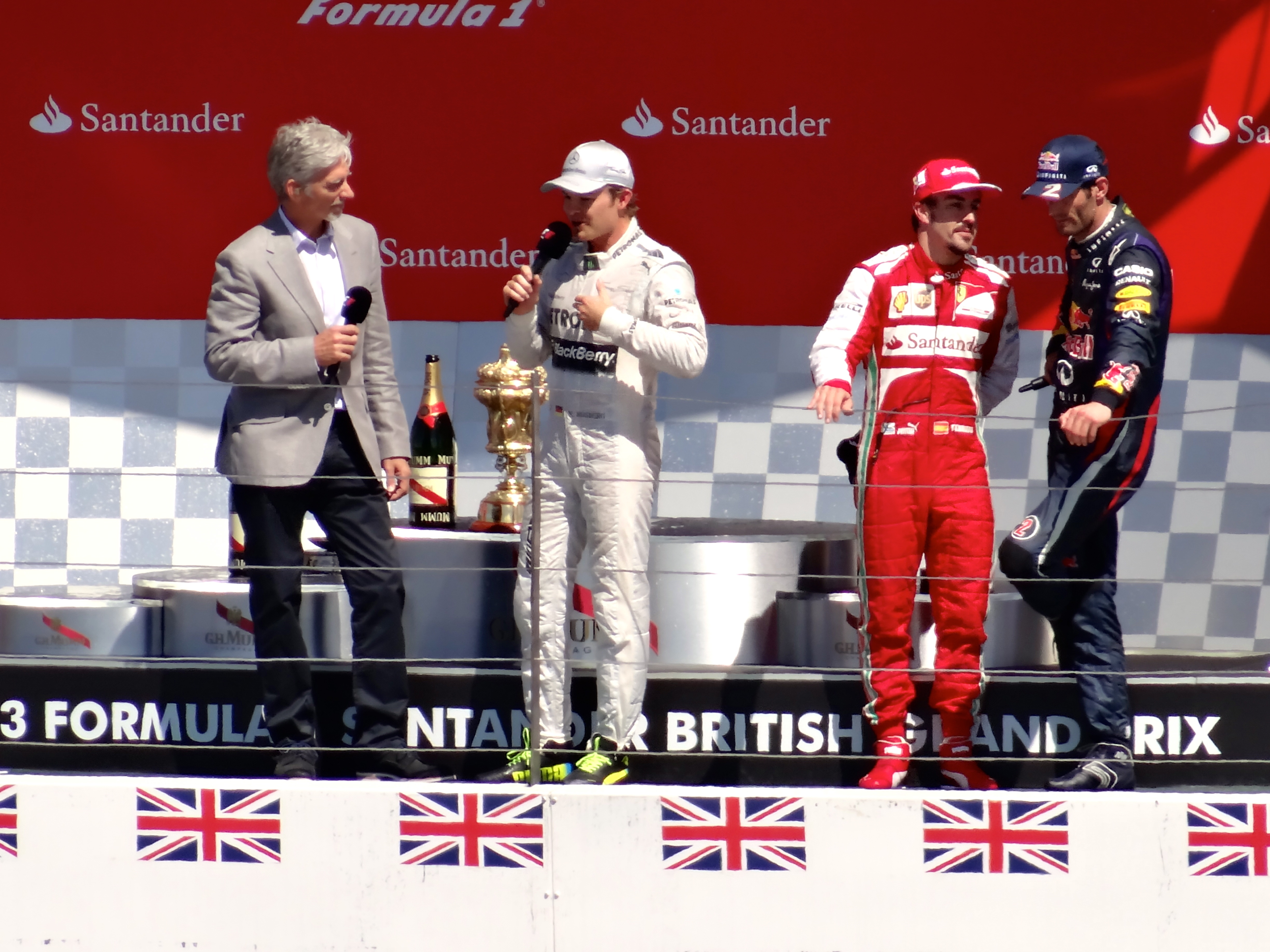
The post-race podium ceremony with the drivers interviewed by 1996 world champion Damon Hill

At the podium interviews, conducted by 1996 world champion Damon Hill, Rosberg called it "a very, very special day" because of the progress the Mercedes team had made over the season. Webber said his team would have to investigate his slow start to the race and would have preferred more laps to have a chance of winning it. Alonso said he felt it was a lucky race for his team due to the loss of position after making a pit stop during the second safety car period. In the post-race press conference, Rosberg said he would not been able to catch and pass Vettel had the latter not retired due to a lack of overall speed. Webber said he was happy with his own performance and was looking forward to the next round. Alonso called the finish "a fantastic result for our very difficult weekend" because his car was inconsistent during a meeting—slow in qualifying but fast in a race.

Rosberg was summoned to the stewards to explain a perceived non-compliance of rules for not slowing enough for waved yellow flags and not overtaking early in the race between turns three and five. They reviewed telemetry and broadcast footage and imposed a reprimand on Rosberg. Vettel was disappointed to lose a potential victory with his gearbox failing late in the race, saying: "These things unfortunately happen but fortunately we've got the next race coming up next week so we can try again." Räikkönen said his team Lotus had made a strategy error dropping him from second to fifth in the final laps: "It's three races now where we haven't had the result we maybe expect, but hopefully if we can have a bit more luck and also get rid of some of the mistakes we'll be able to get back to the front." The team's head of trackside operations Alan Permane confirmed they had made a strategy error. Di Resta believed his team Force India would be happy to finish ninth and Ricciardo saw his eighth-place finish as "a missed opportunity to score more points" due to the fast pace of his car.

Button on used, cold tyres said he was "a sitting duck" because he was vulnerable to being overtaken after the safety car was deployed: "I was just waiting for people to pass me. It was tough." The race result kept Vettel atop the World Drivers' Championship with 132 championship points. Alonso's third-place finish allowed him to close up to 21 championship points behind. Räikkönen maintained third position, Hamilton fourth, and Webber fifth. Red Bull maintained their lead in the World Constructors' Championship with 219 championship points. The championship points Mercedes had accrued at Silverstone allowed them to overtake Ferrari for second position. Lotus maintained fourth place and Force India were in fifth with 11 races of the season remaining.

=== Tyre concerns ===
The number of tyre failures during the race overshadowed Rosberg's victory. The press likened the situation to the 2005 United States Grand Prix, when seven teams running Michelin tyres were required to withdraw over safety concerns because their tyres were deemed unusable for racing, leaving six Bridgestone-shod cars to compete. A total of 20 tyre failures during the season caused the Grand Prix Drivers' Association to write a letter to Jean Todt, the FIA president, demanding action. Button, Vettel and Ferrari test driver Pedro de la Rosa met Todt to express their concerns to him.

After several drivers and senior Formula One personnel asked for further action to be taken and had raised their concerns to the media, Todt ordered tyre supplier Pirelli to be present at a meeting of the Sporting Working Committee with team principals at the Nürburgring on 3 July to propose new measures to prevent similar incidents from reoccurring in the long-term. He had already asked Pirelli Motorsport director Paul Hembery, racing manager Mario Isola and Whiting to attend a meeting in the Silverstone paddock on the night after the race. Pirelli agreed to increase the strength of its tyres by changing the internal belts material from steel to flexible reinforced kevlar fibre to lessen the possibility of a puncture as a stop-gap solution for the following German Grand Prix. The company received permission to introduce a new tyre featuring a combination of compound from 2012 and one from 2013 in time for the Hungarian Grand Prix. The FIA restricted the practice of changing the left- and right-hand tyres around and limited camber and tyre pressures.

At its headquarters in Milan, Pirelli conducted its own investigation into the tyre failures observed during the race. The company concluded the failures were caused by incorrectly mounted rear tyres to attempt to regulate wear, low enough pressures subjecting tyres to additional stress, extreme camber angles on the suspension of cars and aggressive high kerbs. Pirelli emphasised the practice of incorrectly mounted tyres was not forbidden by the company but underestimated by all. It asked an FIA delegate to ensure teams did not under-inflate tyres and add excess camber angles on all cars.

=== Race classification ===
Drivers who scored championship points are denoted in bold.

Pos.	No.	Driver	Constructor	Laps	Time/Retired	Grid	Points
1	9	(Germany) **Nico Rosberg**	**Mercedes**	52	1:32:59.456	2	25
2	2	(Australia) **Mark Webber**	**Red Bull-Renault**	52	+ 0.765	4	18
3	3	(Spain) **Fernando Alonso**	**Ferrari**	52	+ 7.124	9	15
4	10	(United Kingdom) **Lewis Hamilton**	**Mercedes**	52	+ 7.756	1	12
5	7	(Finland) **Kimi Räikkönen**	**Lotus-Renault**	52	+ 11.257	8	10
6	4	(Brazil) **Felipe Massa**	**Ferrari**	52	+ 14.573	11	8
7	15	(Germany) **Adrian Sutil**	**Force India-Mercedes**	52	+ 16.335	6	6
8	19	(Australia) **Daniel Ricciardo**	**Toro Rosso-Ferrari**	52	+ 16.543	5	4
9	14	(United Kingdom) **Paul di Resta**	**Force India-Mercedes**	52	+ 17.943	21	2
10	11	(Germany) **Nico Hülkenberg**	**Sauber-Ferrari**	52	+ 19.709	14	1
11	16	(Venezuela) Pastor Maldonado	Williams-Renault	52	+ 21.135	15	
12	17	(Finland) Valtteri Bottas	Williams-Renault	52	+ 25.094	16	
13	5	(United Kingdom) Jenson Button	McLaren-Mercedes	52	+ 25.969	10	
14	12	(Mexico) Esteban Gutiérrez	Sauber-Ferrari	52	+ 26.285	17	
15	20	(France) Charles Pic	Caterham-Renault	52	+ 31.613	18	
16	22	(France) Jules Bianchi	Marussia-Cosworth	52	+ 36.097	19	
17	23	(United Kingdom) Max Chilton	Marussia-Cosworth	52	+ 1:07.660	20	
18	21	(Netherlands) Giedo van der Garde	Caterham-Renault	52	+ 1:07.759	22	
19	8	(France) Romain Grosjean	Lotus-Renault	51	Handling	7	
20	6	(Mexico) Sergio Pérez	McLaren-Mercedes	46	Puncture Damage	13	
Ret	1	(Germany) Sebastian Vettel	Red Bull-Renault	41	Gearbox	3	
Ret	18	(France) Jean-Éric Vergne	Toro Rosso-Ferrari	35	Puncture Damage	12	

== Championship standings after the race ==
Drivers' Championship standings

+/–	Pos.	Driver	Points
	1	(Germany) Sebastian Vettel	132
	2	(Spain) Fernando Alonso	111
	3	(Finland) Kimi Räikkönen	98
	4	(United Kingdom) Lewis Hamilton	89
	5	(Australia) Mark Webber	87

Constructors' Championship standings

+/–	Pos.	Constructor	Points
	1	(Austria) Red Bull-Renault	219
1	2	(Germany) Mercedes	171
1	3	(Italy) Ferrari	168
	4	(United Kingdom) Lotus-Renault	124
	5	Force India-Mercedes	59
Sources:

- Note: Only the top five positions are included for both sets of standings.

== See also ==
- 2013 Silverstone GP2 Series round
- 2013 Silverstone GP3 Series round

== Footnotes ==
Previous race: 2013 Canadian Grand Prix	FIA Formula One World Championship; 2013 season	Next race: 2013 German Grand Prix
Previous race: 2012 British Grand Prix	British Grand Prix	Next race: 2014 British Grand Prix
