= 2013 German Grand Prix =

Race 9 of 19 in the 2013 Formula One World Championship
← Previous race	Next race →
- Layout of the Nürburgring "GP-Strecke" circuit

Race details
- Date: 7 July 2013
- Official name: Formula 1 Großer Preis Santander von Deutschland 2013
- Location: Nürburgring; Nürburg, Germany
- Course: Permanent racing facility
- Course length: 5.148 km (3.199 miles)
- Distance: 60 laps, 308.863 km (191.919 miles)
- Weather: Sunny
- Attendance: 44,000 (Race Day)

Pole position
Driver	(United Kingdom) Lewis Hamilton	Mercedes
- Time: 1:29.398

Fastest lap
Driver	(Spain) Fernando Alonso	Ferrari
- Time: 1:33.468 on lap 51

Podium
First	(Germany) Sebastian Vettel	Red Bull-Renault
Second	(Finland) Kimi Räikkönen	Lotus-Renault
Third	(France) Romain Grosjean	Lotus-Renault

The 2013 German Grand Prix (formally known as the Formula 1 Großer Preis Santander von Deutschland 2013) was a Formula One motor race that was held on 7 July 2013 at the Nürburgring in Nürburg, Germany, as the ninth round of the 2013 season.

It marked the 74th running of the German Grand Prix overall, and the 60th running of the German Grand Prix since 1950, when the racing series now known as the Formula One World Championship was created. This is the earliest a German Grand Prix has been held in a calendar year, followed by the 1926 and the 2009 editions of the race, though the 1996 European Grand Prix was held at the Nürburgring in late April.

The 60-lap race was won by local driver Sebastian Vettel, driving a Red Bull after starting from second position on the grid. This was the first and only home victory for the German driver. Kimi Räikkönen finished second for Lotus. Räikkönen's teammate Romain Grosjean finished third. A charging Fernando Alonso finished fourth and also set the fastest lap driving a Ferrari. Lewis Hamilton, who started from pole position driving a Mercedes, ended up finishing 5th, only a second ahead of his former teammate Jenson Button.

As a result of the race, Sebastian Vettel increased his championship lead to 34 points from Ferrari's Fernando Alonso. Kimi Räikkönen's second place moved him just 7 points behind Alonso in the standings. Lewis Hamilton remained fourth, while Mark Webber also remained in 5th spot. This was also Sergio Pérez's first points finish since Spain, and also for his teammate Jenson Button, since Monaco. This was the last Formula One Grand Prix to be held at the Nürburgring until the 2020 Eifel Grand Prix.

== Background ==
=== Tyre changes ===
In the aftermath of the British Grand Prix, in which four drivers experienced explosive punctures at some of the fastest points of the Silverstone Circuit, tyre supplier Pirelli announced plans to alter the structure of the tyres for the German Grand Prix, ahead of a more-permanent solution to be introduced at the next race in Hungary. The new tyres replaced the steel belts used in the rear wheels with Kevlar in order to lower the operating temperature by up to 10 °C (18 °F) and reduce the likelihood of explosive punctures. In addition to this, the Fédération Internationale de l'Automobile (FIA) banned the practice of swapping the left- and right-side tyres around on the cars, which teams had discovered increased the life expectancy of each tyre. Pirelli further lobbied to the FIA to make their recommendations for tyre pressure and camber settings to be made mandatory, after it was discovered that teams were deliberately using pressure and camber settings outside Pirelli's recommendations in order to maximise performance. This followed a similar incident at the 2011 Belgian Grand Prix, where teams used camber settings outside Pirelli's recommendations, which created blistering on the inside edge of the tyres as they experienced higher-than-normal operating temperatures.

== Report ==
=== Qualifying ===
==== Q1 ====
Felipe Massa was the fastest driver in Q1, ahead of Kimi Räikkönen's Lotus. The drivers eliminated in Q1, were Valtteri Bottas, Pastor Maldonado, Charles Pic, Jules Bianchi, Giedo van der Garde and Max Chilton.

==== Q2 ====
This session saw a rapid improvement in times in the closing stages which caught some teams out, such as Nico Rosberg being eliminated due to a mistake on the part of the Mercedes team and Mark Webber only barely making it into Q3 by five one-hundredths of a second Felipe Massa was fastest again ahead of Kimi Räikkönen again as well. Jean-Éric Vergne was eliminated, as well as Adrian Sutil, Esteban Gutiérrez, Sergio Pérez and Paul di Resta.

==== Q3 ====
Lewis Hamilton took pole position with Sebastian Vettel and Mark Webber in second and third, respectively. Kimi Räikkönen and Romain Grosjean qualified 4th and 5th. Alonso qualified 8th behind his teammate Felipe Massa and both opted to start the race on the medium tyre. Daniel Ricciardo managed to qualify on the 3rd row for the second race in succession. Jenson Button and Nico Hülkenberg elected not to set a time, saving their tyres for the race.

=== Race ===
Both Webber and Vettel had strong starts applying immediate pressure to Hamilton. Hamilton responded by trying to push Vettel off the racing line on the inside of the track which then opened the door for Webber to try to make a move on the outside, but by the end of turn one Vettel had managed to shake off Hamilton and take the race lead, with Webber moving into second and Hamilton dropping down to third. Felipe Massa also had a good start, gaining a few places. Alonso fell back slightly as did Hamilton and Daniel Ricciardo. Vettel kept the lead for the next few laps. Meanwhile, Massa, running in sixth place, went off the track at turn one on lap 3 after locking his rear brakes. The engine stalled and he retired from the race, caused by a gearbox failure. Nico Rosberg meanwhile, who had a disastrous qualifying, barely improved on his position in the first 5 laps.

From laps 5 to 9, drivers were pitting due to using worn softs from qualifying to switch to the medium compound tyres, with Grosjean and Räikkönen going longer than most drivers and also setting a very quick pace. Grosjean led the race before stopping on lap 13 and continued to show strong pace afterwards. Webber, on the other hand, pitted a lap later and had a serious incident with his rear-right wheel. The mechanics did not attach the wheel properly and as Webber left his pitbox, the wheel fell off and rolled down the pit lane. It hit and knocked over a cameraman, who was transported to a hospital in Koblenz where he was reported to have suffered broken bones and a concussion. Webber's Red Bull was pushed back to his pitbox where a new wheel was fitted and he rejoined the race, a lap behind Vettel. The two Lotuses had never lost touch with Vettel during the first half of the race and were keeping pace with him, with both Grosjean and Räikkönen setting fastest laps of the race.

On lap 23, Jules Bianchi's Marussia suffered an engine failure which resulted in a fire. He pulled to the left-hand side of the track but, unusually, his car rolled back across the track to the other side where it was stopped by an advertising board. This caused an instant safety car, which allowed Webber to get back on to the lead lap. Most of the drivers pitted for fresh tyres. Jean-Éric Vergne's Toro Rosso suffered a hydraulics failure less than two laps after Bianchi's engine failure, during the safety car period. He was able to return to the pits. His team-mate Daniel Ricciardo was struggling. He had qualified sixth but was slowly falling back into the field. Paul di Resta and Adrian Sutil of Force India also struggled during the first half of the race.

After the safety car period, Webber began to make his way through the field before becoming stuck behind the Sauber of Esteban Gutiérrez. He was unable to pass the Mexican for more than ten laps and pitted to try to get an advantage with fresh tyres and clean air. Meanwhile, the McLaren drivers were once again having a tussle, with Jenson Button getting past Sergio Pérez at turn one. Pastor Maldonado, driving in the 600th grand prix race for the Williams F1 Team, was in the points in eighth, along with his team-mate and rookie Valtteri Bottas in tenth. Räikkönen was leading on lap 41 after Vettel and Grosjean had pitted for the third time. Lotus waited until lap 49 to pit Räikkönen, switching him to the soft tyre, which left Vettel and Grosjean in first and second, with Alonso a threat from behind in fourth place. Grosjean was then told on the radio to not hold Räikkönen up, for championship title points reasons. It took a few laps for Räikkönen to pass Grosjean and afterwards he attempted to chase down Vettel. Alonso set the fastest lap of the race, almost a second faster than the first three drivers, and was rapidly catching Grosjean. Meanwhile, Hamilton made a move on his former team-mate Button at turn two, moving into fifth. Webber then made a move on Pérez to go into seventh.

Räikkönen was unable to catch Vettel, who took the victory. It was his first victory at his home race and the first victory he gained in his birthday month, July. It was also his 30th career victory, becoming the 6th driver to achieve such a feat and in just his 110th start. Räikkönen finished just one second behind, with Grosjean only just holding off Alonso for third place, the latter having used too much of his soft tyres while closing down the gap to Grosjean. The podium placings were the same as at the 2012 and the 2013 Bahrain Grand Prix. Hamilton, Button, Webber and Pérez remained fifth, sixth, seventh and eighth respectively. Rosberg, struggling to keep his Mercedes on the pace, finished ninth at his home race while Nico Hülkenberg took the final point for Sauber. di Resta finished eleventh, the first time he had finished outside the points during the season, with Ricciardo in twelfth, Adrian Sutil in thirteenth and Gutiérrez in fourteenth. Williams had a poor ending to their milestone race, with Maldonado and Bottas finishing fifteenth and sixteenth respectively after wheel gun problems in their pitstops. Charles Pic, his team-mate Giedo van der Garde and Max Chilton were the final finishers.

=== Post race ===
After the race Red Bull and Force India were given fines for incidents in the pits.

Red Bull were fined €30,000 after the right-rear tyre from Mark Webber's car became detached as the Australian left his pit box. The errant tyre subsequently bounced down the pit lane before striking FOM cameraman Paul Allen. Allen, who remained conscious after the incident, was treated at the circuit's medical centre before being helicoptered to Koblenz Hospital for observation.

Force India, meanwhile, were given a €5,000 fine after releasing Paul di Resta into the path of Toro Rosso's Jean-Éric Vergne.

== Classification ==
=== Qualifying ===
Pos.	No.	Driver	Constructor	Q1	Q2	Q3	Grid
1	10	(United Kingdom) Lewis Hamilton	Mercedes	1:31.131	1:30.152	1:29.398	1
2	1	(Germany) Sebastian Vettel	Red Bull-Renault	1:31.269	1:29.992	1:29.501	2
3	2	(Australia) Mark Webber	Red Bull-Renault	1:31.428	1:30.217	1:29.608	3
4	7	(Finland) Kimi Räikkönen	Lotus-Renault	1:30.676	1:29.852	1:29.892	4
5	8	(France) Romain Grosjean	Lotus-Renault	1:31.242	1:30.005	1:29.959	5
6	19	(Australia) Daniel Ricciardo	Toro Rosso-Ferrari	1:31.081	1:30.223	1:30.528	6
7	4	(Brazil) Felipe Massa	Ferrari	1:30.547	1:29.825	1:31.126	7
8	3	(Spain) Fernando Alonso	Ferrari	1:30.709	1:29.962	1:31.209	8
9	5	(United Kingdom) Jenson Button	McLaren-Mercedes	1:31.181	1:30.269	no time	9
10	11	(Germany) Nico Hülkenberg	Sauber-Ferrari	1:31.132	1:30.231	no time	10
11	9	(Germany) Nico Rosberg	Mercedes	1:31.322	1:30.326		11
12	14	(United Kingdom) Paul di Resta	Force India-Mercedes	1:31.322	1:30.697		12
13	6	(Mexico) Sergio Pérez	McLaren-Mercedes	1:31.498	1:30.933		13
14	12	(Mexico) Esteban Gutiérrez	Sauber-Ferrari	1:31.681	1:31.010		14
15	15	(Germany) Adrian Sutil	Force India-Mercedes	1:31.320	1:31.010		15
16	18	(France) Jean-Éric Vergne	Toro Rosso-Ferrari	1:31.629	1:31.104		16
17	17	(Finland) Valtteri Bottas	Williams-Renault	1:31.693			17
18	16	(Venezuela) Pastor Maldonado	Williams-Renault	1:31.707			18
19	20	(France) Charles Pic	Caterham-Renault	1:32.937			22^{1}
20	22	(France) Jules Bianchi	Marussia-Cosworth	1:33.063			19
21	21	(Netherlands) Giedo van der Garde	Caterham-Renault	1:33.734			20
22	23	(United Kingdom) Max Chilton	Marussia-Cosworth	1:34.098			21
107% time:1:36.885

- ^1 — Charles Pic was given a five-place grid penalty for an unscheduled gearbox change.

=== Race ===
Pos.	No.	Driver	Constructor	Laps	Time/Retired	Grid	Points
1	1	(Germany) Sebastian Vettel	Red Bull-Renault	60	1:41:14.711	2	25
2	7	(Finland) Kimi Räikkönen	Lotus-Renault	60	+1.008	4	18
3	8	(France) Romain Grosjean	Lotus-Renault	60	+5.830	5	15
4	3	(Spain) Fernando Alonso	Ferrari	60	+7.721	8	12
5	10	(United Kingdom) Lewis Hamilton	Mercedes	60	+26.927	1	10
6	5	(United Kingdom) Jenson Button	McLaren-Mercedes	60	+27.996	9	8
7	2	(Australia) Mark Webber	Red Bull-Renault	60	+37.562	3	6
8	6	(Mexico) Sergio Pérez	McLaren-Mercedes	60	+38.306	13	4
9	9	(Germany) Nico Rosberg	Mercedes	60	+46.821	11	2
10	11	(Germany) Nico Hülkenberg	Sauber-Ferrari	60	+49.892	10	1
11	14	(United Kingdom) Paul di Resta	Force India-Mercedes	60	+53.771	12	
12	19	(Australia) Daniel Ricciardo	Toro Rosso-Ferrari	60	+56.975	6	
13	15	(Germany) Adrian Sutil	Force India-Mercedes	60	+57.738	15	
14	12	(Mexico) Esteban Gutiérrez	Sauber-Ferrari	60	+1:00.160	14	
15	16	(Venezuela) Pastor Maldonado	Williams-Renault	60	+1:01.929	18	
16	17	(Finland) Valtteri Bottas	Williams-Renault	59	+1 lap	17	
17	20	(France) Charles Pic	Caterham-Renault	59	+1 lap	22	
18	21	(Netherlands) Giedo van der Garde	Caterham-Renault	59	+1 lap	20	
19	23	(United Kingdom) Max Chilton	Marussia-Cosworth	59	+1 lap	21	
Ret	18	(France) Jean-Éric Vergne	Toro Rosso-Ferrari	22	Hydraulics	16	
Ret	22	(France) Jules Bianchi	Marussia-Cosworth	21	Engine	19	
Ret	4	(Brazil) Felipe Massa	Ferrari	3	Gearbox/Spun Off	7	

== Championship standings after the race ==
Drivers' Championship standings

Pos.	Driver	Points
1	(Germany) Sebastian Vettel	157
2	(Spain) Fernando Alonso	123
3	(Finland) Kimi Räikkönen	116
4	(United Kingdom) Lewis Hamilton	99
5	(Australia) Mark Webber	93

Constructors' Championship standings

Pos.	Constructor	Points
1	(Austria) Red Bull-Renault	250
2	(Germany) Mercedes	183
3	(Italy) Ferrari	180
4	(United Kingdom) Lotus-Renault	157
5	Force India-Mercedes	59

- Note: Only the top five positions are included for both sets of standings.

== See also ==
- 2013 Nürburgring GP2 Series round
- 2013 Nürburgring GP3 Series round

Previous race: 2013 British Grand Prix	FIA Formula One World Championship; 2013 season	Next race: 2013 Hungarian Grand Prix
Previous race: 2012 German Grand Prix	German Grand Prix	Next race: 2014 German Grand Prix; Next race at the Nürburgring: 2020 Eifel Grand Prix
