= Force India VJM05 =

2012 Formula One racing car

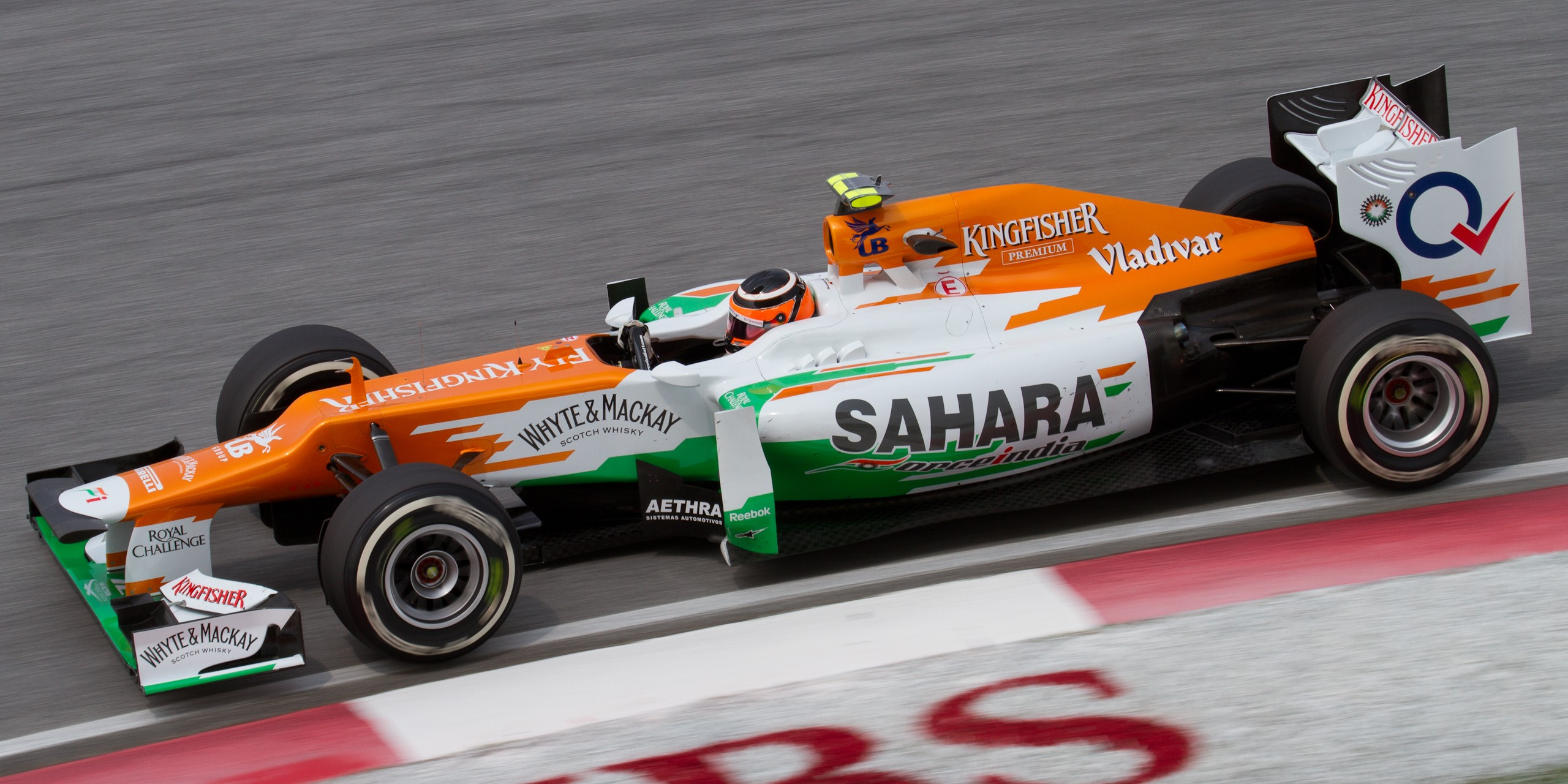
- Nico Hülkenberg driving the VJM05 during the Malaysian Grand Prix
- Category: Formula One
- Constructor: Force India
- Designers: Andrew Green (Technical Director); Simon Phillips (Aerodynamics Director); Akio Haga (Chief Designer); Bruce Eddington (Head of Design, Composites); Daniel Carpenter (Head of Design, Mechanical); Simon Gardner (Head of R&D); James Knapton (Head of Vehicle Science); Simon Belcher (Chief Aerodynamicist)
- Predecessor: Force India VJM04
- Successor: Force India VJM06

Technical specifications
- Chassis: Carbon fibre composite monocoque with Zylon legality side anti-intrusion panels.
- Suspension (front): Aluminium uprights with carbon fibre composite wishbones, trackrod and pushrod. Inboard chassis mounted torsion springs, dampers and anti-roll bar assembly.
- Suspension (rear): Aluminium uprights with carbon fibre composite wishbones, trackrod and pullrod. Inboard gearbox mounted torsion springs, dampers and anti-roll bar assembly.
- Engine: Mercedes-Benz FO 108Z 2.4 L (146 cu in) V8 (90°). Naturally aspirated, 18,000 RPM limited with KERS, mid-mounted
- Transmission: McLaren gearbox Seven-speed plus one reverse gear hand-operated, seamless shift
- Weight: 640 kg (1,411 lb) (including driver)
- Fuel: Mobil
- Tyres: Pirelli P Zero (dry), Cinturato (wet); BBS Wheels (front and rear): 13"

Competition history
- Notable entrants: Sahara Force India F1 Team
- Notable drivers: 11. (United Kingdom) Paul di Resta; 12. (Germany) Nico Hülkenberg
- Debut: 2012 Australian Grand Prix
- Last event: 2012 Brazilian Grand Prix
| Races | Wins | Podiums | Poles | F/Laps |
|---|---|---|---|---|
| 20 | 0 | 0 | 0 | 1 |

The Force India VJM05 is a Formula One racing car designed by Sahara Force India F1 Team for use in the 2012 Formula One season. The car was launched on 3 February at Silverstone. It was driven by Paul di Resta, and Nico Hülkenberg who returned to the sport after spending one year as Force India's test and reserve driver.

== Season summary ==
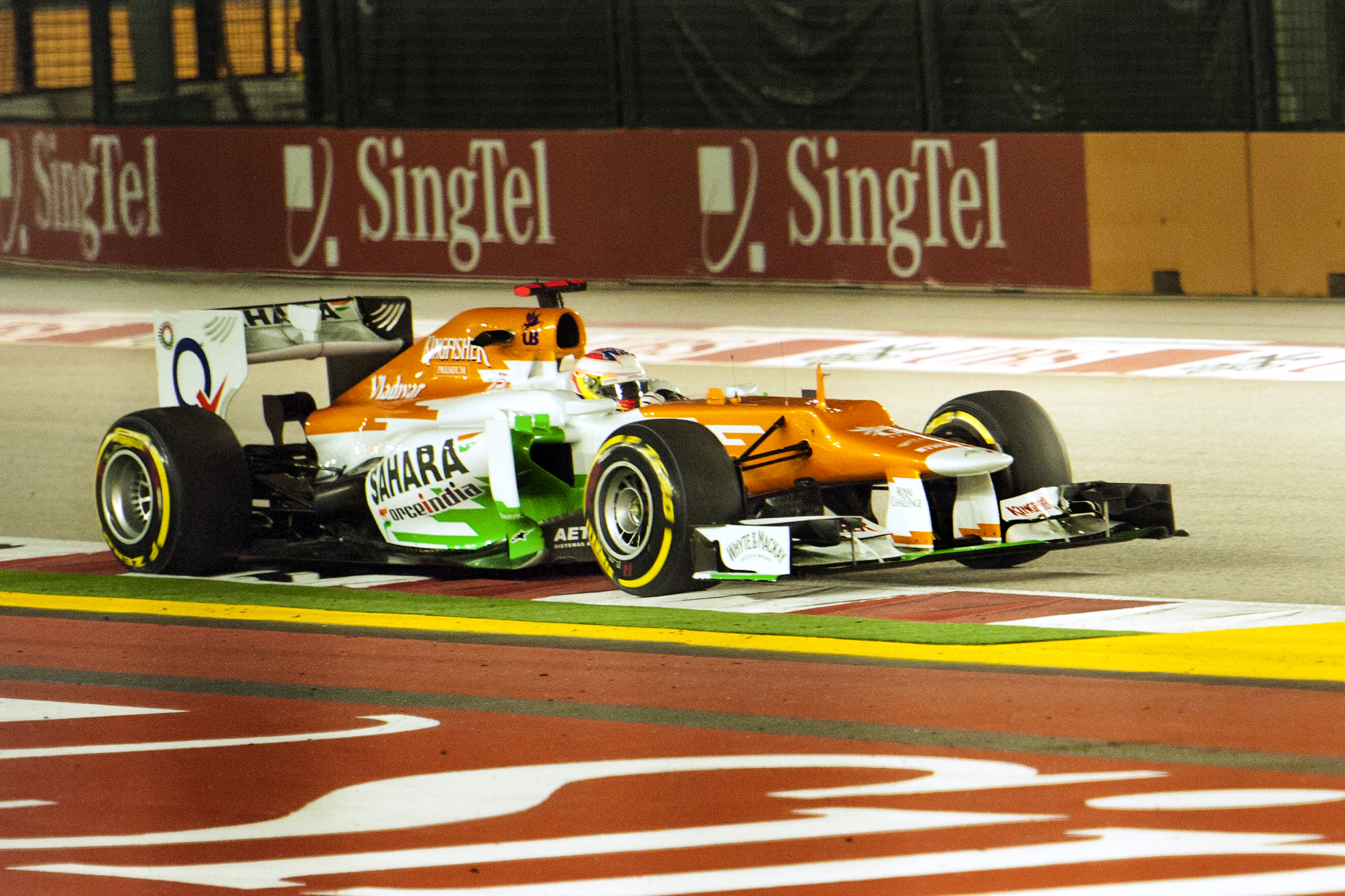
Di Resta took fourth place in Singapore

Albeit finishing lower than 2011, Force India ended up scoring more points compared to the previous year. Hülkenberg and Di Resta achieved their best finishing positions with fourth-places at Belgian Grand Prix and Singapore Grand Prix, respectively.

== Sponsorship and livery ==
The VJM05 underwent livery changes; the colours were flipped over and the graphics were redesigned from its three predecessors. The team signed a deal with Sahara India Pariwar as a title sponsor, retaining sponsors including Whyte & Mackay and Kingfisher. Medion left the team, prior to Sutil's departure. It would not return until he rejoined the team the following season.

At the Abu Dhabi Grand Prix, Whyte & Mackay was replaced with a contest winner's name of the alcohol brand, Wendy & Keith Murray.

== Complete Formula One results ==
(key) (results in bold indicate pole position; results in italics indicate fastest lap)

| Year | Entrant | Engine | Tyres | Drivers | 1 | 2 | 3 | 4 | 5 | 6 | 7 | 8 | 9 | 10 | 11 | 12 | 13 | 14 | 15 | 16 | 17 | 18 | 19 | 20 | Points | WCC |
|---|---|---|---|---|---|---|---|---|---|---|---|---|---|---|---|---|---|---|---|---|---|---|---|---|---|---|
| 2012 | Force India | Mercedes-Benz FO 108Z | **P** | | AUS | MAL | CHN | BHR | ESP | MON | CAN | EUR | GBR | GER | HUN | BEL | ITA | SIN | JPN | KOR | IND | ABU | USA | BRA | 109 | 7th |
| 2012 | Force India | Mercedes-Benz FO 108Z | **P** | Paul di Resta | 10 | 7 | 12 | 6 | 14 | 7 | 11 | 7 | Ret | 11 | 12 | 10 | 8 | 4 | 12 | 12 | 12 | 9 | 15 | 19^{†} | 109 | 7th |
| 2012 | Force India | Mercedes-Benz FO 108Z | **P** | Nico Hülkenberg | Ret | 9 | 15 | 12 | 10 | 8 | 12 | 5 | 12 | 9 | 11 | 4 | 21^{†} | 14 | 7 | 6 | 8 | Ret | 8 | 5 | 109 | 7th |

^{†} Driver failed to finish the race, but was classified as they had completed greater than 90% of the race distance.
