= 2013 Canadian Grand Prix =

2013 Formula One race held in Montreal, Canada

Race 7 of 19 in the 2013 Formula One World Championship
← Previous race	Next race →
- Circuit Gilles Villeneuve

Race details
- Date: 9 June 2013
- Official name: Formula 1 Grand Prix du Canada 2013
- Location: Circuit Gilles Villeneuve; Montreal, Quebec, Canada
- Course: Street circuit
- Course length: 4.361 km (2.710 miles)
- Distance: 70 laps, 305.270 km (189.686 miles)
- Weather: Mild with temperatures approaching 23 °C (73 °F); wind speeds up to 15 kilometres per hour (9.3 mph)

Pole position
Driver	(Germany) Sebastian Vettel	Red Bull-Renault
- Time: 1:25.425

Fastest lap
Driver	(Australia) Mark Webber	Red Bull-Renault
- Time: 1:16.182 on lap 69

Podium
First	(Germany) Sebastian Vettel	Red Bull-Renault
Second	(Spain) Fernando Alonso	Ferrari
Third	(United Kingdom) Lewis Hamilton	Mercedes

The 2013 Canadian Grand Prix (formally known as the Formula 1 Grand Prix du Canada 2013) was a Formula One motor race that took place on 9 June 2013 at the Circuit Gilles Villeneuve in Montreal, Quebec, Canada. The race was the seventh round of the 2013 season, and marked the 50th running of the Canadian Grand Prix.

After taking pole position, Sebastian Vettel took his and Red Bull's first victory at the Canadian Grand Prix, just over 14 seconds ahead of second-placed Fernando Alonso.

The event was marred by the death of track marshal Mark Robinson, who was run over by a recovery vehicle. The accident happened while marshals were removing the Sauber of Esteban Gutiérrez after the Mexican had spun off during the closing stages of the race. Robinson died later in hospital, and became the first trackside death in Formula One since that of marshal Graham Beveridge at the 2001 Australian Grand Prix.

== Report ==
=== Background ===
Tyre supplier Pirelli brought its white-banded medium compound tyre as the harder "prime" tyre and the red-banded supersoft compound tyre as the softer "option" tyre, as opposed to the previous year where soft and supersoft selection were provided.

=== Qualifying ===
The three qualifying sessions were held on 8 June. All qualifying was rain-affected.

==== Q1 ====
Force India's Paul di Resta, Caterham's Charles Pic, Lotus's Romain Grosjean, Marussia's Jules Bianchi and Max Chilton, and Caterham's Giedo van der Garde were all knocked out in Q1.

==== Q2 ====
Sauber's Nico Hülkenberg, McLaren's Sergio Pérez, Williams' Pastor Maldonado, McLaren's Jenson Button, Sauber's Esteban Gutiérrez, and Ferrari's Felipe Massa were all eliminated in Q2. Massa caused a red flag after crashing into the barriers in turn 3. Williams' Valtteri Bottas became the first rookie driver in 2013 to make it into Q3.

==== Q3 ====
Red Bull's Sebastian Vettel took pole position for the Canadian Grand Prix with a time of 1:25.425, beating Mercedes' Lewis Hamilton by 0.087 seconds. Williams' Valtteri Bottas was a surprise third. At the time, Williams hadn't scored a single point in their 2013 season.

Kimi Räikkönen and Daniel Ricciardo were given two-place penalties for not lining up in the designated 'fast lane' at the pit exit in the rush to get out after the Q2 red flag. Räikkönen would start from 10th and Ricciardo 11th on the grid.

=== Race ===
Vettel led away at the start with Hamilton trailing in his wake; in turn, Hamilton held off his teammate Nico Rosberg; behind them were Mark Webber and Fernando Alonso. At the first round of pit stops, Mercedes chose to fit super-softs to Lewis Hamilton while Webber and Alonso fitted the more durable medium tyres, and they soon caught and passed Hamilton. However, Webber then damaged his car when lapping the Caterham of Giedo van der Garde; the latter was given a 10-second stop-and-go penalty. Webber continued but was then passed by Alonso. After the second round of pit stops, Alonso was again behind Lewis Hamilton, but on Lap 63 he passed the Mercedes driver to claim 2nd behind a dominant Vettel; Hamilton held onto 3rd place. Near the end of the race, Esteban Gutiérrez spun off and track worker Mark Robinson, who had fallen over trying to pick up a radio he dropped, was run over by the recovery vehicle. He later died from his injuries in hospital; several drivers led tributes to the track worker on Twitter.

== Classification ==
=== Qualifying ===
Pos.	No.	Driver	Constructor	Q1	Q2	Q3	Grid
1	1	(Germany) Sebastian Vettel	Red Bull-Renault	1:22.318	1:28.166	1:25.425	1
2	10	(United Kingdom) Lewis Hamilton	Mercedes	1:23.801	1:27.649	1:25.512	2
3	17	(Finland) Valtteri Bottas	Williams-Renault	1:23.446	1:28.419	1:25.897	3
4	9	(Germany) Nico Rosberg	Mercedes	1:23.840	1:28.420	1:26.008	4
5	2	(Australia) Mark Webber	Red Bull-Renault	1:23.247	1:28.145	1:26.208	5
6	3	(Spain) Fernando Alonso	Ferrari	1:23.224	1:28.788	1:26.504	6
7	18	(France) Jean-Éric Vergne	Toro Rosso-Ferrari	1:24.159	1:28.527	1:26.543	7
8	15	(Germany) Adrian Sutil	Force India-Mercedes	1:24.551	1:28.799	1:27.348	8
9	7	(Finland) Kimi Räikkönen	Lotus-Renault	1:24.451	1:28.667	1:27.432	10^{1}
10	19	(Australia) Daniel Ricciardo	Toro Rosso-Ferrari	1:24.770	1:29.359	1:27.946	11^{1}
11	11	(Germany) Nico Hülkenberg	Sauber-Ferrari	1:23.899	1:29.435		9
12	6	(Mexico) Sergio Pérez	McLaren-Mercedes	1:24.176	1:29.761		12
13	16	(Venezuela) Pastor Maldonado	Williams-Renault	1:24.776	1:29.917		13
14	5	(United Kingdom) Jenson Button	McLaren-Mercedes	1:24.021	1:30.068		14
15	12	(Mexico) Esteban Gutiérrez	Sauber-Ferrari	1:24.408	1:30.315		15
16	4	(Brazil) Felipe Massa	Ferrari	1:23.735	1:30.354		16
17	14	(United Kingdom) Paul di Resta	Force India-Mercedes	1:24.908			17
18	20	(France) Charles Pic	Caterham-Renault	1:25.626			18
19	8	(France) Romain Grosjean	Lotus-Renault	1:25.716			22^{2}
20	22	(France) Jules Bianchi	Marussia-Cosworth	1:26.508			19
21	23	(United Kingdom) Max Chilton	Marussia-Cosworth	1:27.062			20
22	21	(Netherlands) Giedo van der Garde	Caterham-Renault	1:27.110			21
107% time:1:28.080

- ^1 — Kimi Räikkönen and Daniel Ricciardo were each given a two-place grid penalty for failing to queue in the fast lane at the resumption on the second qualifying session.
- ^2 — Romain Grosjean was given a ten-place grid penalty for causing an avoidable accident in the previous race.

=== Race ===
Pos.	No.	Driver	Constructor	Laps	Time/Retired	Grid	Points
1	1	(Germany) Sebastian Vettel	Red Bull-Renault	70	1:32:09.143	1	25
2	3	(Spain) Fernando Alonso	Ferrari	70	+14.408	6	18
3	10	(United Kingdom) Lewis Hamilton	Mercedes	70	+15.942	2	15
4	2	(Australia) Mark Webber	Red Bull-Renault	70	+25.731	5	12
5	9	(Germany) Nico Rosberg	Mercedes	70	+1:09.725	4	10
6	18	(France) Jean-Éric Vergne	Toro Rosso-Ferrari	69	+1 lap	7	8
7	14	(United Kingdom) Paul di Resta	Force India-Mercedes	69	+1 lap	17	6
8	4	(Brazil) Felipe Massa	Ferrari	69	+1 lap	16	4
9	7	(Finland) Kimi Räikkönen	Lotus-Renault	69	+1 lap	10	2
10	15	(Germany) Adrian Sutil	Force India-Mercedes	69	+1 lap	8	1
11	6	(Mexico) Sergio Pérez	McLaren-Mercedes	69	+1 lap	12	
12	5	(United Kingdom) Jenson Button	McLaren-Mercedes	69	+1 lap	14	
13	8	(France) Romain Grosjean	Lotus-Renault	69	+1 lap	22	
14	17	(Finland) Valtteri Bottas	Williams-Renault	69	+1 lap	3	
15	19	(Australia) Daniel Ricciardo	Toro Rosso-Ferrari	68	+2 laps	11	
16	16	(Venezuela) Pastor Maldonado	Williams-Renault	68	+2 laps	13	
17	22	(France) Jules Bianchi	Marussia-Cosworth	68	+2 laps	19	
18	20	(France) Charles Pic	Caterham-Renault	67	+3 laps	18	
19	23	(United Kingdom) Max Chilton	Marussia-Cosworth	67	+3 laps	20	
20^{3}	12	(Mexico) Esteban Gutiérrez	Sauber-Ferrari	63	Accident	15	
Ret	11	(Germany) Nico Hülkenberg	Sauber-Ferrari	45	Collision damage	9	
Ret	21	(Netherlands) Giedo van der Garde	Caterham-Renault	43	Collision damage	21	

- ^3 — Esteban Gutiérrez was classified despite retiring as he had completed 90% of the race distance.

== Championship standings after the race ==
Drivers' Championship standings

	Pos.	Driver	Points
	1	(Germany) Sebastian Vettel	132
1	2	(Spain) Fernando Alonso	96
1	3	(Finland) Kimi Räikkönen	88
	4	(United Kingdom) Lewis Hamilton	77
	5	(Australia) Mark Webber	69

Constructors' Championship standings

	Pos.	Constructor	Points
	1	(Austria) Red Bull-Renault	201
	2	(Italy) Ferrari	145
1	3	(Germany) Mercedes	134
1	4	(United Kingdom) Lotus-Renault	114
	5	Force India-Mercedes	51

Previous race: 2013 Monaco Grand Prix	FIA Formula One World Championship; 2013 season	Next race: 2013 British Grand Prix
Previous race: 2012 Canadian Grand Prix	Canadian Grand Prix	Next race: 2014 Canadian Grand Prix
