= 2013 Hungarian Grand Prix =

Race 10 of 19 in the 2013 Formula One World Championship
← Previous race	Next race →
- Hungaroring

Race details
- Date: 28 July 2013
- Official name: Formula 1 Magyar Nagydíj 2013
- Location: Hungaroring; Mogyoród, Hungary
- Course: Permanent racing facility
- Course length: 4.381 km (2.722 miles)
- Distance: 70 laps, 306.630 km (190.531 miles)
- Weather: Very hot and sunny, 35 °C.
- Attendance: 247,000 (Weekend) 99,000 (Race Day)

Pole position
Driver	(United Kingdom) Lewis Hamilton	Mercedes
- Time: 1:19.388

Fastest lap
Driver	(Australia) Mark Webber	Red Bull-Renault
- Time: 1:24.069 on lap 61

Podium
First	(United Kingdom) Lewis Hamilton	Mercedes
Second	(Finland) Kimi Räikkönen	Lotus-Renault
Third	(Germany) Sebastian Vettel	Red Bull-Renault

The 2013 Hungarian Grand Prix (formally known as the Formula 1 Magyar Nagydíj 2013) was a Formula One motor race which was held on 28 July 2013 at the Hungaroring in Mogyoród, Hungary. The race was the tenth round of the 2013 FIA Formula One World Championship, and marked the 29th running of the Hungarian Grand Prix, and the 28th time it had been held as a round of the World Championship.

The race, contested over 70 laps, was won by Lewis Hamilton after starting from pole position. It was his first win since joining Mercedes for 2013. Lotus driver Kimi Räikkönen finished second, and Sebastian Vettel finished third for Red Bull Racing. Despite being held in July, the race was the last of the season that was not won by Vettel. This was also Mercedes's last win until the 2014 Australian Grand Prix.

== Report ==
=== Background ===
Like the 2012 Hungarian Grand Prix, tyre supplier Pirelli brought its white-banded medium compound tyre as the harder "prime" tyre and the yellow-banded soft compound tyre as the softer "option" tyre.

=== Qualifying ===
==== Q1 ====
Eliminated in Q1 were Sauber's Gutierrez, Force India's di Resta, Caterham's Pic and Van der Garde and the Marussias of Bianchi and Chilton.

==== Q2 ====
Eliminated in Q2 were Force India's Sutil, Sauber's Hülkenberg, McLaren's Button, Toro Rosso's Vergne, and the Williams cars of Maldonado and Bottas.

==== Q3 ====
Mercedes' Lewis Hamilton took pole position with a time of 1:19.388 narrowly followed by Red Bull's Sebastian Vettel, and the Lotus of Romain Grosjean.

=== Race ===
Mercedes' Lewis Hamilton led from pole position ahead of Vettel and Grosjean. Rosberg and Massa touched on lap 1 and caused damage to Massa's car. Rosberg twice ran off the road during the first lap and lost several places, but suffered no damage. Hamilton made his first pit stop on lap 10 and that handed the race lead to Vettel. Hamilton came out just behind McLaren's Jenson Button, but was able to get past him quickly and this changed the dynamic of the race.

Vettel would pit and get stuck behind Button for several laps. Webber was the only leading driver to start on the harder compound tyres, giving him the lead after the first round of pit stops. However the harder tyres were to prove less durable than expected under the hot conditions, and he was eventually forced to make three stops. By lap 15 the running order was Webber, Hamilton, Button, Vettel, and Grosjean. Vettel tried to get past Button and damaged his front wing during one attempt. Vettel and Grosjean would eventually get past Button. Grosjean touched Button going into the chicane at Turn 6 and 7. Grosjean eventually passed Massa into Turn 4 but received a drive-through penalty for leaving the track during the overtake. Sutil suffered a hydraulic leak earlier on and his 100th Grand Prix was over. Shortly after Grosjean's penalty, Esteban Gutierrez who suffered an engine failure in FP3 and was eliminated from Q1 continued to have reliability issues and was wheeled back in the garage with transmission problems. Despite being a potential contender for points, his teammate Hülkenberg picked up a drive-through penalty for speeding in the pit lane. Valtteri Bottas retired after a smoky engine failure when the race leaders were on lap 45, which was his first retirement in Formula One, it was later confirmed of a hydraulic failure the cause of the smoke.

Hamilton retook the lead after the last round of stops ahead of Räikkönen, Vettel, and Webber. Rosberg retired late in the race with a fiery engine failure which lifted Maldonado and Williams into the points for the first time this season. Di Resta, Sutil's teammate also suffered hydraulic failure shortly before the end of the race.

Mercedes' Lewis Hamilton went on to win the 2013 Hungarian Grand Prix followed by Lotus' Kimi Räikkönen and Red Bull's Sebastian Vettel. Hamilton had thus won the Hungarian Grand Prix four times, in 2013, 2012, 2009, and 2007, and became tied with Michael Schumacher for the most wins in the Hungarian Grand Prix. He also became the first British driver to win in a Mercedes since Stirling Moss. This would prove to be the last non-Vettel win of 2013, as Vettel would go on to win the next nine races.

=== Post race ===
Romain Grosjean received a 20-second post-race penalty for hitting Jenson Button's McLaren while attempting to overtake him at the chicane during the race, but the penalty had no effect on the final standings as Button was more than 20 seconds behind him at the end of the race.

Ferrari was fined €15,000 when FIA's technical officials notified the race stewards after the race that Fernando Alonso had activated his DRS on three occasions during the race when not within one second of another car, as mandated by the regulations. The team was reported to not have switched the DRS enabling system from the pre-race setting to the race setting. As soon as the team became aware of the problem, they informed the driver to only use DRS when told to do so by the team. Stewards concluded that although Alonso gained a small advantage (less than a second), he also suffered a disadvantage by being unable to use DRS on every legitimate occasion. The team was still ultimately responsible for ensuring that the system conformed to the regulations.

== Classification ==
=== Qualifying ===
Pos.	No.	Driver	Constructor	Q1	Q2	Q3	Grid
1	10	(United Kingdom) Lewis Hamilton	Mercedes	1:20.363	1:19.862	1:19.388	1
2	1	(Germany) Sebastian Vettel	Red Bull-Renault	1:20.646	1:19.992	1:19.426	2
3	8	(France) Romain Grosjean	Lotus-Renault	1:20.447	1:20.101	1:19.595	3
4	9	(Germany) Nico Rosberg	Mercedes	1:20.350	1:19.778	1:19.720	4
5	3	(Spain) Fernando Alonso	Ferrari	1:20.652	1:20.183	1:19.791	5
6	7	(Finland) Kimi Räikkönen	Lotus-Renault	1:20.867	1:20.243	1:19.851	6
7	4	(Brazil) Felipe Massa	Ferrari	1:21.004	1:20.460	1:19.929	7
8	19	(Australia) Daniel Ricciardo	Toro Rosso-Ferrari	1:21.181	1:20.527	1:20.641	8
9	6	(Mexico) Sergio Pérez	McLaren-Mercedes	1:21.612	1:20.545	1:22.398	9
10	2	(Australia) Mark Webber	Red Bull-Renault	1:21.264	1:20.503	no time	10
11	15	(Germany) Adrian Sutil	Force India-Mercedes	1:21.471	1:20.569		11
12	11	(Germany) Nico Hülkenberg	Sauber-Ferrari	1:21.028	1:20.580		12
13	5	(United Kingdom) Jenson Button	McLaren-Mercedes	1:21.131	1:20.777		13
14	18	(France) Jean-Éric Vergne	Toro Rosso-Ferrari	1:21.345	1:21.029		14
15	16	(Venezuela) Pastor Maldonado	Williams-Renault	1:20.816	1:21.133		15
16	17	(Finland) Valtteri Bottas	Williams-Renault	1:21.135	1:21.219		16
17	12	(Mexico) Esteban Gutiérrez	Sauber-Ferrari	1:21.724			17
18	14	(United Kingdom) Paul di Resta	Force India-Mercedes	1:22.043			18
19	20	(France) Charles Pic	Caterham-Renault	1:23.007			19
20	21	(Netherlands) Giedo van der Garde	Caterham-Renault	1:23.333			20
21	22	(France) Jules Bianchi	Marussia-Cosworth	1:23.787			21
22	23	(United Kingdom) Max Chilton	Marussia-Cosworth	1:23.997			22
107% time:1:25.974

=== Race ===
Pos.	No.	Driver	Constructor	Laps	Time/Retired	Grid	Points
1	10	(United Kingdom) Lewis Hamilton	Mercedes	70	1:42:29.445	1	25
2	7	(Finland) Kimi Räikkönen	Lotus-Renault	70	+10.938	6	18
3	1	(Germany) Sebastian Vettel	Red Bull-Renault	70	+12.459	2	15
4	2	(Australia) Mark Webber	Red Bull-Renault	70	+18.044	10	12
5	3	(Spain) Fernando Alonso	Ferrari	70	+31.411	5	10
6	8	(France) Romain Grosjean	Lotus-Renault	70	+52.295^{1}	3	8
7	5	(United Kingdom) Jenson Button	McLaren-Mercedes	70	+53.819	13	6
8	4	(Brazil) Felipe Massa	Ferrari	70	+56.447	7	4
9	6	(Mexico) Sergio Pérez	McLaren-Mercedes	69	+1 Lap	9	2
10	16	(Venezuela) Pastor Maldonado	Williams-Renault	69	+1 Lap	15	1
11	11	(Germany) Nico Hülkenberg	Sauber-Ferrari	69	+1 Lap	12	
12	18	(France) Jean-Éric Vergne	Toro Rosso-Ferrari	69	+1 Lap	14	
13	19	(Australia) Daniel Ricciardo	Toro Rosso-Ferrari	69	+1 Lap	8	
14	21	(Netherlands) Giedo van der Garde	Caterham-Renault	68	+2 Laps	20	
15	20	(France) Charles Pic	Caterham-Renault	68	+2 Laps	19	
16	22	(France) Jules Bianchi	Marussia-Cosworth	67	+3 Laps	21	
17	23	(United Kingdom) Max Chilton	Marussia-Cosworth	67	+3 Laps	22	
18	14	(United Kingdom) Paul di Resta	Force India-Mercedes	66	Hydraulics	18	
19	9	(Germany) Nico Rosberg	Mercedes	64	Engine	4	
Ret	17	(Finland) Valtteri Bottas	Williams-Renault	42	Hydraulics	16	
Ret	12	(Mexico) Esteban Gutiérrez	Sauber-Ferrari	28	Transmission	17	
Ret	15	(Germany) Adrian Sutil	Force India-Mercedes	19	Hydraulics	11	

- ^1 — Romain Grosjean was given a 20-second post-race penalty in lieu of a drive-through penalty for hitting Jenson Button's McLaren during an overtake attempt. Grosjean's time difference to race winner Lewis Hamilton was +32.295 at the finish line, and the post-race penalty did not thus affect final race standings.

== Championship standings after the race ==
Drivers' Championship standings

	Pos.	Driver	Points
	1	(Germany) Sebastian Vettel	172
1	2	(Finland) Kimi Räikkönen	134
1	3	(Spain) Fernando Alonso	133
	4	(United Kingdom) Lewis Hamilton	124
	5	(Australia) Mark Webber	105

Constructors' Championship standings

Pos.	Constructor	Points
1	(Austria) Red Bull-Renault	277
2	(Germany) Mercedes	208
3	(Italy) Ferrari	194
4	(United Kingdom) Lotus-Renault	183
5	Force India-Mercedes	59

- Note: Only the top five positions are included for both sets of standings.

== See also ==
- 2013 Hungaroring GP2 Series round
- 2013 Hungaroring GP3 Series round

Previous race: 2013 German Grand Prix	FIA Formula One World Championship; 2013 season	Next race: 2013 Belgian Grand Prix
Previous race: 2012 Hungarian Grand Prix	Hungarian Grand Prix	Next race: 2014 Hungarian Grand Prix
