= 2013 Monaco Grand Prix =

Coordinates: 43°44′4.74″N 7°25′16.8″E

Race 6 of 19 in the 2013 Formula One World Championship
← Previous race	Next race →
- Circuit de Monaco

Race details
- Date: 26 May 2013
- Official name: Formula 1 Grand Prix de Monaco 2013
- Location: Circuit de Monaco
- Course: Street circuit
- Course length: 3.34 km (2.08 miles)
- Distance: 78 laps, 260.52 km (162.24 miles)
- Weather: Warm and sunny
- Attendance: 200,000 (Weekend)

Pole position
Driver	(Germany) Nico Rosberg	Mercedes
- Time: 1:13.876

Fastest lap
Driver	(Germany) Sebastian Vettel	Red Bull-Renault
- Time: 1:16.577 on lap 77

Podium
First	(Germany) Nico Rosberg	Mercedes
Second	(Germany) Sebastian Vettel	Red Bull-Renault
Third	(Australia) Mark Webber	Red Bull-Renault

The 2013 Monaco Grand Prix (formally known as the Formula 1 Grand Prix de Monaco 2013) was a Formula One motor race that took place on 26 May 2013 at the Circuit de Monaco, a street circuit that runs through the principality of Monaco. The race was won by Nico Rosberg for Mercedes AMG Petronas, repeating the feat of his father Keke Rosberg in the 1983 race. The race was the sixth round of the 2013 season, and marked the seventy-first time the Monaco Grand Prix has been held. Rosberg had started the race from pole.

== Report ==
=== Background ===
==== Tyres ====
Tyre supplier Pirelli brought its yellow-banded soft compound tyre as the harder "prime" tyre and the red-banded super-soft compound tyre as the softer "option" tyre, just as they did the previous two years. It was the second time in the season that the super-soft compound was used at a race weekend, as was the case with the soft tyre compound.

=== Free practice ===
Thursday's Free Practice sessions saw many drivers struggling to find grip on the circuit, as Jean-Éric Vergne and Kimi Räikkönen both suffered major lock-ups at turn 4, and went off into the small run-off area. Lewis Hamilton locked up badly at turn 8, with his teammate, Nico Rosberg, touching the barrier at turn 7. Grosjean and Massa both crashed into the barriers at turn 1, and with Massa's crash being on Saturday morning's Free Practice session, he was unable to compete in qualifying. Adrian Sutil crashed into the outside barrier at turn 2.

=== Qualifying ===
The three qualifying sessions were held on 25 May. Q1 and Q2 were rain-affected, with mostly dry conditions for Q3.

==== Q1 ====
Force India's Paul di Resta, Caterham's Charles Pic, Sauber's Esteban Gutiérrez, Marussia's Max Chilton and Jules Bianchi, and Ferrari's Felipe Massa did not make it out of the first qualifying session. Bianchi stopped on track with an engine issue before setting a timed lap. Massa did not run a lap as his car was still being repaired following a crash in Free Practice Session No. 3. Giedo van der Garde became the first Caterham driver to advance to the second round of qualifying in the 2013 season.

==== Q2 ====
Sauber's Nico Hülkenberg, Toro Rosso's Daniel Ricciardo, Lotus' Romain Grosjean, both Williams drivers Valtteri Bottas and Pastor Maldonado, as well as Caterham's Giedo van der Garde were knocked out and did not advance.

==== Q3 ====
Mercedes's Nico Rosberg took pole position for the Monaco Grand Prix with a time of 1m13.876s. Mercedes's Lewis Hamilton and Red Bull's Sebastian Vettel set the next two fastest times during the final round of qualifying. It was the third pole position in a row for Rosberg and the second Mercedes front row lockout in a row.

=== Race ===
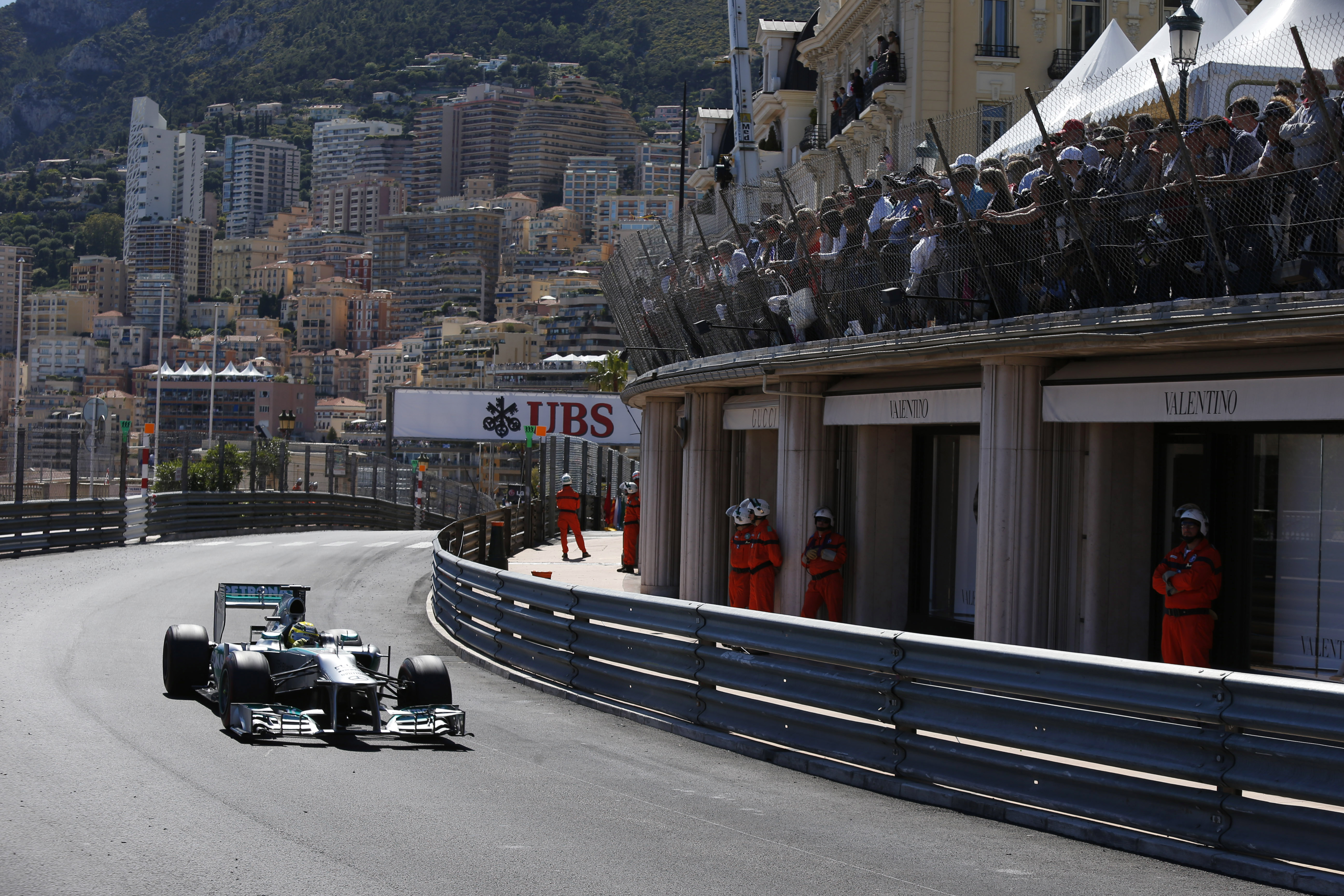
Nico Rosberg in the Massenet curve

Rosberg led from pole position ahead of teammate Lewis Hamilton at the start and Red Bull's Sebastian Vettel and Mark Webber. Marussia's Bianchi started from pit lane after an issue on the starting grid. Maldonado and van der Garde had contact which forced Maldonado to pit the Williams for a new front wing. On lap 9, Charles Pic pulled over near the pit entry with an engine fire in the Caterham.

Ferrari's Felipe Massa had a large shunt going into Sainte Devote, very similar to his crash in the third free practice session on Saturday, but this time it was caused by a suspension failure. The safety car was deployed for the first time in the 2013 season and Rosberg retained the lead after a pit stop. Hamilton dropped to fourth place after leaving too much of a gap to the Red Bulls.

On lap 45, Maldonado and Chilton touched near Tabac sending Maldonado into the barriers. The race was red flagged to repair damage to the barriers and remove Maldonado's wrecked Williams, although Chilton was able to resume. The race resumed behind the safety car with Rosberg leading Vettel, Webber, and Hamilton. During the red flag stop, Sergio Pérez was given the position by Alonso, who was trying to avoid a penalty caused by an earlier incident at the chicane.

Lotus's Grosjean crashed into the back of Toro Rosso's Ricciardo exiting the tunnel and the safety car was brought out once again. After the race, it was announced that Grosjean would receive a 10-place grid penalty for the Canadian Grand Prix because of the crash.

Pérez touched the barriers near the Nouvelle Chicane after trying to overtake Räikkönen on lap 69, Räikkönen had to pit for new tyres following a puncture caused by the collision. Fernando Alonso, teammate Jenson Button and Räikkönen himself later complained about Pérez's aggressive driving during the race, even though he did not receive any penalties. Pérez later retired after running down the exit road near Rascasse.

After Vettel set the race's fastest lap, 1:16.577, on lap 77 Red Bull reprimanded their driver over the radio for taking unnecessary risks, saying that there were no points to be gained for setting the fastest lap. Vettel replied "but satisfaction".

Rosberg won the race ahead of Vettel, Webber and Hamilton, having led from start to finish. His victory came 30 years after his father, Keke Rosberg, won the 1983 Monaco Grand Prix. Raikkonen passed several cars on the last two laps to take the final points position.

== Classification ==
=== Qualifying ===
Pos.	No.	Driver	Constructor	Q1	Q2	Q3	Grid
1	9	(Germany) Nico Rosberg	Mercedes	1:24.620	1:16.135	1:13.876	1
2	10	(United Kingdom) Lewis Hamilton	Mercedes	1:23.779	1:16.265	1:13.967	2
3	1	(Germany) Sebastian Vettel	Red Bull-Renault	1:24.243	1:15.988	1:13.980	3
4	2	(Australia) Mark Webber	Red Bull-Renault	1:25.352	1:17.322	1:14.181	4
5	7	(Finland) Kimi Räikkönen	Lotus-Renault	1:25.835	1:16.040	1:14.822	5
6	3	(Spain) Fernando Alonso	Ferrari	1:23.712	1:16.510	1:14.824	6
7	6	(Mexico) Sergio Pérez	McLaren-Mercedes	1:24.682	1:17.748	1:15.138	7
8	15	(Germany) Adrian Sutil	Force India-Mercedes	1:25.108	1:17.261	1:15.383	8
9	5	(United Kingdom) Jenson Button	McLaren-Mercedes	1:23.744	1:17.420	1:15.647	9
10	18	(France) Jean-Éric Vergne	Toro Rosso-Ferrari	1:23.699	1:17.623	1:15.703	10
11	11	(Germany) Nico Hülkenberg	Sauber-Ferrari	1:25.547	1:18.331		11
12	19	(Australia) Daniel Ricciardo	Toro Rosso-Ferrari	1:24.852	1:18.344		12
13	8	(France) Romain Grosjean	Lotus-Renault	1:23.738	1:18.603		13
14	17	(Finland) Valtteri Bottas	Williams-Renault	1:24.681	1:19.077		14
15	21	(Netherlands) Giedo van der Garde	Caterham-Renault	1:26.095	1:19.408		15
16	16	(Venezuela) Pastor Maldonado	Williams-Renault	1:23.452	1:21.688		16
17	14	(United Kingdom) Paul di Resta	Force India-Mercedes	1:26.322			17
18	20	(France) Charles Pic	Caterham-Renault	1:26.633			18
19	12	(Mexico) Esteban Gutiérrez	Sauber-Ferrari	1:26.917			19
20	23	(United Kingdom) Max Chilton	Marussia-Cosworth	1:27.303			22^{1}
107% time: 1:29.293
21	22	(France) Jules Bianchi	Marussia-Cosworth	no time			20^{2}
22	4	(Brazil) Felipe Massa	Ferrari	no time			21^{3}

Notes:

- ^1 — Max Chilton was given a five-place grid penalty for an unscheduled gearbox change.
- ^2 — Jules Bianchi failed to set a qualifying time within the 107% requirement after an engine failure, but was permitted to race at stewards' discretion.
- ^3 — Felipe Massa failed to set a qualifying time within the 107% requirement after his car was damaged during free practice, and his team were unable to repair the damage in time for him to take part in qualifying, despite changing the gearbox. He was permitted to race as he set qualified time during all three free practice sessions.

=== Race ===
Pos.	No.	Driver	Constructor	Laps	Time/Retired	Grid	Points
1	9	(Germany) Nico Rosberg	Mercedes	78	2:17:52.506	1	25
2	1	(Germany) Sebastian Vettel	Red Bull-Renault	78	+ 3.889	3	18
3	2	(Australia) Mark Webber	Red Bull-Renault	78	+ 6.314	4	15
4	10	(United Kingdom) Lewis Hamilton	Mercedes	78	+ 13.895	2	12
5	15	(Germany) Adrian Sutil	Force India-Mercedes	78	+ 21.478	8	10
6	5	(United Kingdom) Jenson Button	McLaren-Mercedes	78	+ 23.104	9	8
7	3	(Spain) Fernando Alonso	Ferrari	78	+ 26.734	6	6
8	18	(France) Jean-Éric Vergne	Toro Rosso-Ferrari	78	+ 27.224	10	4
9	14	(United Kingdom) Paul di Resta	Force India-Mercedes	78	+ 27.608	17	2
10	7	(Finland) Kimi Räikkönen	Lotus-Renault	78	+ 36.582	5	1
11	11	(Germany) Nico Hülkenberg	Sauber-Ferrari	78	+ 42.572	11	
12	17	(Finland) Valtteri Bottas	Williams-Renault	78	+ 42.691	14	
13	12	(Mexico) Esteban Gutiérrez	Sauber-Ferrari	78	+ 43.212	19	
14	23	(United Kingdom) Max Chilton	Marussia-Cosworth	78	+ 49.886	22	
15	21	(Netherlands) Giedo van der Garde	Caterham-Renault	78	+ 1:02.591	15	
16	6	(Mexico) Sergio Pérez	McLaren-Mercedes	72	Collision Damage	7	
Ret	8	(France) Romain Grosjean	Lotus-Renault	63	Collision Damage	13	
Ret	19	(Australia) Daniel Ricciardo	Toro Rosso-Ferrari	61	Collision	12	
Ret	22	(France) Jules Bianchi	Marussia-Cosworth	58	Accident	20	
Ret	16	(Venezuela) Pastor Maldonado	Williams-Renault	44	Collision	16	
Ret	4	(Brazil) Felipe Massa	Ferrari	28	Accident	21	
Ret	20	(France) Charles Pic	Caterham-Renault	7	Engine	18	

== Championship standings after the race ==
Drivers' Championship standings

	Pos.	Driver	Points
	1	(Germany) Sebastian Vettel	107
	2	(Finland) Kimi Räikkönen	86
	3	(Spain) Fernando Alonso	78
	4	(United Kingdom) Lewis Hamilton	62
1	5	(Australia) Mark Webber	57

Constructors' Championship standings

Pos.	Constructor	Points
1	(Austria) Red Bull-Renault	164
2	(Italy) Ferrari	123
3	(United Kingdom) Lotus-Renault	112
4	(Germany) Mercedes	109
5	Force India-Mercedes	44

== See also ==
- 2013 Monaco GP2 Series round

Previous race: 2013 Spanish Grand Prix	FIA Formula One World Championship; 2013 season	Next race: 2013 Canadian Grand Prix
Previous race: 2012 Monaco Grand Prix	Monaco Grand Prix	Next race: 2014 Monaco Grand Prix
