= 2012 Singapore Grand Prix =

14th round of the 2012 Formula One season

Race 14 of 20 in the 2012 Formula One World Championship
← Previous race	Next race →
- Marina Bay Street Circuit

Race details
- Date: 23 September 2012
- Official name: 2012 Formula 1 SingTel Singapore Grand Prix
- Location: Marina Bay Street Circuit; Marina Bay, Singapore
- Course: Street circuit
- Course length: 5.073 km (3.152 miles)
- Distance: 59 laps, 299.170 km (185.896 miles)
- Scheduled distance: 61 laps, 309.316 km (192.201 miles)
- Weather: Hot and humid Air Temp 29 °C (84 °F); Track Temp 31 °C (88 °F)
- Attendance: 252,951 (3-Day Total); 84,317 (3-Day Average)

Pole position
Driver	(United Kingdom) Lewis Hamilton	McLaren-Mercedes
- Time: 1:46.362

Fastest lap
Driver	(Germany) Nico Hülkenberg	Force India-Mercedes
- Time: 1:51.033 on lap 52

Podium
First	(Germany) Sebastian Vettel	Red Bull-Renault
Second	(United Kingdom) Jenson Button	McLaren-Mercedes
Third	(Spain) Fernando Alonso	Ferrari

The 2012 Singapore Grand Prix (officially the 2012 Formula 1 SingTel Singapore Grand Prix) was a Formula One motor race that took place at the Marina Bay Street Circuit in Marina Bay, Singapore on 23 September 2012 as the fourteenth round of the 2012 season. The race was the thirteenth time that a Singapore Grand Prix has been held, and the fifth time it was a round of the Formula One World Championship.

Lewis Hamilton started the race from pole. Sebastian Vettel won the race, his second of the season, after Hamilton's gearbox failed early in the race. Hamilton's teammate Jenson Button finished second, with championship leader Fernando Alonso rounding out the podium in third.

== Report ==
=== Background ===
Having been unable to race in Italy two weeks earlier because of a one-race ban he received for causing a serious collision in Belgium, Romain Grosjean was back in the driving seat again with Lotus F1 for the race in Singapore.

Like the 2011 Singapore Grand Prix, tyre supplier Pirelli brought its yellow-banded soft compound tyre as the harder "prime" tyre and the red-banded supersoft compound tyre as the softer "option" tyre.

At Singapore's Marina Bay circuit, Ma Qinghua once again drove Narain Karthikeyan's car in the first free practice session, as he had during free practice at the Italian Grand Prix in Monza,

=== Free practice ===
The first practice session on Friday evening was held in damp conditions. Rain earlier in the day had soaked the circuit, but it began drying out as the session started. Sebastian Vettel set the fastest time of the session, five hundredths of a second faster than Lewis Hamilton. Although several drivers went off the circuit, they were able to rejoin without damage and the session was uninterrupted. By the time the second session began, the circuit was completely dry. Vettel was once again fastest, this time three-tenths of a second faster than Jenson Button. The session was briefly interrupted when Bruno Senna clipped a barrier coming out from under the grandstand at turn 19 before spinning to a halt at the next corner. Vettel topped the third and final session on Saturday evening, three-tenths faster than Hamilton. The session was cut short two minutes before the chequered flag when Vitaly Petrov hit the wall at Turn 21, breaking his right-rear suspension and as a consequence, his Caterham stopped in the entrance to the pitlane and by doing so, blocked it causing a red flag until the session ended.

=== Qualifying ===
The first qualifying period saw several teams caught out by the difference in performance between the harder prime tyres and the softer options, which was estimated to be up to a second and a half per lap. The end result was that several teams had to use up a set of soft tyres to guarantee a place in the second period. Williams' Bruno Senna clipped the wall on his final lap while faced with the threat of elimination, but made it through to the second period by a tenth of a second when Kamui Kobayashi failed to better his lap time. Vitaly Petrov out-qualified teammate Heikki Kovalainen to start nineteenth, putting the Caterhams ahead of Marussia duo of Timo Glock and Charles Pic. HRT once again filled the final row of the grid, with Narain Karthikeyan out-qualifying Pedro de la Rosa for the second race in succession with a time that was almost a second faster than the Spaniard's. De la Rosa started qualifying with the knowledge that he would receive a five-place grid penalty for an unscheduled gearbox change regardless of where he started, but as he qualified twenty-fourth and last, the effect of the penalty was negated.

The second qualifying period started with Senna and Romain Grosjean crashing. While Grosjean was able to continue after mechanics inspected his car, Senna – who had once again hit the wall at Turn 19, his third such incident at that corner – returned to the pit with terminal damage. With his failure to set a lap time, he was relegated to seventeenth on the grid. At the end of the fifteen-minute session, Nico Hülkenberg was eliminated in eleventh, and later admitted that he felt he could have gone faster in the first sector. Kimi Räikkönen qualified alongside him in twelfth, ahead of Felipe Massa and Sergio Pérez. Scuderia Toro Rosso drivers Daniel Ricciardo and Jean-Éric Vergne had a quiet qualifying session, and ultimately finished fifteenth and sixteenth respectively.

Mercedes elected not to take part in the final period of qualifying, allowing Michael Schumacher and Nico Rosberg to save a set of tyres and giving them the choice of which compound on which to start the race. As a result, only eight drivers took part in the final ten minutes of qualifying. Lewis Hamilton prevailed, taking pole position by half a second from Pastor Maldonado. After being consistently fast through free practice, Sebastian Vettel could only manage third overall, ahead of Jenson Button and Fernando Alonso, the latter admitting that he was not expecting to be fast during the Singapore Grand Prix weekend. Paul di Resta qualified sixth, ahead of Mark Webber, leaving Romain Grosjean as the eighth and final driver to set a time.

==== Post-qualifying ====
In an interview after qualifying, Lewis Hamilton publicly implored Pastor Maldonado to be careful during the start of the race, given the latter's reputation for reckless driving and frequent on-track incidents.

=== Pre-race ===
A minute of silence was held for Sid Watkins, who died on 12 September 2012. A book of remembrance was also available for people to sign their condolences over the weekend.

=== Race ===
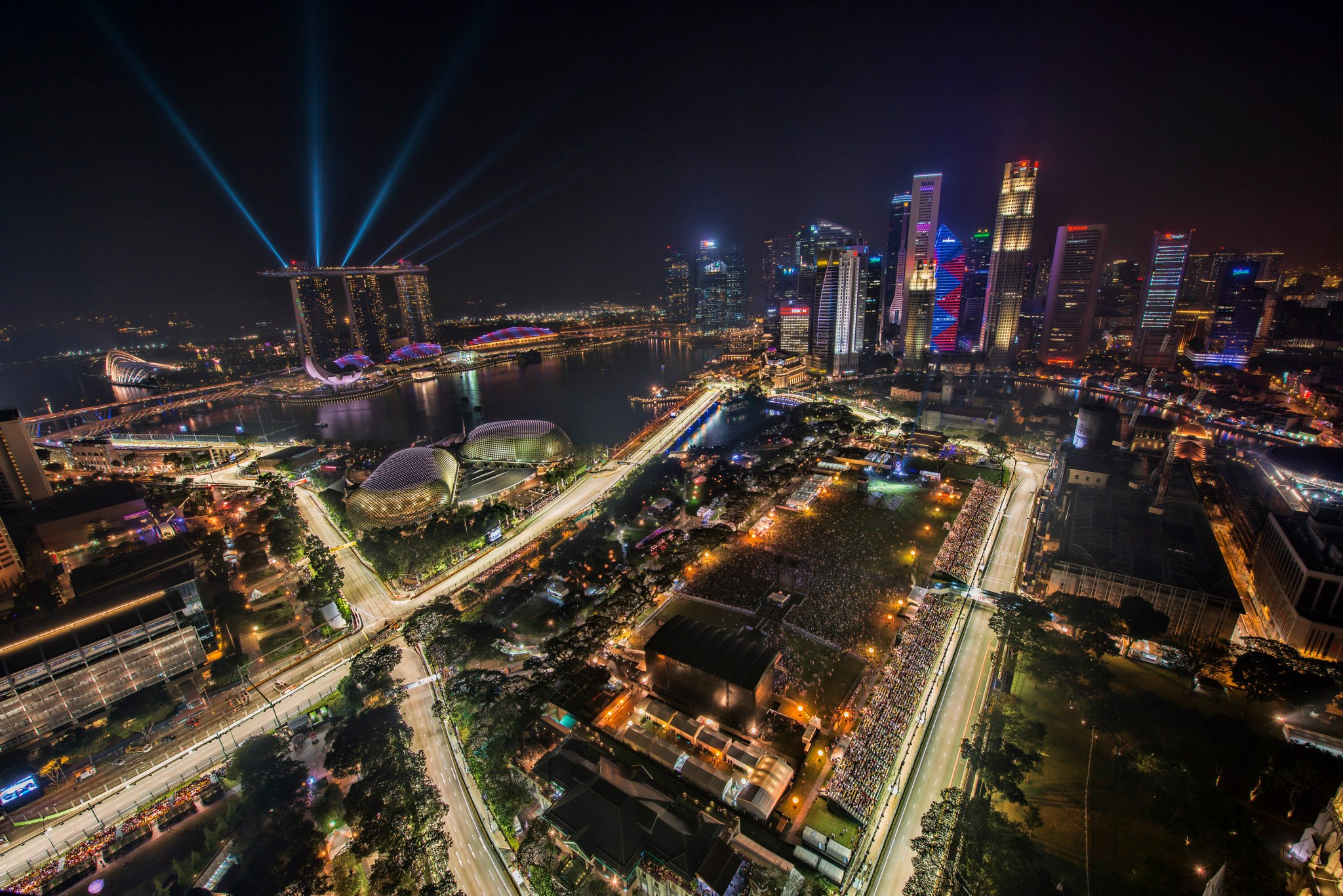
Day 2

Hamilton led lap 1 with Maldonado falling to 4th with Vettel and Button overtaking into P2 and P3 respectively.

On lap 9, Webber made an early pitstop onto the soft compound tyres, making him drop from 7th to 19th. This created a chain reaction, as his stop was followed by Vettel stopping on lap 11 and Alonso on lap 12. Race leader Lewis Hamilton emerged just ahead of Vettel after his stop on lap 13, after complaining of a "funny feeling". His teammate Jenson Button came out behind Vettel after his stop on lap 14.

On lap 23, Hamilton's gearbox failed forcing him to retire allowing Vettel to take P1 which continued until the end of the race. It was noted to be the 2nd mechanical retirement for the Briton.

On lap 30, Karthikeyan crashed at turn 18 causing yellow flags and a safety car to be deployed. Maldonado retired with hydraulic issues before the safety car came in. He had a call 1 lap before he came to the pits and retired. 2 laps later, Schumacher and Vergne collided, with Schumacher failing to brake properly, and consequently crashing into the back of Vergne's Toro Rosso, resulting in their retirement. After the crash, Michael Schumacher climbed out of his car and went over to apologise to Vergne, this brought out the safety car for the second time in the race, it came in at the start of Lap 42 and racing resumed. Vettel went on to win the race and he dedicated his victory to Sid Watkins who had recently died.

Paul di Resta managed to keep Mercedes driver Nico Rosberg at bay to claim his career-best finish of P4, gaining him two places in the Drivers' Championship to stand 11th. the race finished two laps early as the two-hour limit was reached, the first time this had happened since the 2008 Monaco Grand Prix.

==== Post-race ====
The top three drivers appeared on the podium to collect their trophies and spoke to the media at a later press conference. Red Bull team mechanic Ole Schack appeared on the podium to receive the winning manufacturer's award.

After the race, the stewards gave Michael Schumacher a ten-place grid penalty at the next race, Suzuka, after he crashed into Jean-Eric Vergne and caused them both to retire. This penalty was applied in accordance with article 16.1 of the FIA Formula One Sporting Regulations. Mark Webber was also demoted by a place, losing the 10th place and the point to finish 11th, due to a move deemed by the FIA to be advantageous as it resulted in an unfair advantage.

Vettel's win enabled him to advance from fourth to second in the championship, while Hamilton did the reverse. Vettel amassed a points total of 165 points and was able to decrease his disadvantage in the Drivers' Championship to 29 points over Alonso. Räikkönen remained third with 149 points, seven and seventeen ahead of Hamilton and Webber in fourth and fifth, respectively. The top five in the Constructors' Championship remained unchanged; Red Bull managed to extend their lead to 36 points over McLaren, with Ferrari and Lotus being a further 16 and 30 points adrift in third and fourth, respectively.

== Classification ==
=== Qualifying ===
Pos.	No.	Driver	Constructor	Part 1	Part 2	Part 3	Grid
1	4	(United Kingdom) Lewis Hamilton	McLaren-Mercedes	1:48.285	1:46.665	1:46.362	1
2	18	(Venezuela) Pastor Maldonado	Williams-Renault	1:49.494	1:47.602	1:46.804	2
3	1	(Germany) Sebastian Vettel	Red Bull-Renault	1:48.240	1:46.791	1:46.905	3
4	3	(United Kingdom) Jenson Button	McLaren-Mercedes	1:49.381	1:47.661	1:46.939	4
5	5	(Spain) Fernando Alonso	Ferrari	1:49.391	1:47.567	1:47.216	5
6	11	(United Kingdom) Paul di Resta	Force India-Mercedes	1:48.028	1:47.667	1:47.241	6
7	2	(Australia) Mark Webber	Red Bull-Renault	1:48.717	1:47.513	1:47.475	7
8	10	(France) Romain Grosjean	Lotus-Renault	1:47.668	1:47.529	1:47.788	8
9	7	(Germany) Michael Schumacher	Mercedes	1:49.546	1:47.823	no time	9
10	8	(Germany) Nico Rosberg	Mercedes	1:49.463	1:47.943	no time	10
11	12	(Germany) Nico Hülkenberg	Force India-Mercedes	1:49.547	1:47.975		11
12	9	(Finland) Kimi Räikkönen	Lotus-Renault	1:48.169	1:48.261		12
13	6	(Brazil) Felipe Massa	Ferrari	1:49.767	1:48.344		13
14	15	(Mexico) Sergio Pérez	Sauber-Ferrari	1:49.055	1:48.505		14
15	16	(Australia) Daniel Ricciardo	Toro Rosso-Ferrari	1:49.023	1:48.774		15
16	17	(France) Jean-Éric Vergne	Toro Rosso-Ferrari	1:49.564	1:48.849		16
17	19	(Brazil) Bruno Senna	Williams-Renault	1:49.809	no time		22^{1}
18	14	(Japan) Kamui Kobayashi	Sauber-Ferrari	1:49.933			17
19	21	(Russia) Vitaly Petrov	Caterham-Renault	1:50.846			18
20	20	(Finland) Heikki Kovalainen	Caterham-Renault	1:51.137			19
21	24	(Germany) Timo Glock	Marussia-Cosworth	1:51.370			20
22	25	(France) Charles Pic	Marussia-Cosworth	1:51.762			21
23	23	(India) Narain Karthikeyan	HRT-Cosworth	1:52.372			23
24	22	(Spain) Pedro de la Rosa	HRT-Cosworth	1:53.355			24^{1}
107% time: 1:55.226

Notes:

- ^1 — Bruno Senna and Pedro de la Rosa received five-place grid penalties for unscheduled gearbox changes.

=== Race ===
Pos	No	Driver	Constructor	Laps	Time/Retired	Grid	Points
1	1	(Germany) Sebastian Vettel	Red Bull-Renault	59	2:00:26.144	3	25
2	3	(United Kingdom) Jenson Button	McLaren-Mercedes	59	+8.959	4	18
3	5	(Spain) Fernando Alonso	Ferrari	59	+15.227	5	15
4	11	(United Kingdom) Paul di Resta	Force India-Mercedes	59	+19.063	6	12
5	8	(Germany) Nico Rosberg	Mercedes	59	+34.784	10	10
6	9	(Finland) Kimi Räikkönen	Lotus-Renault	59	+35.759	12	8
7	10	(France) Romain Grosjean	Lotus-Renault	59	+36.698	8	6
8	6	(Brazil) Felipe Massa	Ferrari	59	+42.829	13	4
9	16	(Australia) Daniel Ricciardo	Toro Rosso-Ferrari	59	+45.820	15	2
10	15	(Mexico) Sergio Pérez	Sauber-Ferrari	59	+50.619	14	1
11	2	(Australia) Mark Webber	Red Bull-Renault	59	+1:07.175^{1}	7	
12	24	(Germany) Timo Glock	Marussia-Cosworth	59	+1:31.918	20	
13	14	(Japan) Kamui Kobayashi	Sauber-Ferrari	59	+1:37.141	17	
14	12	(Germany) Nico Hülkenberg	Force India-Mercedes	59	+1:39.413	11	
15	20	(Finland) Heikki Kovalainen	Caterham-Renault	59	+1:47.467	19	
16	25	(France) Charles Pic	Marussia-Cosworth	59	+2:12.925^{2}	21	
17	22	(Spain) Pedro de la Rosa	HRT-Cosworth	58	+1 Lap	24	
18	19	(Brazil) Bruno Senna	Williams-Renault	57	Engine	22	
19	21	(Russia) Vitaly Petrov	Caterham-Renault	57	+2 Laps	18	
Ret	17	(France) Jean-Éric Vergne	Toro Rosso-Ferrari	38	Collision	16	
Ret	7	(Germany) Michael Schumacher	Mercedes	38	Collision	9	
Ret	18	(Venezuela) Pastor Maldonado	Williams-Renault	36	Hydraulics	2	
Ret	23	(India) Narain Karthikeyan	HRT-Cosworth	30	Accident	23	
Ret	4	(United Kingdom) Lewis Hamilton	McLaren-Mercedes	22	Gearbox	1	

Notes:

- ^1 — Mark Webber originally finished in tenth place, but had twenty seconds added to his time after he cut a corner in order to pass Kamui Kobayashi.
- ^2 — Charles Pic had twenty seconds added to his race time after he was spotted overtaking another car while red flags were being shown in the final free practice session.

== Championship standings after the race ==
Drivers' Championship standings

	Pos.	Driver	Points
	1	(Spain) Fernando Alonso	194
2	2	(Germany) Sebastian Vettel	165
	3	(Finland) Kimi Räikkönen	149
2	4	(United Kingdom) Lewis Hamilton	142
	5	(Australia) Mark Webber	132

Constructors' Championship standings

Pos.	Constructor	Points
1	(Austria) Red Bull-Renault	297
2	(United Kingdom) McLaren-Mercedes	261
3	(Italy) Ferrari	245
4	(United Kingdom) Lotus-Renault	231
5	(Germany) Mercedes	136

- Note: Only the top five positions are included for both sets of standings.

== See also ==
- 2012 Marina Bay GP2 Series round

Previous race: 2012 Italian Grand Prix	FIA Formula One World Championship; 2012 season	Next race: 2012 Japanese Grand Prix
Previous race: 2011 Singapore Grand Prix	Singapore Grand Prix	Next race: 2013 Singapore Grand Prix
