= 2012 Italian Grand Prix =

Race 13 of 20 in the 2012 Formula One World Championship
| ← Previous race | Next race → |
- Layout of the Autodromo Nazionale di Monza

Race details
- Date: 9 September 2012
- Official name: Formula 1 Gran Premio Santander d'Italia 2012
- Location: Autodromo Nazionale di Monza, Monza, Italy
- Course: Permanent racing facility
- Course length: 5.793 km (3.6 miles)
- Distance: 53 laps, 306.720 km (190.58 miles)
- Weather: Dry and sizzlingly sunny Air temp 28 °C (82 °F) Track temp 40 °C (104 °F)

Pole position
| Driver | (United Kingdom) Lewis Hamilton | McLaren-Mercedes |
- Time: 1:24.010

Fastest lap
| Driver | (Germany) Nico Rosberg | Mercedes |
- Time: 1:27.239 on lap 53

Podium
| First | (United Kingdom) Lewis Hamilton | McLaren-Mercedes |
| Second | (Mexico) Sergio Pérez | Sauber-Ferrari |
| Third | (Spain) Fernando Alonso | Ferrari |

The 2012 Italian Grand Prix (formally known as the Formula 1 Gran Premio Santander d'Italia 2012) was a Formula One motor race that took place at the Autodromo Nazionale di Monza in Monza, Italy on 9 September 2012. It was the thirteenth race of the 2012 season, and the final race in Europe before the teams returned to Asia for the Singapore Grand Prix.

Lewis Hamilton qualified on pole, ahead of teammate Jenson Button. The result gave McLaren their sixty-second front-row lock-out, breaking the previous record set by Williams. Hamilton won the race by four seconds from Sergio Pérez, with Fernando Alonso completing the podium. This was McLaren's last win at Monza until 2021 and as well the last race without Romain Grosjean until the 2020 Sakhir Grand Prix. This was also the last F1 race for Jerome d'Ambrosio.

== Report ==
=== Background ===
Tyre supplier Pirelli brought its silver-banded hard compound tyre as the harder "prime" tyre and the white-banded medium compound tyre as the softer "option" tyre.

==== Circuit changes ====
The drag reduction system zones used in 2011 were shortened for the 2012 race. The first DRS zone, located on the straight between the second Lesmo corner and the Variante Ascari, was shortened by fifty meters, while the DRS zone on the front straight was shortened by five meters.

==== Driver penalties ====
Lotus driver Romain Grosjean did not participate in the race due to receiving a one-race ban for his involvement in the first-lap incident at the Belgian Grand Prix that saw four cars crash heavily at the La Source hairpin. Grosjean was replaced by the team's testing and reserve driver, Jérôme d'Ambrosio. Estonian Kevin Korjus became reserve driver for the weekend.

Pastor Maldonado received two five-place grid penalties. the first for jumping the start of the Belgian Grand Prix and the second for causing an avoidable accident with Timo Glock after Grosjean's accident.

Paul di Resta was also demoted five places for an unscheduled gearbox change on Saturday morning, his second gearbox penalty of the season.

==== Driver changes ====
Ma Qinghua became the first Chinese driver to take part in a Grand Prix weekend when he drove Narain Karthikeyan's HRT F112 in the first free practice session on Friday morning. Valtteri Bottas drove Bruno Senna's Williams FW34 in the same session, while Jules Bianchi took Paul di Resta's place at Force India.

=== Free practice ===
Mercedes AMG driver Michael Schumacher was fastest in the first practice session, three-tenths of a second quicker than Jenson Button and Nico Rosberg. For Lotus, Jérôme d'Ambrosio finished the session fifteenth, over a second and a half slower than Schumacher and sixth-tenths down on teammate Kimi Räikkönen. Ma Qinghua was the slowest runner after ninety minutes, nearly six seconds slower than Schumacher, and within two seconds of teammate Pedro de la Rosa. At the end of the session, both Fernando Alonso and Pastor Maldonado were observed to stop on the circuit with technical problems.

Lewis Hamilton was the fastest driver in the second session, narrowly edging out Button and Alonso, the latter of whom had another disrupted session with a series of technical problems surrounding the gearbox and brakes that limited his time on the circuit. Having set the fastest time in the morning session, Schumacher finished tenth following a series of off-track excursions. He was highly-critical of the speed bumps placed around the Variante della Roggia chicane, claiming they were a safety hazard that could result in serious injury if a driver hit them at speed.

Hamilton was once again fastest in the third session, just one thousandth of a second ahead of Alonso. Paul di Resta finished the session third, while Sebastian Vettel suffered a loss of power on his final lap and pulled over at the Roggia chicane. The Red Bull RB8 was consistently one of the slowest cars through the speed trap, evidenced by the way neither Red Bull driver featured in the top ten runners in any of the free practice sessions, with the exception of Mark Webber, who set the ninth-fastest time of the first session.

=== Race ===
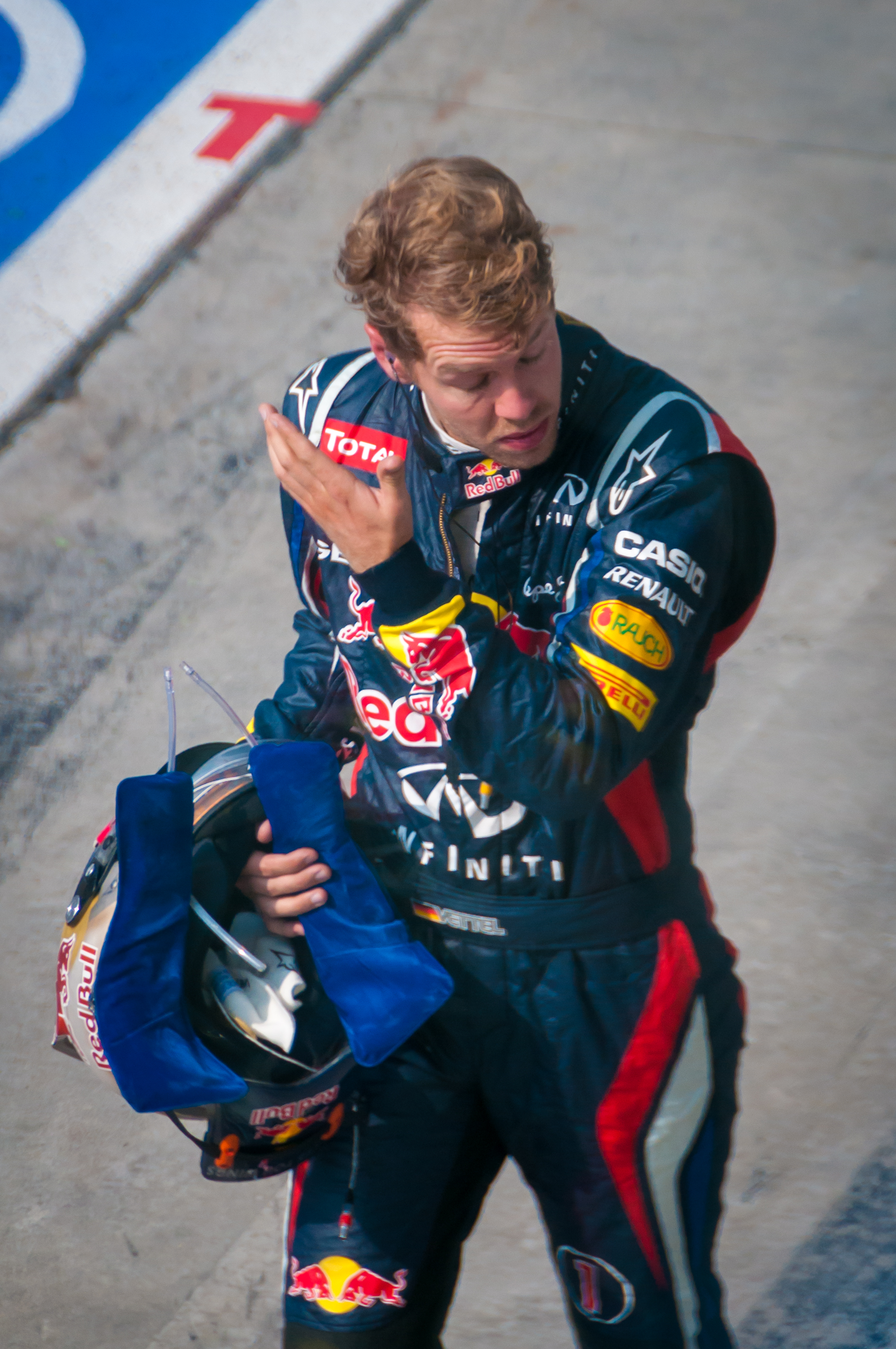
Vettel walking back to the pits after his retirement

Felipe Massa made a great start to pass Jenson Button for second place. He pulled alongside pole sitter Lewis Hamilton going into the first chicane, but Hamilton had the inside line and was able to stay ahead. Fernando Alonso was able to make his way up from 10th to 7th place by the end of the first lap, and passed Kimi Räikkönen for 6th going into the first chicane on the second lap.

On lap 4, Sebastian Vettel passed Michael Schumacher under braking into the first chicane for 4th place. One lap later, Bruno Senna attempted to pass Nico Rosberg around the outside into the first chicane. Senna turned into Rosberg, they banged wheels, and Senna went straight through the chicane to take 11th. Fernando Alonso was able to pass Schumacher coming out of the Parabolica on lap 7.

On lap 8, Bruno Senna tried to pass Paul di Resta on the outside going into the second chicane. Di Resta moved over, forcing Senna onto the gravel. Senna went straight through the chicane and back onto the racing line right in front of Mark Webber, who dodged around him as they entered the first Lesmo corner. On the next lap, Jean-Éric Vergne had a right rear suspension failure under braking into the first chicane. He spun and slid sideways over one of the curbs, launching his car into the air over the chicane.

Jenson Button retook 2nd place from Felipe Massa in the 2nd chicane on lap 19, who was suffering from a loss of telemetry and pitted on lap 20. Fernando Alonso and Sebastian Vettel pitted at the same time on lap 21, and came out right behind Massa with only a car's length separating each of the three. Lewis Hamilton pitted on lap 24, allowing Sergio Pérez, who hadn't pitted yet, to take the lead from 2nd.

On lap 26, Fernando Alonso tried to go around the outside of Sebastian Vettel through Curva Grande. Vettel moved to the outside, pushing Alonso off the track and onto the grass. Alonso managed to keep control of his car and was furious at Vettel's antics. The move was similar to a move Vettel pulled on Alonso the year before, but this time Vettel was given a drive-through penalty. Alonso was able to pass Vettel on lap 29, and the drive-through on lap 35 put Vettel in 9th place behind Webber.

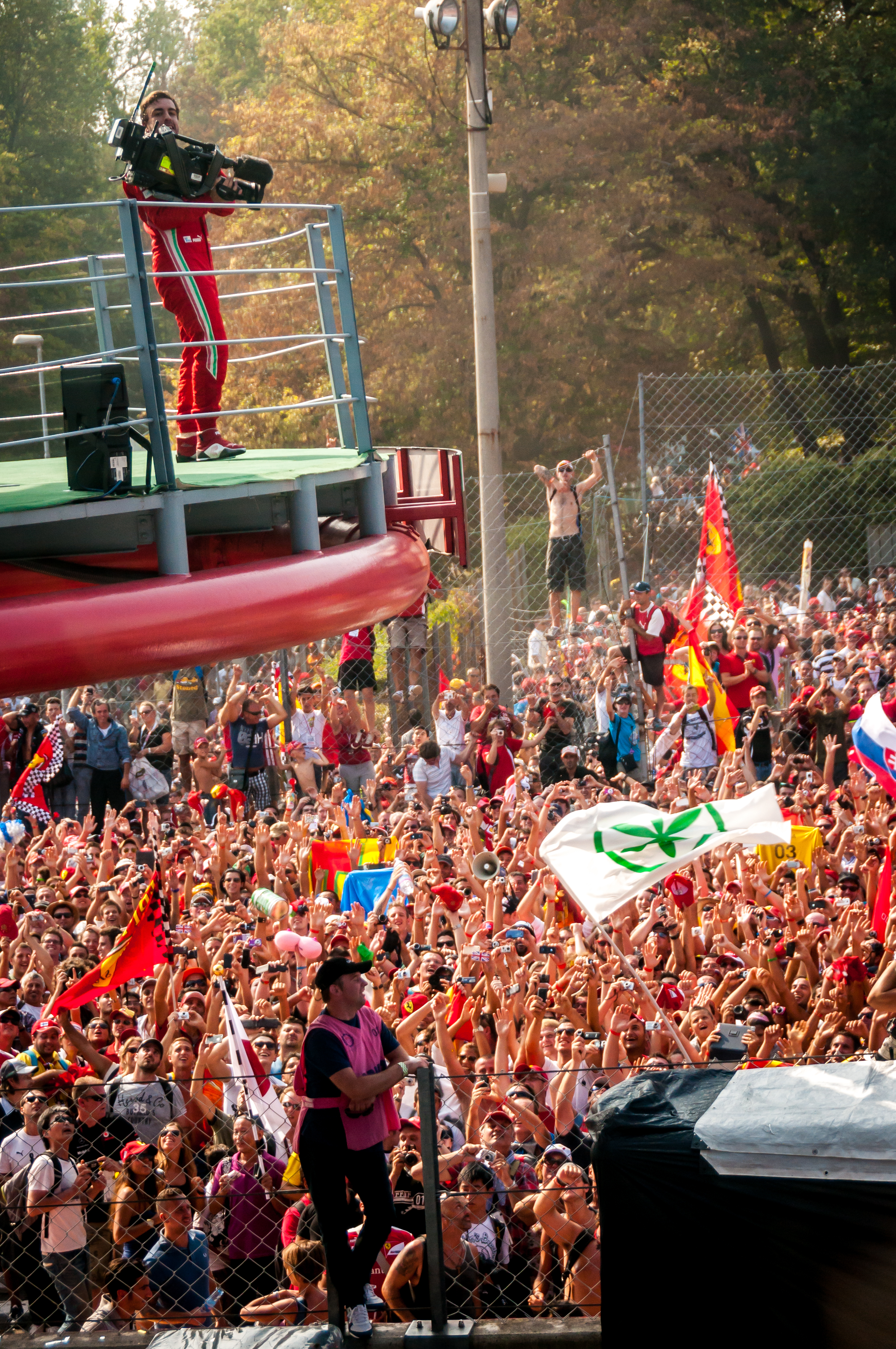
After the podium ceremony, third-placed Alonso took over a TV camera

Lewis Hamilton retook the lead from Sergio Pérez on lap 29 at the first chicane. Pérez pitted on the next lap and came back out in 8th place. Jenson Button retired on lap 34 following a sudden loss of fuel pressure. This moved Felipe Massa back up to 2nd with Fernando Alonso and Sergio Pérez gaining on him. Massa was passed by Alonso on lap 40, and then by Pérez three laps later. Pérez quickly chased down Alonso and passed him on lap 46.

Sebastian Vettel retired on lap 47 with a failed alternator. On lap 51, Mark Webber clipped the curb on the exit of the Ascari chicane and spun. He fell out of the point-scoring positions and retired due to severely flat-spotted tires.

Lewis Hamilton won the race, completing a 3 race win streak for McLaren. In 2nd was Sergio Pérez, who started 12th, and was quickly catching him in the latter changes of the race. Fernando Alonso completed the podium to the joy of the Tifosi, having started 10th.

Alonso's third place-finish enabled him to extend his lead in the Drivers' Championship to 37 points after bringing up his total to 179 points. Behind Alonso, a large shuffle in the championship order was occurring, with race winner Hamilton climbing up three places in the standings from fifth to second, only one point ahead of Räikkönen who moved up to third with 141 points, while both Red Bull drivers Vettel and Webber dropped down two places each to settle for fourth and fifth place, respectively. Hamilton's victory also enabled McLaren to narrow the gap to Red Bull to 29 points in the championship, while Ferrari overtook Lotus for third place in the standings with 226 points, 17 behind McLaren.

== Classification ==
=== Qualifying ===
| Pos. | No. | Driver | Constructor | Q1 | Q2 | Q3 | Grid |
|---|---|---|---|---|---|---|---|
| 1 | 4 | (United Kingdom) Lewis Hamilton | McLaren-Mercedes | 1:24.211 | 1:24.394 | 1:24.010 | 1 |
| 2 | 3 | (United Kingdom) Jenson Button | McLaren-Mercedes | 1:24.672 | 1:24.255 | 1:24.133 | 2 |
| 3 | 6 | (Brazil) Felipe Massa | Ferrari | 1:24.882 | 1:24.505 | 1:24.247 | 3 |
| 4 | 11 | (United Kingdom) Paul di Resta | Force India-Mercedes | 1:24.875 | 1:24.345 | 1:24.304 | 9^{1} |
| 5 | 7 | (Germany) Michael Schumacher | Mercedes | 1:25.302 | 1:24.675 | 1:24.540 | 4 |
| 6 | 1 | (Germany) Sebastian Vettel | Red Bull-Renault | 1:25.011 | 1:24.687 | 1:24.802 | 5 |
| 7 | 8 | (Germany) Nico Rosberg | Mercedes | 1:24.689 | 1:24.515 | 1:24.833 | 6 |
| 8 | 9 | (Finland) Kimi Räikkönen | Lotus-Renault | 1:25.151 | 1:24.742 | 1:24.855 | 7 |
| 9 | 14 | (Japan) Kamui Kobayashi | Sauber-Ferrari | 1:25.317 | 1:24.683 | 1:25.109 | 8 |
| 10 | 5 | (Spain) Fernando Alonso | Ferrari | 1:24.175 | 1:24.242 | 1:25.678 | 10 |
| 11 | 2 | (Australia) Mark Webber | Red Bull-Renault | 1:25.556 | 1:24.809 | | 11 |
| 12 | 18 | (Venezuela) Pastor Maldonado | Williams-Renault | 1:25.103 | 1:24.820 | | 22^{2} |
| 13 | 15 | (Mexico) Sergio Pérez | Sauber-Ferrari | 1:25.300 | 1:24.901 | | 12 |
| 14 | 19 | (Brazil) Bruno Senna | Williams-Renault | 1:25.135 | 1:25.042 | | 13 |
| 15 | 16 | (Australia) Daniel Ricciardo | Toro Rosso-Ferrari | 1:25.728 | 1:25.312 | | 14 |
| 16 | 10 | (Belgium) Jérôme d'Ambrosio | Lotus-Renault | 1:25.834 | 1:25.408 | | 15 |
| 17 | 17 | (France) Jean-Éric Vergne | Toro Rosso-Ferrari | 1:25.649 | 1:25.441 | | 16 |
| 18 | 20 | (Finland) Heikki Kovalainen | Caterham-Renault | 1:26.382 | | | 17 |
| 19 | 21 | (Russia) Vitaly Petrov | Caterham-Renault | 1:26.887 | | | 18 |
| 20 | 24 | (Germany) Timo Glock | Marussia-Cosworth | 1:27.039 | | | 19 |
| 21 | 25 | (France) Charles Pic | Marussia-Cosworth | 1:27.073 | | | 20 |
| 22 | 23 | (India) Narain Karthikeyan | HRT-Cosworth | 1:27.441 | | | 21 |
| 23 | 22 | (Spain) Pedro de la Rosa | HRT-Cosworth | 1:27.629 | | | 23 |
107% time: 1:30.067
| DNQ | 12 | (Germany) Nico Hülkenberg | Force India-Mercedes | no time | | | 24^{3} |

Notes:

- ^1 — Paul di Resta was demoted five places for an unscheduled gearbox change.
- ^2 — Pastor Maldonado was given two five-place grid penalties for jumping the start and causing an avoidable accident during the previous race in Belgium.
- ^3 — Nico Hülkenberg failed to set a lap time when his car stopped on the circuit during the first qualifying period. As he was unable to get the car restarted, he was not allowed to take any further part in qualifying. His entry to the race depended on a special dispensation from race stewards, which was subsequently granted.

=== Race ===
| Pos | No | Driver | Constructor | Laps | Time/Retired | Grid | Points |
|---|---|---|---|---|---|---|---|
| 1 | 4 | (United Kingdom) Lewis Hamilton | McLaren-Mercedes | 53 | 1:19:41.221 | 1 | 25 |
| 2 | 15 | (Mexico) Sergio Pérez | Sauber-Ferrari | 53 | +4.356 | 12 | 18 |
| 3 | 5 | (Spain) Fernando Alonso | Ferrari | 53 | +20.594 | 10 | 15 |
| 4 | 6 | (Brazil) Felipe Massa | Ferrari | 53 | +29.667 | 3 | 12 |
| 5 | 9 | (Finland) Kimi Räikkönen | Lotus-Renault | 53 | +30.881 | 7 | 10 |
| 6 | 7 | (Germany) Michael Schumacher | Mercedes | 53 | +31.259 | 4 | 8 |
| 7 | 8 | (Germany) Nico Rosberg | Mercedes | 53 | +33.550 | 6 | 6 |
| 8 | 11 | (United Kingdom) Paul di Resta | Force India-Mercedes | 53 | +41.057 | 9 | 4 |
| 9 | 14 | (Japan) Kamui Kobayashi | Sauber-Ferrari | 53 | +43.898 | 8 | 2 |
| 10 | 19 | (Brazil) Bruno Senna | Williams-Renault | 53 | +48.144 | 13 | 1 |
| 11 | 18 | (Venezuela) Pastor Maldonado | Williams-Renault | 53 | +48.682 | 22 | |
| 12 | 16 | (Australia) Daniel Ricciardo | Toro Rosso-Ferrari | 53 | +50.316 | 14 | |
| 13 | 10 | (Belgium) Jérôme d'Ambrosio | Lotus-Renault | 53 | +1:15.861 | 15 | |
| 14 | 20 | (Finland) Heikki Kovalainen | Caterham-Renault | 52 | +1 Lap | 17 | |
| 15 | 21 | (Russia) Vitaly Petrov | Caterham-Renault | 52 | +1 Lap | 18 | |
| 16 | 25 | (France) Charles Pic | Marussia-Cosworth | 52 | +1 Lap | 20 | |
| 17 | 24 | (Germany) Timo Glock | Marussia-Cosworth | 52 | +1 Lap | 19 | |
| 18 | 22 | (Spain) Pedro de la Rosa | HRT-Cosworth | 52 | +1 Lap | 23 | |
| 19 | 23 | (India) Narain Karthikeyan | HRT-Cosworth | 52 | +1 Lap | 21 | |
| 20 | 2 | (Australia) Mark Webber | Red Bull-Renault | 51 | Spun off | 11 | |
| 21 | 12 | (Germany) Nico Hülkenberg | Force India-Mercedes | 50 | Brakes | 24 | |
| 22 | 1 | (Germany) Sebastian Vettel | Red Bull-Renault | 47 | Alternator | 5 | |
| Ret | 3 | (United Kingdom) Jenson Button | McLaren-Mercedes | 32 | Fuel pressure | 2 | |
| Ret | 17 | (France) Jean-Éric Vergne | Toro Rosso-Ferrari | 8 | Suspension | 16 | |

- Sebastian Vettel, Nico Hülkenberg and Mark Webber retired but were classified as they completed more than 90% of the winner's race distance

== Championship standings after the race ==
Drivers' Championship standings

| | Pos. | Driver | Points |
|---|---|---|---|
| | 1 | (Spain) Fernando Alonso | 179 |
| 3 | 2 | (United Kingdom) Lewis Hamilton | 142 |
| 1 | 3 | (Finland) Kimi Räikkönen | 141 |
| 2 | 4 | (Germany) Sebastian Vettel | 140 |
| 2 | 5 | (Australia) Mark Webber | 132 |

Constructors' Championship standings

| | Pos. | Constructor | Points |
|---|---|---|---|
| | 1 | (Austria) Red Bull-Renault | 272 |
| | 2 | (United Kingdom) McLaren-Mercedes | 243 |
| 1 | 3 | (Italy) Ferrari | 226 |
| 1 | 4 | (United Kingdom) Lotus-Renault | 217 |
| | 5 | (Germany) Mercedes | 126 |

- Note: Only the top five positions are included for both sets of standings.

== See also ==
- 2012 Monza GP2 Series round
- 2012 Monza GP3 Series round

| Previous race: 2012 Belgian Grand Prix | FIA Formula One World Championship; 2012 season | Next race: 2012 Singapore Grand Prix |
| Previous race: 2011 Italian Grand Prix | Italian Grand Prix | Next race: 2013 Italian Grand Prix |
