= 2012 Japanese Grand Prix =

Race 15 of 20 in the 2012 Formula One World Championship
← Previous race	Next race →

Race details
- Date: 7 October 2012
- Official name: 2012 Formula 1 Japanese Grand Prix
- Location: Suzuka Circuit, Suzuka, Mie, Japan
- Course: Permanent racing facility
- Course length: 5.807 km (3.608 miles)
- Distance: 53 laps, 307.471 km (191.054 miles)
- Weather: Fine and Dry Air Temp 23 °C (73 °F) Track Temp 32 °C (90 °F)
- Attendance: 208,000

Pole position
Driver	(Germany) Sebastian Vettel	Red Bull-Renault
- Time: 1:30.839

Fastest lap
Driver	(Germany) Sebastian Vettel	Red Bull-Renault
- Time: 1:35.774 on lap 52

Podium
First	(Germany) Sebastian Vettel	Red Bull-Renault
Second	(Brazil) Felipe Massa	Ferrari
Third	(Japan) Kamui Kobayashi	Sauber-Ferrari

The 2012 Japanese Grand Prix (formally known as the 2012 Formula 1 Japanese Grand Prix) was a Formula One motor race that took place at the Suzuka Circuit in Mie Prefecture, Japan on 7 October 2012 at 15:00 local time. The race was the fifteenth round of the 2012 season, and marked the 38th running of the Japanese Grand Prix.

Sebastian Vettel started the race from pole position for the fourth successive year at Suzuka, eventually leading the race from start to finish, winning by 20 seconds over Felipe Massa – who achieved his first podium since the 2010 Korean Grand Prix – in second place. Kamui Kobayashi achieved his first and only Formula One podium, the first for a Japanese driver since Takuma Sato in 2004, and the first for a Japanese driver at their home Grand Prix since Aguri Suzuki in 1990. As of 2025, this was the last podium for a Japanese driver, and the last for team Sauber until the 2025 British Grand Prix. It was also the last podium for an Asian driver until the 2020 Tuscan Grand Prix. The race was also Vettel's second career grand slam (leading every single lap from pole position and finishing with the fastest lap of the race). His first was the 2011 Indian Grand Prix.

Following his second consecutive victory, Vettel was only four points behind Alonso in the championship with five races to go after the latter's first-lap retirement. Third-placed Räikkönen amassed a total of 157 points, five points clear from Hamilton. The top five in the Constructors' Championship remained unchanged, however, Red Bull extended their points advantage over McLaren to 41 points, with Ferrari a further 20 points behind in third.

== Report ==
=== Background ===
Michael Schumacher received a ten-place grid penalty for causing an avoidable accident with Jean-Éric Vergne during the Singapore Grand Prix, while Jenson Button and Nico Hülkenberg were both demoted five places for making unscheduled gearbox changes.

Entering the Grand Prix, Fernando Alonso of Ferrari led the Drivers' Championship on a total of 194 points, 29 points clear of the second-placed Red Bull driver Sebastian Vettel. Lotus driver Kimi Räikkönen was third in the standings, and 16 points adrift of Vettel, despite not having won a race in 2012. McLaren driver Lewis Hamilton's championship hopes were becoming increasingly slim as he lay 50 points behind Alonso in fourth place, albeit 10 points ahead of the second Red Bull of Mark Webber and 23 ahead of his own teammate, Jenson Button. Red Bull led the Constructors' Championship on 297 points, 36 ahead of nearest challengers McLaren, 52 ahead of Ferrari and 66 ahead of Lotus with six rounds remaining. Mercedes had lost a large amount of ground as they had just 136 points.

Tyre supplier Pirelli brought its silver-banded hard compound tyre as the harder "prime" tyre and the yellow-banded soft compound tyre as the softer "option" tyre, as opposed to the previous year where the medium compound was used as the "prime" tyre.

In the week leading up to the race it was announced, amidst many rumours, that Lewis Hamilton would leave McLaren (who he had been contracted with since age 13) when his contract expired at the end of the season, and join Mercedes for the following three years. After his three podium finishes for the Sauber team, it was announced that Sergio Pérez would be Hamilton's replacement, and accompany Button, at McLaren. After losing his seat at Mercedes, Michael Schumacher announced his second retirement from Formula One on the Thursday before the race.

=== Practice ===
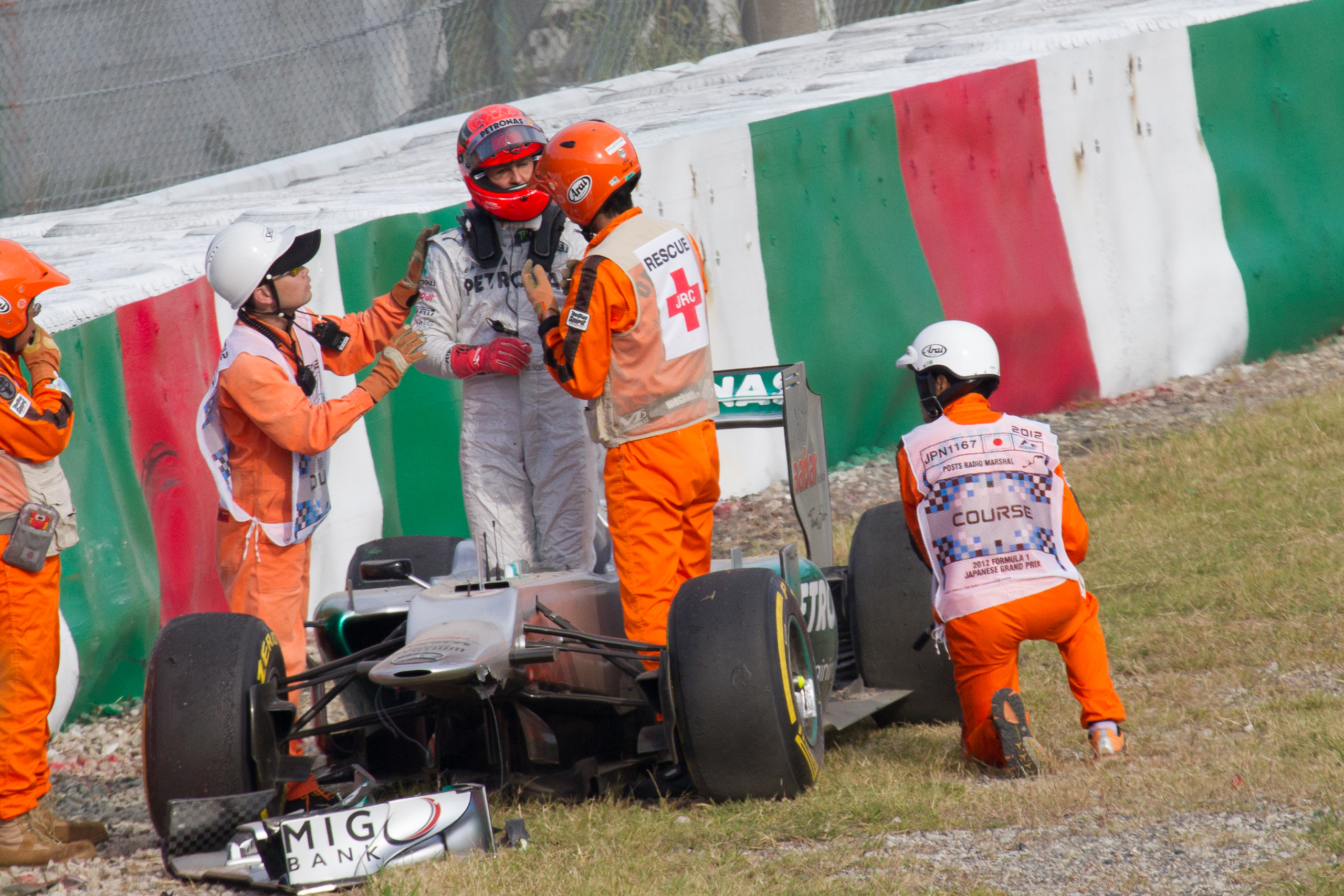
Paul di Resta and Michael Schumacher (picture) each crashed at Spoon curve in Free Practice 2.

Jenson Button and Lewis Hamilton set the first and second fastest times respectively during the first session for McLaren. The Red Bull of Mark Webber finished the session with the third fastest time, three tenths slower than Button's quickest time. His teammate, Sebastian Vettel, finished the session down in seventeenth place. The Mercedes of Nico Rosberg set the fourth fastest time of the session, despite having to abandon his car out on track at the Esses with one minute remaining. Championship leader, Fernando Alonso, was eleventh, ahead of Sergio Pérez and both Lotus cars, who had just introduced their new Double DRS to their car. Williams' reserve driver Valtteri Bottas filled in for Bruno Senna and finished the session eighteenth; Giedo van der Garde did the same for Heikki Kovalainen at Caterham and set the twenty-third fastest time. There were no incidents damaging any of the cars during the session; the most notable things to happen were Michael Schumacher and Timo Glock running across the gravel at Degner, and Romain Grosjean running wide at Spoon.

=== Qualifying ===
The Force India of Paul di Resta was the first car out on track for the first part of the qualifying session, initially using the harder compound prime tyres. The Sauber team also adopted that tactic, and their driver, Sergio Pérez, ran wide at the end of the Esses and bounded across the gravel before wrestling the car back to track. Later in the session, after Sebastian Vettel provisionally set the fastest time on prime tyres as well, Bruno Senna, in his Williams, was impeded by the Toro Rosso of Jean-Éric Vergne. On the approach to the final chicane Senna, on a flying lap, was held up by the slow-moving Vergne and gesticulated wildly out of his cockpit, forsaking his next flying lap in frustration. Vergne was issued with a three-place grid penalty for the race after he made the cut for the second part in qualifying in seventeenth. Vergne said that he had to slow down because he was catching Timo Glock before his flying lap. Michael Schumacher left his flying laps until the dying moments of the session, and after making a mistake at the second Degner curve, he found himself in last place with one last lap to make it into Q2; he was slower than Senna in the first two sectors of the circuit before crossing the line with the sixteenth fastest time, pushing Senna out. The Lotus of Romain Grosjean set the session's fastest time on the softer compound tyres, followed by the two Saubers and his teammate Kimi Räikkönen, who also needed to use those tyres.

Behind Senna was the Caterham of Heikki Kovalainen in nineteenth, albeit with a time more than a second slower than Senna. His teammate, Vitaly Petrov, had a disappointing session qualifying in twenty-third place, as the two Marussia cars sandwiched an impressive HRT of Pedro de la Rosa, with Timo Glock taking twentieth and Charles Pic taking twenty-second. Petrov was, however, only two tenths slower than Glock, but three tenths faster than Narain Karthikeyan who took last place on the grid. As Vergne qualified in seventeenth place in Q2, and Michael Schumacher came to the race with a ten-place grid drop penalty for causing an avoidable incident in Singapore after eventually qualifying 13th – Senna, Kovalainen and Glock started two places further up on the grid in 16th, 17th and 18th respectively, and behind Vergne, de la Rosa, Pic and Petrov moved up one place on the grid to start from 20th, 21st and 22nd respectively in front of Schumacher and Karthikeyan.

Every car used the option tyres during the second part of qualifying. Di Resta complained over his pit-to-car radio after he had to weave in and out of Webber and Grosjean on a flying lap approaching the final chicane. This was not his fastest time, however, as he missed out on reaching the final part of qualifying by just half a tenth of a second, in twelfth place. The Toro Rossos failed to progress in the session in sixteenth and seventeenth, with Daniel Ricciardo out-qualifying Vergne for the eleventh time in 2012, and the Mercedes duo of Schumacher – attempting to save tyres again with a last minute effort – and Nico Rosberg in thirteenth and fifteenth respectively, with the Williams of Pastor Maldonado splitting them. Felipe Massa was the last man out on track at the end of the session, and looked likely to beat Nico Hülkenberg's tenth place time but abandoned his lap and was eleventh. After Hülkenberg elected not to set a time in Q3, his five-place grid penalty for a gearbox change came into effect, dropping him to fifteenth on the grid.

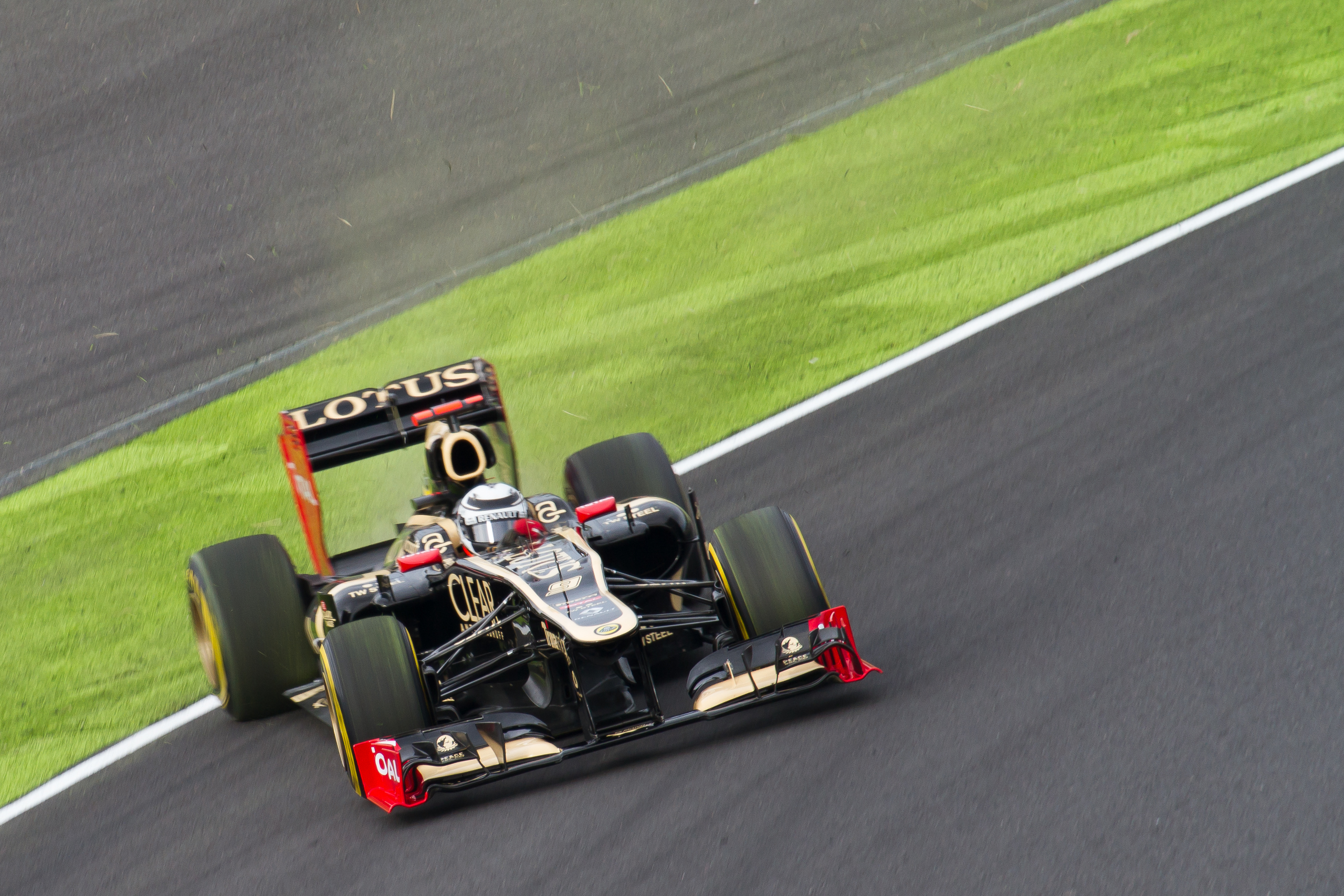
Räikkönen spun at Spoon curve.

The third and final session of qualifying began with a lack of action on track. However, the McLarens, Red Bulls and Lotuses all chose to do two separate flying lap efforts. After the first of these were complete, Vettel and Webber had set the first and second fastest times respectively. Webber was two tenths behind, hampered by an error at the hairpin; Button was third, followed by the Lotus cars of Grosjean and Räikkönen and Hamilton's McLaren, who despite being on a scrubbed set of tyres, was still one and a half seconds slower than Vettel. During the second phase and with time running out in the session, Räikkönen ran wide at Spoon curve, and whilst returning onto the track, spun again and stopped at the edge of the track. Yellow flags were brought out, and Pérez was the only driver in front of Räikkönen who did not have to slow down.

Vettel and Webber were both on faster laps than their previous ones, but were unable improve their times because of the yellow flags. They maintained their grid slots, though, as the team took their first front row lock-out of the season. Vettel claimed his fourth successive pole at the Suzuka circuit, maintaining his 100% record there and, with the 34th pole position of his career, he moved into third in the all-time list for pole positions, behind Michael Schumacher and Ayrton Senna. It was decided by the stewards that Vettel had held Fernando Alonso up during his flying lap, but he was only given a reprimand. Button marginally improved his time, remaining in third place which would eventually become eighth on the grid due to a five-place grid penalty for a gearbox change. Kamui Kobayashi took an impressive fourth place for Sauber, but immediately after he set the time it was suggested that he had not slowed down in the yellow flag area. He was allowed to keep the place on the grounds he had not used KERS or DRS as normal. After Button's gearbox penalty, this became third place, the best ever qualifying position from a Japanese driver at his home race. Grosjean's time was next fastest, in front of Pérez, Räikkönen and Alonso. Räikkönen was sixth, and Alonso said he could have easily been higher up the grid were it not for Räikkönen's spin. Hamilton, who qualified ninth, bemoaned a poorly handling car after a set-up change.

=== Race ===
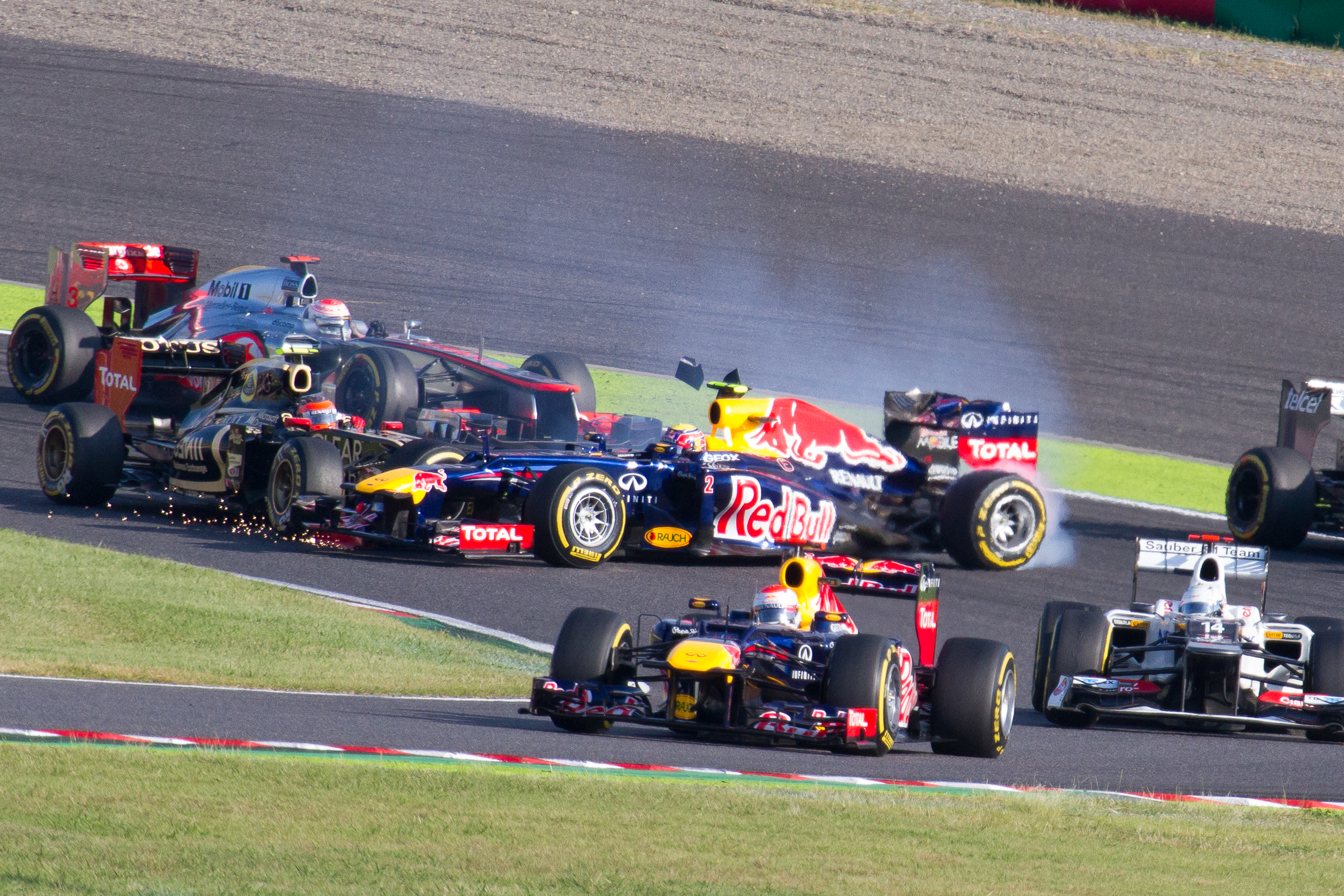
Romain Grosjean was once again the center of controversy when he collided on the first lap with Mark Webber.

It was a bright and sunny afternoon in Suzuka, for the race which started a 15:00 (local time). Every driver except Jean-Èric Vergne, Charles Pic and Michael Schumacher started the race on the softer compound 'option' tyres.

There was a chaotic start to the race as collisions at the first turn brought out the safety car on the opening lap. Vettel led away from pole and Kobayashi had a faster start than Webber, who slotted in behind him in third. Meanwhile, Alonso squeezed Räikkönen and the front wing of the Lotus clipped Alonso's rear wheel, puncturing the tyre, sending him into a spin across the gravel and back near the track at the first corner. Räikkönen's teammate, Romain Grosjean, was too busy attempting to stay in front of the fast-starting Sauber of Peréz on his outside at the first corner, so he ran into the back of third-placed Mark Webber, spinning him round at Turn 2, breaking his own wing in the process. This crash had consequences for other drivers as well, as Bruno Senna attempted to slide into a disappearing gap on Nico Rosberg's inside in order to avoid the crash. This broke Senna's wing and forced Rosberg to retire from the race. Alonso was the other retiree from the crash, seen walking away immediately, as Webber, Senna and Grosjean all had to pit for new front wings. Webber was worst affected as he had to recover from the grass. It wasn't all bad news for all the drivers, though, as Button had made up five places to move into third, and Massa had moved up six places to fourth after they used some opportunistic weaving.

At the end of the safety car period, and the beginning of lap 3, Vettel sprinted away from Kobayashi, quickly establishing a three-second lead and building on it. Sergio Pérez attempted to overtake Räikkönen for fifth place at Turn 1, but he was forced wide and slotted in behind sixth place Hamilton, and in front of Hülkenberg. He managed to overtake Hamilton at the hairpin on lap 6, locking his tyres and creeping around the apex. He then began to move back towards the fifth-placed Lotus of Räikkönen. The Caterham of Heikki Kovalainen was impressing at this point in the race by running in eleventh position. Next, Romain Grosjean was handed a ten-second stop-go penalty for the collision, he took it and returned to the track in last position. It was his seventh collision on the first lap of a race in 2012, and his eighth within the first two laps. By this point, Michael Schumacher had climbed his way from twenty-third to fourteenth, despite losing telemetry to his team.

Vettel and Massa were the drivers showing good pace when Button became the first driver to make a scheduled pit-stop in the race in lap 13. Räikkönen and Hülkenberg pitted the following lap from fifth and eighth positions respectively, having to make their way past Vergne and Kovalainen after their pit stops. Kobayashi pitted on lap 16 to promote Felipe Massa to second place, but kept Button behind him as both were temporarily held up by drivers yet to stop, before promptly overtaking them. Vettel and Massa pitted from first and second on lap 20 and maintained their positions, meaning Vettel had not relinquished his lead, and Massa had leap-frogged both Kobayashi and Button with a quick stop. Pérez attempted the same move he had overtaken Hamilton with the previous time at the hairpin on lap 19, but this time Hamilton moved to the inside line and Pérez carried too much speed into the corner, sliding round and getting stuck in the gravel trap. He was the third retirement of the race. On lap 22, Senna was given a drive through penalty for his contact with Rosberg at the start of the race. By this point, Mark Webber had worked his way back up to ninth place, but had to pit a few laps later.

Hamilton and Kobayashi pitted on lap 31, one lap after Räikkönen, who Hamilton was competing with now for fifth spot. He overtook him at Turn 1 on the following lap. On lap 34, Narain Karthikeyan retired his HRT into the garage due to vibrations in the car. Button, Massa and Vettel made pit stops on laps 35, 36 and 38 respectively, and all retained their positions in fourth, second and first, with Kobayashi in third. Michael Schumacher, who had started twenty-third and opted for a different tyre strategy, was left as the only driver on the softer tyres when he pitted on lap 37. He spent much of the remainder of the race behind the Toro Rosso of Daniel Ricciardo, fighting for tenth place, but never eventually gaining it due to some impressive defending. On lap 41, Charles Pic drove his Marussia into the pit garage with engine failure. Button spent the final stint of the race closing to within one second of Kobayashi, but never managing to overtake the Sauber driver.

Sebastian Vettel took the 24th victory of his career by twenty seconds and became the first driver to take consecutive victories in the 2012 season. It was also the second Grand Slam (pole, fastest lap, and lead every lap en route to victory) of Vettel's career. Felipe Massa ended the longest streak a Ferrari driver had ever had without a podium by finishing second, taking his first since the 2010 Korean Grand Prix. Kobayashi became the third Japanese driver to score a Formula One podium, in front of his home crowd, with his best result of third place. The McLaren cars of Button and Hamilton finished in fourth and fifth places, followed by Räikkönen, Hülkenberg, Maldonado (who took his fourth points scoring result and first since winning in Spain nearly five months earlier), Webber and Ricciardo who completed the top ten. Michael Schumacher and Paul di Resta (who had a clutch failure at the race start) just missed out in eleventh and twelfth. Romain Grosjean retired on the final lap due to a gearbox problem.

=== Post-race ===
As a consequence of his victory and Alonso's retirement, Vettel closed the gap between himself and championship leader to just four points. In an interview after the race, Mark Webber described Romain Grosjean as a "first-lap nutcase" with regard to the collision Grosjean caused between them at the race start.

== Classification ==
=== Qualifying ===
Pos.	No.	Driver	Constructor	Part 1	Part 2	Part 3	Grid
1	1	(Germany) Sebastian Vettel	Red Bull-Renault	1:32.608	1:31.501	1:30.839	1
2	2	(Australia) Mark Webber	Red Bull-Renault	1:32.951	1:31.950	1:31.090	2
3	3	(United Kingdom) Jenson Button	McLaren-Mercedes	1:33.077	1:31.772	1:31.290	8^{1}
4	14	(Japan) Kamui Kobayashi	Sauber-Ferrari	1:32.042	1:31.886	1:31.700	3
5	10	(France) Romain Grosjean	Lotus-Renault	1:32.029	1:31.968	1:31.898	4
6	15	(Mexico) Sergio Pérez	Sauber-Ferrari	1:32.147	1:32.169	1:32.022	5
7	5	(Spain) Fernando Alonso	Ferrari	1:32.459	1:31.833	1:32.114	6
8	9	(Finland) Kimi Räikkönen	Lotus-Renault	1:32.221	1:31.826	1:32.208	7
9	4	(United Kingdom) Lewis Hamilton	McLaren-Mercedes	1:33.061	1:32.121	1:32.327	9
10	12	(Germany) Nico Hülkenberg	Force India-Mercedes	1:32.828	1:32.272	no time	15^{1}
11	6	(Brazil) Felipe Massa	Ferrari	1:32.946	1:32.293		10
12	11	(United Kingdom) Paul di Resta	Force India-Mercedes	1:32.898	1:32.327		11
13	7	(Germany) Michael Schumacher	Mercedes	1:33.349	1:32.469		23^{2}
14	18	(Venezuela) Pastor Maldonado	Williams-Renault	1:32.834	1:32.512		12
15	8	(Germany) Nico Rosberg	Mercedes	1:33.015	1:32.625		13
16	16	(Australia) Daniel Ricciardo	Toro Rosso-Ferrari	1:33.059	1:32.954		14
17	17	(France) Jean-Éric Vergne	Toro Rosso-Ferrari	1:33.370	1:33.368		19^{3}
18	19	(Brazil) Bruno Senna	Williams-Renault	1:33.405			16
19	20	(Finland) Heikki Kovalainen	Caterham-Renault	1:34.657			17
20	24	(Germany) Timo Glock	Marussia-Cosworth	1:35.213			18
21	22	(Spain) Pedro de la Rosa	HRT-Cosworth	1:35.385			20
22	25	(France) Charles Pic	Marussia-Cosworth	1:35.429			21
23	21	(Russia) Vitaly Petrov	Caterham-Renault	1:35.432			22
24	23	(India) Narain Karthikeyan	HRT-Cosworth	1:36.734			24
107% time: 1:38.471

Notes:

- ^1 – Jenson Button and Nico Hülkenberg each received a five-place grid penalty for unscheduled gearbox changes.
- ^2 – Michael Schumacher received a ten-place grid penalty for causing an avoidable accident at the previous race.
- ^3 – Jean-Éric Vergne was given a three-place grid penalty for blocking Bruno Senna during the first part of qualifying.

=== Race ===
Pos	No	Driver	Constructor	Laps	Time/Retired	Grid	Points
1	1	(Germany) Sebastian Vettel	Red Bull-Renault	53	1:28:56.242	1	25
2	6	(Brazil) Felipe Massa	Ferrari	53	+20.632	10	18
3	14	(Japan) Kamui Kobayashi	Sauber-Ferrari	53	+24.538	3	15
4	3	(United Kingdom) Jenson Button	McLaren-Mercedes	53	+25.098	8	12
5	4	(United Kingdom) Lewis Hamilton	McLaren-Mercedes	53	+46.490	9	10
6	9	(Finland) Kimi Räikkönen	Lotus-Renault	53	+50.424	7	8
7	12	(Germany) Nico Hülkenberg	Force India-Mercedes	53	+51.159	15	6
8	18	(Venezuela) Pastor Maldonado	Williams-Renault	53	+52.364	12	4
9	2	(Australia) Mark Webber	Red Bull-Renault	53	+54.675	2	2
10	16	(Australia) Daniel Ricciardo	Toro Rosso-Ferrari	53	+1:06.919	14	1
11	7	(Germany) Michael Schumacher	Mercedes	53	+1:07.769	23	
12	11	(United Kingdom) Paul di Resta	Force India-Mercedes	53	+1:23.460	11	
13	17	(France) Jean-Éric Vergne	Toro Rosso-Ferrari	53	+1:28.645	19	
14	19	(Brazil) Bruno Senna	Williams-Renault	53	+1:28.709	16	
15	20	(Finland) Heikki Kovalainen	Caterham-Renault	52	+1 Lap	17	
16	24	(Germany) Timo Glock	Marussia-Cosworth	52	+1 Lap	18	
17	21	(Russia) Vitaly Petrov	Caterham-Renault	52	+1 Lap	22	
18	22	(Spain) Pedro de la Rosa	HRT-Cosworth	52	+1 Lap	20	
19^{1}	10	(France) Romain Grosjean	Lotus-Renault	51	Gearbox	4	
Ret	25	(France) Charles Pic	Marussia-Cosworth	36	Engine	21	
Ret	23	(India) Narain Karthikeyan	HRT-Cosworth	32	Vibrations	24	
Ret	15	(Mexico) Sergio Pérez	Sauber-Ferrari	19	Spun off	5	
Ret	5	(Spain) Fernando Alonso	Ferrari	0	Collision	6	
Ret	8	(Germany) Nico Rosberg	Mercedes	0	Collision	13	

Notes:

- ^1 – Romain Grosjean was classified as he completed more than 90% of the race distance.

== Championship standings after the race ==
Drivers' Championship standings

Pos.	Driver	Points
1	(Spain) **Fernando Alonso***	194
2	(Germany) **Sebastian Vettel***	190
3	(Finland) **Kimi Räikkönen***	157
4	(United Kingdom) **Lewis Hamilton***	152
5	(Australia) **Mark Webber***	134

Constructors' Championship standings

Pos.	Constructor	Points
1	(Austria) **Red Bull-Renault***	324
2	(United Kingdom) **McLaren-Mercedes***	283
3	(Italy) **Ferrari***	263
4	(United Kingdom) **Lotus-Renault***	239
5	(Germany) **Mercedes***	136

- Note: Only the top five positions are included for both sets of standings.
- Competitors marked in bold and with an asterisk still had a mathematical chance of becoming World Champion.

Previous race: 2012 Singapore Grand Prix	FIA Formula One World Championship; 2012 season	Next race: 2012 Korean Grand Prix
Previous race: 2011 Japanese Grand Prix	Japanese Grand Prix	Next race: 2013 Japanese Grand Prix
