= Charles Pic =

French racing driver (born 1990)

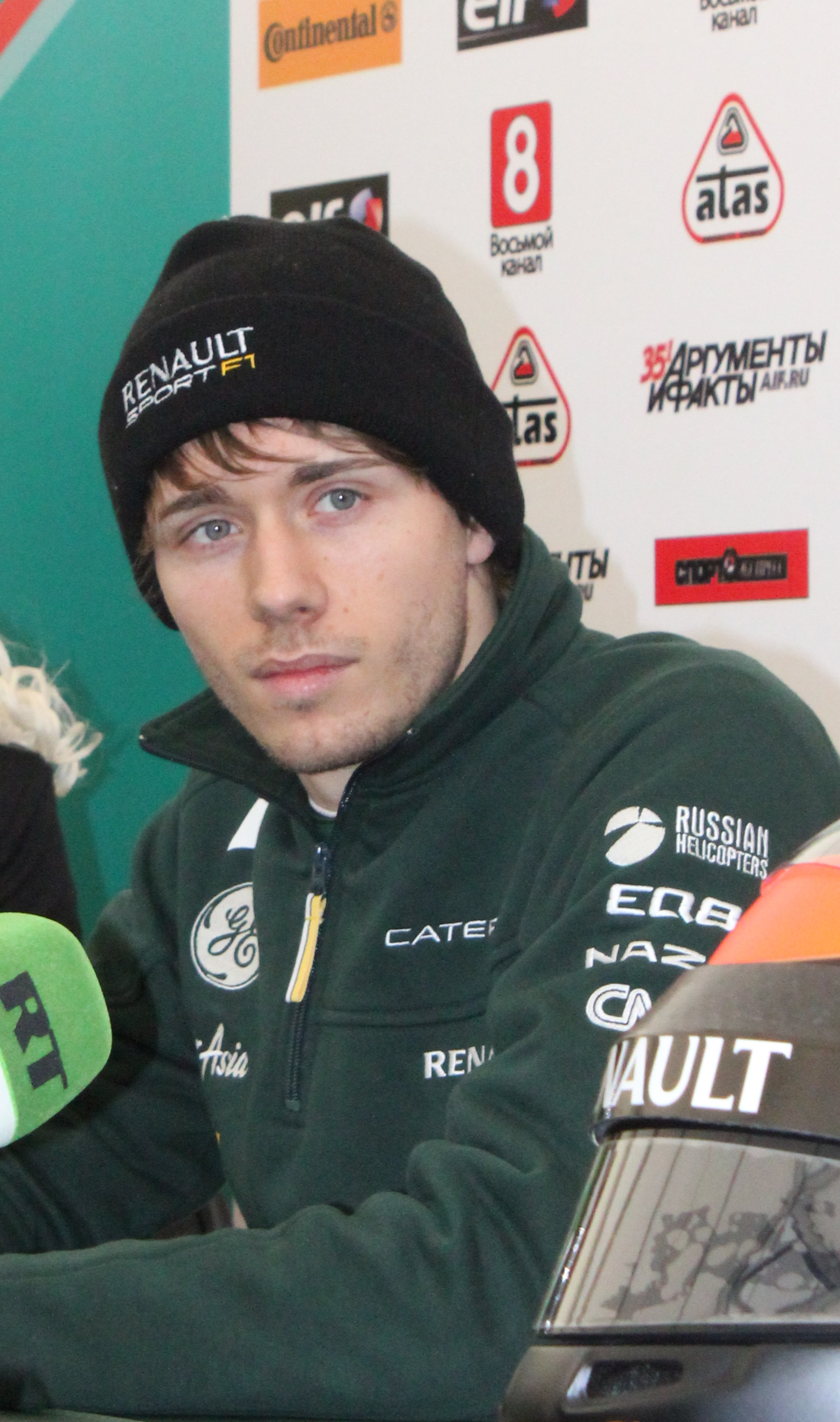
- Pic in 2013
- Born: Charles Maurice Marcel Pic; 15 February 1990 (age 36); Montélimar, Drôme, France
- Relatives: Arthur Pic (brother); Éric Bernard (godfather)

Formula One World Championship career
- Nationality: (France) French
- Active years: 2012–2013
- Team(s): Marussia, Caterham
- Entries: 39
- Championships: 0
- Wins: 0
- Podiums: 0
- Career points: 0
- Pole positions: 0
- Fastest laps: 0
- First entry: 2012 Australian Grand Prix
- Last entry: 2013 Brazilian Grand Prix

Previous series
- 2010–2011 2009–2011 2008–2009 2007 2007 2006: GP2 Series; GP2 Asia Series; Formula Renault 3.5; Formula Renault Eurocup; French Formula Renault; French FRenault Campus

Charles Maurice Marcel Pic (French pronunciation: [ʃɑʁl ˈpik]; born 15 February 1990) is a French former racing driver and motorsport executive, who competed in Formula One from 2012 to 2013.

Born and raised in Montélimar, Drôme, Pic began karting aged 13 with help from his godfather Éric Bernard, a former Formula One driver. Graduating to junior formulae in 2006, Pic achieved top-three championship finishes in several Formula Renault categories before progressing to the GP2 Series in 2010. After achieving several wins across two seasons in GP2, Pic signed for Marussia in 2012 to partner Timo Glock, making his Formula One debut at the Australian Grand Prix. After Marussia failed to score points all season with the MR01, Pic moved to Caterham for 2013. Another point-less campaign followed for Pic, who was released by Caterham at the end of the season, becoming a reserve driver for Lotus. Pic moved to Formula E for its inaugural 2014–15 season, finishing fourth in the season-opening Beijing ePrix for Andretti but being replaced by Matthew Brabham the following round. He competed for China Racing at four further ePrix, including a points finish in Monaco, but retired after the Berlin ePrix.

Upon his retirement from motor racing, Pic moved into business and asset management. Since 2022, Pic has maintained full ownership of French racing team DAMS, who have competed in FIA Formula 2.

== Early career ==
=== Karting and Formula Renault ===
Born in Montélimar, France, Pic entered karting at a late age of thirteen years. With the help of his godfather Éric Bernard, Pic achieved "strong results" in Italian and French championships and in 2005 won the Andrea Margutti Trophy in the Junior class.

In 2006, Pic made his Formula Renault debut, racing for La Filière. He finished the season as third and also became the rookie champion.

=== Formula Renault 3.5 Series ===
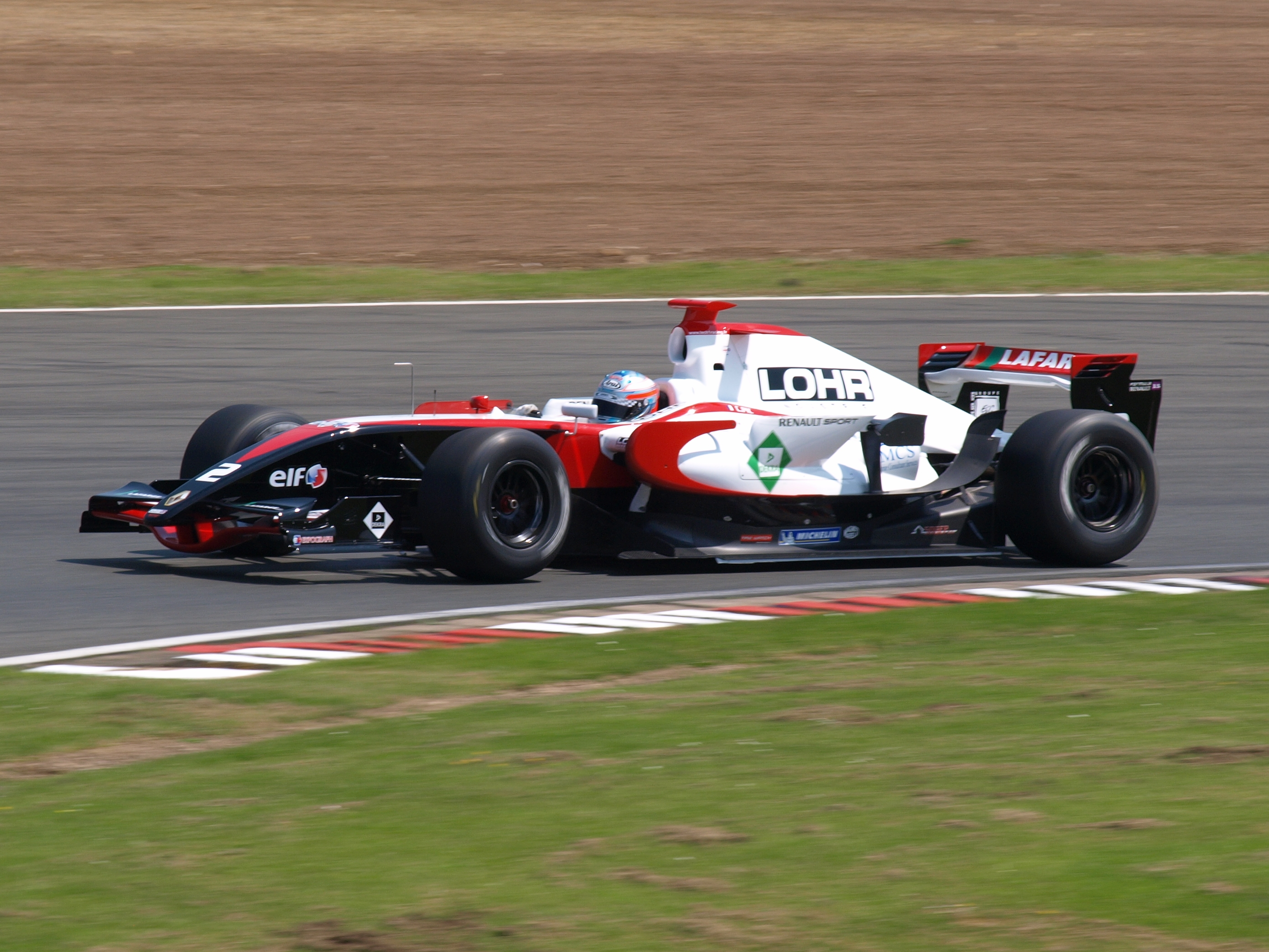
Pic competing at the Silverstone round of the 2008 Formula Renault 3.5 Series season

For 2008, Pic moved to Tech 1 Racing to contest the Formula Renault 3.5 Series. He was partnered by Julien Jousse and finished sixth in the points thanks to two wins at Circuit de Monaco – having dominated the entire weekend with pole position and fastest lap – and at Le Mans. He remained with Tech 1 for the following season and won twice more, at Silverstone and the Nürburgring, which helped him to finish third in the final standings. In 2009, he was also a member of the Renault Driver Development Programme.

=== GP2 Series ===
At the end of 2009, Pic switched to the 2009–10 GP2 Asia Series season with Arden International, and remained with the team into the 2010 GP2 Series season. Pic won on debut with the British outfit during the Asia Series' season-opener at Bahrain, before repeating the feat in the main series at the start of 2010 at Circuit de Catalunya. He eventually finished tenth in the drivers' standings.

For 2011, Pic moved to the Barwa Addax squad alongside future Formula 1 team-mate Giedo van der Garde. Despite failing to score any points in the preceding Asia Series campaign, he hit back with a second career GP2 win at Catalunya where he led home van der Garde for an Addax one-two finish. Another victory, this time on the streets of Monaco, helped move him up to third place in the drivers' championship. The two points he then scored for taking pole position at Valencia briefly moved him into the championship lead but, after retiring from both races and dropping back in the standings as a result, he eventually finished the season fourth overall, three points clear of van der Garde.

== Formula One ==
In November 2011, Pic made his debut at the wheel of a Formula One car, driving for Marussia Virgin Racing at the young driver test held at Yas Marina Circuit in Abu Dhabi. He was due to drive for a day and-a-half of the test, but the Virgin team decided to give him a further half-day of running after he encountered engine problems on the second day of the test.

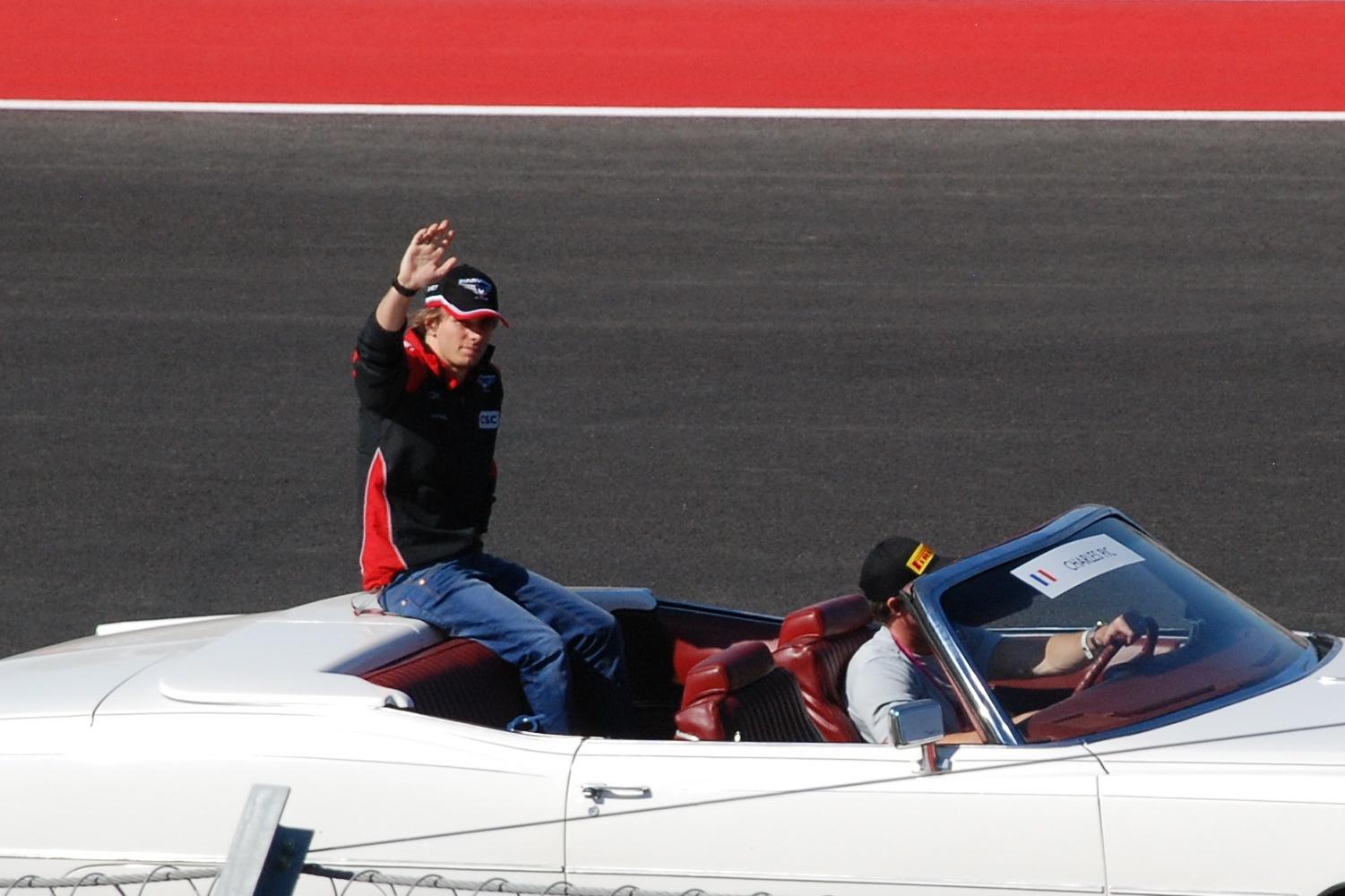
Pic at the 2012 US Grand Prix

During the test, several news sources reported that Pic had agreed a deal to race with the team in the 2012 season.

=== Marussia (2012) ===
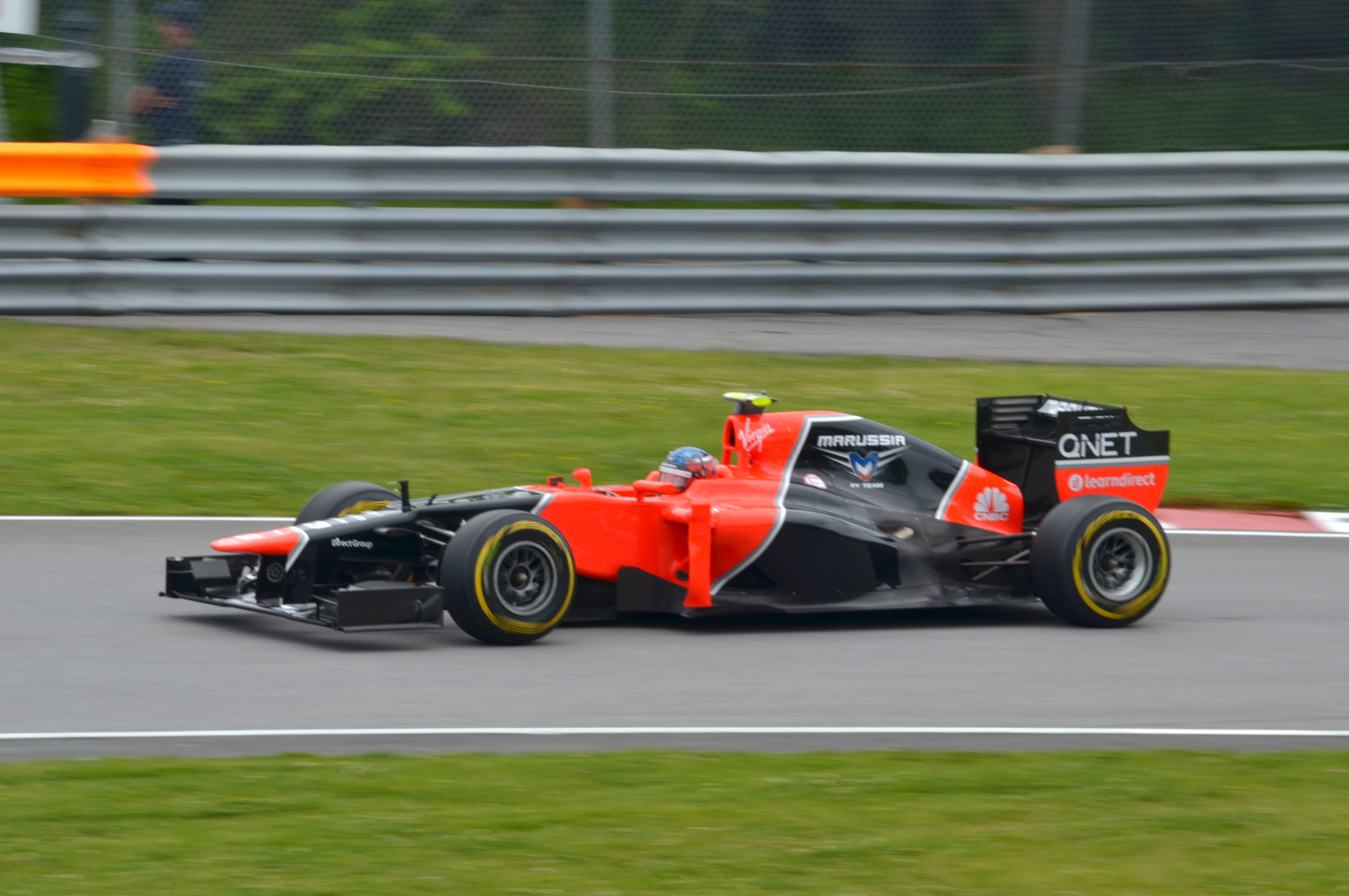
Pic driving for Marussia at the 2012 Canadian Grand Prix

After the conclusion of the 2011 Brazilian Grand Prix, it was confirmed that Pic would indeed partner Timo Glock at the renamed Marussia F1 in 2012. It was also confirmed that Pic would be mentored by ex-F1 driver and fellow countryman Olivier Panis. It was reported at the 2012 Hungarian Grand Prix that a feud was brewing between Pic and his team-mate after Pic blocked Glock during qualifying. He made his debut in the Australian Grand Prix finishing 15th. He however, retired in three consecutive races in Bahrain Grand Prix, Spanish Grand Prix and Monaco Grand Prix. In the next race, the Canadian Grand Prix, Pic finished 20th. In the British Grand Prix, Pic was given a five place grid penalty for changing his gearbox. In the season, Pic was overtaken 70 times, which is a F1 record. Stefano Modena's Brabham, the previous record holder, was overtaken no fewer than 68 times in 1989.

=== Caterham (2013) ===
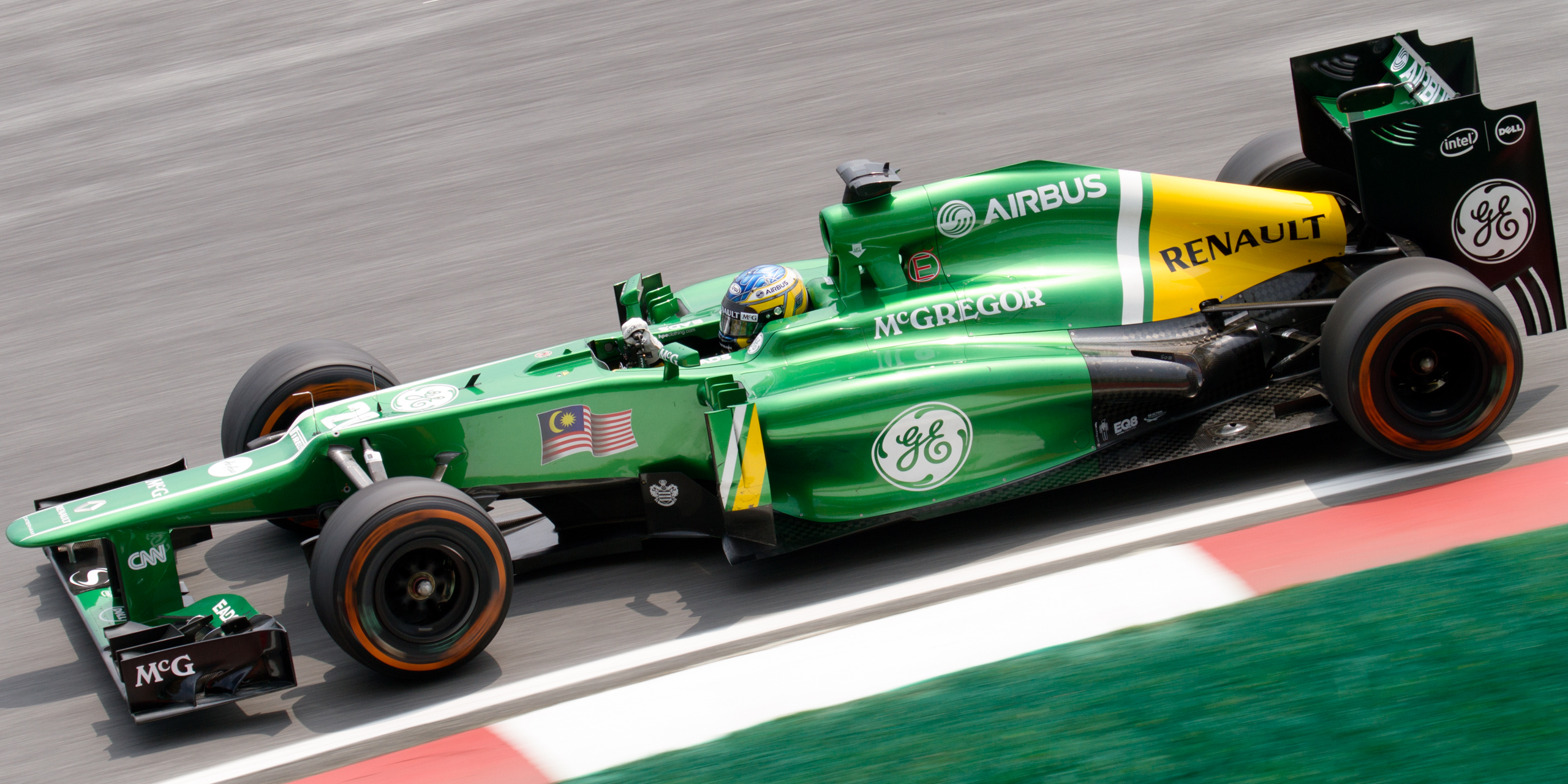
Pic driving for Caterham at the 2013 Malaysian Grand Prix

In November 2012, it was announced that Pic had signed a multi-year contract at the Renault-powered Caterham squad, with former GP2 team-mate and F1 rookie Giedo van der Garde later confirmed alongside him.

Pic made his Caterham debut at the 2013 Australian Grand Prix, finishing in 16th place, then finished 14th in Malaysia where he narrowly lost out to the Marussia of Jules Bianchi.

Pic's season began to gather pace in Bahrain where Pic comfortably beat both Marussia cars and a Sauber, before a major upgrade to his Caterham at the Spanish Grand Prix established Pic as the quickest of the younger teams' drivers. He would continue this trend throughout the European portion of the season, scoring 15th-place finishes at Silverstone and the Hungaroring while displaying pace close to that of the established midfield runners.

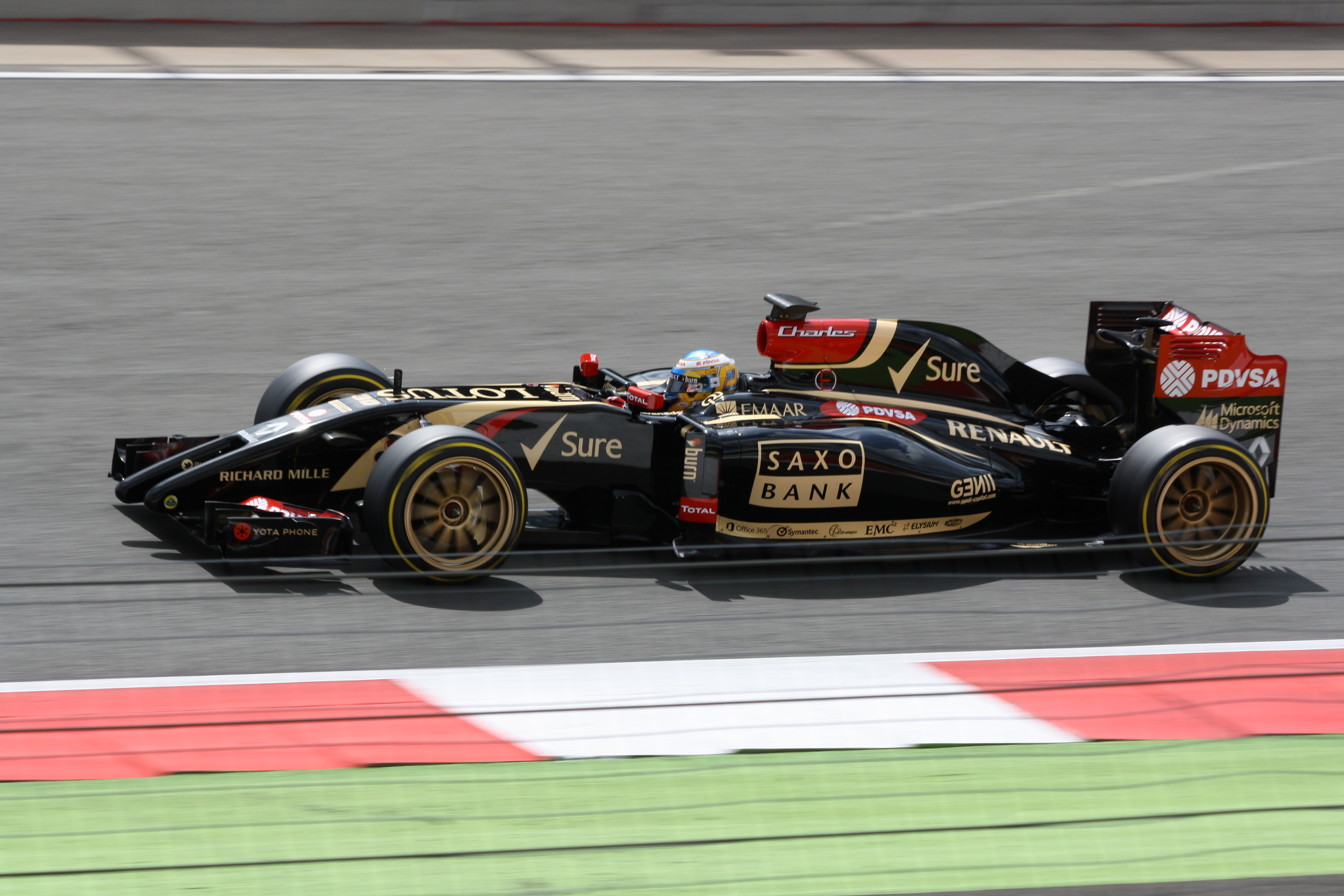
Pic testing for Lotus in 2014

Pic would equal his season-best result at the Korean Grand Prix, taking the chequered flag in 14th spot and within striking distance of Williams drivers Pastor Maldonado and Valtteri Bottas. However, as the campaign reached its final stretch, Pic suffered a succession of difficult races in India, Abu Dhabi and the United States, where balance issues prevented him from extracting the full potential of his car.

Pic recovered well at the season-closing Brazilian Grand Prix, where he qualified over half a second clear of team-mate van der Garde and well clear of the Marussias. However his race ended early when a suspension failure forced him into retirement on lap 58.

On 21 January 2014, Caterham's Team Principal Cyril Abiteboul confirmed that Pic would not be driving for Caterham in 2014:

Unfortunately Charles won't be with us next season. It's a pity that the adventure between Caterham and Charles is ending. On a personal level I want to thank Charles for the work he achieved last year.

=== Lotus (2014) ===
After being dropped by Caterham, Pic signed for Lotus F1 as their official reserve driver. This was announced at the car launch in Bahrain on 20 February 2014.

== Formula E ==
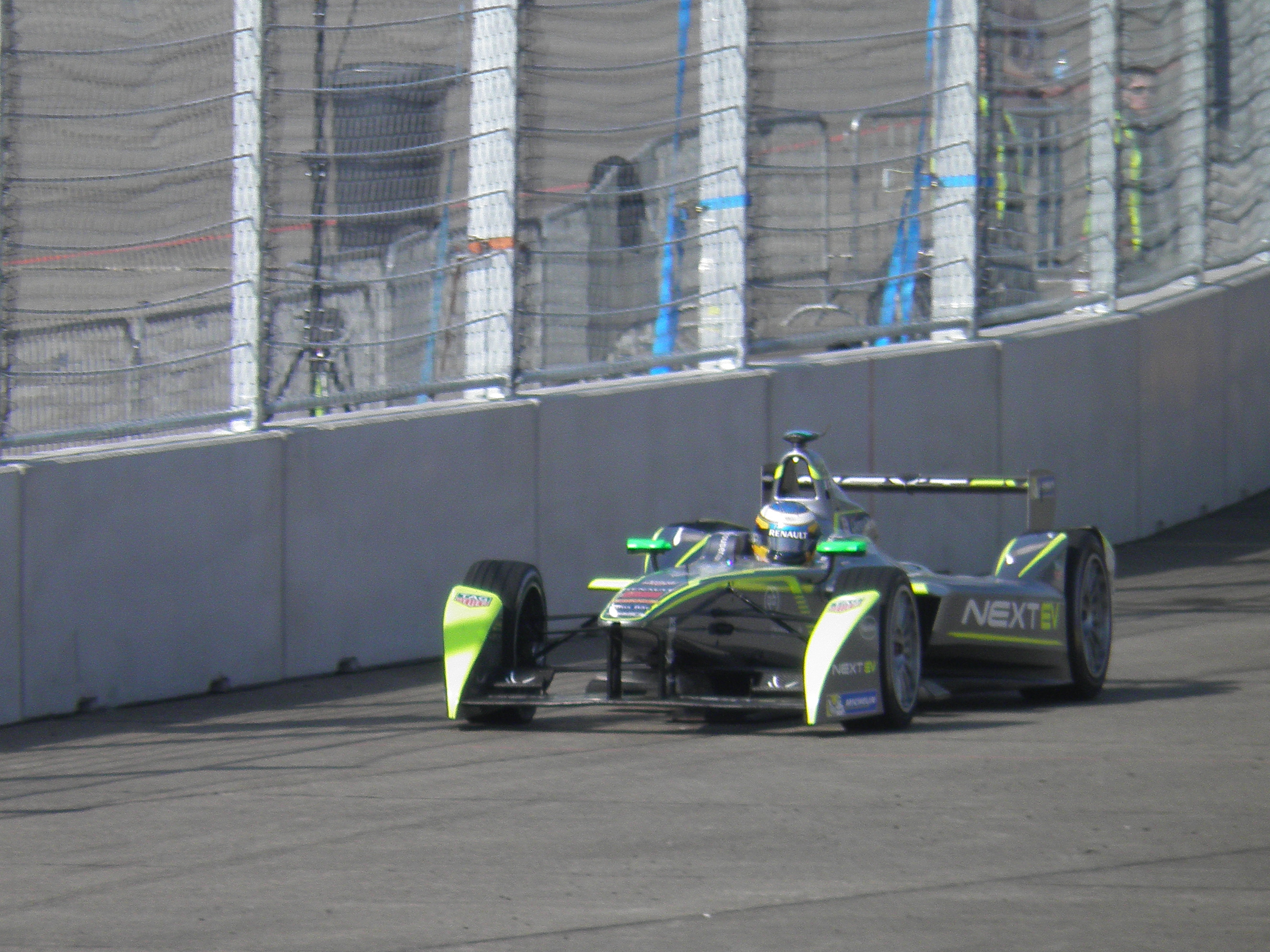
Pic competing at the 2015 Berlin ePrix

Pic participated in the 2014–15 Formula E season, the inaugural season of the championship. He competed in the first round in Beijing for Andretti Autosport and finished in fourth position. Despite this points-scoring result, Pic was replaced prior to the second round by Matthew Brabham. Pic returned to Formula E for the fifth round of the championship in Miami driving for China Racing. He replaced Ho-Pin Tung at the team.

== Post-motorsport ==
In 2015, Pic moved into a management role at French logistics company Charles André Group, of which he is now managing director of the Assets Department.

In 2022, Pic acquired full control of the French racing team DAMS.

== Racing record ==
=== Career summary ===
Season	Series	Team	Races	Wins	Poles	F/Laps	Podiums	Points	Position
2006	Formula Renault Campus France	La Filière	13	1	2	?	8	162	**3rd**
2007	Eurocup Formula Renault 2.0	SG Formula	14	1	2	1	6	88	**3rd**
2007	French Formula Renault 2.0	SG Formula	13	0	1	0	4	69	4th
2008	Formula Renault 3.5 Series	Tech 1 Racing	17	2	1	2	4	69	6th
2009	Formula Renault 3.5 Series	Tech 1 Racing	16	2	2	3	3	94	**3rd**
2009–10	GP2 Asia Series	Arden International	8	1	1	0	2	18	5th
2010	GP2 Series	Arden International	20	1	1	0	2	28	10th
2011	GP2 Asia Series	Barwa Addax Team	4	0	0	0	0	0	18th
2011	GP2 Series	Barwa Addax Team	18	2	3	0	5	52	4th
2012	Formula One	Marussia F1 Team	20	0	0	0	0	0	21st
2013	Formula One	Caterham F1 Team	19	0	0	0	0	0	20th
2014	Formula One	Lotus F1 Team	Test driver						
2014–15	Formula E	Andretti Autosport	1	0	0	0	0	16	18th
2014–15	Formula E	China Racing	4	0	0	0	0	16	18th

=== Complete Championnat de France Formula Renault 2.0 results ===
(key) (Races in bold indicate pole position; races in italics indicate fastest lap)

Year	Team	1	2	3	4	5	6	7	8	9	10	11	12	13	Pos	Points
2007	SG Formula	NOG; 1; 9	NOG; 2; 4	LED; 1 Ret	LED; 2; 5	**DIJ**; **1** Ret	DIJ; 2; 2	VIE; 1 Ret	VIE; 2 Ret	MAG1; Ret	MAG2; 1; 3	MAG2; 2; 2	CAT; 1; 3	CAT; 2; 4	4th	69

=== Complete Eurocup Formula Renault 2.0 results ===
(key) (Races in bold indicate pole position; races in italics indicate fastest lap)

Year	Team	1	2	3	4	5	6	7	8	9	10	11	12	13	14	Pos	Points
2007	SG Formula	ZOL; 1; 10	ZOL; 2; 28	**NÜR**; **1**; 2	NÜR; 2; 1	HUN; 1; 6	HUN; 2 Ret	DON; 1; 10	DON; 2 Ret	MAG; 1; 2	MAG; 2; 10	EST; 1; 2	EST; 2; 8	CAT; 1; 3	CAT; 2; 3	3rd	88

=== Complete Formula Renault 3.5 Series results ===
(key) (Races in bold indicate pole position; races in italics indicate fastest lap)

Year	Team	1	2	3	4	5	6	7	8	9	10	11	12	13	14	15	16	17	Pos	Points
2008	Tech 1 Racing	MNZ; 1; 9	MNZ; 2; 3	SPA; 1 Ret	SPA; 2; 12	**MON**; **1**; 1	SIL; 1; 15	SIL; 2; 13	HUN; 1; 18	HUN; 2; 9	NÜR; 1 Ret	NÜR; 2; 12	LEM; 1; 1	LEM; 2; 6	EST; 1 Ret	EST; 2; 2	CAT; 1; 8	CAT; 2; 8	6th	69
2009	Tech 1 Racing	CAT; 1 DNS	**CAT**; **2**; 6	SPA; 1; 4	SPA; 2 Ret	MON; 1; 9	HUN; 1; 11	HUN; 2; 8	SIL; 1; 7	**SIL**; **2**; 1	LEM; 1; 6	LEM; 2 Ret	ALG; 1; 4	ALG; 2; 2	NÜR; 1; 6	NÜR; 2; 1	ALC; 1; 13	ALC; 2; 11	**3rd**	**94**

=== Complete GP2 Series results ===
(key) (Races in bold indicate pole position; races in italics indicate fastest lap)

Year	Entrant	1	2	3	4	5	6	7	8	9	10	11	12	13	14	15	16	17	18	19	20	DC	Points
2010	Arden International	CAT; FEA; 1	CAT; SPR; 7	MON; FEA; 11	MON; SPR; 7	IST; FEA; Ret	IST; SPR; DNS	VAL; FEA; 6	VAL; SPR; 5	SIL; FEA; 10	SIL; SPR; 8	**HOC**; **FEA**; 3	HOC; SPR; 17	HUN; FEA; 11	HUN; SPR; 9	SPA; FEA; 4	SPA; SPR; Ret	MNZ; FEA; 11	MNZ; SPR; 8	YMC; FEA; 20	YMC; SPR; 11	10th	28
2011	Barwa Addax Team	IST; FEA; 7	IST; SPR; 4	CAT; FEA; 1	CAT; SPR; 19	MON; FEA; 8	MON; SPR; 1	**VAL**; **FEA**; Ret	VAL; SPR; Ret	SIL; FEA; 11	SIL; SPR; 10	**NÜR**; **FEA**; 2	NÜR; SPR; DSQ	HUN; FEA; 2	HUN; SPR; 13	SPA; FEA; Ret	SPA; SPR; 19	**MNZ**; **FEA**; 2	MNZ; SPR; Ret			4th	52

==== Complete GP2 Asia Series results ====
(key) (Races in bold indicate pole position; races in italics indicate fastest lap)

Year	Entrant	1	2	3	4	5	6	7	8	DC	Points
2009–10	Arden International	YMC1; FEA; Ret	YMC1; SPR; 15	**YMC2**; **FEA**; 10	YMC2; SPR; 8	BHR1; FEA; 5	BHR1; SPR; 1	BHR2; FEA; 3	BHR2; SPR; 19	5th	18
2011	Barwa Addax Team	YMC; FEA; 9	YMC; SPR; 21	IMO; FEA; 21	IMO; SPR; 11					18th	0

=== Complete Formula One results ===
(key)

Year	Entrant	Chassis	Engine	1	2	3	4	5	6	7	8	9	10	11	12	13	14	15	16	17	18	19	20	WDC	Points
2012	Marussia F1 Team	Marussia MR01	Cosworth CA2012 2.4 V8	AUS; 15^{†}	MAL; 20	CHN; 20	BHR; Ret	ESP; Ret	MON; Ret	CAN; 20	EUR; 15	GBR; 19	GER; 20	HUN; 20	BEL; 16	ITA; 16	SIN; 16	JPN; Ret	KOR; 19	IND; 19	ABU; Ret	USA; 20	BRA; 12	21st	0
2013	Caterham F1 Team	Caterham CT03	Renault RS27-2013 2.4 V8	AUS; 16	MAL; 14	CHN; 16	BHR; 17	ESP; 17	MON; Ret	CAN; 18	GBR; 15	GER; 17	HUN; 15	BEL; Ret	ITA; 17	SIN; 19	KOR; 14	JPN; 18	IND; Ret	ABU; 19	USA; 20	BRA; Ret		20th	0
2014	Lotus F1 Team	Lotus E22	Renault Energy F1-2014 1.6 V6 t	AUS	MAL	BHR	CHN	ESP	MON	CAN	AUT	GBR	GER	HUN	BEL	ITA; TD	SIN	JPN	RUS	USA	BRA	ABU		–	–

^{†} Did not finish, but was classified as he had completed more than 90% of the race distance.

=== Complete Formula E results ===
(key) (Races in bold indicate pole position; races in italics indicate fastest lap)

Year	Team	Chassis	Powertrain	1	2	3	4	5	6	7	8	9	10	11	Pos	Points
2014–15	Andretti Autosport	Spark SRT01-e	SRT01-e	BEI; 4	PUT	PDE	BUE								18th	16
2014–15	China Racing / NEXTEV TCR	Spark SRT01-e	SRT01-e					MIA; 17	LBH; 16	MCO; 8	BER; 15	MSC	LDN	LDN	18th	16
