= 2012 Belgian Grand Prix =

12th round of the 2012 Formula One season

Race 12 of 20 in the 2012 Formula One World Championship
← Previous race	Next race →
- Layout of the Circuit de Spa-Francorchamps

Race details
- Date: 2 September 2012
- Official name: 2012 Formula 1 Shell Belgian Grand Prix
- Location: Circuit de Spa-Francorchamps, Francorchamps, Wallonia, Belgium
- Course: Permanent racing facility
- Course length: 7.004 km (4.352 miles)
- Distance: 44 laps, 308.052 km (191.415 miles)
- Weather: Fine and Dry Air Temp 23 °C (73 °F) Track Temp 33 °C (91 °F)

Pole position
Driver	(United Kingdom) Jenson Button	McLaren-Mercedes
- Time: 1:47.573

Fastest lap
Driver	(Brazil) Bruno Senna	Williams-Renault
- Time: 1:52.822 on lap 43

Podium
First	(United Kingdom) Jenson Button	McLaren-Mercedes
Second	(Germany) Sebastian Vettel	Red Bull-Renault
Third	(Finland) Kimi Räikkönen	Lotus-Renault

The 2012 Belgian Grand Prix (formally the 2012 Formula 1 Shell Belgian Grand Prix) was a Formula One motor race that took place, at the Circuit de Spa-Francorchamps near the village of Francorchamps, Wallonia, Belgium on 2 September 2012, the first event after a five-week summer break. It was the twelfth race of the 2012 Formula One World Championship, and the seventy-seventh running of the Belgian Grand Prix.

Jenson Button started from pole position, his first pole position since the 2009 Monaco Grand Prix, and won the race. Sebastian Vettel finished second and Kimi Räikkönen third. The race featured a five-car collision at La Source with championship leader Fernando Alonso and Lewis Hamilton amongst the involved drivers, for which Romain Grosjean received a race ban. This was also the 300th race for Michael Schumacher.

== Report ==
=== Background ===
Ferrari driver Fernando Alonso led the championship by forty points from Red Bull Racing's Mark Webber and Sebastian Vettel, with fourth-placed Lewis Hamilton a further seven points behind.

Tyre supplier Pirelli brought its silver-banded hard compound tyre as the harder "prime" tyre and the white-banded medium compound tyre as the softer "option" tyre.

Dani Clos replaced Narain Karthikeyan at HRT in the first practice session, while Valtteri Bottas drove Bruno Senna's Williams once again.

=== Free practice ===
The first free practice session began in wet conditions. Kamui Kobayashi ended the session fastest, having chosen to stay out early while other drivers pitted to begin work on their car setup. Ferrari's Felipe Massa failed to set a lap time when his car ground to a halt as he was about to enter the pits at the end of the installation lap. The second practice session saw even more rain fall, and large puddles of standing water on the circuit made running impractical. Only a handful of drivers set lap times, with Marussia's Charles Pic finishing the session fastest. The third and final session on Saturday morning was dry, allowing teams just one hour to complete as much of their testing programmes as possible ahead of qualifying and the race. Fernando Alonso went on to finish the session fastest.

=== Race ===
==== Accident ====
Pastor Maldonado let his clutch slip a fraction of a second too soon and started his race before the lights had gone out, passing the Saubers. Grosjean made a good start and moved up to the inside of La Source, but in doing so, squeezed Hamilton between himself and the pitwall. The two touched wheels, both drivers losing control. Grosjean then speared into the back of Pérez and became airborne, crashing heavily into Alonso, missing Alonso's head by a few inches. Grosjean came to rest at the outside wall. Hamilton crashed into Kobayashi as well as Alonso after Grosjean's heavy impact. Pérez lost his rear wing from Grosjean's hit and touched Maldonado when the accident happened, making Maldonado spin. Only Kobayashi and Maldonado emerged from the crash, Kobayashi with a substantial hole in the side of his car. Kobayashi, who had started on the front row for Sauber, pitted after the accident and resumed in last place.

==== After the accident ====
Once Maldonado recovered from his spin he hit Timo Glock after the safety car restart. Narain Karthikeyan's HRT spun off backwards and hit the tyre wall late in the race after a wheel came loose. After starting the race in 14th, Felipe Massa fought hard to get the fifth place, ahead of Red Bull’s Mark Webber. Bruno Senna had eighth position secured but due to a slow puncture he had to make a pitstop with only four laps left in the race, dropping him to 12th.

Button, who started on pole, was never under threat as Red Bull's Sebastian Vettel fought from 10th to 2nd, ahead of Lotus's Kimi Räikkönen.

=== Post-race ===
Romain Grosjean was fined €50,000 and was given a one-race ban at the Italian Grand Prix for his role in the crash at the start.

Pastor Maldonado was given two five-place grid penalties at the Italian Grand Prix, the first of which was for his jump start and the second for causing an avoidable collision with Glock.

Caterham was fined €10,000 for the unsafe release of Kovalainen, running into Karthikeyan.

Vettel benefited from Alonso's early retirement by reducing his deficit to the championship leader to 24 points; he simultaneously advanced to second in the standings ahead of Webber who dropped down to third after missing out on the podium. Webber moved to 132 points, eight behind Vettel. Räikkönen reclaimed fourth spot from Hamilton with 131 points, only one point behind Webber and fourteen clear from Hamilton. Meanwhile, the top five in the Constructors' Championship remained unchanged, with Red Bull maintaining their lead with 272 points, slightly increasing their lead towards second-placed McLaren by a single point.

== Classification ==
=== Qualifying ===
Pos.	No.	Driver	Constructor	Q1	Q2	Q3	Grid
1	3	(United Kingdom) Jenson Button	McLaren-Mercedes	1:49.250	1:47.654	1:47.573	1
2	14	(Japan) Kamui Kobayashi	Sauber-Ferrari	1:49.686	1:48.569	1:47.871	2
3	18	(Venezuela) Pastor Maldonado	Williams-Renault	1:48.993	1:48.780	1:47.893	6^{1}
4	9	(Finland) Kimi Räikkönen	Lotus-Renault	1:49.546	1:48.414	1:48.205	3
5	15	(Mexico) Sergio Pérez	Sauber-Ferrari	1:49.642	1:47.980	1:48.219	4
6	5	(Spain) Fernando Alonso	Ferrari	1:49.401	1:48.598	1:48.313	5
7	2	(Australia) Mark Webber	Red Bull-Renault	1:49.859	1:48.546	1:48.392	12^{2}
8	4	(United Kingdom) Lewis Hamilton	McLaren-Mercedes	1:49.605	1:48.563	1:48.394	7
9	10	(France) Romain Grosjean	Lotus-Renault	1:50.126	1:48.714	1:48.538	8
10	11	(United Kingdom) Paul di Resta	Force India-Mercedes	1:50.033	1:48.729	1:48.890	9
11	1	(Germany) Sebastian Vettel	Red Bull-Renault	1:49.722	1:48.792		10
12	12	(Germany) Nico Hülkenberg	Force India-Mercedes	1:49.362	1:48.855		11
13	7	(Germany) Michael Schumacher	Mercedes	1:49.742	1:49.081		13
14	6	(Brazil) Felipe Massa	Ferrari	1:49.588	1:49.147		14
15	17	(France) Jean-Éric Vergne	Toro Rosso-Ferrari	1:49.763	1:49.354		15
16	16	(Australia) Daniel Ricciardo	Toro Rosso-Ferrari	1:49.572	1:49.543		16
17	19	(Brazil) Bruno Senna	Williams-Renault	1:49.958	1:50.088		17
18	8	(Germany) Nico Rosberg	Mercedes	1:50.181			23^{2}
19	20	(Finland) Heikki Kovalainen	Caterham-Renault	1:51.739			18
20	21	(Russia) Vitaly Petrov	Caterham-Renault	1:51.967			19
21	24	(Germany) Timo Glock	Marussia-Cosworth	1:52.336			20
22	22	(Spain) Pedro de la Rosa	HRT-Cosworth	1:53.030			21
23	25	(France) Charles Pic	Marussia-Cosworth	1:53.493			22
24	23	(India) Narain Karthikeyan	HRT-Cosworth	1:54.989			24
107% time: 1:56.622

Notes:

- ^1 — Pastor Maldonado received a three-place grid penalty for impeding Nico Hülkenberg in Q1.
- ^2 — Mark Webber and Nico Rosberg both received a five-place grid penalty for changing their gearboxes before the race.

=== Race ===
Pos.	No.	Driver	Constructor	Laps	Time/Retired	Grid	Points
1	3	(United Kingdom) Jenson Button	McLaren-Mercedes	44	1:29:08.530	1	25
2	1	(Germany) Sebastian Vettel	Red Bull-Renault	44	+13.624	10	18
3	9	(Finland) Kimi Räikkönen	Lotus-Renault	44	+25.334	3	15
4	12	(Germany) Nico Hülkenberg	Force India-Mercedes	44	+27.843	11	12
5	6	(Brazil) Felipe Massa	Ferrari	44	+29.845	14	10
6	2	(Australia) Mark Webber	Red Bull-Renault	44	+31.244	12	8
7	7	(Germany) Michael Schumacher	Mercedes	44	+53.374	13	6
8	17	(France) Jean-Éric Vergne	Toro Rosso-Ferrari	44	+58.865	15	4
9	16	(Australia) Daniel Ricciardo	Toro Rosso-Ferrari	44	+1:02.982	16	2
10	11	(United Kingdom) Paul di Resta	Force India-Mercedes	44	+1:03.783	9	1
11	8	(Germany) Nico Rosberg	Mercedes	44	+1:05.111	23	
12	19	(Brazil) Bruno Senna	Williams-Renault	44	+1:11.529	17	
13	14	(Japan) Kamui Kobayashi	Sauber-Ferrari	44	+1:56.119	2	
14	21	(Russia) Vitaly Petrov	Caterham-Renault	43	+1 Lap	19	
15	24	(Germany) Timo Glock	Marussia-Cosworth	43	+1 Lap	20	
16	25	(France) Charles Pic	Marussia-Cosworth	43	+1 Lap	22	
17	20	(Finland) Heikki Kovalainen	Caterham-Renault	43	+1 Lap	18	
18	22	(Spain) Pedro de la Rosa	HRT-Cosworth	43	+1 Lap	21	
Ret	23	(India) Narain Karthikeyan	HRT-Cosworth	30	Wheel/accident	24	
Ret	18	(Venezuela) Pastor Maldonado	Williams-Renault	5	Collision damage	6	
Ret	15	(Mexico) Sergio Pérez	Sauber-Ferrari	0	Collision damage	4	
Ret	5	(Spain) Fernando Alonso	Ferrari	0	Collision	5	
Ret	4	(United Kingdom) Lewis Hamilton	McLaren-Mercedes	0	Collision	7	
Ret	10	(France) Romain Grosjean	Lotus-Renault	0	Collision	8	

== Championship standings after the race ==
Drivers' Championship standings

	Pos.	Driver	Points
	1	(Spain) Fernando Alonso	164
1	2	(Germany) Sebastian Vettel	140
1	3	(Australia) Mark Webber	132
1	4	(Finland) Kimi Räikkönen	131
1	5	(United Kingdom) Lewis Hamilton	117

Constructors' Championship standings

Pos.	Constructor	Points
1	(Austria) Red Bull-Renault	272
2	(United Kingdom) McLaren-Mercedes	218
3	(United Kingdom) Lotus-Renault	207
4	(Italy) Ferrari	199
5	(Germany) Mercedes	112

- Note: Only the top five positions are included for both sets of standings.

== See also ==
- 2012 Spa-Francorchamps GP2 Series round
- 2012 Spa-Francorchamps GP3 Series round

Previous race: 2012 Hungarian Grand Prix	FIA Formula One World Championship; 2012 season	Next race: 2012 Italian Grand Prix
Previous race: 2011 Belgian Grand Prix	Belgian Grand Prix	Next race: 2013 Belgian Grand Prix
