= Seaby =

Seaby is a surname. Notable people with this surname include:

- Allen W. Seaby (1867–1953), British ornithological painter and printmaker
- Mark Seaby (born 1984), Australian rules football player
- Paul Seaby (born 20th century), British motorsports mechanic and executive

== See also ==
- Seabee
