= Ayao Komatsu =

Japanese motorsport executive (born 1976)

- 小松 礼雄
- Born: 28 January 1976 (age 50); Tokyo, Japan
- Education: Loughborough University (BEng, PhD)
- Occupations: Motorsport executive; engineer
- Employers: Formula One; BAR (2003–2005); Renault (2006–2011); Lotus (2012–2015); Haas (2016–present)
- Title: Team Principal
- Spouse: Sachie (m. 2010)

Ayao Komatsu (Japanese: 小松 礼雄, Hepburn: Komatsu Ayao; born 28 January 1976) is a Japanese motorsport executive and engineer. Since January 2024, Komatsu has served as team principal of Haas in Formula One; he previously served as chief race engineer of Lotus.

== Early life and education ==
Komatsu was born in Tokyo, Japan on 28 January 1976 to Keiko and Yuichiro Komatsu. He moved to the United Kingdom in 1995 to study at Loughborough University, where he earned a Bachelor's degree in Automotive Engineering and a PhD in Vehicle Dynamics and Control. He was married to a woman named Sachie in 2010.

== Career ==
=== BAR (2003–2005) ===
Komatsu began his career in motorsport in 2003 as a tyre engineer for British American Racing, and stuck with the Brackley team for two seasons.

=== Renault/Lotus (2006–2015) ===
In 2006 he moved to Renault to work as a performance engineer, starting out on the test team before being promoted to the race team working with drivers such as Nelson Piquet Jr., Romain Grosjean and Vitaly Petrov.

After Mark Slade departed at the commencement of the 2011 season he was promoted to Petrov's race engineer, working with him for one year before partnering up with the returning Grosjean for 2012. Grosjean and Komatsu formed a close bond, scoring nine podium finishes and fighting for race wins at the end of 2013. After a disappointing 2014, Komatsu was promoted to chief race engineer at Lotus, helping Grosjean and the Enstone team score a podium at the 2015 Belgian Grand Prix.

=== Haas (2016–present) ===
When Grosjean left for the newly established Haas F1 Team, Komatsu followed him, becoming trackside engineering director for the American outfit in 2016.

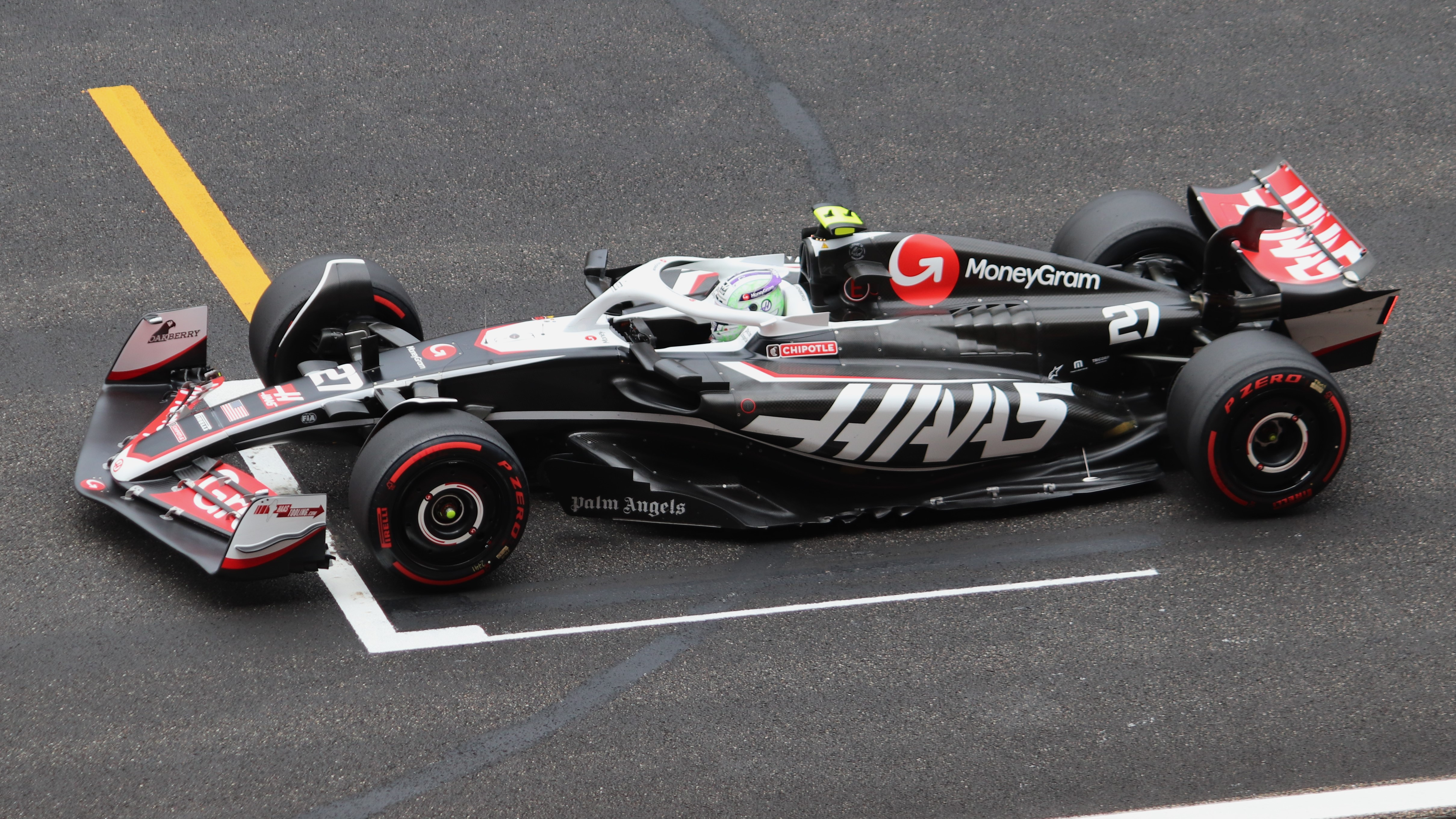
Nico Hülkenberg driving the Haas VF-24 at the 2024 Chinese Grand Prix

Komatsu became team principal for Haas on 10 January 2024, after the departure of Guenther Steiner. In his first season as team principal, Haas finished seventh in the 2024 Constructors' Standings.

== Personal life ==
Komatsu does rock climbing as a hobby.

Komatsu has supported association football club Coventry City since 1995.

== Bibliography ==
- エンジニアが明かすF1の世界 [The World of F1 Revealed by an Engineer] (in Japanese). Toho Publishing. 2019. ISBN 9784809414879.
