= Indian Grand Prix =

Formula One Grand Prix held in India from 2011 to 2013

- Buddh International Circuit

Race information
- Number of times held: 3
- First held: 2011
- Last held: 2013
- Most wins (drivers): (Germany) Sebastian Vettel (3)
- Most wins (constructors): (Austria) Red Bull Racing (3)
- Circuit length: 5.125 km (3.185 miles)
- Race length: 307.249 km (190.916 miles)
- Laps: 60

Last race (2013)

Pole position
- (Germany) Sebastian Vettel; Red Bull Racing-Renault; 1:24.119

Podium
- 1. (Germany) Sebastian Vettel; Red Bull Racing-Renault; 1:31:12.187; 2. (Germany) Nico Rosberg; Mercedes; +29.823; 3. (France) Romain Grosjean; Lotus-Renault; +39.892

Fastest lap
- (Finland) Kimi Räikkönen; Lotus-Renault; 1:27.679

The Indian Grand Prix was a Formula One race in the calendar of the FIA Formula One World Championship, which was held at the Buddh International Circuit in sector 25 along Yamuna Expressway in Gautam Buddh Nagar district of Uttar Pradesh from 2011 until 2013.

The first edition took place on 30 October 2011, as the 17th race of the 2011 Formula One season. The inaugural race was won by Germany's Sebastian Vettel. Jaypee Sports International Limited was the organizer of Formula One racing in India and had signed a five-year contract with Formula One Management (FOM) to host the championship in India.

In August 2013, the FIA announced that the Indian Grand Prix would miss the 2014 edition before returning to an early-season slot in 2015. Subsequently, due to a tax dispute with the Uttar Pradesh government, the 2015 edition was cancelled and its possible return delayed until 2016. However, no resolution was found and the Grand Prix has not since been restored to the calendar.

== History ==
As early as 1997, there were plans to host an Indian Grand Prix at Calcutta. In 2003, India had only two permanent raceways, one in Chennai (Irungattukottai), and the Kari Motor Speedway in Coimbatore. At that time two 600-acre (240 ha) sites in the vicinity of the Bangalore airport were examined. Also, in the state of Andhra Pradesh, Chief Minister Chandrababu Naidu reserved 1,500 acres (610 ha) of land near the airport at Hyderabad. Vicky Chandhok, father of Karun Chandhok, stated in an interview: "Andhra Pradesh is really pushing it like no other state! It is great to see a Chief Minister pushing so hard. Bangalore is a great location, mainly because of the weather". In December 2003, a seven-year pre-agreement to host the GP in Hyderabad in 2007 was signed. The track was to be built near Gopanapally village, near the outskirts of Hyderabad, and consisted of 1,367 acres (553 ha) of land.

However, in 2004 competition arose from Mumbai, to change the location from Hyderabad to Mumbai. Formula One commercial rights holder Bernie Ecclestone expected India to host a Grand Prix within three years, aiming for locating at either Hyderabad or Mumbai. In the end these projects were never realised, possibly owing to anti-tobacco legislation, and a change in government policy. Both projects then were declared "dead" in the second half of 2004, when Mumbai's government decided "not to waste money on car fumes while there are more serious issues", and the Hyderabad location was converted to an IT park for technology companies. However, sites at Mumbai were still being investigated (Gorai and Navi Mumbai). In 2005, Narain Karthikeyan was due to demonstrate a Jordan Grand Prix car in Mumbai, but the road proved to be too bumpy.

In 2007, five locations remained in the running for hosting the Indian Grand Prix: Bangalore; the Gurgaon district in the state of Haryana; a permanent track somewhere near New Delhi; a street circuit in New Delhi, as proposed by Vijay Mallya; and a site in Lucknow, Uttar Pradesh.

Following months of negotiations, the Indian Olympic Association (IOA) and Ecclestone announced in June 2007 a provisional agreement for India to host its first Grand Prix as a part of the 2009 Formula One season. The track would be built in Gurgaon, in consultation with architect Hermann Tilke.

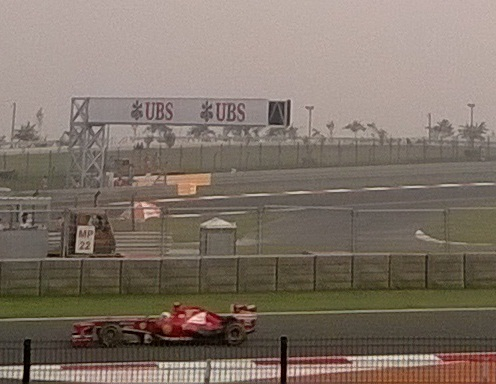
Felipe Massa at Indian Grand Prix 2013

However, in September 2007 it was announced that the debut race would take place in 2010 on the Buddh International Circuit in Greater Noida. After further assessments of the timeframe involved, Ecclestone announced in September 2008 that the Indian Grand Prix had been delayed to 2011.

In October 2008, the Renault F1 team showcased their car on a tour across all the sites which were previously linked to a Formula One circuit in India, except Mumbai: Gurgaon, Lucknow, Bangalore, Hyderabad and Kolkata. In November 2008 they also performed a street demonstration on Rajpath at the India Gate end, New Delhi; the car was driven by Nelson Piquet Jr. In August 2009, the McLaren team showcased their car in Lucknow. On 11 October 2009, the Red Bull Racing team gave a demonstration in Mumbai. David Coulthard drove the Red Bull car across Mumbai's Bandra–Worli Sea Link.

The Indian Grand Prix had the potential to generate around $170 million in revenue and employ as many as 10,000 people. The opportunity in advertising tie-ups between manufacturers and Formula One were also a consideration. The race coincided with the important Diwali holiday, when consumer spending is typically at its highest and many people are traveling, which further improved economic prospects. It was one of the few F1 races at the time that were not subsidized by government, and the venue had to pay $40 million per year to Formula One Holdings to host the event.

The Indian Grand Prix was set to have a one-year hiatus and then return on the 2015 calendar as confirmed by the FIA. Bernie Ecclestone later cast doubt on this, suggesting the race would be delayed until 2016, and this doubt was later confirmed by Ecclestone in August 2014 in Belgium. The Indian Grand Prix was cancelled for the second consecutive year following tax disputes between the FIA and the Uttar Pradesh government. The circuit, despite the placards saying "New Delhi" is not located in the union territory of Delhi, but in the neighbouring state of Uttar Pradesh. The government of Uttar Pradesh, led by the then Chief Minister Akhilesh Yadav said that F1 is not a sport, but entertainment and levied taxes on the event.

== Circuit ==
"The Circuit Official Logo"

The race was held at the Buddh International Circuit in Greater Noida near New Delhi between 2011 and 2013. The 5.125 km circuit has been designed by German architect Hermann Tilke. Four million cubic tons of earth were moved to achieve the rise and fall through the lap. The track is spread across an area of 875 acres, and is a part of Jaypee Green Sports city.

== Winners ==
All Indian Grands Prix were held at Buddh International Circuit.

Year	Driver	Constructor	Report
2011	(Germany) Sebastian Vettel	Red Bull Racing-Renault	Report
2012	(Germany) Sebastian Vettel	Red Bull Racing-Renault	Report
2013	(Germany) Sebastian Vettel	Red Bull Racing-Renault	Report
