= Iñaki Rueda =

Spanish engineer (born 1978)

- Born: Ignacio Rueda; 6 August 1978 (age 48); Madrid, Spain
- Education: University of Colorado
- Occupation: Engineer
- Years active: 2006–present
- Employer: Audi F1 Team
- Known for: Formula One engineer
- Title: Sporting Director
- Term: 2021–2023; 2024–Present

Ignacio "Iñaki" Rueda (born 6 August 1978) is a Spanish Formula One engineer. He is currently the sporting director of the Audi F1 Team. He formerly served as the Head of Strategy and Sporting at Scuderia Ferrari.

== Career ==
Rueda started his career in motorsport when he raced in motocross from 1991 to 1999 while from 1997 to 2003, he was enrolled at the University of Colorado, graduating with a degree in Mechanical Engineering, specialising in Vehicle Dynamics, Controls and Systems.

Eager to work in Formula One, Rueda completed a motorsport master's degree at Cranfield University, UK. Shortly after that, he worked for McLaren Electronics but he wanted to work trackside so in 2005, he joined Jordan Grand Prix, as a Systems Engineer. In 2006 he joined the Renault team, in the same role.

In 2011, Rueda was appointed Chief Strategist of Lotus F1 Team, a role in which he kept until 2014. He then transferred to Scuderia Ferrari as the Head of Strategy.

In January 2021, he took on additional responsibilities on the sporting side of Scuderia Ferrari, thus becoming Head of Strategy and Sporting. From February 2023, he was replaced as Strategy Director by Ravin Jain. From January to November 2024, Reuda went on gardening leave whilst remaining with Ferrari, according to his LinkedIn.

On 30 October 2024, it was announced that Sauber Motorsport, which will be transforming into the Audi F1 Team from 2026, had hired Rueda as its new sporting director. He replaces Beat Zehnder, who took on the role of director of programs and operations. In his new role, Rueda was responsible for overseeing all sporting activities and managing the relationship with the Fédération Internationale de l'Automobile (FIA).
