= Andy Ruhan =

British businessman (born 1962)

Andrew Joseph Ruhan
- Born: September 1962 (age 64)
- Citizenship: British
- Occupation: Businessman

Andrew Joseph Ruhan (born September 1962) is a British businessman. He founded the data-centre company Global Switch and was co-chair of the Formula One team Lotus F1. The High Court found in 2022 that he breached his fiduciary duties as a director of Hotel Portfolio II UK Ltd (HPII) and lied in evidence, and in 2024 that he colluded with Gerald Martin Smith to frustrate enforcement of that judgment.

== Career ==
Ruhan founded Global Switch in 1998 and sold stakes in it to Chelsfield in 2000 and 2002. In August 2004 Bridgehouse Marine, backed by Ruhan and Alan Campbell of Bridgehouse Capital, bought Global Marine Systems from Global Crossing, and Ruhan became its chairman. His data-centre business Sentrum was sold to Digital Stout Holdings LLC (a Digital Realty entity) in June 2012, generating a surplus of about £220 million. He has also raced sports cars.

Ruhan joined the board of Lotus F1 in 2013 and was co-chair of Lotus F1 Team Limited until Renault bought the team back in December 2015.

== Legal proceedings ==
=== Hotel Portfolio II ===
In February 2022 Mr Justice Foxton found that Ruhan, a director of HPII, had secretly bought three of its London hotels through a nominee, Anthony Stevens, and had breached his fiduciary duties by concealing his interest. The hotels were sold in 2005 for £125 million, a fair market price, but their onward sale in 2006 and 2008 produced profits of about £102 million for Ruhan, most of which he committed to a development in Qatar. The judge also found that Ruhan had lied to HPII's shareholders and noteholders in 2004–05 and in evidence in three sets of proceedings, including the trial, and that his original defence in the Orb litigation had been advanced on a basis he knew to be dishonest. Refusing him any allowance for his skill and effort in selling the hotels, the judge described a "conscious, calculated and sustained breach of fiduciary duty" involving dishonesty throughout.

Ruhan was ordered to account for £102.26 million, plus about £60 million in interest to 4 July 2022. He did not appeal. Stevens appealed successfully to the Court of Appeal in 2023, which held that HPII had suffered no overall loss. In July 2025 the Supreme Court, by a 4–1 majority, restored the order against Stevens.

=== Collusion with Gerald Smith ===
In November 2024 Mr Justice Bryan found that Ruhan and Smith, long-time adversaries, had colluded to defeat HPII's judgment. Companies controlled by Smith had obtained an uncontested £850 million default judgment against Ruhan in July 2022. The judge found that Ruhan "paid for the very Ozturk Proceedings to be issued against himself" and that the default judgment was fraudulently obtained. He set it aside, struck out the claims as abusive and ordered assets, including shares in Minardi Investments, returned to Ruhan subject to a freezing order. Ruhan did not attend the trial.

=== Dispute with Gerald Smith ===
Ruhan's companies bought HPII in 2003 from Orb a.r.l., a company run by Smith, who had pleaded guilty to theft from Izodia plc. In October 2012 Orb and two associates sued Ruhan, alleging a verbal agreement to share profits from the assets; Ruhan disputed this and counterclaimed. In 2013–14 his advisers Simon Cooper and Simon McNally transferred assets held for Ruhan to Smith's side, which Mostyn J later described as an appropriation by Smith.

Both sides drew judicial criticism during the litigation. In 2015 Cooke J held that what Ruhan's original defence said about his interest in the Isle of Man structure was "misleading and deliberately so". In 2016 Popplewell J found that the Orb parties were "prepared to mislead the Court and abuse the Court's processes". The case was dismissed by consent in May 2016, after a settlement signed in Geneva.

=== Divorce proceedings ===
In 2017, in financial proceedings with his former wife Tania Richardson-Ruhan, Ruhan claimed to be insolvent because Smith had taken some £200 million from him. Mostyn J rejected the claim to be impecunious and found that Stevens had held assets as Ruhan's nominee and that Ruhan had lied to conceal it. He also found that the assets Smith took had beneficially belonged to Ruhan and that the Orb claims were spurious and abusive.

== See also ==
- Gerald Martin Smith
