= 2013 Brazilian Grand Prix =

Race 19 of 19 in the 2013 Formula One World Championship
← Previous race	Next race →

Race details
- Date: 24 November 2013
- Official name: Formula 1 Grande Prêmio Petrobras do Brasil
- Location: Autódromo José Carlos Pace, São Paulo, Brazil
- Course: Permanent racing facility
- Course length: 4.309 km (2.677 miles)
- Distance: 71 laps, 305.909 km (190.083 miles)
- Weather: Cloudy, Air Temp: 18 °C

Pole position
Driver	(Germany) Sebastian Vettel	Red Bull-Renault
- Time: 1:26.479

Fastest lap
Driver	(Australia) Mark Webber	Red Bull-Renault
- Time: 1:15.436 on lap 51

Podium
First	(Germany) Sebastian Vettel	Red Bull-Renault
Second	(Australia) Mark Webber	Red Bull-Renault
Third	(Spain) Fernando Alonso	Ferrari

The 2013 Brazilian Grand Prix (formally known as the Formula 1 Grande Prêmio Petrobras do Brasil 2013) was a Formula One motor race that was held at the Autódromo José Carlos Pace in São Paulo, Brazil on 24 November 2013. The race marked the 42nd running of the Brazilian Grand Prix. The race was the nineteenth and final round of the 2013 Formula One World Championship.

The race, contested over 71 laps, was won by Sebastian Vettel, his ninth straight Grand Prix victory, driving a Red Bull. His teammate Webber finished in second place in his final race, and Fernando Alonso finished third for Scuderia Ferrari. Vettel established the then-gargantuan records of 397 points total and 155 points margin to second-placed Alonso (these records were surpassed by Lewis Hamilton in 2018 and Max Verstappen in 2023 respectively). Red Bull-Renault won the Constructors' Championship with a then-record difference of 236 points to second-placed Mercedes (which was surpassed by Mercedes the following season).

This was also Vettel's last win until the 2015 Malaysian Grand Prix, Vettel's last win at Red Bull, Red Bull's last win until the 2014 Canadian Grand Prix, and last 1–2 finish until the 2016 Malaysian Grand Prix. This is also the last race until the 2015 Hungarian Grand Prix that neither Mercedes driver finished on the podium, and is also the last 1–2 finish between Renault-powered drivers to date.

As of 2025, this is the last time that Brazil hosted the final race of a season and the most recent Grand Prix in which naturally aspirated engines were used.

== Report ==
=== Background ===
This was also the last race for the 2.4-litre V8 naturally aspirated engines that were introduced at the 2006 Bahrain Grand Prix and the last race for naturally aspirated engines in general which had been mandatory since 1989. In 2014, Formula One introduced 1.6-litre V6 turbocharged power units with larger and more sophisticated hybrid energy recovery systems.

This was the final race for two previous race winners in the form of Heikki Kovalainen and Mark Webber. This also marked the last race for Cosworth as an engine supplier. And it was also the last race for the two Caterham drivers: Charles Pic and Giedo van der Garde, Felipe Massa's last race with Scuderia Ferrari and Pastor Maldonado's last race in the Williams F1 Team. It was also the last race for Williams running with Renault engines and for Toro Rosso with Ferrari engines until the 2016 F1 season. This was also the last race at which the car numbering system introduced in 1996 whereby cars were numbered according to the Constructors' Championship order of the previous year was used. From 2014 a driver would be allowed to choose a full-time number to use for their whole career.

=== Tyres ===
Like the previous Brazilian Grand Prix, tyre supplier Pirelli provided its orange-banded hard compound tyre as the harder "prime" tyre and the white-banded medium compound tyre as the softer "option" tyre.

The teams also tested the company's new tyres for 2014 in the Friday Free Practice sessions. This was also the last race at which the car numbering system introduced in 1996 whereby cars were numbered according to the Constructors' Championship order of the previous year was used. From 2014 a driver would be allowed to choose a full-time number to use for their whole career.

=== Qualifying ===
All qualifying sessions were held in wet conditions. Intermediate tyres were mainly used for Q1 and Q2. Q3 was delayed 45 minutes because of rain, and all drivers started with full-wet tyres, but they ended the session with the intermediate tyres.

== Classification ==
=== Qualifying ===
Pos.	No.	Driver	Constructor	Q1	Q2	Q3	Grid
1	1	(Germany) Sebastian Vettel	Red Bull-Renault	1:25.381	1:26.420	1:26.479	1
2	9	(Germany) Nico Rosberg	Mercedes	1:25.556	1:26.626	1:27.102	2
3	3	(Spain) Fernando Alonso	Ferrari	1:26.656	1:26.590	1:27.539	3
4	2	(Australia) Mark Webber	Red Bull-Renault	1:26.689	1:26.963	1:27.572	4
5	10	(United Kingdom) Lewis Hamilton	Mercedes	1:25.342	1:26.698	1:27.677	5
6	8	(France) Romain Grosjean	Lotus-Renault	1:26.453	1:26.161	1:27.737	6
7	19	(Australia) Daniel Ricciardo	Toro Rosso-Ferrari	1:27.209	1:27.078	1:28.052	7
8	18	(France) Jean-Éric Vergne	Toro Rosso-Ferrari	1:27.124	1:27.363	1:28.081	8
9	4	(Brazil) Felipe Massa	Ferrari	1:26.817	1:27.049	1:28.109	9
10	11	(Germany) Nico Hülkenberg	Sauber-Ferrari	1:26.071	1:27.441	1:29.582	10
11	7	(Finland) Heikki Kovalainen	Lotus-Renault	1:26.266	1:27.456		11
12	14	(United Kingdom) Paul di Resta	Force India-Mercedes	1:26.275	1:27.798		12
13	17	(Finland) Valtteri Bottas	Williams-Renault	1:26.790	1:27.954		13
14	6	(Mexico) Sergio Pérez	McLaren-Mercedes	1:26.741	1:28.269		19^{1}
15	5	(United Kingdom) Jenson Button	McLaren-Mercedes	1:26.398	1:28.308		14
16	15	(Germany) Adrian Sutil	Force India-Mercedes	1:26.874	1:28.586		15
17	16	(Venezuela) Pastor Maldonado	Williams-Renault	1:27.367			16
18	12	(Mexico) Esteban Gutiérrez	Sauber-Ferrari	1:27.445			17
19	20	(France) Charles Pic	Caterham-Renault	1:27.843			18
20	21	(Netherlands) Giedo van der Garde	Caterham-Renault	1:28.320			20
21	22	(France) Jules Bianchi	Marussia-Cosworth	1:28.366			21
22	23	(United Kingdom) Max Chilton	Marussia-Cosworth	1:28.950			22
107% time: 1:31.315

Notes
^1 – Sergio Pérez qualified fourteenth, but was given a five-place grid penalty for a gearbox change.

=== Race ===
Pos.	No.	Driver	Constructor	Laps	Time/Retired	Grid	Points
1	1	(Germany) Sebastian Vettel	Red Bull-Renault	71	1:32:36.300	1	25
2	2	(Australia) Mark Webber	Red Bull-Renault	71	+10.452	4	18
3	3	(Spain) Fernando Alonso	Ferrari	71	+18.913	3	15
4	5	(United Kingdom) Jenson Button	McLaren-Mercedes	71	+37.360	14	12
5	9	(Germany) Nico Rosberg	Mercedes	71	+39.048	2	10
6	6	(Mexico) Sergio Pérez	McLaren-Mercedes	71	+44.051	19	8
7	4	(Brazil) Felipe Massa	Ferrari	71	+49.110	9	6
8	11	(Germany) Nico Hülkenberg	Sauber-Ferrari	71	+1:04.252	10	4
9	10	(United Kingdom) Lewis Hamilton	Mercedes	71	+1:12.903	5	2
10	19	(Australia) Daniel Ricciardo	Toro Rosso-Ferrari	70	+1 Lap	7	1
11	14	(United Kingdom) Paul di Resta	Force India-Mercedes	70	+1 Lap	12	
12	12	(Mexico) Esteban Gutiérrez	Sauber-Ferrari	70	+1 Lap	17	
13	15	(Germany) Adrian Sutil	Force India-Mercedes	70	+1 Lap	15	
14	7	(Finland) Heikki Kovalainen	Lotus-Renault	70	+1 Lap	11	
15	18	(France) Jean-Éric Vergne	Toro Rosso-Ferrari	70	+1 Lap	8	
16	16	(Venezuela) Pastor Maldonado	Williams-Renault	70	+1 Lap	16	
17	22	(France) Jules Bianchi	Marussia-Cosworth	69	+2 Laps	21	
18	21	(Netherlands) Giedo van der Garde	Caterham-Renault	69	+2 Laps	20	
19	23	(United Kingdom) Max Chilton	Marussia-Cosworth	69	+2 Laps	22	
Ret	20	(France) Charles Pic	Caterham-Renault	58	Suspension	18	
Ret	17	(Finland) Valtteri Bottas	Williams-Renault	45	Collision	13	
Ret	8	(France) Romain Grosjean	Lotus-Renault	2	Engine	6	

== Final championship standings ==
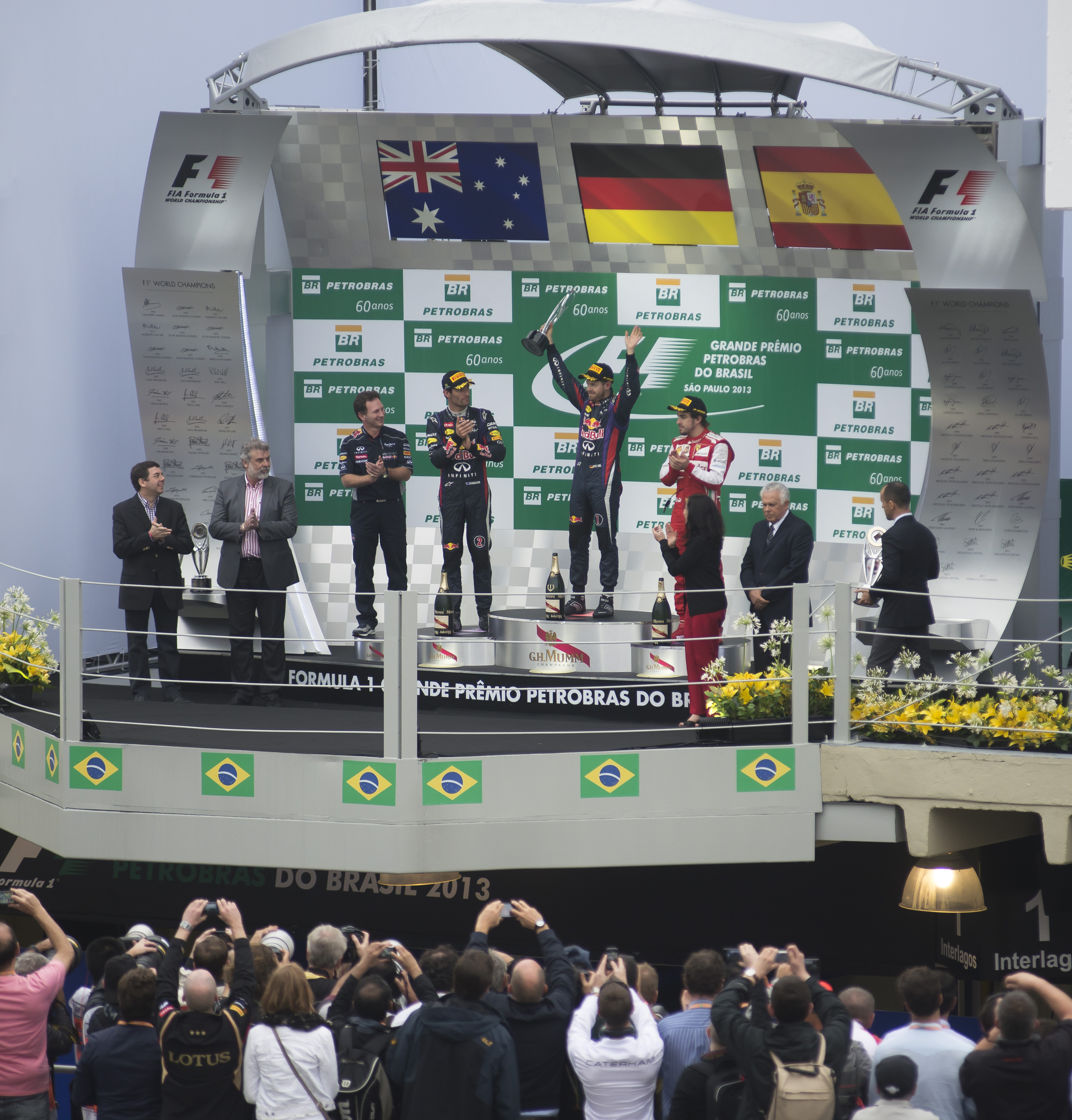
The podium ceremony after the race

Drivers' Championship standings

	Pos.	Driver	Points
	1	(Germany) **Sebastian Vettel**	397
	2	(Spain) Fernando Alonso	242
2	3	(Australia) Mark Webber	199
1	4	(United Kingdom) Lewis Hamilton	189
1	5	(Finland) Kimi Räikkönen	183

Constructors' Championship standings

Pos.	Constructor	Points
1	(Austria) **Red Bull-Renault**	596
2	(Germany) Mercedes	360
3	(Italy) Ferrari	354
4	(United Kingdom) Lotus-Renault	315
5	(United Kingdom) McLaren-Mercedes	122

- Note: Only the top five positions are included for both sets of standings.
- Bold text indicates 2013 World Champions

Previous race: 2013 United States Grand Prix	FIA Formula One World Championship; 2013 season	Next race: 2014 Australian Grand Prix
Previous race: 2012 Brazilian Grand Prix	Brazilian Grand Prix	Next race: 2014 Brazilian Grand Prix
Awards
Preceded by 2012 Indian Grand Prix	Formula One Promotional Trophy for Race Promoter; 2013	Succeeded by 2014 Russian Grand Prix
