= Ravin Jain =

Scuderia Ferrari strategy director

Personal information
- Nationality: British
- Education: Mathematical physics Merton College, University of Oxford
- Occupation: Engineer
- Years active: 2016–present

Sport
- Sport: Formula One
- Position: Head of strategy
- Team: Scuderia Ferrari

Ravin Jain is a British engineer. He currently serves as head of strategy for Scuderia Ferrari.

== Biography ==
Jain graduated from King Edward's School, Birmingham. He obtained a bachelor's degree in Physics and a master's degree in Mathematical physics, both from University of Oxford.

Jain had several summer placement experiences with multiple Formula team, including Caterham and Williams. He joined Scuderia Ferrari as a mathematical modelling engineer in 2016, and worked as that title for six months before moving to a new role as race strategy engineer in 2017. He was appointed as the head of strategy by the team principal Frédéric Vasseur in 2023, replacing Iñaki Rueda, who would take on a new role back in the Maranello factory.
