= Federico Gastaldi =

Argentine businessman

- Born: 1964 (age 61–62)

Federico Gastaldi (born 1964) is an Argentine businessman who served as the deputy team principal of the Lotus F1 Team, in 2014 and 2015.

Gastaldi was promoted to Deputy Team Principal on March 14, 2014, following the departure of former team boss Éric Boullier to McLaren necessitating a reorganization of Lotus F1 team's management. Before being promoted, Gastaldi had been working at Lotus since the year 2010 as Director of Business Development with his most recent role in a long-standing relationship with the Enstone team. Previously, in the 1990s, Gastaldi was responsible for the interests of the Italian group Benetton in Argentina. He was also involved in conducting the Argentine Grand Prix between 1995 and 1998.
