= Advanced Global Trading =

Alternative investments company of UAE

- Type: Alternative Investments
- Industry: Emissions
- Founded: 2009 – ceased trading 4 July 2013
- Headquarters: Dubai, Dubai, United Arab Emirates
- Area served: GCC, Europe, Africa, and North America
- Key people: Charles Stephenson (Director, Head Office)
- Products: VER, CSR, OTC, SCCC
- Number of employees: 100 (2013)

Advanced Global Trading (AGT) was an emissions trading and environmental consultancy firm headquartered in Dubai, United Arab Emirates and with offices in Bahrain, Doha, Zurich and Johannesburg. AGT deals in sourcing and trading of Verified Carbon Standard approved emissions trading permits (ETP), and specialised in buying and selling of emissions trading certificates and permits in the over-the-counter markets.

== History ==
Advanced Global Trading was set up by a group of investors and angel investors in 2009 with headquarters in the Dubai, United Arab Emirates. AGT traded within the UAE and Gulf Cooperation Council regions. It later expanded into consultancy.

In August 2011 the company established a partnership with Equinox Designs to offset the environmental waste created by the exhibition industry. AMEinfo.com estimated the total offset to be over 200,000 tonnes a year in the UAE alone. Lotus F1 also signed Advanced Global Trading as an official partner to reduce their environmental impact. The partnership is represented by the AGT brand, which appears on the Lotus F1 car driven by Kimi Räikkönen and Romain Grosjean.

In December 2012, the company signed an agreement with the cleaning specialist Grako in Dubai, to become the country's first carbon neutral company

AGT’s growth faltered in 2013. Online records at the Dubai Department of Economic Development show that the firm’s carbon-trading licence expired in early June 2013, after which at least five investors filed complaints alleging that they could not liquidate their holdings. Trading activities ceased soon afterwards and the licence was not renewed.

== Corporate social responsibility ==
AGT initiated a campaign to embed CO_{2} CSR strategies into the corporate governance frameworks in the Middle East.

in June 2011, AGT assisted Omar Samra, the first Egyptian to climb Mount Everest in making his expeditions carbon neutral.

In 2011, the company advised Equinox Design's Exhibit Green division to offset environmental waste and reduce their carbon footprint.

Same year, the company helped the Swiss Le Mans race to become carbon neutral by retiring ETPs.

Advanced Global Trading assisted Abu Dhabi Desert Challenge to offset any environmental damage from the March 2012 event. The agreement was between (ATCUAE) Automobile & Touring Club and AGT and was the first of its kind in GCC.

Advanced Global Trading in May 2012 announced its official partnership with Lotus F1 to assist the team's reduction of CO_{2} emissions as it targets CO_{2} neutrality in 2012. The company assisted Lotus F1 with carbon neutrality for another year in 2013.

== Criticism ==
Specialist commentators frequently questioned AGT’s pricing and resale claims. In May 2013 The National highlighted cases in which investors had been unable for months to off-load credits purchased at up to US$15 each—more than triple prevailing wholesale values—prompting warnings that the voluntary market was “illiquid, volatile and poorly understood”. A follow-up investigation in June 2013 reported that AGT’s trading licence had lapsed and that consumer complaints were under examination by Dubai’s Department of Economic Development.

== Awards and recognition ==
AGT was nominated for "Best Sustainable Investment" award at the 2011 International Green Awards.
