= 2012 United States Grand Prix =

Race 19 of 20 in the 2012 Formula One World Championship
← Previous race	Next race →
- Layout of the Circuit of the Americas

Race details
- Date: November 18, 2012
- Official name: 2012 Formula 1 United States Grand Prix
- Location: Circuit of the Americas; Travis County, Austin, Texas
- Course: Permanent racing facility
- Course length: 5.513 km (3.426 miles)
- Distance: 56 laps, 308.405 km (191.634 miles)
- Weather: Scattered clouds Air temp 24 °C (75 °F); Track temp 32 °C (90 °F)
- Attendance: 265,000 (Weekend) 117,429 (Race Day)

Pole position
Driver	(Germany) Sebastian Vettel	Red Bull-Renault
- Time: 1:35.657

Fastest lap
Driver	(Germany) Sebastian Vettel	Red Bull-Renault
- Time: 1:39.347 on lap 56

Podium
First	(United Kingdom) Lewis Hamilton	McLaren-Mercedes
Second	(Germany) Sebastian Vettel	Red Bull-Renault
Third	(Spain) Fernando Alonso	Ferrari

The 2012 United States Grand Prix (formally the 2012 Formula 1 United States Grand Prix) was a Formula One motor race held at the Circuit of the Americas in Travis County, near Austin, Texas on November 18, 2012. The race, run over fifty-six laps, was the penultimate round of the 2012 championship. It was the inaugural race at the circuit, and the first time the United States Grand Prix had been held since 2007. On Sunday a capacity crowd of 117,429 watched the race around the brand new 20-turn circuit. Sebastian Vettel started the race from pole position. Lewis Hamilton won the race, his last for McLaren before his move to Mercedes, with Vettel finishing second and Fernando Alonso in third. It was the first time in history that the trio of Hamilton, Vettel, and Alonso were together on the podium.

== Report ==
=== Background ===
After a troubled construction period that saw a stop-work order issued in November 2011, and the threat of the race being removed from the Formula One calendar altogether, construction laid the final layer of tarmac on September 21. The circuit passed its final pre-race inspection on September 25, allowing the race to go ahead as planned. By comparison, the most-recent additions to the Formula One calendar – the Korea International Circuit in South Korea and the Buddh International Circuit in India – were only completed in the days leading up to their inaugural races. The event was not the first Formula One Grand Prix in the state of Texas- the one-off Dallas Grand Prix was held in July 1984 and the event was run in the extremely high temperatures of a Texas summer.

Tyre supplier Pirelli provided teams with the medium and hard compounds for the race, with the hard tyre designated the prime compound, and the medium tyre the option compound. As a result of this, Pirelli's Paul Hembery predicted that the race would feature one-stop strategies throughout the field. The selection of tyres was criticised by teams and drivers for being too conservative and counter-productive to racing, though Pirelli claimed that this was a result of the highly-specific chemical makeup of the tarmac used at circuits hosting Grands Prix. After analysing data gathered in free practice on Friday, Pirelli admitted that the soft and super-soft compounds would have been better-suited to the characteristics of the circuit.

The race saw the use of a single Drag Reduction System (DRS) zone, located along the back straight to facilitate overtaking into Turn 12. The detection point was located 1,220 feet (372 m) before the apex of the Turn 11 hairpin, with the activation point positioned 1,050 feet (320 m) after the Turn 11 apex, making the total DRS zone some 2,130 feet (649 m) in length.

=== Free practice ===
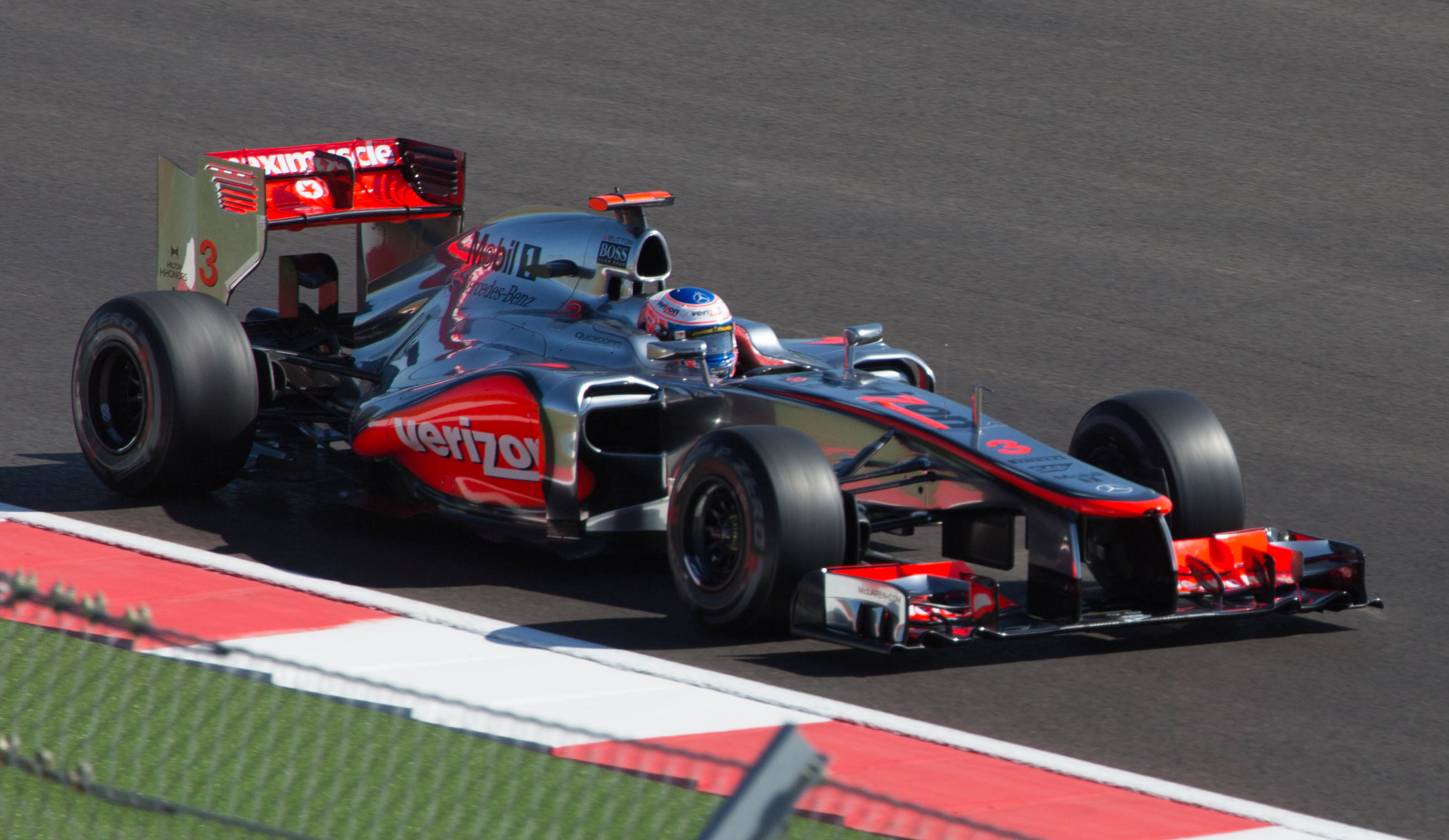
Jenson Button during the Friday practice. McLaren cars ran with Verizon logos instead of Vodafone in North America.

Sebastian Vettel was the fastest driver in both the opening practice sessions, setting a time a second and a half faster than Lewis Hamilton in the Friday morning session, and two seconds faster than title rival Fernando Alonso. The session was run without incident, though drivers reported that there was very little grip around the circuit. Ma Qinghua was the only reserve driver to take part in the session, replacing Narain Karthikeyan at HRT. He finished the session in twenty-fourth and last position, ten seconds behind Vettel.

Vettel was again fastest in the Friday afternoon session, seven tenths of a second quicker than team-mate Mark Webber and Alonso. Vettel's running was limited by a water leak that forced him to spend half the session in the pits, while Caterham's Heikki Kovalainen suffered a puncture when he made contact with Scuderia Toro Rosso driver Jean-Éric Vergne, and Pastor Maldonado suffered an engine failure in his Williams late in the session.

Vettel completed the trifecta of fastest lap times when he topped the final session on Saturday morning, finishing two and a half tenths of a second faster than Hamilton. The hour-long session was marked by a collision between Sauber's Sergio Pérez and the Marussia of Charles Pic that damaged the floor of Pic's car. Pérez escaped without penalty, much to the chagrin of Marussia. Jean-Éric Vergne also ran into further trouble, breaking his front suspension when he hit a kerb and stopped on the circuit.

=== Qualifying ===
Qualifying was held over one hour on Saturday afternoon. The session was broken up into three periods of twenty minutes, fifteen minutes and ten minutes respectively. At the end of the first period, Q1, the slowest seven cars were eliminated, and would start the race from the last seven positions on the grid. Any car that failed to qualify within 107% of the fastest lap time recorded in Q1 would have failed to qualify, though they would be eligible to enter the race at the discretion of the stewards. At the end of the second period, Q2, the slowest seven cars were again eliminated and would start the race in positions eleven to seventeen. This would leave the ten fastest cars to compete for pole position in the final ten-minute period, Q3.

==== Q1 ====
With the surface of the circuit offering very little grip, every team sent their drivers out for extended runs in the first twenty-minute period of qualifying, with the objective of laying down enough rubber on the circuit to improve their overall lap time, and trying to time their final flying runs to take full advantage of the circuit.

HRT were initially concerned that they would fail to qualify inside the 107% cut-off, and therefore fail to qualify for the race. These fears were not realised as they sent Pedro de la Rosa and Narain Karthikeyan out on the softer option tyres, allowing them to record faster lap times than if they had used the harder prime compound, which most of the front-runners would use in the first period so as to keep a set of soft tyres in reserve. Both de la Rosa and Karthikeyan qualified for the race, filling out the final row of the grid. Karthikeyan's session ended early when he pulled over onto the tarmac run-off at Turn 2, the victim of a mechanical fault. The positioning of his car forced race control to show yellow flags in the first sector, obliging drivers to slow down to avoid an accident.

Caterham's Vitaly Petrov struggled early in the session with traffic, and spent most of the twenty minutes outside the 107% cut-off. His final flying lap saw him qualify twenty-first for the race, one place ahead of team-mate Heikki Kovalainen. It was only the sixth time in eighteen races that Petrov had out-qualified his team-mate. Caterham later claimed that Karthikeyan's stoppage robbed them of the chance to set faster times, and the net result was that both Caterham cars qualified behind the Marussias of Timo Glock and Charles Pic, prompting the team to declare that they had now caught Caterham in terms of raw pace.

Daniel Ricciardo was the seventh and final driver eliminated at the end of the first qualifying period. He had spent most of the twenty minutes engaged in a battle to avoid elimination with Mercedes' Nico Rosberg, with Rosberg prevailing when Ricciardo's final lap was compromised by the yellow flags in the first sector. The result meant that a Scuderia Toro Rosso was eliminated in the first qualifying period for the tenth time in 2012, though it was only Ricciardo's second elimination.

==== Q2 ====
The trend towards the circuit becoming faster as more rubber was laid down continued in Q2, with lap times continuing to drop. Sebastian Vettel, who had recorded the fastest time in Q1, went on to beat his best time by eight tenths of a second in Q2. The faster lap times now meant that the softer option compound was a necessity; predictions from the teams – which would soon prove to be accurate – suggested that it would be impossible to advance to the final period of qualifying using the harder prime tyres.

Despite narrowly beating Ricciardo in Q1, Nico Rosberg was unable to improve his time in Q2, and qualified in seventeenth overall. His team later defended the decision to have him compete in an older specification of the Mercedes F1 W03 as they felt it was better-suited to Rosberg's driving style, particularly when it came to heating his tyres. The Saubers of Pérez and Kamui Kobayashi filled out the eighth row of the grid, with the team unable to explain their lack of pace despite early predictions that they could challenge Mercedes for fifth place in the World Constructors' Championship in Austin and Brazil.

Jean-Éric Vergne overcame his free practice dramas to qualify fourteenth, two tenths of a second ahead of Pérez and two tenths of a second behind Paul di Resta, who was disappointed to be eliminated in Q2 when team-mate Nico Hülkenberg comfortably progressed to Q3. Jenson Button had to settle for twelfth overall when his McLaren MP4-27 lost all power late in the period, and he later admitted that he was afraid of getting caught up in what he called a "chaotic first lap". Bruno Senna was the last driver eliminated in Q2, qualifying in eleventh place in his best qualifying performance since his Q3 appearance in the Hungarian Grand Prix.

==== Q3 ====
Sebastian Vettel took pole position with the fastest lap of the weekend to date, setting a time of 1:35.657 on his final flying lap. In spite of this, Lewis Hamilton was closer to Vettel than he had been all weekend, missing pole position by just one tenth of a second. Mark Webber qualified third, ahead of Romain Grosjean, who was later demoted to ninth when he received a five-place grid penalty for an unscheduled gearbox change. Kimi Räikkönen qualified fifth, expressing surprise at such a strong qualifying performance when his team had been struggling with the lack of grip throughout free practice. Michael Schumacher, who has won the United States Grand Prix on five occasions, qualified sixth in his penultimate race before his second retirement from the sport, ahead of former team-mate Felipe Massa. Nico Hülkenberg finished the session in eighth, while Fernando Alonso struggled throughout qualifying to finish ninth overall. Ferrari were later forced to defend their qualifying tactics after sending Alonso out to complete his final timed run on a set of "scrubbed" – used – tyres. Pastor Maldonado completed the top ten.

=== Post-qualifying ===
Both Michael Schumacher and Mark Webber were summoned to the stewards' office after qualifying. Schumacher had been cited for blocking Alonso during Q2 when the Mercedes driver impeded him at Turn 15. Schumacher escaped without punishment, as he had been on a flying lap of his own at the time, and blocking Alonso had not prevented him from advancing to Q3.

Webber, on the other hand, was called to answer charges of missing the mandatory weight check at the end of qualifying. The stewards accepted that Red Bull Racing had made an error and saw that the car was immediately sent to scrutineering once it was realised. Webber escaped with a reprimand, thereby allowing him to keep his grid position for the race.

=== Race ===
At the start, Vettel led from pole position and Webber passed Hamilton before entering the first corner. Alonso made a good start to gain 3 places. Vettel opened up a lead over Webber before Hamilton passed the Australian in the DRS zone on the long straight from T11 to T12 on Lap 4. Webber would later retire on Lap 17 when KERS shut down and eventually the alternator failed on the Red Bull car. Vettel would pit on Lap 22 but retained the lead over Räikkönen, Hamilton, Massa, and Alonso. Hamilton was able to catch and pass Vettel on Lap 42 in the DRS zone and kept the lead into turn 12. McLaren's Lewis Hamilton would go on to win the race, his last win for McLaren, followed by Red Bull's Sebastian Vettel and Ferrari's Fernando Alonso. Bruno Senna scored his final Formula One point.

=== Post-race ===
Vettel was able to increase the gap to Alonso to thirteen points. As a result, Vettel only needed a fourth place at best in the final race to clinch his third consecutive drivers' title. Vettel's second place gave Red Bull Racing enough points to secure their third consecutive World Constructors' Championship.

== Classification ==
=== Qualifying ===
Pos.	No.	Driver	Constructor	Part 1	Part 2	Part 3	Grid
1	1	(Germany) Sebastian Vettel	Red Bull-Renault	1:36.558	1:35.796	1:35.657	1
2	4	(United Kingdom) Lewis Hamilton	McLaren-Mercedes	1:37.058	1:36.795	1:35.766	2
3	2	(Australia) Mark Webber	Red Bull-Renault	1:37.215	1:36.298	1:36.174	3
4	10	(France) Romain Grosjean	Lotus-Renault	1:37.486	1:36.906	1:36.587	8^{1}
5	9	(Finland) Kimi Räikkönen	Lotus-Renault	1:38.051	1:37.404	1:36.708	4
6	7	(Germany) Michael Schumacher	Mercedes	1:37.927	1:37.102	1:36.794	5
7	6	(Brazil) Felipe Massa	Ferrari	1:37.667	1:36.549	1:36.937	11^{2}
8	12	(Germany) Nico Hülkenberg	Force India-Mercedes	1:37.756	1:37.066	1:37.141	6
9	5	(Spain) Fernando Alonso	Ferrari	1:37.968	1:37.123	1:37.300	7
10	18	(Venezuela) Pastor Maldonado	Williams-Renault	1:37.537	1:37.011	1:37.842	9
11	19	(Brazil) Bruno Senna	Williams-Renault	1:37.520	1:37.604		10
12	3	(United Kingdom) Jenson Button	McLaren-Mercedes	1:37.565	1:37.616		12
13	11	(United Kingdom) Paul di Resta	Force India-Mercedes	1:38.104	1:37.665		13
14	17	(France) Jean-Éric Vergne	Toro Rosso-Ferrari	1:38.434	1:37.879		14
15	15	(Mexico) Sergio Pérez	Sauber-Ferrari	1:38.500	1:38.206		15
16	14	(Japan) Kamui Kobayashi	Sauber-Ferrari	1:38.418	1:38.437		16
17	8	(Germany) Nico Rosberg	Mercedes	1:38.862	1:38.501		17
18	16	(Australia) Daniel Ricciardo	Toro Rosso-Ferrari	1:39.114			18
19	24	(Germany) Timo Glock	Marussia-Cosworth	1:40.056			19
20	25	(France) Charles Pic	Marussia-Cosworth	1:40.664			20
21	21	(Russia) Vitaly Petrov	Caterham-Renault	1:40.809			21
22	20	(Finland) Heikki Kovalainen	Caterham-Renault	1:41.166			22
23	22	(Spain) Pedro de la Rosa	HRT-Cosworth	1:42.011			23
24	23	(India) Narain Karthikeyan	HRT-Cosworth	1:42.740			24
107% time: 1:43.317

Notes

- ^1 — Romain Grosjean received a five-place grid penalty for a gearbox change.
- ^2 — Felipe Massa received a five-place grid penalty for a gearbox change when Ferrari broke the FIA seal on his gearbox in order to maximise Fernando Alonso's grid position.

=== Race ===
Pos.	No.	Driver	Constructor	Laps	Time/Retired	Grid	Points
1	4	(United Kingdom) Lewis Hamilton	McLaren-Mercedes	56	1:35:55.269	2	25
2	1	(Germany) Sebastian Vettel	Red Bull-Renault	56	+0.675	1	18
3	5	(Spain) Fernando Alonso	Ferrari	56	+39.229	7	15
4	6	(Brazil) Felipe Massa	Ferrari	56	+46.013	11	12
5	3	(United Kingdom) Jenson Button	McLaren-Mercedes	56	+56.432	12	10
6	9	(Finland) Kimi Räikkönen	Lotus-Renault	56	+1:04.425	4	8
7	10	(France) Romain Grosjean	Lotus-Renault	56	+1:10.313	8	6
8	12	(Germany) Nico Hülkenberg	Force India-Mercedes	56	+1:13.792	6	4
9	18	(Venezuela) Pastor Maldonado	Williams-Renault	56	+1:14.525	9	2
10	19	(Brazil) Bruno Senna	Williams-Renault	56	+1:15.133	10	1
11	15	(Mexico) Sergio Pérez	Sauber-Ferrari	56	+1:24.341	15	
12	16	(Australia) Daniel Ricciardo	Toro Rosso-Ferrari	56	+1:24.871	18	
13	8	(Germany) Nico Rosberg	Mercedes	56	+1:25.510	17	
14	14	(Japan) Kamui Kobayashi	Sauber-Ferrari	55	+1 Lap	16	
15	11	(United Kingdom) Paul di Resta	Force India-Mercedes	55	+1 Lap	13	
16	7	(Germany) Michael Schumacher	Mercedes	55	+1 Lap	5	
17	21	(Russia) Vitaly Petrov	Caterham-Renault	55	+1 Lap	21	
18	20	(Finland) Heikki Kovalainen	Caterham-Renault	55	+1 Lap	22	
19	24	(Germany) Timo Glock	Marussia-Cosworth	55	+1 Lap	19	
20	25	(France) Charles Pic	Marussia-Cosworth	54	+2 Laps	20	
21	22	(Spain) Pedro de la Rosa	HRT-Cosworth	54	+2 Laps	23	
22	23	(India) Narain Karthikeyan	HRT-Cosworth	54	+2 Laps	24	
Ret	2	(Australia) Mark Webber	Red Bull-Renault	16	Alternator	3	
Ret	17	(France) Jean-Éric Vergne	Toro Rosso-Ferrari	14	Suspension	14	

== Championship standings after the race ==
Drivers' Championship standings

	Pos.	Driver	Points
	1	(Germany) **Sebastian Vettel***	273
	2	(Spain) **Fernando Alonso***	260
	3	(Finland) Kimi Räikkönen	206
1	4	(United Kingdom) Lewis Hamilton	190
1	5	(Australia) Mark Webber	167

Constructors' Championship standings

Pos.	Constructor	Points
1	(Austria) **Red Bull-Renault***	440
2	(Italy) Ferrari	367
3	(United Kingdom) McLaren-Mercedes	353
4	(United Kingdom) Lotus-Renault	302
5	(Germany) Mercedes	136

Notes:
- Only the top five positions are included for both sets of standings.
- Teams and drivers in bold and with an asterisk had a mathematical possibility of winning the title.

Previous race: 2012 Abu Dhabi Grand Prix	FIA Formula One World Championship; 2012 season	Next race: 2012 Brazilian Grand Prix
Previous race: 2007 United States Grand Prix	United States Grand Prix	Next race: 2013 United States Grand Prix
