= 2013 United States Grand Prix =

Race 18 of 19 in the 2013 Formula One World Championship
← Previous race	Next race →
- Layout of the Circuit of the Americas

Race details
- Date: November 17, 2013
- Official name: 2013 Formula 1 United States Grand Prix
- Location: Circuit of the Americas; Travis County, Austin, Texas
- Course: Permanent racing facility
- Course length: 5.513 km (3.426 miles)
- Distance: 56 laps, 308.405 km (191.634 miles)
- Weather: Partly cloudy, warm Temperatures reaching up to 89.1 °F (31.7 °C); wind speeds approaching speeds of 11.1 miles per hour (17.9 km/h)
- Attendance: 250,324 (Weekend) 113,162 (Race Day)

Pole position
Driver	(Germany) Sebastian Vettel	Red Bull-Renault
- Time: 1:36.338

Fastest lap
Driver	(Germany) Sebastian Vettel	Red Bull-Renault
- Time: 1:39.856 on lap 54

Podium
First	(Germany) Sebastian Vettel	Red Bull-Renault
Second	(France) Romain Grosjean	Lotus-Renault
Third	(Australia) Mark Webber	Red Bull-Renault

The 2013 United States Grand Prix is a Formula One motor race that was held at the Circuit of the Americas on November 17, 2013. The race was the eighteenth and penultimate round of the 2013 season, and marks the second running of the United States Grand Prix in Austin. The race was won by Red Bull-Renault's Sebastian Vettel, for his eighth consecutive win, a new F1 record for consecutive wins within a single season.

This would be Red Bull's last win at the Circuit of the Americas until the 2021 United States Grand Prix.

== Report ==
=== Background ===
==== Driver changes ====
Kimi Räikkönen announced a week before the Grand Prix that he would be missing the final two races of 2013, in order to have back surgery. He had wanted to delay the operation until the off-season, but suffered increasing discomfort over the previous races. Räikkönen's decision meant that the previous race was his last race competing for Lotus, having agreed to join Ferrari for the 2014 season. His place was taken by Heikki Kovalainen, who signed a two-race deal with the team.

==== Tyres ====
Like the previous United States Grand Prix, tyre supplier Pirelli will bring its orange-banded hard compound tyre as the harder "prime" tyre and the white-banded medium compound tyre as the softer "option" tyre.

=== Free practice ===
Jenson Button was given a three-place grid penalty for the race, after overtaking under red flags during the opening practice session. Charles Pic was given a five-place penalty for the race after Caterham changed the gearbox in his car.

=== Qualifying ===
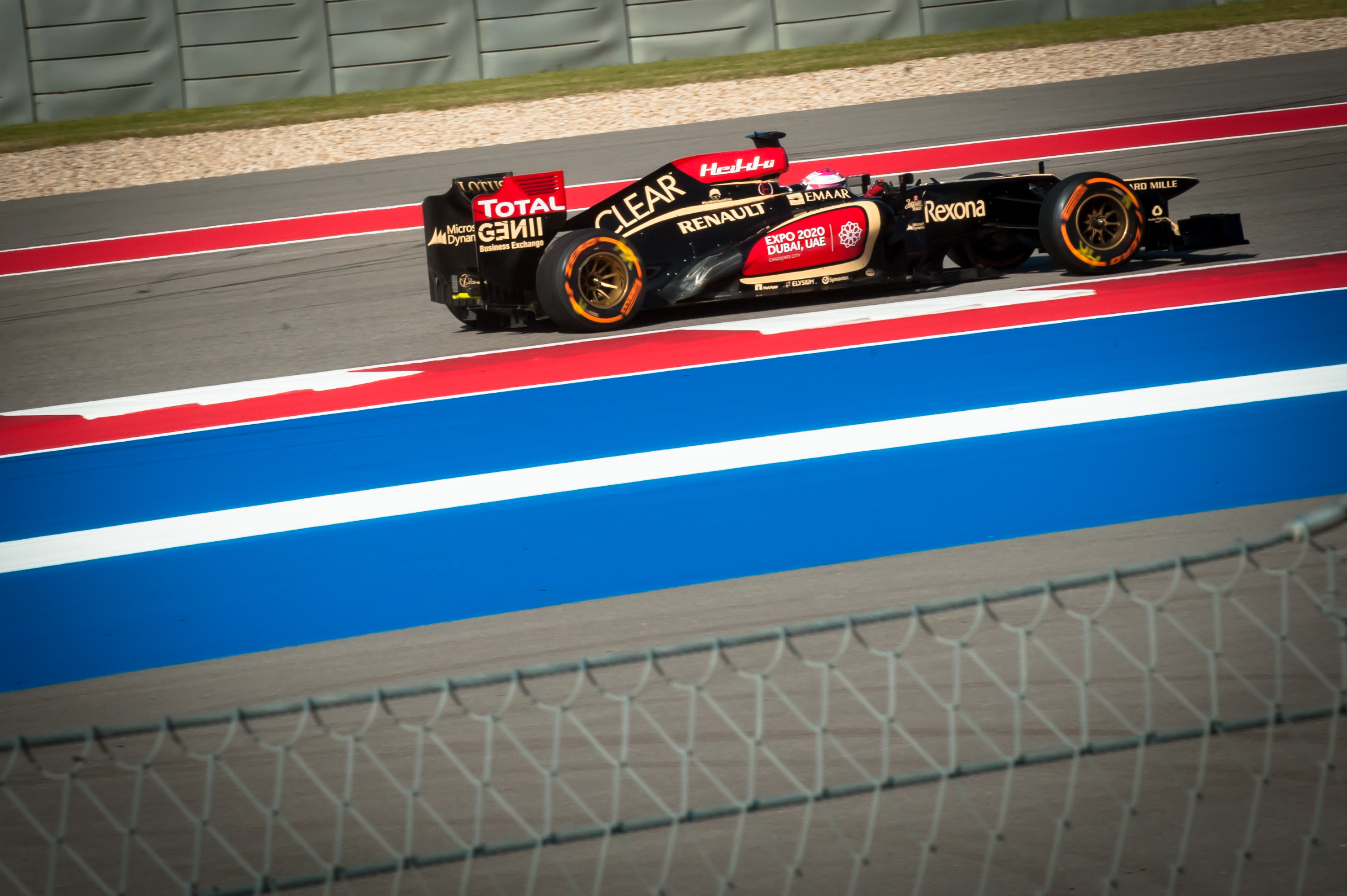
Kovalainen, who replaced Räikkönen at Lotus, took eighth in qualifying

Esteban Gutiérrez and Max Chilton were given penalties for impeding other drivers in the first qualifying session. Gutiérrez, who blocked Pastor Maldonado was handed a ten-place grid penalty; Chilton had served a drive-through penalty within the first five laps of the race after he impeded both Maldonado and Adrian Sutil.

=== Race ===
At the start, Sebastian Vettel led away but soon after the safety car was deployed after Pastor Maldonado and Adrian Sutil collided, sending the latter into the barriers. At the restart on lap 5, Vettel quickly built up his lead and was never challenged en route to his 8th consecutive victory, taking the fastest lap with two laps remaining. Behind him Lotus driver Romain Grosjean held off Vettel's teammate, Mark Webber, for 2nd.

=== Post-race ===
Jean-Éric Vergne was given a 20-second penalty for a collision with Esteban Gutiérrez on the final lap of the race. He moved down from 12th to 16th as a result.

== Classification ==
=== Qualifying ===
Pos.	No.	Driver	Constructor	Q1	Q2	Q3	Grid
1	1	(Germany) Sebastian Vettel	Red Bull-Renault	1:38.516	1:37.065	1:36.338	1
2	2	(Australia) Mark Webber	Red Bull-Renault	1:38.161	1:37.312	1:36.441	2
3	8	(France) Romain Grosjean	Lotus-Renault	1:38.676	1:37.523	1:37.155	3
4	11	(Germany) Nico Hülkenberg	Sauber-Ferrari	1:38.339	1:37.828	1:37.296	4
5	10	(United Kingdom) Lewis Hamilton	Mercedes	1:37.959	1:37.854	1:37.345	5
6	3	(Spain) Fernando Alonso	Ferrari	1:38.929	1:37.368	1:37.376	6
7	6	(Mexico) Sergio Pérez	McLaren-Mercedes	1:38.367	1:38.040	1:37.452	7
8	7	(Finland) Heikki Kovalainen	Lotus-Renault	1:38.375	1:38.078	1:37.715	8
9	17	(Finland) Valtteri Bottas	Williams-Renault	1:37.821	1:37.439	1:37.836	9
10	12	(Mexico) Esteban Gutiérrez	Sauber-Ferrari	1:38.082	1:38.031	1:38.034	20^{1}
11	19	(Australia) Daniel Ricciardo	Toro Rosso-Ferrari	1:38.882	1:38.131		10
12	14	(United Kingdom) Paul di Resta	Force India-Mercedes	1:38.894	1:38.139		11
13	5	(United Kingdom) Jenson Button	McLaren-Mercedes	1:38.588	1:38.217		15^{2}
14	9	(Germany) Nico Rosberg	Mercedes	1:38.743	1:38.364		12
15	4	(Brazil) Felipe Massa	Ferrari	1:39.094	1:38.592		13
16	18	(France) Jean-Éric Vergne	Toro Rosso-Ferrari	1:38.880	1:38.696		14
17	15	(Germany) Adrian Sutil	Force India-Mercedes	1:39.250			16
18	16	(Venezuela) Pastor Maldonado	Williams-Renault	1:39.351			17
19	21	(Netherlands) Giedo van der Garde	Caterham-Renault	1:40.491			18
20	22	(France) Jules Bianchi	Marussia-Cosworth	1:40.528			19
21	20	(France) Charles Pic	Caterham-Renault	1:40.596			22^{3}
22	23	(United Kingdom) Max Chilton	Marussia-Cosworth	1:41.401			21
107% time: 1:44.668

Notes:

^1 – Esteban Gutiérrez qualified 10th, but was given a ten-place grid penalty for the race after blocking Pastor Maldonado during qualifying.
^2 – Jenson Button qualified 13th, but was given a three-place grid penalty for the race, after overtaking under red flags during the opening practice session.
^3 – Charles Pic qualified 21st, but was given a five-place penalty for the race after a gearbox change.

=== Race ===
Pos.	No.	Driver	Constructor	Laps	Time/Retired	Grid	Points
1	1	(Germany) Sebastian Vettel	Red Bull-Renault	56	1:39:17.148	1	25
2	8	(France) Romain Grosjean	Lotus-Renault	56	+ 6.284	3	18
3	2	(Australia) Mark Webber	Red Bull-Renault	56	+ 8.396	2	15
4	10	(United Kingdom) Lewis Hamilton	Mercedes	56	+ 27.358	5	12
5	3	(Spain) Fernando Alonso	Ferrari	56	+ 29.592	6	10
6	11	(Germany) Nico Hülkenberg	Sauber-Ferrari	56	+ 30.400	4	8
7	6	(Mexico) Sergio Pérez	McLaren-Mercedes	56	+ 46.692	7	6
8	17	(Finland) Valtteri Bottas	Williams-Renault	56	+ 54.509	9	4
9	9	(Germany) Nico Rosberg	Mercedes	56	+ 59.141	12	2
10	5	(United Kingdom) Jenson Button	McLaren-Mercedes	56	+ 1:17.278	15	1
11	19	(Australia) Daniel Ricciardo	Toro Rosso-Ferrari	56	+ 1:21.004	10	
12	4	(Brazil) Felipe Massa	Ferrari	56	+ 1:26.914	13	
13	12	(Mexico) Esteban Gutiérrez	Sauber-Ferrari	56	+ 1:31.707	20	
14	7	(Finland) Heikki Kovalainen	Lotus-Renault	56	+ 1:35.063	8	
15	14	(United Kingdom) Paul di Resta	Force India-Mercedes	56	+ 1:36.853	11	
16	18	(France) Jean-Éric Vergne	Toro Rosso-Ferrari	56	+ 1:44.574^{1}	14	
17	16	(Venezuela) Pastor Maldonado	Williams-Renault	55	+ 1 Lap	17	
18	22	(France) Jules Bianchi	Marussia-Cosworth	55	+ 1 Lap	19	
19	21	(Netherlands) Giedo van der Garde	Caterham-Renault	55	+ 1 Lap	18	
20	20	(France) Charles Pic	Caterham-Renault	55	+ 1 Lap	22	
21	23	(United Kingdom) Max Chilton	Marussia-Cosworth	54	+ 2 Laps	21	
Ret	15	(Germany) Adrian Sutil	Force India-Mercedes	0	Collision	16	

Notes:
^1 – Jean-Éric Vergne was penalised 20 seconds post-race for colliding with Esteban Gutiérrez.

== Championship standings after the race ==
Drivers' Championship standings

	Pos.	Driver	Points
	1	(Germany) **Sebastian Vettel**	372
	2	(Spain) Fernando Alonso	227
1	3	(United Kingdom) Lewis Hamilton	187
1	4	(Finland) Kimi Räikkönen	183
	5	(Australia) Mark Webber	181

Constructors' Championship standings

Pos.	Constructor	Points
1	(Austria) **Red Bull-Renault**	553
2	(Germany) Mercedes	348
3	(Italy) Ferrari	333
4	(United Kingdom) Lotus-Renault	315
5	(United Kingdom) McLaren-Mercedes	102

- Note: Only the top five positions are included for both sets of standings.
- Competitors in bold text are 2013 World Champions.

Previous race: 2013 Abu Dhabi Grand Prix	FIA Formula One World Championship; 2013 season	Next race: 2013 Brazilian Grand Prix
Previous race: 2012 United States Grand Prix	United States Grand Prix	Next race: 2014 United States Grand Prix
