= Gerald Martin Smith =

British businessman and convicted fraudster

Gerald Martin Smith (born 21 May 1955) is a British businessman and convicted fraudster.

== Early life ==
Smith was born on 21 May 1955. He qualified as a physician.

== Business career ==
In 1993, while chief executive of the Farr construction group, he was prosecuted for stealing £2 million from its pension fund and sentenced to two years' imprisonment.

In 2002, Smith acquired 30% of Izodia plc through his investment company, Orb. He placed his own directors on the board and moved the main company bank account to Jersey where he stole money from it. In December 2002, the Serious Fraud Office (SFO) raided his home in Jersey and his company offices. By February 2005, criminal charges were being considered. On the day that Smith was to report with his lawyers to the SFO's offices, he was involved in a car crash and had to be cut from his Audi A8 after having run into a tree. Traffic police found two first class tickets to New York in his briefcase. In April 2006 he pleaded guilty to ten counts of theft and false accounting, admitting to misappropriating over £34 million from Izodia, and was sentenced to eight years' imprisonment. He was disqualified from acting as a company director for 15 years and released from prison after four years.

In 2007 a confiscation order of over £40 million was made against him, then the largest ever made in English criminal proceedings. With interest, the SFO put the amount outstanding at £72 million in 2021 and over £81.9 million by October 2025.

=== Litigation following release ===
Shortly after his release, in October 2012 proceedings were brought by Orb and two associates against Andy Ruhan and his advisers, alleging an oral agreement to share profits from assets Orb had sold to Ruhan's companies in 2003. Smith was not a party, but was later described in court as having been the driving force behind the litigation. The claim, reported as being for over £100 million, was funded from 2013 by the litigation funder Harbour Fund II LP. It was dismissed by consent in May 2016 after a settlement signed in Geneva, which Mr Justice Foxton later described as a "bogus settlement" put together to disguise the division of assets Smith regarded as stolen from him.

In 2021 Mr Justice Foxton, ruling on competing claims to Smith's assets, described the underlying dispute between Smith and Ruhan as one of "labyrinthine complexity" and found that neither man had been straightforward in the business dealings that gave rise to it. The court upheld the SFO's claim to the assets. In 2023, summarising that history, Foxton J said he had "chronicled the many findings of dishonesty against Dr Smith, Mr Ruhan, Mr Cooper and McNally" made in the litigation.

In November 2024, in Hotel Portfolio II v Marlborough Developments, Mr Justice Bryan found that Smith and Ruhan, previously bitter opponents, had colluded to form what he called "the unholiest of unholy alliances" to frustrate a £102.26 million judgment obtained against Ruhan by his former company, Hotel Portfolio II. The judge found the two men had woven a "web of deceit" that came undone at trial, in part because they "failed to keep up with the lies they were spinning". He held Smith liable for knowingly assisting Ruhan's breach of the company's judgment rights, set aside a £850 million default judgment Smith's companies had obtained against Ruhan as fraudulently obtained, and struck out the underlying proceedings as "a paradigm example of abusive proceedings".

== Contempt of court and 2024 loan fraud conviction ==
In July 2022 the SFO announced that Smith, described in its release as "a twice-convicted man" behind the £34 million Izodia fraud, had been held in contempt of court for breaching a restraint order by using undisclosed bank accounts to fund a lifestyle that included more than £57,000 spent at bars, restaurants and wine merchants over 15 months. He was sentenced to eight months' imprisonment, suspended for 18 months.

In September 2024 Smith was convicted at Southwark Crown Court of fraudulently obtaining a £50,000 Covid-19 bounce-back loan, of which £22,000 had gone towards a costs order made against him in the confiscation proceedings, and was sentenced to 18 months' imprisonment.

In December 2024 Mr Justice Henshaw found Smith guilty of three further contempts of court: repeatedly exceeding the restraint order's spending limit, and twice breaching undertakings by obstructing the Enforcement Receivers' possession of flats he owned at Hamilton House, Bloomsbury. The SFO said Smith had persuaded an old friend from medical school to transfer ownership of the property to a company he secretly controlled in the British Virgin Islands, then changed the locks and installed occupants to delay the sale. He was sentenced to a further 13 months' imprisonment, to run after his sentence for the loan fraud, taking his total number of prison sentences to five.

Separately, in February 2023 Mr Justice Foxton held that a house in Ascot, which Smith's brother argued belonged beneficially to their late mother's estate, was in fact beneficially Smith's and available to satisfy the confiscation order. The judge observed that Smith had twice been convicted of offences of dishonesty and had been found in later civil judgments to have engaged in serial dishonesty after his release from prison.

== Personal life ==
Smith was married to Gail Cochrane, a medical practitioner in Jersey, until their divorce; the couple have two daughters. She was described in 2017 by Serious Fraud Office lawyer Kennedy Talbot QC as the "front" for Smith's continuing business activities.

In 2016 the Royal Court of Jersey declared Cochrane and Orb en désastre at the request of the litigation funder Harbour, finding she had shown no reasonably arguable defence to its claim under a guarantee she had given. In 2023 Mr Justice Foxton found that shares in companies connected to Smith had been held on his behalf by Cochrane, describing her as "a close business and personal associate" of Smith who had featured in many of the arrangements he had orchestrated.
