= Izodia =

Izodia plc, formerly known as Infobank, was an information technology company listed on the London Stock Exchange and later the Alternative Investment Market that went out of business after it was defrauded of £34 million by Gerald Smith. In 2005, Smith pleaded guilty to 10 counts of theft and one of false accounting in respect of his position at Izodia and was sentenced to eight years' imprisonment.
