= Matthew Carter (businessman) =

British businessman

- Occupation: Businessman
- Employer: British Columbia Rugby Union
- Title: CEO

Matthew Carter is a British businessman and motorsport executive. He is currently the CEO at the British Columbia Rugby Union, and previously served as CEO of the Lotus F1 Team.

== Career ==
Carter began his career in corporate restructuring and turnaround management. From 1999 to 2004 he ran his own business specialising in acquiring, stabilising and reselling companies in financial difficulty, gaining experience in operational management, cost control and value recovery. He later joined Bridgehouse Capital, where he served as a senior investment manager from 2004 to 2013. In this role Carter worked across a broad portfolio of investments, often acting in executive capacities within portfolio companies and focusing on financial performance, restructuring strategies and long-term value creation.

Following Bridgehouse Capital's investment in the Enstone-based Formula One operation, Carter was appointed chief executive officer of the Lotus F1 Team in 2014. At the time, the team faced significant financial pressures despite remaining technically competitive. As CEO, Carter was responsible for the team's commercial and financial management, overseeing cost-control measures, creditor negotiations and efforts to secure the organisation's long-term future. He played a central role in stabilising the business and guiding it through a period of ownership transition. Carter ultimately led the process that resulted in Renault's reacquisition of the Enstone team, completing the sale at the end of 2015 and paving the way for its return as a full works outfit for the 2016 season.

After his time in Formula One, Carter moved into senior roles focused on commercial strategy and sports administration. In 2016, he became Business Development Director at French club LOSC Lille, where he worked on the club's commercial growth and international strategy following investment by Genii Capital. He was later involved in the organisation of the ultimately cancelled Vancouver ePrix. He has since taken on the role of chief executive officer of British Columbia Rugby Union.
