= 2013 Abu Dhabi Grand Prix =

Race 17 of 19 in the 2013 Formula One World Championship
← Previous race	Next race →

Race details
- Date: 3 November 2013
- Official name: 2013 Formula 1 Etihad Airways Abu Dhabi Grand Prix
- Location: Yas Marina Circuit; Yas Island, Abu Dhabi, United Arab Emirates
- Course: Permanent racing facility
- Course length: 5.554 km (3.451 miles)
- Distance: 55 laps, 305.355 km (189.739 miles)
- Weather: Clear

Pole position
Driver	(Australia) Mark Webber	Red Bull-Renault
- Time: 1:39.957

Fastest lap
Driver	(Spain) Fernando Alonso	Ferrari
- Time: 1:43.434 on lap 55

Podium
First	(Germany) Sebastian Vettel	Red Bull-Renault
Second	(Australia) Mark Webber	Red Bull-Renault
Third	(Germany) Nico Rosberg	Mercedes

The 2013 Abu Dhabi Grand Prix (formally known as the 2013 Formula 1 Etihad Airways Abu Dhabi Grand Prix) was a Formula One motor race that was held at the Yas Marina Circuit on 3 November 2013. The race was the seventeenth round of the 2013 season, and marked the 5th running of the Abu Dhabi Grand Prix.

The race, contested over 55 laps, was won by Sebastian Vettel, driving a Red Bull. Mark Webber finished second, and by Nico Rosberg driving a Mercedes was third. Vettel won the race 30.8s ahead of his Red Bull teammate Mark Webber. Vettel's victory equalled Alberto Ascari and Michael Schumacher's record for most consecutive wins (7). This was Red Bull's 100th podium. Adrian Sutil scored his last World Championship points at this race, as well as Paul di Resta.

== Report ==
=== Background ===
==== Partial solar eclipse ====
During the race it was possible to observe a partial solar eclipse from 17:22 local time to 17:39 local time when the Sun set, and this was shown briefly during the race live broadcast.

==== Tyres ====
Like the 2012 Abu Dhabi Grand Prix, tyre supplier Pirelli brought its white-banded medium compound tyre as the harder "prime" tyre and the yellow-banded soft compound tyre as the softer "option" tyre.

=== Free practice ===
Romain Grosjean and Lewis Hamilton were top in the first practice session.

Red Bull drivers were fastest in the second practice session with Vettel leading Webber by a tenth of a second.

During third practice Mercedes and Red Bull were close at the top and the session ended with Vettel two-tenths of a second ahead of Webber who in turn was less than a hundredth of a second faster than Hamilton's Mercedes.

=== Qualifying ===
Webber qualified in pole position ahead of his Red Bull teammate Vettel who qualified in second. The Mercedes drivers of Hamilton and Rosberg qualified on the second row of the grid. Fernando Alonso was the highest placed driver in the World Championship standings who failed to qualify for the final round of qualifying.

Jules Bianchi was penalised before the start of qualifying five places on the grid for an unscheduled gearbox change.

==== Post-qualifying ====
Kimi Räikkönen was excluded from qualifying and was relegated to twenty-second place on the grid having originally qualified fifth place on the grid after his car failed a floor deflection test.

=== Race ===
The race began with Vettel in second on the grid overtaking Webber into the first corner and then leading until the chequered flag. Rosberg moved up to second position, while Kimi Räikkönen, starting from the back of the grid, broke his front-right suspension after contact with Giedo van der Garde, causing Räikkönen to retire from the race. German Nico Hülkenberg, during his first pit-stop was deemed to have been unsafely released and was given a drive through penalty. Grosjean, advanced from sixth on the grid to fourth after the start. During the first half of the race, Felipe Massa led his team-mate Alonso, but was overtaken by Alonso in the latter stages of the race. After Alonso's second pit-stop, he came out of the pitlane and moved around backmarker Jean-Éric Vergne, going off the racetrack with all four wheels in a move that consequently caused Massa to run wide into turn five. Vettel won the race by 30.8s over Webber.

=== Post race ===
During the cool down lap Vettel and Webber performed doughnuts. As Vettel had done one after the previous race in India, this time he incurred no penalty from the stewards.

Alonso was sent for precautionary medical checks after a kerb impact measured at 25g.

== Classification ==
=== Qualifying ===
Pos.	No.	Driver	Constructor	Q1	Q2	Q3	Grid
1	2	(Australia) Mark Webber	Red Bull-Renault	1:41.568	1:40.575	1:39.957	1
2	1	(Germany) Sebastian Vettel	Red Bull-Renault	1:41.683	1:40.781	1:40.075	2
3	9	(Germany) Nico Rosberg	Mercedes	1:41.420	1:40.473	1:40.419	3
4	10	(United Kingdom) Lewis Hamilton	Mercedes	1:40.693	1:40.477	1:40.501	4
5	11	(Germany) Nico Hülkenberg	Sauber-Ferrari	1:41.631	1:40.931	1:40.576	5
6	8	(France) Romain Grosjean	Lotus-Renault	1:41.447	1:40.948	1:40.997	6
7	4	(Brazil) Felipe Massa	Ferrari	1:41.254	1:40.989	1:41.015	7
8	6	(Mexico) Sergio Pérez	McLaren-Mercedes	1:41.687	1:40.812	1:41.068	8
9	19	(Australia) Daniel Ricciardo	Toro Rosso-Ferrari	1:41.884	1:40.852	1:41.111	9
10	3	(Spain) Fernando Alonso	Ferrari	1:41.397	1:41.093		10
11	14	(United Kingdom) Paul di Resta	Force India-Mercedes	1:41.676	1:41.133		11
12	5	(United Kingdom) Jenson Button	McLaren-Mercedes	1:41.817	1:41.200		12
13	18	(France) Jean-Éric Vergne	Toro Rosso-Ferrari	1:41.692	1:41.279		13
14	16	(Venezuela) Pastor Maldonado	Williams-Renault	1:41.365	1:41.395		14
15	17	(Finland) Valtteri Bottas	Williams-Renault	1:41.862	1:41.447		15
16	12	(Mexico) Esteban Gutiérrez	Sauber-Ferrari	1:41.999			16
17	15	(Germany) Adrian Sutil	Force India-Mercedes	1:42.051			17
18	21	(Netherlands) Giedo van der Garde	Caterham-Renault	1:43.252			18
19	22	(France) Jules Bianchi	Marussia-Cosworth	1:43.398			21^{2}
20	20	(France) Charles Pic	Caterham-Renault	1:43.528			19
21	23	(United Kingdom) Max Chilton	Marussia-Cosworth	1:44.198			20
DSQ	7	(Finland) Kimi Räikkönen	Lotus-Renault	1:41.276	1:40.971	1:40.542	22^{1}
107% time: 1:47.741

Notes:
^1 - Kimi Räikkönen qualified fifth, but was disqualified from qualifying when his car failed a floor deflection test.
^2 - Jules Bianchi qualified twentieth, but penalised five grid places for an unscheduled gearbox change and started from twenty-first after Räikkönen was disqualified from qualifying.

=== Race ===
Pos.	No.	Driver	Constructor	Laps	Time/Retired	Grid	Points
1	1	(Germany) Sebastian Vettel	Red Bull-Renault	55	1:38:06.106	2	25
2	2	(Australia) Mark Webber	Red Bull-Renault	55	+30.829	1	18
3	9	(Germany) Nico Rosberg	Mercedes	55	+33.650	3	15
4	8	(France) Romain Grosjean	Lotus-Renault	55	+34.802	6	12
5	3	(Spain) Fernando Alonso	Ferrari	55	+1:07.181	10	10
6	14	(United Kingdom) Paul di Resta	Force India-Mercedes	55	+1:18.174	11	8
7	10	(United Kingdom) Lewis Hamilton	Mercedes	55	+1:19.267	4	6
8	4	(Brazil) Felipe Massa	Ferrari	55	+1:22.886	7	4
9	6	(Mexico) Sergio Pérez	McLaren-Mercedes	55	+1:31.198	8	2
10	15	(Germany) Adrian Sutil	Force India-Mercedes	55	+1:33.257	17	1
11	16	(Venezuela) Pastor Maldonado	Williams-Renault	55	+1:35.989	14	
12	5	(United Kingdom) Jenson Button	McLaren-Mercedes	55	+1:43.767	12	
13	12	(Mexico) Esteban Gutiérrez	Sauber-Ferrari	55	+1:44.295	16	
14	11	(Germany) Nico Hülkenberg	Sauber-Ferrari	54	+1 Lap	5	
15	17	(Finland) Valtteri Bottas	Williams-Renault	54	+1 Lap	15	
16	19	(Australia) Daniel Ricciardo	Toro Rosso-Ferrari	54	+1 Lap	9	
17	18	(France) Jean-Éric Vergne	Toro Rosso-Ferrari	54	+1 Lap	13	
18	21	(Netherlands) Giedo van der Garde	Caterham-Renault	54	+1 Lap	18	
19	20	(France) Charles Pic	Caterham-Renault	54	+1 Lap	19	
20	22	(France) Jules Bianchi	Marussia-Cosworth	53	+2 Laps	21	
21	23	(United Kingdom) Max Chilton	Marussia-Cosworth	53	+2 Laps	20	
Ret	7	(Finland) Kimi Räikkönen	Lotus-Renault	0	Collision/Suspension	22	

== Championship standings after the race ==
Drivers' Championship standings

Pos.	Driver	Points
1	(Germany) **Sebastian Vettel**	347
2	(Spain) Fernando Alonso	217
3	(Finland) Kimi Räikkönen	183
4	(United Kingdom) Lewis Hamilton	175
5	(Australia) Mark Webber	166

Constructors' Championship standings

Pos.	Constructor	Points
1	(Austria) **Red Bull-Renault**	513
2	(Germany) Mercedes	334
3	(Italy) Ferrari	323
4	(United Kingdom) Lotus-Renault	297
5	(United Kingdom) McLaren-Mercedes	95

- Note: Only the top five positions are included for both sets of standings.
- The 2013 champions are marked in bold.

== See also ==
- 2013 Yas Marina GP2 Series round
- 2013 Yas Marina GP3 Series round

Previous race: 2013 Indian Grand Prix	FIA Formula One World Championship; 2013 season	Next race: 2013 United States Grand Prix
Previous race: 2012 Abu Dhabi Grand Prix	Abu Dhabi Grand Prix	Next race: 2014 Abu Dhabi Grand Prix
