= 2013 Indian Grand Prix =

Race 16 of 19 in the 2013 Formula One World Championship
← Previous race	Next race →
- Buddh International Circuit

Race details
- Date: 27 October 2013
- Official name: 2013 Formula 1 Airtel Indian Grand Prix
- Location: Buddh International Circuit; Greater Noida, Uttar Pradesh, India
- Course: Permanent racing facility
- Course length: 5.125 km (3.185 miles)
- Distance: 60 laps, 307.249 km (190.916 miles)
- Weather: Sunny, haze
- Attendance: 60,000

Pole position
Driver	(Germany) Sebastian Vettel	Red Bull-Renault
- Time: 1:24.119

Fastest lap
Driver	(Finland) Kimi Räikkönen	Lotus-Renault
- Time: 1:27.679 on lap 60

Podium
First	(Germany) Sebastian Vettel	Red Bull-Renault
Second	(Germany) Nico Rosberg	Mercedes
Third	(France) Romain Grosjean	Lotus-Renault

The 2013 Indian Grand Prix (formally the 2013 Formula 1 Airtel Indian Grand Prix) was a Formula One motor race held on 27 October 2013 at the Buddh International Circuit, Greater Noida, Uttar Pradesh, India. It was the sixteenth round of the 2013 Formula One season, and the third (and, to date, last) Indian Grand Prix. The race, contested over 60 laps, was won by Sebastian Vettel, driving a Red Bull, after starting from pole position. Nico Rosberg finished second in a Mercedes, with Romain Grosjean behind in third driving for the Lotus team. By winning the race, Sebastian Vettel secured his fourth consecutive and last title, as Fernando Alonso could not catch up to Vettel in the championship with only three races remaining. Red Bull also clinched their fourth consecutive Constructors' Championship.

This would be the last Formula One race at the Buddh International Circuit and the last Indian Grand Prix, as of the 2026 season.

== Report ==
=== Background ===
The Grand Prix was contested by eleven teams, each of two drivers. The teams, also known as "constructors", were Red Bull-Renault, Ferrari, McLaren-Mercedes, Lotus-Renault, Mercedes, Sauber-Ferrari, Force India-Mercedes, Williams-Renault, Toro Rosso-Ferrari, Caterham-Renault and Marussia-Cosworth.

Before the race, Red Bull driver Sebastian Vettel led the Drivers' Championship with 297 points; Ferrari driver Fernando Alonso was second on 207 points. A maximum of 100 points were available in the remaining four races, which meant Alonso could still win the title. Vettel only needed a fifth place or higher to become Drivers' Champion, even if Alonso won. Behind Vettel and Alonso in the Drivers' Championship, Kimi Räikkönen was third with 177 points in a Lotus, with Lewis Hamilton and Mark Webber on 161 and 148 points respectively. In the Constructors' Championship, Red Bull were leading on 445 points and Ferrari were second on 297 points, with Mercedes third on 287 points.

In the week leading up to the race, the organisers of the race, Jaypee Sports International attended a court hearing on a dispute over unpaid entertainment taxes from the previous running of the Grand Prix. A court official confirmed, the case would be heard the week after the race, thereby ending speculation that the Grand Prix would be cancelled.

On 21 October, four days before the event's first free practice sessions took place, Toro Rosso confirmed the team was signing GP3 Series driver Daniil Kvyat for the 2014 season, partnering Jean-Éric Vergne.

The drag reduction system (DRS) had two activation zones for the race; one was on the straight between turns 3 and 4, and the second was on the start/finish straight from the final to first corners. The sport's sole tyre supplier Pirelli, provided two specifications of slick compound tyres for the race, designated Medium (also referred to as the "prime" tyre) and Soft (also referred to as the "option" tyre). The Medium compound was distinguished by a white-band with the Soft compound being distinguished by a yellow-band. As was the case for all the 2013 Grands Prix, the rules stipulated that all cars should use both types of tyre during the course of the race, and each driver was limited to eleven sets of dry tyres for the weekend.

=== Practice and qualifying ===
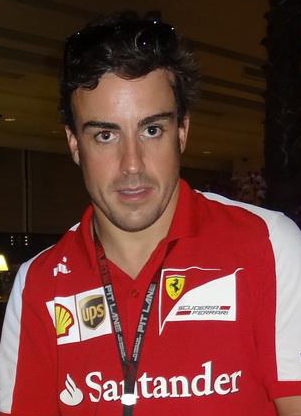
Fernando Alonso completed minimal running during Friday's first practice session due to a gearbox problem on his Ferrari car

Three practice sessions were held before the Sunday race—two on Friday from 11:00 to 12:00 and 14:00 to 15:30 local time, and a third on Saturday morning between 11:00 to 12:00. The first practice session took place in dry conditions with an ambient temperature of 30 °C (86 °F). and a track temperature of 32 °C (90 °F). Vettel set the session's fastest time with a lap of 1 minute and 26.683, almost two-tenths of a second faster than teammate Webber. The Mercedes of Nico Rosberg set the third fastest time ahead of Renault driver Romain Grosjean who was fourth fastest. Hamilton set the fifth fastest time in his Mercedes. The two McLaren drivers were sixth and seventh, Jenson Button ahead of Sergio Pérez. Felipe Massa and Nico Hülkenberg set the eighth and ninth fastest lap times respectively for Ferrari and Sauber. Valtteri Bottas in the Williams completed the top ten. Alonso's Ferrari car was afflicted by a gearbox problem; this restricted him to completing only six timed laps, and he was 12th overall.

The second practice session was held in similar weather to the first; the only difference was a slightly higher peak track temperature of 40 °C (104 °F). During this session, Vettel set the fastest lap of the day, a 1:25.722; Webber finished with the second-fastest time. Grosjean ended up with the third fastest time. The Mercedes drivers were again quick—Hamilton in fourth and Rosberg sixth. They were split by Alonso; with teammate Massa in seventh. Räikkonen set the eighth fastest time. The McLaren drivers ran slower— Button in ninth and Pérez tenth. Williams driver Pastor Maldonado suffered from a loose wheel nut which deflated his right-front tyre, as a result of an earlier pitstop. Williams were fined €60,000.

Saturday's weather was again dry for third and final practice session, with an ambient temperature of 28 °C (82 °F) and a track temperature of 35 °C (95 °F). The start of session was delayed by 20 minutes as the medical helicopter was unable to take off, due to poor visibility caused by smog. The Red Bull drivers were again quickest—Vettel setting the fastest time, a 1:25.332, over half a second faster than Webber. Alonso was able to improve his pace and set the third-fastest time. Hamilton and Rosberg set the eighth and tenth fastest times respectively; they were separated by Button.

"The car felt good all weekend and it just got better as the track improved. The car was amazing; it's a great circuit, I really like the flow of it, especially around the middle sector with the high speed corners. If the car behaves the way you want it to through that section then you're always then going to enjoy it, as we did today. It's a great result for the team; Mark is on a different strategy, so we'll see what the race brings tomorrow. We have been getting a lot of questions about the championship this weekend, but we'll keep doing what we've done in the past, just focusing on every single step – we won't change that for tomorrow, or the next couple of races. We've worked hard to get here and tomorrow will be a long race. With the strategy, I think it's always tricky do the right thing, but we have a good package so we should be in good shape."

— Sebastian Vettel, commenting on taking pole position.

Saturday afternoon's qualifying session was divided into three parts. The first part ran for 20 minutes and eliminated the cars from qualifying that finished the session 17th or lower. During this session, the 107% rule was in effect, which necessitated each driver set a time within 107% of the quickest lap to qualify for the race. The second part of qualifying lasted 15 minutes and eliminated cars that finished in positions 11 to 16. The final part of qualifying determined the positions from first to tenth, and decided pole position. The session was held in dry weather; the ambient temperature was 30 °C (86 °F) with a track temperature of 39 °C (102 °F). Vettel set the fastest time in the second and final parts of the session, which clinched him pole position with a lap of 1:24.119. Vettel was joined on the front row by Rosberg, who was nearly eight-tenths of a second slower.

Ricciardo was the fastest driver not to advance into the final session, qualifying 11th; his best time of 1:25.519 was nearly a second slower than Vettel's pace in the second session. Grosjean (Renault), Jules Bianchi (Marussia), Caterham drivers Giedo van der Garde and Charles Pic and Max Chilton (Marussia) failed to advance beyond the first part of qualifying, and thus completed the final rows of the grid. In the first part of qualifying (the only section in which all drivers took part), the entire field was covered by just over two seconds.

=== Race ===
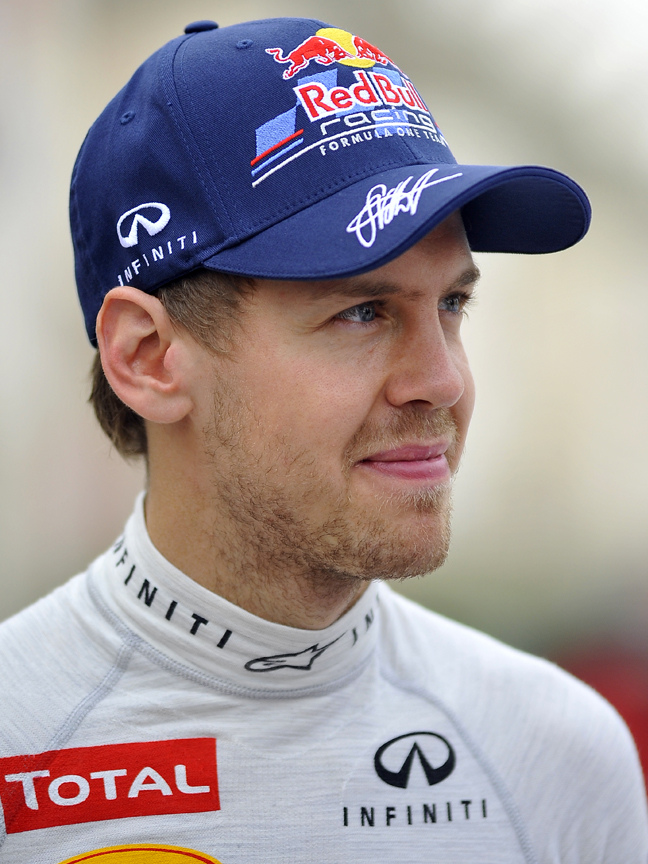
Sebastian Vettel, who took pole and was crowned 2013 Formula One Drivers' Champion as a result of his win (pictured in 2012)

The race took place in the afternoon from 15:00 local time, in dry and sunny weather, with an ambient temperature of 30 °C (86 °F) and a track temperature of 35 °C (95 °F). Vettel, from pole position on the grid, held onto the lead into the first corner. Massa, from fifth, made a good start, moving from 5th to 2nd place by the end of the first lap. Maldonado made the best start in the field, moving from 17th to 13th. Going into the second corner, Alonso touched Webber, resulting in damage to his Ferrari's front wing. At the end of the first lap, Vettel led from Massa, Rosberg, Hamilton, Hülkenberg and Räikkönen.

Vettel began to immediately pull clear of Massa. di Resta and Vergne became the first two drivers to pit by coming in on lap 2. Vettel pitted for a new set of medium compound tyres at the end of lap 2, allowing Massa to take the lead.

On lap 40, Webber suffered an alternator failure and became the third retirement of the race.

Vettel won his tenth race of the season in a time of 1:31:12.187, at an average speed of 125.598 miles per hour (202.130 km/h). Vettel was crowned the 2013 Drivers' Championship as Alonso could not catch his points total with three races remaining. He became the fourth driver after Michael Schumacher, Juan Manuel Fangio and Alain Prost to have won four or more Drivers' Championships. Rosberg finished second in his Mercedes car, 29 seconds behind Vettel, with Grosjean third. Massa was fourth in his Ferrari with Pérez fifth for McLaren. Hamilton took sixth place in the other Mercedes and Räikkönen took seventh in the other Lotus car. The Force India cars of di Resta and Sutil were eighth and ninth respectively, with Ricciardo taking the final point in tenth place for Toro Rosso. Alonso finished eleventh with Maldonado trailing behind in twelfth. Vergne, Button, Gutiérrez and Bottas filled the next places, one lap behind the leader, while Chilton and Bianchi were two laps down in seventeenth and eighteenth. Hülkenberg was the final classified driver in nineteenth.

=== Post-race ===
The top three finishers appeared on the podium to collect their trophies, and in the subsequent press conference. Sebastian Vettel was given a reprimand for failing to drive straight to parc fermé after the race, while Red Bull Racing were given a €25,000 fine for failing to adequately instruct him to do so.

== Classification ==
=== Qualifying ===
Pos.	No.	Driver	Constructor	Q1	Q2	Q3	Grid
1	1	(Germany) Sebastian Vettel	Red Bull-Renault	1:25.943	1:24.568	1:24.119	1
2	9	(Germany) Nico Rosberg	Mercedes	1:25.833	1:25.304	1:24.871	2
3	10	(United Kingdom) Lewis Hamilton	Mercedes	1:25.802	1:25.259	1:24.941	3
4	2	(Australia) Mark Webber	Red Bull-Renault	1:25.665	1:25.097	1:25.047	4
5	4	(Brazil) Felipe Massa	Ferrari	1:25.793	1:25.389	1:25.201	5
6	7	(Finland) Kimi Räikkönen	Lotus-Renault	1:25.819	1:25.191	1:25.248	6
7	11	(Germany) Nico Hülkenberg	Sauber-Ferrari	1:25.883	1:25.339	1:25.334	7
8	3	(Spain) Fernando Alonso	Ferrari	1:25.934	1:24.885	1:25.826	8
9	6	(Mexico) Sergio Pérez	McLaren-Mercedes	1:26.107	1:25.365	1:26.153	9
10	5	(United Kingdom) Jenson Button	McLaren-Mercedes	1:25.574	1:25.458	1:26.487	10
11	19	(Australia) Daniel Ricciardo	Toro Rosso-Ferrari	1:25.673	1:25.519		11
12	14	(United Kingdom) Paul di Resta	Force India-Mercedes	1:25.908	1:25.711		12
13	15	(Germany) Adrian Sutil	Force India-Mercedes	1:26.164	1:25.740		13
14	18	(France) Jean-Éric Vergne	Toro Rosso-Ferrari	1:26.155	1:25.798		14
15	17	(Finland) Valtteri Bottas	Williams-Renault	1:26.178	1:26.134		15
16	12	(Mexico) Esteban Gutiérrez	Sauber-Ferrari	1:26.057	1:26.336		16
17	8	(France) Romain Grosjean	Lotus-Renault	1:26.577			17
18	16	(Venezuela) Pastor Maldonado	Williams-Renault	1:26.842			18
19	22	(France) Jules Bianchi	Marussia-Cosworth	1:26.970			19
20	21	(Netherlands) Giedo van der Garde	Caterham-Renault	1:27.105			20
21	20	(France) Charles Pic	Caterham-Renault	1:27.487			21
22	23	(United Kingdom) Max Chilton	Marussia-Cosworth	1:28.138			22
107% time:1:31.564

=== Race ===
Pos.	No.	Driver	Constructor	Laps	Time/Retired	Grid	Points
1	1	(Germany) Sebastian Vettel	Red Bull-Renault	60	1:31:12.187	1	25
2	9	(Germany) Nico Rosberg	Mercedes	60	+29.823	2	18
3	8	(France) Romain Grosjean	Lotus-Renault	60	+39.892	17	15
4	4	(Brazil) Felipe Massa	Ferrari	60	+41.692	5	12
5	6	(Mexico) Sergio Pérez	McLaren-Mercedes	60	+43.829	9	10
6	10	(United Kingdom) Lewis Hamilton	Mercedes	60	+52.475	3	8
7	7	(Finland) Kimi Räikkönen	Lotus-Renault	60	+1:07.988	6	6
8	14	(United Kingdom) Paul di Resta	Force India-Mercedes	60	+1:12.868	12	4
9	15	(Germany) Adrian Sutil	Force India-Mercedes	60	+1:14.734	13	2
10	19	(Australia) Daniel Ricciardo	Toro Rosso-Ferrari	60	+1:16.237	11	1
11	3	(Spain) Fernando Alonso	Ferrari	60	+1:18.297	8	
12	16	(Venezuela) Pastor Maldonado	Williams-Renault	60	+1:18.951	18	
13	18	(France) Jean-Éric Vergne	Toro Rosso-Ferrari	59	+1 Lap	14	
14	5	(United Kingdom) Jenson Button	McLaren-Mercedes	59	+1 Lap	10	
15	12	(Mexico) Esteban Gutiérrez	Sauber-Ferrari	59	+1 Lap	16	
16	17	(Finland) Valtteri Bottas	Williams-Renault	59	+1 Lap	15	
17	23	(United Kingdom) Max Chilton	Marussia-Cosworth	58	+2 Laps	22	
18	22	(France) Jules Bianchi	Marussia-Cosworth	58	+2 Laps	19	
19	11	(Germany) Nico Hülkenberg	Sauber-Ferrari	54	Gearbox/Brakes	7	
Ret	2	(Australia) Mark Webber	Red Bull-Renault	39	Alternator	4	
Ret	20	(France) Charles Pic	Caterham-Renault	35	Hydraulics	21	
Ret	21	(Netherlands) Giedo van der Garde	Caterham-Renault	1	Collision	20	

- 1 – Nico Hülkenberg retired from the race, but was classified, as he had completed 90% of the race distance.

== Championship standings after the race ==
Drivers' Championship standings

Pos.	Driver	Points
1	(Germany) **Sebastian Vettel**	322
2	(Spain) Fernando Alonso	207
3	(Finland) Kimi Räikkönen	183
4	(United Kingdom) Lewis Hamilton	169
5	(Australia) Mark Webber	148

Constructors' Championship standings

	Pos.	Constructor	Points
	1	(Austria) **Red Bull-Renault**	470
1	2	(Germany) Mercedes	313
1	3	(Italy) Ferrari	309
	4	(United Kingdom) Lotus-Renault	285
	5	(United Kingdom) McLaren-Mercedes	93

- Note: Only the top five positions are included for both sets of standings.
- The 2013 World Champions are marked in bold.

Previous race: 2013 Japanese Grand Prix	FIA Formula One World Championship; 2013 season	Next race: 2013 Abu Dhabi Grand Prix
Previous race: 2012 Indian Grand Prix	Indian Grand Prix	Next race: N/A
