= Lotus F1 =

Former Formula 1 team

Lotus
- Full name: Lotus F1 Team
- Base: Enstone, Oxfordshire, United Kingdom
- Noted staff: James Allison; Dirk de Beer; Éric Boullier; Matthew Carter; Daniele Casanova; Nick Chester; Federico Gastaldi; Nicolas Hennel; Ayao Komatsu; Eric Lux; Gérard Lopez; Jarrod Murphy; Alan Permane; Ciaron Pilbeam; Simon Rennie; Iñaki Rueda; Andy Ruhan; Paul Seaby; Mark Slade; Mike Elliot; Martin Tolliday; Naoki Tokunaga
- Noted drivers: (Finland) Kimi Räikkönen (France) Romain Grosjean (Finland) Heikki Kovalainen (Venezuela) Pastor Maldonado (Belgium) Jérôme d'Ambrosio
- Previous name: Lotus Renault GP
- Next name: Renault Sport F1 Team

Formula One World Championship career
- First entry: 2012 Australian Grand Prix
- Races entered: 77
- Engines: Renault, Mercedes
- Constructors' Championships: 0 (best finish: 4th, 2012 & 2013)
- Drivers' Championships: 0
- Race victories: 2
- Podiums: 25
- Points: 706
- Pole positions: 0
- Fastest laps: 5
- Final entry: 2015 Abu Dhabi Grand Prix

Lotus F1 Team was a British Formula One racing team. The team competed under the Lotus name from 2012 until 2015, following the renaming of the former Renault team based at Enstone in Oxfordshire. The Lotus F1 Team was majority owned by Genii Capital. Lotus F1 was named after its branding partner Group Lotus. The team achieved a race victory and fourth position in the Formula One Constructors' World Championship in their first season under the Lotus title. Lotus F1 achieved 2 race victories in their time on the grid, both courtesy of Kimi Räikkönen. The team was sold back to Renault on 18 December 2015. The Lotus F1 Team name was officially dropped on 3 February 2016, as Renault announced that the team would compete as Renault Sport Formula One Team.

== Background ==
=== Origins ===
The team's Formula One history started in 1981 as the Toleman Motorsport team, based in Witney, Oxfordshire, England. In 1986, the team was renamed to Benetton Formula, following its purchase in 1985 by the Benetton family. In 1992/3, the team moved a few miles to a new base in Enstone. Michael Schumacher won the Drivers' Championship with the team in both 1994 and 1995. In 1995, the team also won the Constructors' Championship, with Johnny Herbert driving alongside Schumacher.

Renault purchased the Benetton team in 2000, and in 2002, they renamed it the Renault F1 Team. In both 2005 and 2006, Fernando Alonso won the Drivers' Championship with the team, and the team won the Constructors' Championship (with Giancarlo Fisichella as their other driver).

Starting with the Lotus E20, the team has recognised these achievements by placing three gold stars in the livery of their car, located just forward of the cockpit. At the end of 2009, Renault sold a majority stake in the team to Genii Capital. Since 2011, Lotus Cars became involved with the team and the team was renamed, first to "Lotus Renault GP" for 2011 season, and then to "Lotus F1 Team" for 2012 season. When discussing the history of the organisation as a whole rather than those of specific constructors it has operated, the colloquialism "Team Enstone" is generally used.

=== Lotus in Formula One ===
Team Lotus, a sister company of Lotus Cars, competed in Formula One between 1958 and 1994, winning seven constructors' titles and six drivers' titles between 1963 and 1978.

The Lotus name returned to Formula One in 2010 through Tony Fernandes's Lotus Racing team, which used the name on licence from Group Lotus. Group Lotus later terminated the licence for the 2011 season, but Fernandes acquired the privately owned Team Lotus name and used it. For 2012, Team Lotus changed their name to Caterham F1 Team, clearing the way for the Lotus Renault GP team to be renamed as "Lotus F1 Team".

== History ==
=== 2012 season ===
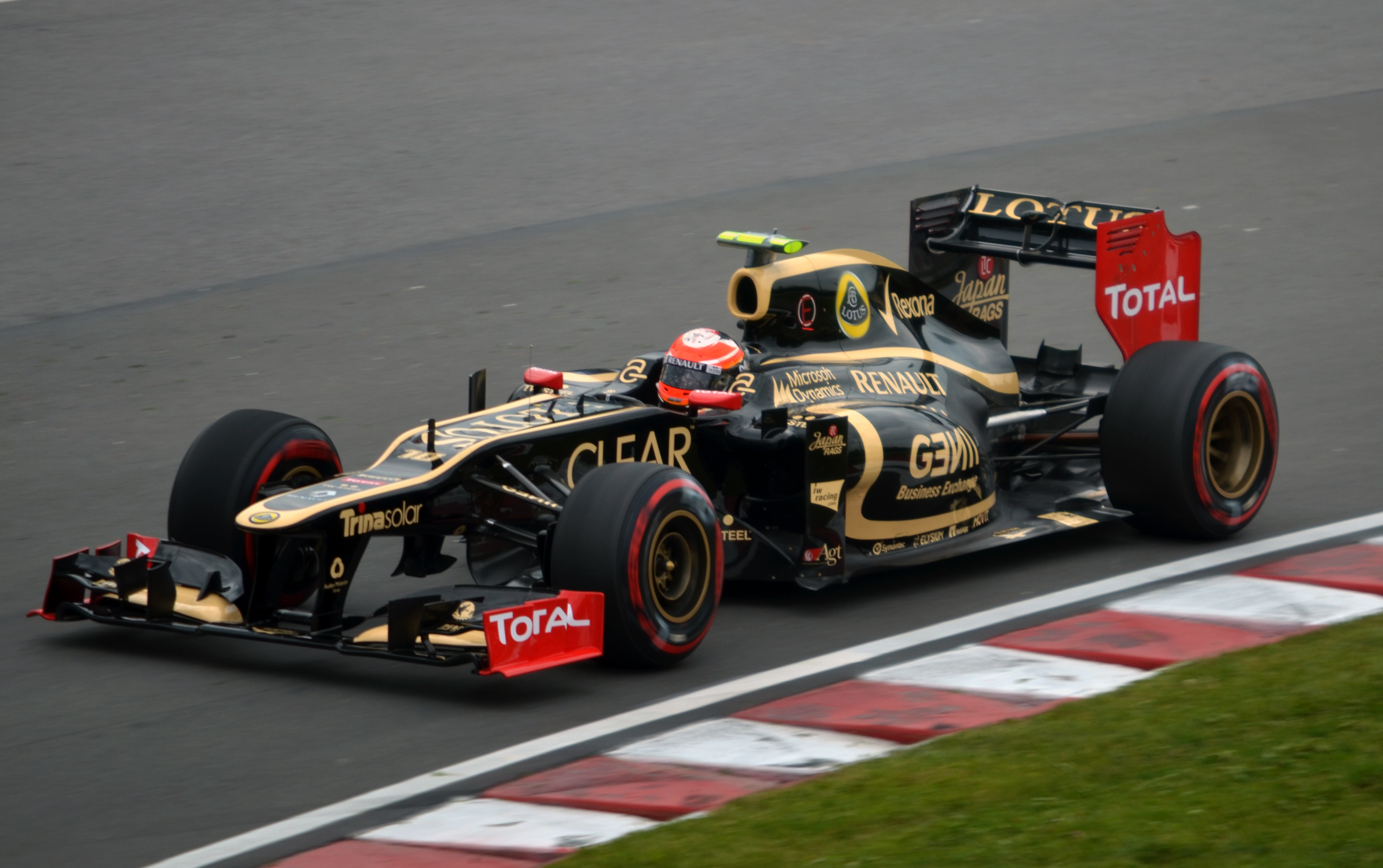
Romain Grosjean in FP1 of the 2012 Canadian Grand Prix race weekend; he would later claim his second podium.

On 29 November 2011, the team announced that Kimi Räikkönen would race for them in 2012 as he returned from a two-year stint away from Formula One which he spent competing in the World Rally Championship; Räikkönen signed for two years with a third year option. On 9 December 2011 the team announced that GP2 Series champion and 2009 Renault F1 driver Romain Grosjean would race alongside Räikkönen. Renault would remain as an engine supplier but no longer free engines instead of paying engine package lease about 70%.

At the start of the season, the team was involved in a protest over the use of a "radical" rear wing concept on Mercedes AMG's Mercedes F1 W03, later dubbed the 'F-duct rear wing' or 'Double DRS'. The dispute was not settled until the third race in China when the stewards unanimously rejected their formal protest and Lotus subsequently confirmed they would not appeal against the decision.

Lotus started the season strongly with Grosjean qualifying third in Australia but first lap incidents in Australia and Malaysia ruined his chances of his first Formula One points. In China Räikkönen was running in second until his tyres 'fell off the cliff' pushing him out of the points for the only time of the season. In Bahrain, Lotus achieved their first podiums of the season with Räikkönen very close to the winner Vettel and Grosjean behind in third. In Monaco Grosjean was involved in another first lap incident but in Canada he worked a one-stop strategy perfectly to take second position, his best Formula One finish. A race later in Valencia Grosjean was running in second until a mechanical problem put him out of the race after a safety car period leaving Räikkönen to take another podium for second.

In Germany, Hungary and Belgium Räikkönen took 3 podiums in a row. In Hungary he and Grosjean had an inter-team battle after a round of pit stops. In the end Räikkönen finished ahead in second with Grosjean scoring his third podium with third.

At the 2012 Belgian Grand Prix, Grosjean was involved in a multiple car pileup at the start of the race, resulting in Grosjean, Lewis Hamilton, Fernando Alonso and Sergio Pérez all being eliminated from the race and Kamui Kobayashi missing out on a possible podium after starting from the front row for the first time of his career. The incident was started when Grosjean collided with Hamilton on the approach to the La Source corner. After the race, Grosjean was issued with a one race ban covering the next Round at Monza. He was replaced for the race weekend by Lotus reserve driver Jérôme d'Ambrosio.

After a near win in Bahrain, Räikkönen took the team's first victory at the Abu Dhabi Grand Prix. It was also his first race win after returning to Formula One. After finishing in the points in 19 of the 20 races, and achieving 7 podiums (including the win in Abu Dhabi) Räikkönen finished 3rd in the Drivers' Championship with Lotus 4th in the Constructors' Championship.

=== 2013 season ===
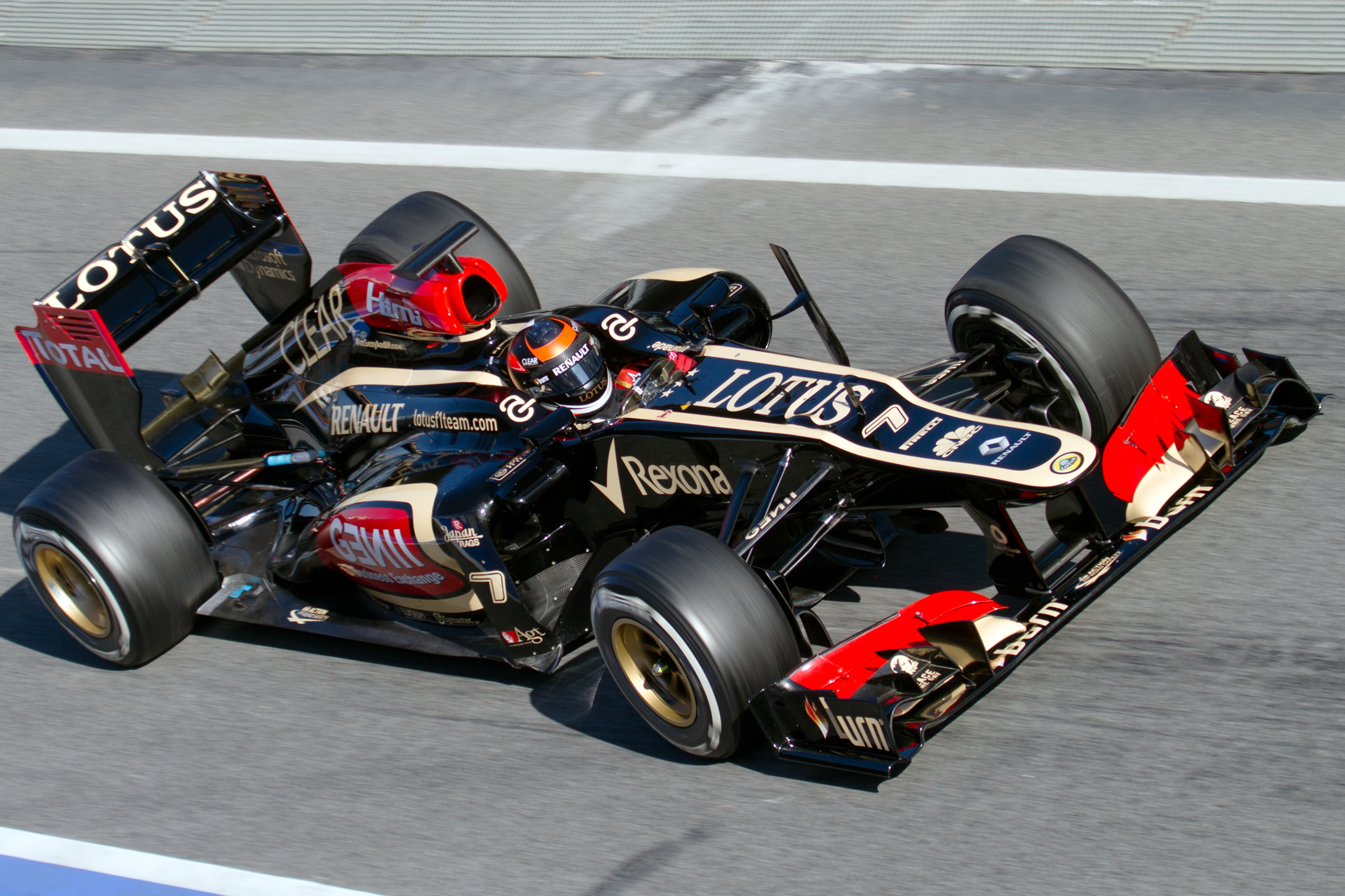
Kimi Räikkönen driving the Lotus E21 during pre-season testing at Catalonia.

On 29 October 2012, Lotus F1 team confirmed that Räikkönen would be racing with the team in 2013. The news came after several weeks of speculation that Räikkönen had several other options for 2013 including other forms of motorsport. Romain Grosjean partnered him in the 2013 season. The 2013 Lotus, the E21, was launched on 28 January at the team's headquarters in Enstone, Oxfordshire, UK. The livery was a little bit different from the previous year's; this year Lotus has a black, gold and red livery, with more visible red as the sidepods, air intake, rear wing and front wing have red on them.

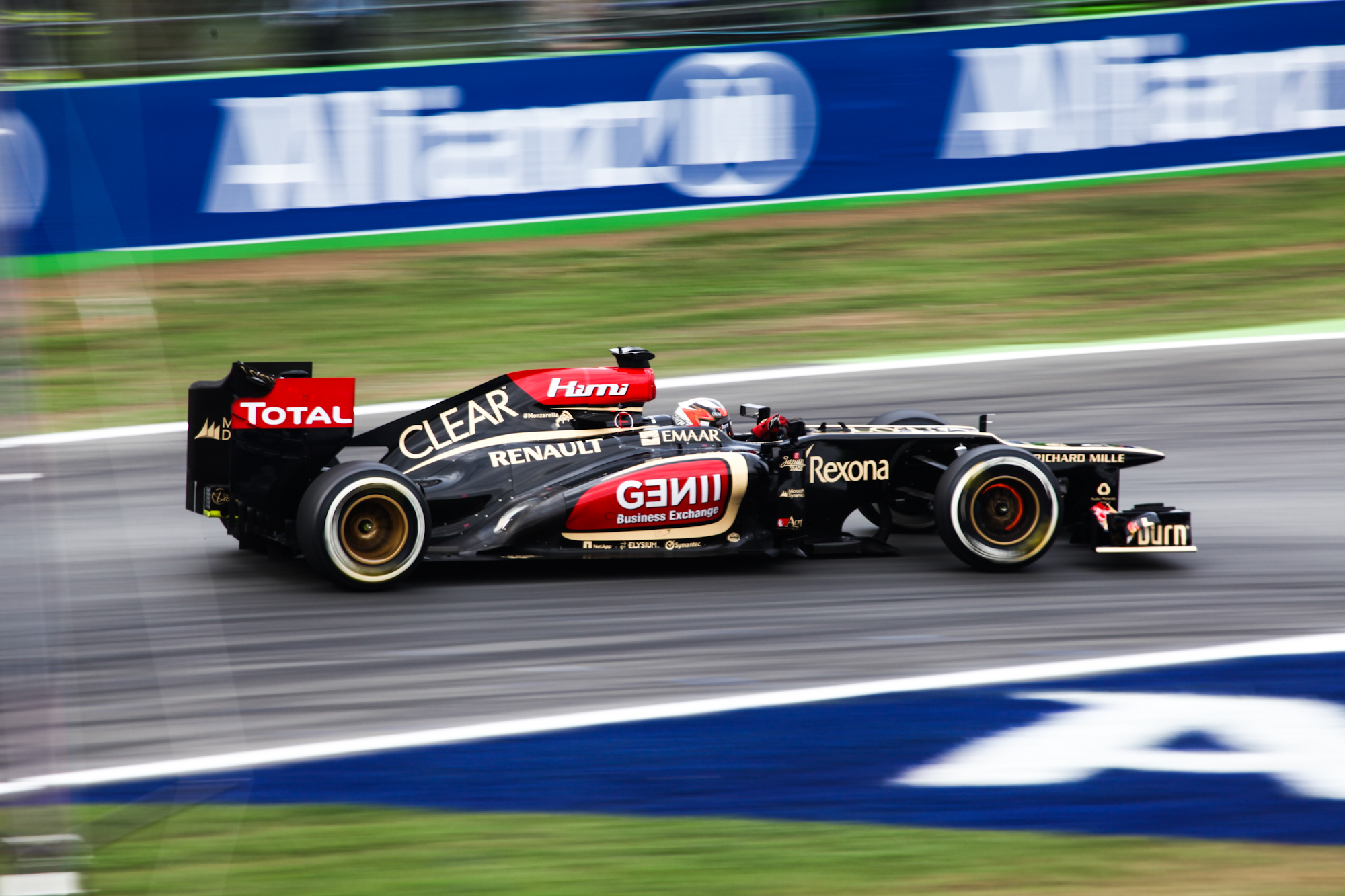
Kimi Räikkönen racing during the 2013 Italian Grand Prix.

In the 2013 Australian Grand Prix, Lotus achieved a first-place finish for Räikkönen despite qualifying in 7th place, thus giving Lotus F1 the leading driver in the Drivers' Championship and second place in the Constructors' Championship. Romain Grosjean, who started the race in 8th place, finished the race in 10th and took one point despite having problems with his car.

After Räikkönen was penalised for impeding Nico Hülkenberg in qualifying and Grosjean failed to make Q3, the Malaysian Grand Prix saw Lotus sit only 10th and 11th on the starting grid. They ultimately finished 7th and 6th respectively.

At the Chinese Grand Prix, Räikkönen qualified and finished 2nd, despite having to regain places after losing two at the start and having damaged the front of his car while battling Sergio Pérez for position; Grosjean finished 8th.

The Bahrain Grand Prix saw a bad qualifying result for both Lotus drivers, but as team principal Eric Boullier had expected, the car had better race pace and both drivers subsequently finished on the podium. The race saw the same top 3 as the previous year. Mansoor Ijaz, head of the Quantum Motorsports consortium, was involved in a proposed but ultimately unsuccessful deal to acquire a 35% stake in the team in summer 2013. The deal, which would have seen Quantum acquire the stake from majority owner Genii Capital, was announced in the summer of 2013 but faced repeated delays. While Ijaz claimed the deal was complete from his side, the transaction was never finalized.

After first corner contact at the start of the 17th round of the championship in Abu Dhabi, Kimi Räikkönen announced that he would be undergoing back surgery and would miss the final two races of the season. His place was taken by Heikki Kovalainen despite initial speculation suggesting that Michael Schumacher would replace him for the United States Grand Prix, something which was ruled out by Schumacher's manager.

=== 2014 season ===
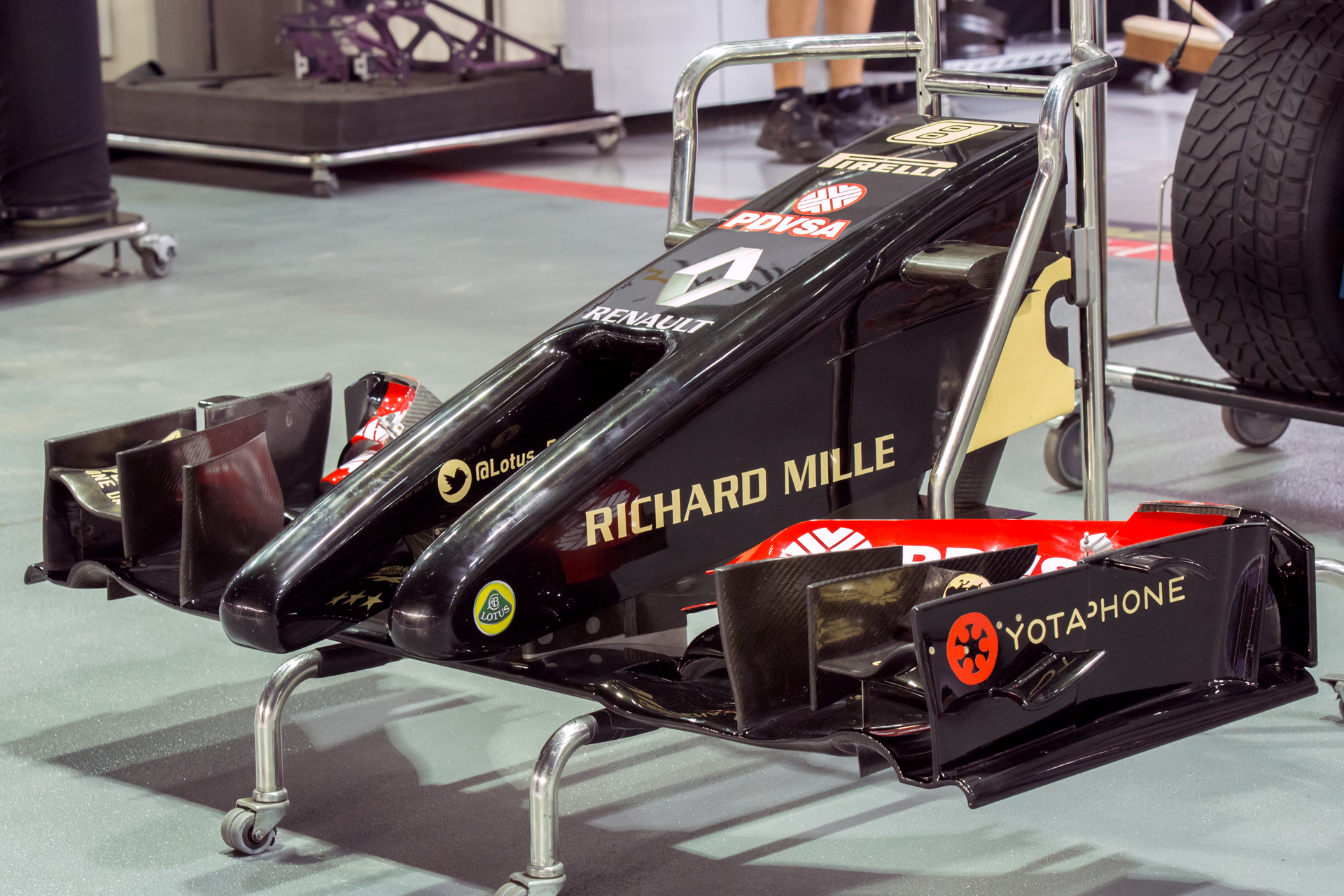
The Lotus E22 was notable for its radical "twin tusk" nose concept.

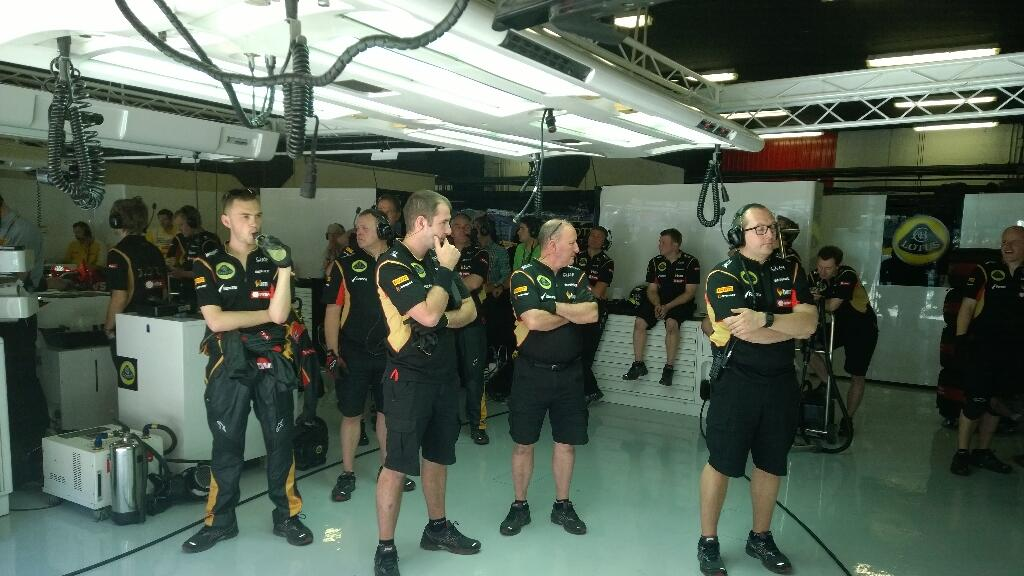
The Lotus F1 garage in 2014

The team undertook a management and ownership change ahead of the 2014 season. Andrew Ruhan, a British property developer who had become co-chairman the previous year, had loaned money to the team, and at the start of the year turned his loans into equity to take effective control of the company from Genii Capital. In addition, Genii sold a 10% stake to Yotaphone, whose logos would appear on the car in 2014. The team's CEO left the team, as did team principal Eric Boullier, who joined McLaren. Ruhan installed Matthew Carter as the new chief executive, who would run the team despite having no previous F1 experience. Gérard Lopez became the titular team principal, and long-term employee Federico Gastaldi became deputy team principal.

Lotus kept Romain Grosjean for 2014, and Pastor Maldonado would join bringing sponsorship from PDVSA. The team struggled throughout the season, finishing eighth in the Constructors' Championship compared to the fourth place they achieved in 2013.

=== 2015 season ===
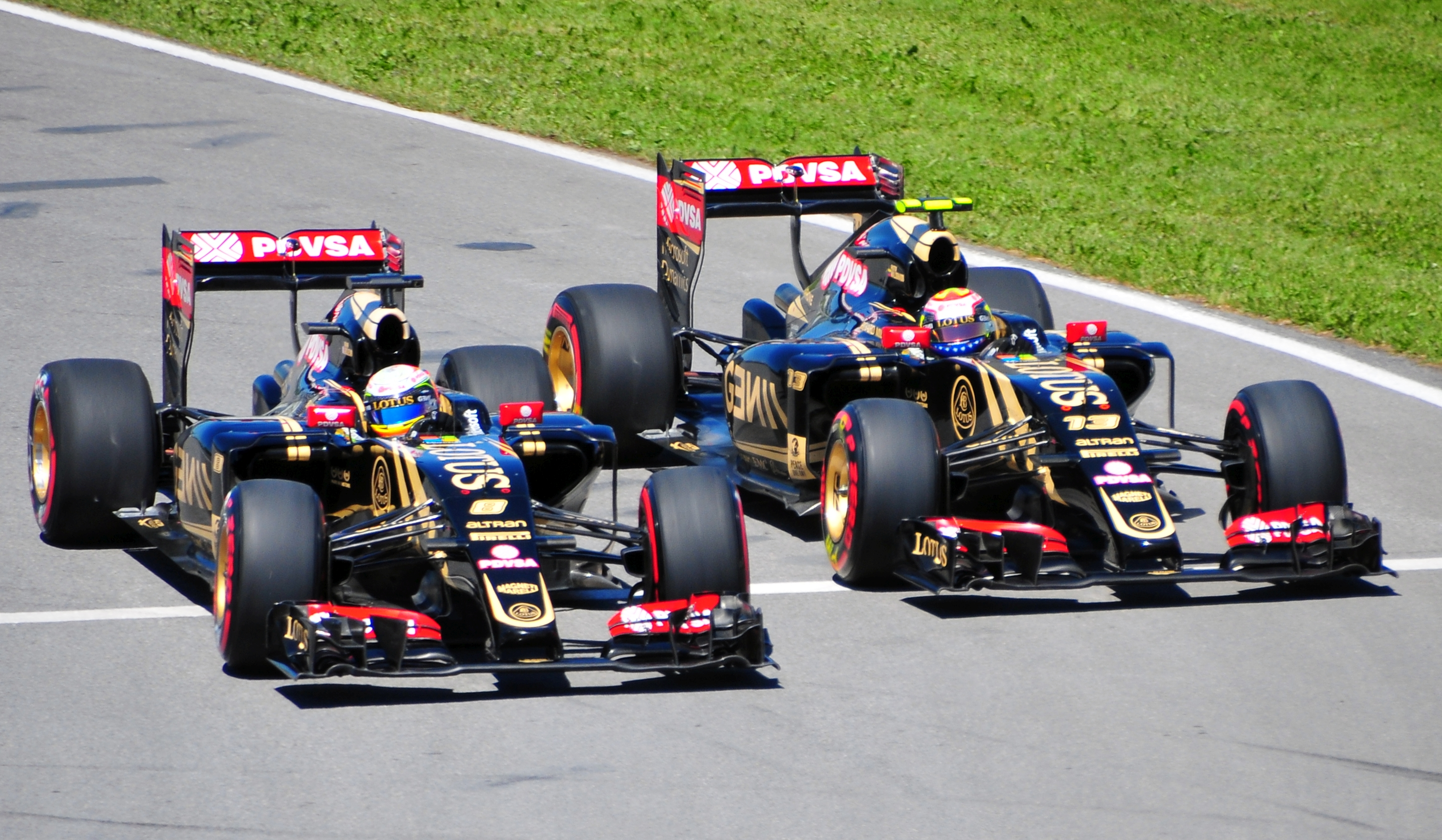
Both Romain Grosjean and Pastor Maldonado exiting the pits during the Canadian GP qualifying session.

On 5 July 2014, Lotus announced that they would be switching to Mercedes engines from the 2015 season, ending the team's 20-year association with Renault. Grosjean and Maldonado remained at the team, with Jolyon Palmer and Carmen Jordá being signed as test and development drivers respectively.

The early part of the season saw driver error and poor reliability cost the team important race results:

The Australian Grand Prix was disappointing start for the Lotus team; by lap 2 both cars had retired. Maldonado retired on lap 1 after a three-car wide tussle resulted in him crashing out at turn two and Grosjean lost power on lap 2.

In Malaysia, Grosjean finished 11th but Maldonado retired due to brake problems.

Grosjean finished 7th at China, his and Lotus's best result since the 2013 United States Grand Prix. On lap 33, Pastor Maldonado, who had been running ahead of his teammate, missed the pit entry on lap 33 and lost time, dropping several positions. He then proceeded to spin his car on lap 39 as he attempted to make up for lost time, and on lap 48 had a collision with Jenson Button following a long battle for position, damaging his car and retiring with rear brake failure a few laps later.

Despite only qualifying 16th and 10th, by lap 41 of the Bahrain Grand Prix, Maldonado and Grosjean had been running in 7th and 8th places respectively, until an issue during the pit entry for Maldonado's last stop meant his car had to be reset and restarted, dropping him to 15th and promoting Grosjean to 7th.

In Spain, both drivers had a great start from 11th and 12th on the grid to be running comfortably inside the top ten. Then on lap 4, contact between the two drivers left Maldonado with a heavily damaged rear wing and, despite a lengthy pitstop in order to reposition the wing, ultimately retired; Grosjean recovered to 8th with only minimal damage.

Maldonado qualified 9th for the 2015 Monaco Grand Prix, but suffered from brake problems in the early laps and retired on lap seven. Grosjean looked set for 10th despite a grid penalty, until an aggressive overtake attempt by Max Verstappen on the start of lap 64 sent Verstappen flying into the barriers and Grojsean into a spin. Grojsean ultimately finished 12th and out of the points.

In Canada, Grosjean and Maldonado qualified in 5th and 6th places respectively on a track where all Mercedes powered cars had a clear advantage over the rest of the field. Maldonado finished 7th after losing a place to Hülkenberg at the start. Grosjean was forced to pit again after cutting his rear left tyre while attempting to lap the Marussia of Will Stevens and dropped from 6th to 11th in the process, but recovered to take 10th place and nevertheless secured Lotus's first double points finish of the season.

In Austria, Grosjean retired with gearbox issues while Maldonado finished 7th from 10th on the grid.

Both cars retired from the British Grand Prix, after a late braking Daniel Ricciardo forced Grosjean into Maldonado during the first few corners of the opening lap.

During the Hungarian Grand Prix weekend deputy team principal Federico Gastaldi confirmed that team owner Gérard Lopez was in deep discussion with Renault board members in an effort to sell the team back to its former owners. Lotus had received their allocation of tyres less than an hour before the opening session at the Hungaroring after Pirelli refused to release the tyres over unpaid bills, amid the team's growing financial difficulties. In the race, Grosjean finished 7th while Maldonado finished 14th after accumulating three penalties during the race.

Grosjean finished third in the Belgian Grand Prix gaining the team's first podium finish since the 2013 United States Grand Prix. However, the Lotus cars were temporarily seized post-race due to a legal dispute with former test driver, Charles Pic.

During the 2015 Japanese Grand Prix, Lotus were locked out of their hospitality unit, stemming from unpaid bills from the race organizers in Japan from the previous year. On 30 September, it was announced that Renault had signed a letter of intent to buy a controlling stake of Lotus F1 from Genii Capital. This came after Lotus were bailed out by Renault after falling behind in income tax and insurance payments to the British Government. Seventh and eighth places in the race itself gave the team their first double top eight finish since the 2013 Indian Grand Prix.

=== Purchase by Groupe Renault ===
On 21 December 2015 it was officially confirmed on the Lotus F1 Team website that Groupe Renault had re-purchased the Enstone-based team and planned on entering the 2016 season as the official Renault factory team. Renault appointed Jérôme Stoll as chairman and Cyril Abiteboul as managing director.

== Sponsorship and livery ==
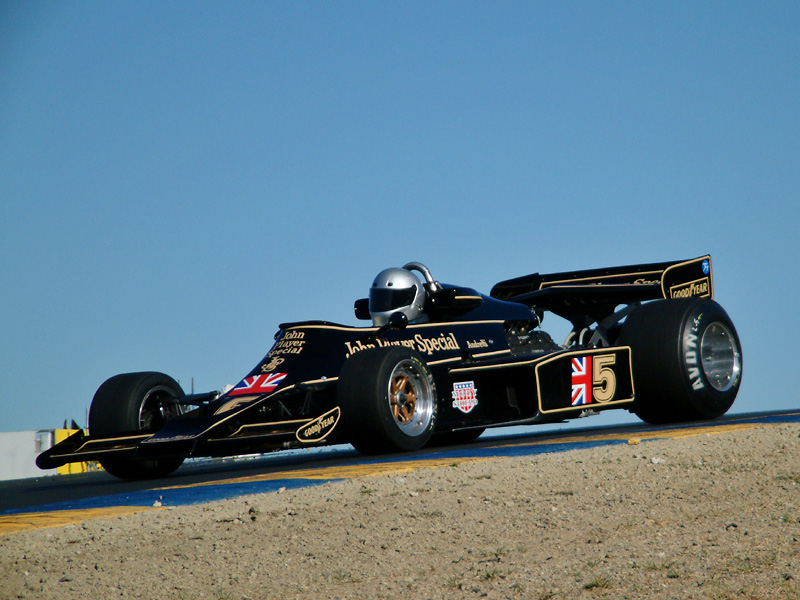
Lotus F1's livery was based on the John Player Special livery used by Team Lotus in the 1970s and 1980s.

The Lotus F1 Team competed in a black-and-gold livery inspired by that of Team Lotus – the motorsport sister company of its naming and branding partner Group Lotus – when it was sponsored by tobacco brand John Player Special during the 1970s and 1980s. However, in April 2012 it was announced this sponsorship agreement had been prematurely terminated although the team would continue to use the Lotus name until at least 2017.

In March 2013, days before the launch of the new Lotus E21, American conglomerate Honeywell pulled out of a reported €50 million sponsorship agreement with the team.

In 2014, again without a title sponsor, each car's title sponsor space was instead shared race by race by existing sponsors alongside temporary sponsors Interwetten (Germany and Hungary) and Hisense (Italy, United States and Abu Dhabi), as well as paying homage to the El Greco exhibition at the Spanish Grand Prix.

Its sponsors included French car brand Renault (though during the 2015 season, the team had Mercedes power), oil company and Romain Grosjean sponsorTotal (though not shown on the car in the 2015 season as the Mercedes engines used Petronas fuel), Chinese solar energy company Trina Solar, Advanced Global Trading, Microsoft Dynamics, French fashion brand Japan Rags, luxury watch brand Richard Mille, Symantec, Avanade and Unilever Personal care brands Rexona and Clear. The later two companies switching to Williams F1 for 2015. For the 2013 season Lotus signed a deal with the Coca-Cola group brand Burn energy drink and Pastor Maldonado sponsor PDVSA. For 2014, Lotus signed a deal with Saxo Bank.

The team was previously owned by Genii Capital with property investor, Andrew Ruhan having a two percent stake and Russian phone company, Yota Devices having a speculated ten percent share in the company. The company later on was majority owned by Groupe Renault, with Jérôme Stoll as chairmen and Cyril Abiteboul appointed managing director.

== Complete Formula One results ==
(key)

Year	Chassis	Engine	Tyres	Drivers	1	2	3	4	5	6	7	8	9	10	11	12	13	14	15	16	17	18	19	20	Points	WCC
2012	E20	Renault RS27-2012 2.4 V8	P		AUS	MAL	CHN	BHR	ESP	MON	CAN	EUR	GBR	GER	HUN	BEL	ITA	SIN	JPN	KOR	IND	ABU	USA	BRA	303	4th
2012	E20	Renault RS27-2012 2.4 V8	P	(Finland) Kimi Räikkönen	7	5^{F}	14	2	3	9	8	2	5^{F}	3	2	3	5	6	6	5	7	1	6	10	303	4th
2012	E20	Renault RS27-2012 2.4 V8	P	(France) Romain Grosjean	Ret	Ret	6	3	4^{F}	Ret	2	Ret	6	18	3	Ret		7	19^{†}	7	9	Ret	7	Ret	303	4th
2012	E20	Renault RS27-2012 2.4 V8	P	(Belgium) Jérôme d'Ambrosio													13								303	4th
2013	E21	Renault RS27-2013 2.4 V8	P		AUS	MAL	CHN	BHR	ESP	MON	CAN	GBR	GER	HUN	BEL	ITA	SIN	KOR	JPN	IND	ABU	USA	BRA		315	4th
2013	E21	Renault RS27-2013 2.4 V8	P	(Finland) Kimi Räikkönen	1^{F}	7	2	2	2	10	9	5	2	2	Ret	11	3	2	5	7^{F}	Ret				315	4th
2013	E21	Renault RS27-2013 2.4 V8	P	(Finland) Heikki Kovalainen																		14	14		315	4th
2013	E21	Renault RS27-2013 2.4 V8	P	(France) Romain Grosjean	10	6	9	3	Ret	Ret	13	19^{†}	3	6	8	8	Ret	3	3	3	4	2	Ret		315	4th
2014	E22	Renault Energy F1-2014 1.6 V6 t	P		AUS	MAL	BHR	CHN	ESP	MON	CAN	AUT	GBR	GER	HUN	BEL	ITA	SIN	JPN	RUS	USA	BRA	ABU		10	8th
2014	E22	Renault Energy F1-2014 1.6 V6 t	P	(France) Romain Grosjean	Ret	11	12	Ret	8	8	Ret	14	12	Ret	Ret	Ret	16	13	15	17	11	17^{†}	13		10	8th
2014	E22	Renault Energy F1-2014 1.6 V6 t	P	(Venezuela) Pastor Maldonado	Ret	Ret	14	14	15	DNS	Ret	12	17^{†}	12	13	Ret	14	12	16	18	9	12	Ret		10	8th
2015	E23 Hybrid	Mercedes PU106B Hybrid 1.6 V6 t	P		AUS	MAL	CHN	BHR	ESP	MON	CAN	AUT	GBR	HUN	BEL	ITA	SIN	JPN	RUS	USA	MEX	BRA	ABU		78	6th
2015	E23 Hybrid	Mercedes PU106B Hybrid 1.6 V6 t	P	(France) Romain Grosjean	Ret	11	7	7	8	12	10	Ret	Ret	7	3	Ret	13^{†}	7	Ret	Ret	10	8	9		78	6th
2015	E23 Hybrid	Mercedes PU106B Hybrid 1.6 V6 t	P	(Venezuela) Pastor Maldonado	Ret	Ret	Ret	15	Ret	Ret	7	7	Ret	14	Ret	Ret	12	8	7	8	11	10	Ret		78	6th

Notes

- ^{†} – The driver did not finish the Grand Prix, but was classified as he completed over 90% of the race distance.
