= Paul Seaby =

British motorsports executive and mechanic

- Employer: Alpine F1 Team
- Known for: Formula One mechanic and executive
- Title: Factory support manager

Paul Seaby is a British Formula One and motorsports mechanic and motorsport executive. He is currently the Factory Support Manager for the Alpine F1 Team.

== Career ==
Seaby began his Formula One career in the early 1990s with Benetton Formula as a race team mechanic, progressing through a series of trackside roles including number-two mechanic and number-one mechanic in both the race and test team. Seaby was famously engulfed in flames during a pitstop fire for Jos Verstappen at the 1994 German Grand Prix. He remained with the Enstone-based organisation through its transition into Renault ownership, becoming test team chief mechanic, overseeing the team of mechanics at the team's test sessions.

At the start of the 2006 season Seaby was appointed engineering coordinator at Renault F1 Team, acting as a liaison between the factory and trackside groups and managing logistical and operational integration during race events and test programmes. From 2012 to 2017 he served as team manager of Lotus F1 Team which switched back to Renault in 2016, with responsibility for day-to-day race team operations, staffing coordination, regulatory liaison with the FIA, and the organisation of freight, garage infrastructure and event execution.

After stepping back from the team manager role, Seaby became race team factory support manager in 2018, focusing on operational links between the Enstone factory and trackside activities. He has continued in this capacity under the Alpine F1 Team name, supporting car build, reliability coordination and race-weekend logistics.
