= Mark Slade (engineer) =

British Formula One engineer

- Born: 1966 or 1967 (age 59–60)
- Occupation: Race engineer
- Employer: Haas F1 Team
- Known for: Formula One engineer
- Title: Race engineer

Mark Slade (born 1966/1967) is a British Formula One engineer. He was formerly the race engineer for Kevin Magnussen at the Haas F1 Team Formula One team.

== Career ==
Slade graduated with a degree in mechanical engineering from Heriot-Watt University and from 1989 worked as a design engineer for Reynard Racing Cars and later Ralt Racing, before joining McLaren in 1991. Slade took up a trackside role with McLaren in 1994 as assistant race engineer to Martin Brundle.

Slade became Mika Häkkinen's race engineer in 1998 and helped the Finnish driver to two world championships and remained at McLaren until 2009, working for Kimi Räikkönen, Fernando Alonso and Heikki Kovalainen as racing engineer. In 2010, Slade moved to Renault to work as Vitaly Petrov's race engineer and in 2011 he moved to Mercedes as Michael Schumacher's race engineer. In 2012 to 2013, he worked at Lotus as Räikkönen's racing engineer and in 2014 to 2015, he worked as Pastor Maldonado's racing engineer. Slade took over as Renault chief engineer in 2016, after which he worked with Nico Hülkenberg from 2017 to 2019 and Esteban Ocon as race engineer in 2020.

From 2022 to 2024, he worked as race engineer for Kevin Magnussen at the Haas F1 Team, before leaving the team after the 2024 Qatar Grand Prix.
