= DHL Fastest Pit Stop Award =

Formula One award

- Awarded for: Consistently performing fast pit stops over the course of a Formula One season
- Presented by: DHL
- Reward: Trophy
- First award: 2015
- Currently held by: Scuderia Ferrari
- Website: Official website

The DHL Fastest Pit Stop Award is presented annually by the courier, Formula One global partner and logistics provider DHL "to recognize outstanding teamwork and performance from the 'unsung heroes' who make a critically important contribution to the drivers' success on the track", and to award the team "that demonstrates the ability to work with speed and efficiency most consistently" over each event held over the course of the season. First awarded by DHL in 2015, the trophy's official naming patron, it is awarded to the team that consistently performs the fastest pit stops over the course of a season.

Since 2017, a points format based on the World Drivers' Championship and the World Constructors' Championships has determined the award's recipient through consistency. The constructor which records the fastest pit stop of a Grand Prix is awarded 25 points, with the second-quickest team getting 18 points, and the third-fastest squad attaining 15 points. The accolade is presented in the form of a trophy designed by the winner of a sponsored design competition to the winning constructor at an event that takes place at the final round of the season. It has been won by four different teams from four separate nationalities in the eight years it has been awarded. The award is currently held by the Scuderia Ferrari team.

== History ==
=== 2015 ===
Scuderia Ferrari won the inaugural DHL Fastest Pit Stop Award in 2015 with seven fastest pit stops, followed by Red Bull and Mercedes with four each. Ferrari posted the fastest pit stops in Malaysia, Bahrain, Spain, Monaco, Japan, Russia and Mexico. The fastest pit stop turnaround of 2.2 seconds was achieved at the race in the Spanish Grand Prix. The award ceremony took place at the season finale in Abu Dhabi.

=== 2016 ===
Williams set the pace of the award in 2016, by setting nine consecutive fastest pit stops to begin the season, with the fastest pit stop thus far set at 1.92 seconds at the 2016 European Grand Prix. Williams set 5 more fastest pit stops in Germany, Belgium, Malaysia, Japan and Mexico to secure the 2016 DHL Fastest Pit Stop Award.

=== 2017 ===
2017 saw the introduction of a new points system for the DHL Fastest Pit Stop Award. After the final race, Mercedes led the ranking with 472 points, ahead of previous winners Williams (442 points) and Red Bull (344 points), after setting the fastest pit stop in Spain, Belgium, Italy (1–2 finish), Singapore (1–2 finish), the United States and Mexico.

== Winners ==
Key
*	Indicates team won the Formula One World Constructors' Championship that season

DHL Fastest Pit Stop Award winners
Year	Nationality	Constructor	Chassis	Engine	Races	Wins	Points	Margin	Ref
2015	Italian	Ferrari	Ferrari SF15-T	Ferrari	19	7	—N/a	—N/a	
2016	British	Williams	Williams FW38	Mercedes	21	14	—N/a	—N/a	
2017	German	Mercedes*	Mercedes AMG F1 W08 EQ Power+	Mercedes	20	6	472	30	
2018	Austrian	Red Bull Racing	Red Bull Racing RB14	TAG Heuer	21	5	466	63	
2019	Austrian	Red Bull Racing	Red Bull Racing RB15	Honda	21	9	504	65	
2020	Austrian	Red Bull Racing	Red Bull Racing RB16	Honda	17	15	555	291	
2021	Austrian	Red Bull Racing	Red Bull Racing RB16B	Honda	22	13	569	252	
2022	Austrian	Red Bull Racing*	Red Bull Racing RB18	RBPT	22	10	536	107	
2023	Austrian	Red Bull Racing*	Red Bull Racing RB19	Honda RBPT	22	9	543	75	
2024	Austrian	Red Bull Racing	Red Bull Racing RB20	Honda RBPT	24	10	552	119	
2025	Italian	Ferrari	Ferrari SF-25	Ferrari	24	10	559	149	

== Statistics ==
Winners by constructor
Wins	Team	Years
7	Red Bull Racing	2018, 2019, 2020, 2021, 2022, 2023, 2024
2	Ferrari	2015, 2025
1	Williams	2016
1	Mercedes	2017

Winners by nationality
Country	Wins	Teams
Austrian	7	1
Italian	2	1
British	1	1
German	1	1

== See also ==
- DHL Fastest Lap Award
