= 2015 Formula One World Championship =

Motor racing championship

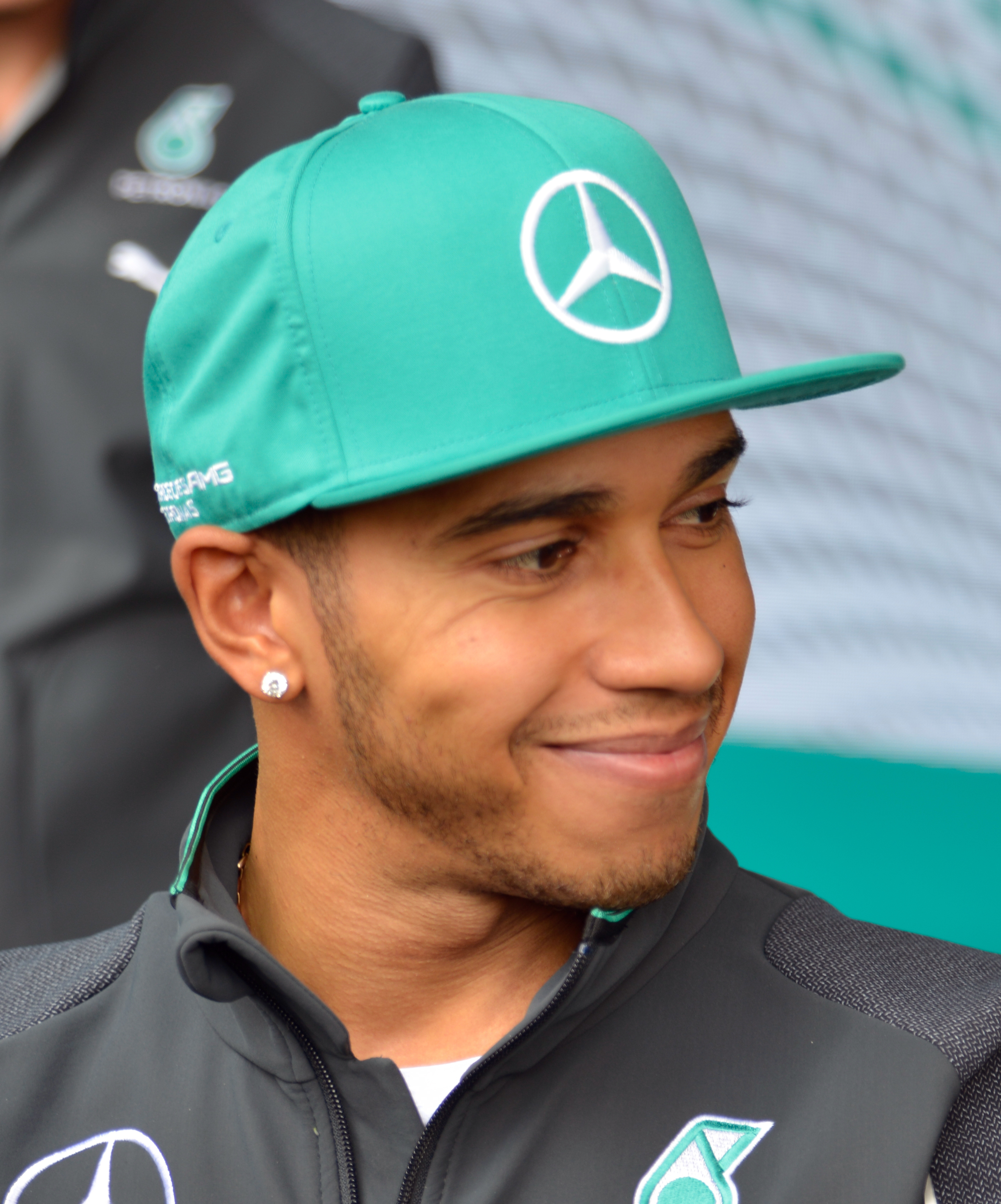
Lewis Hamilton won his third of eventual seven world titles after successfully defending his title after winning the United States Grand Prix.

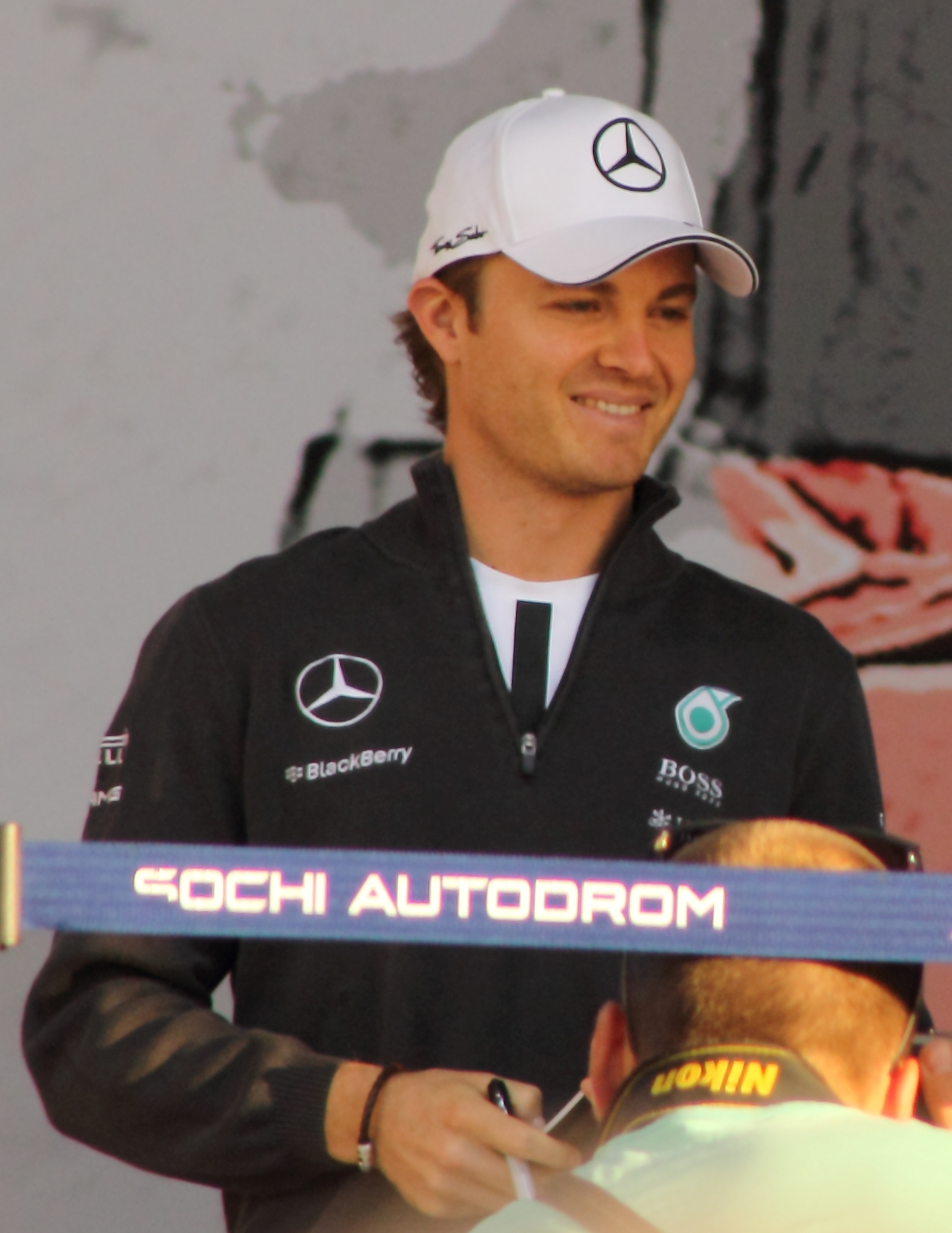
Nico Rosberg, Hamilton's teammate, finished runner up for Mercedes, 59 points behind Hamilton.

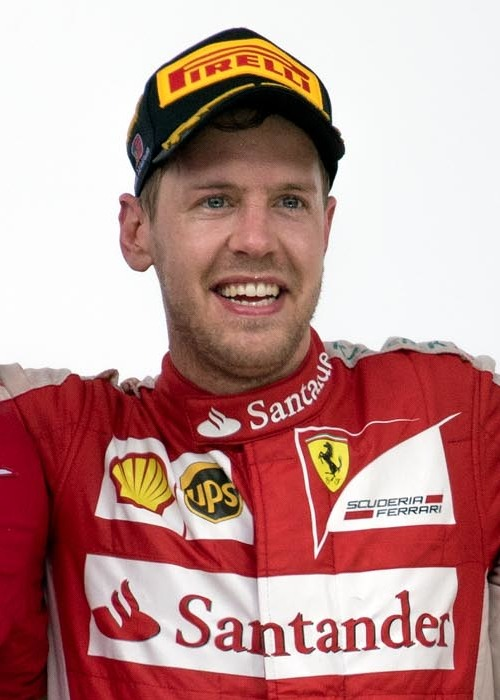
Four-time Champion Sebastian Vettel (pictured celebrating his victory in Malaysia) finished 3rd in his first year with Ferrari.

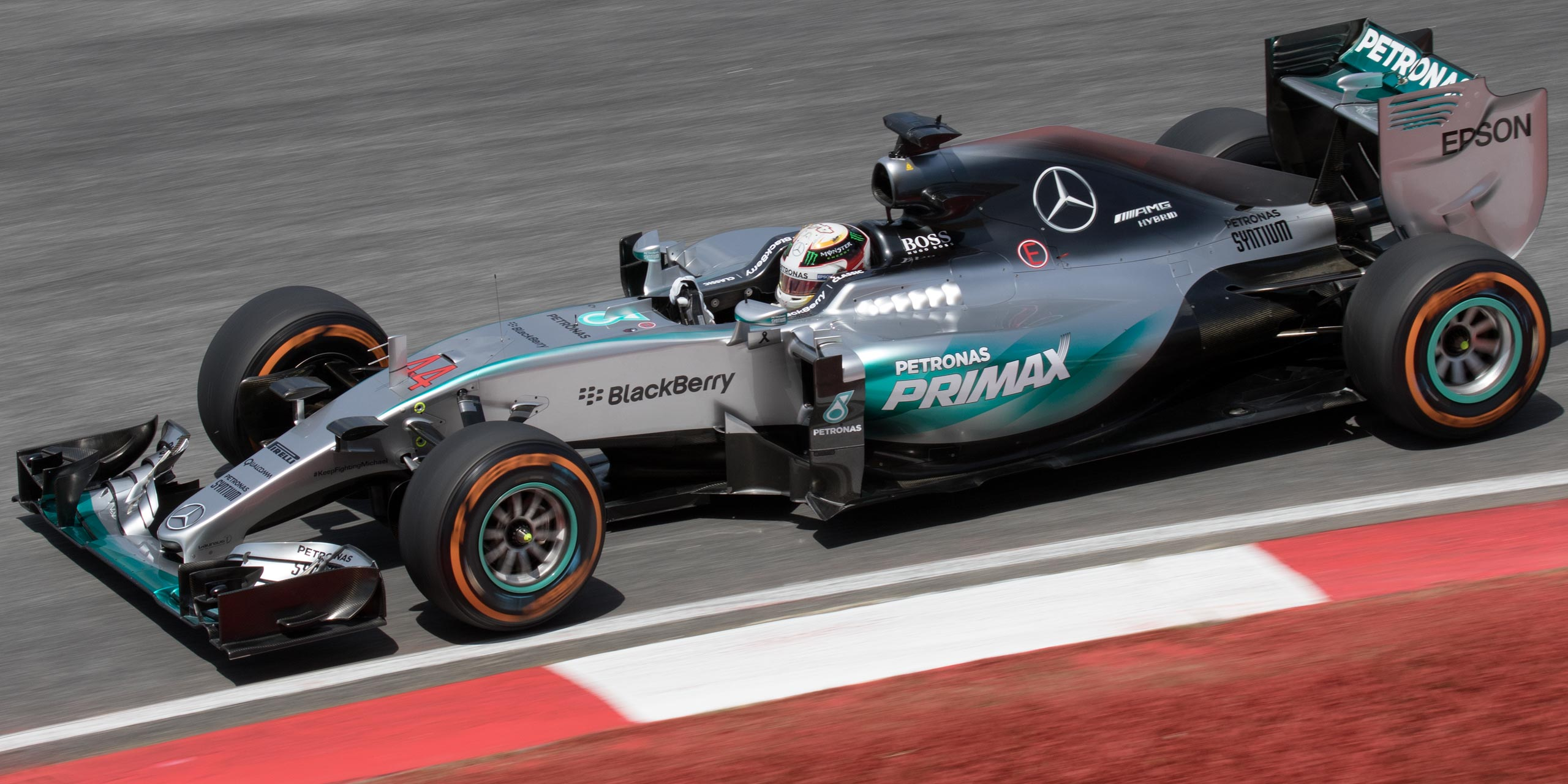
Mercedes won their second consecutive World Constructors' Championship at the Russian Grand Prix with the F1 W06 Hybrid.

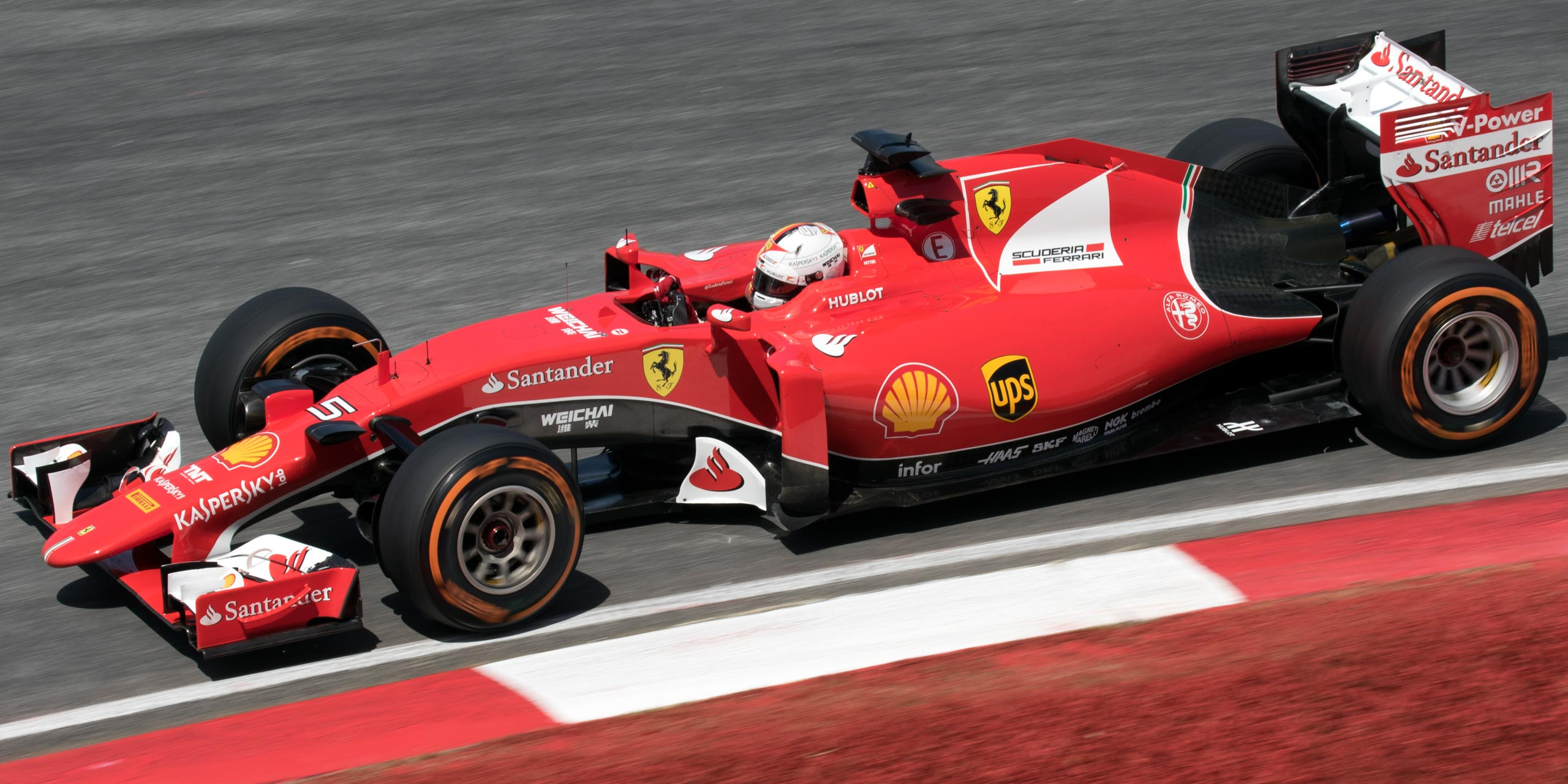
Scuderia Ferrari finished second in the World Constructors' Championship.

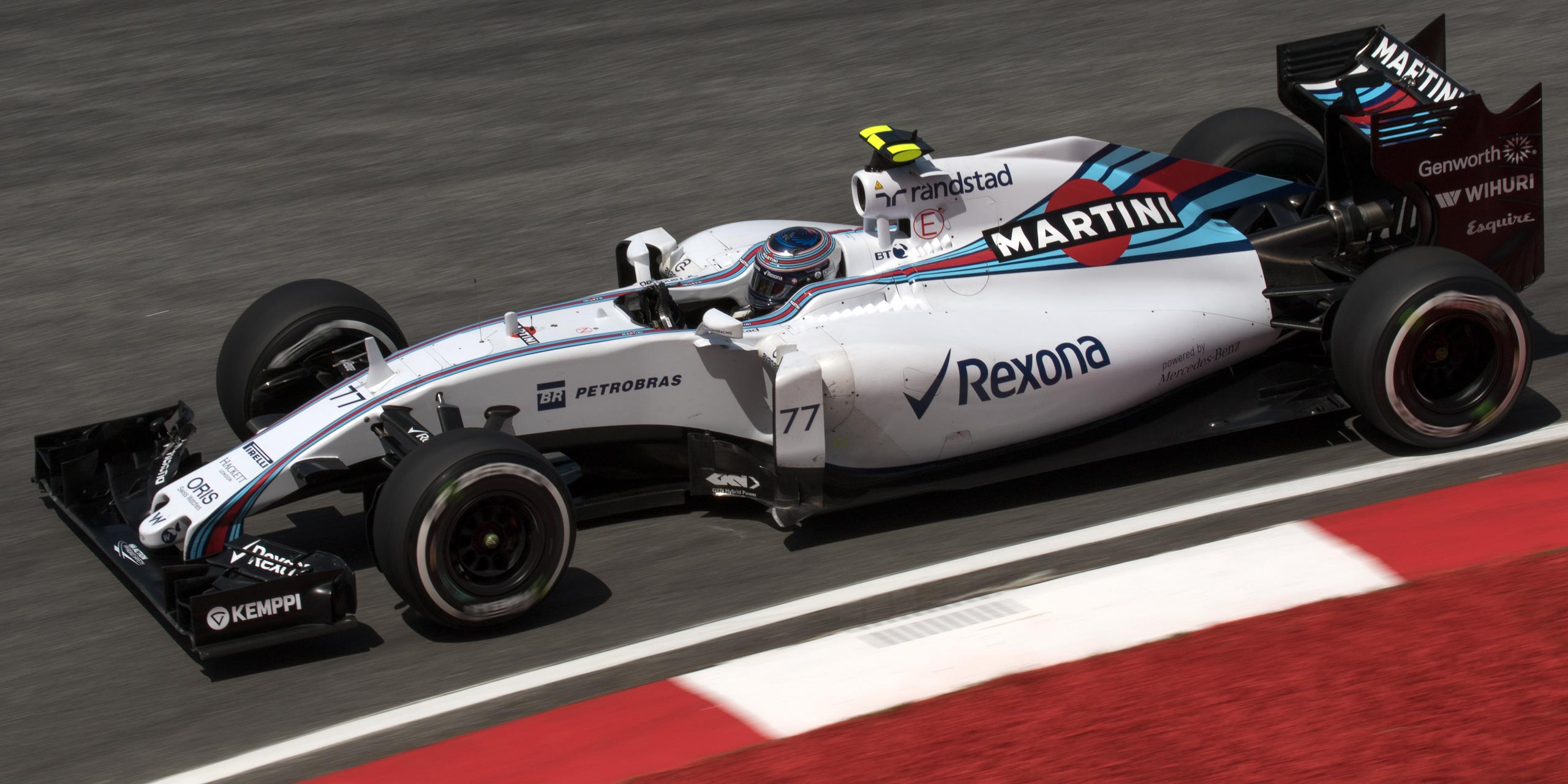
Williams Racing finished third in the World Constructors' Championship.

The 2015 FIA Formula One World Championship was a motor racing championship for Formula One cars. It was the 66th Formula One World Championship recognised by the sport's governing body, the Fédération Internationale de l'Automobile (FIA), as the highest class of competition for open-wheel racing cars. Twenty-two drivers representing 10 teams contested 19 Grands Prix, starting in Australia on 15 March and ending in Abu Dhabi on 29 November as they competed for the World Drivers' and World Constructors' championships.

Lewis Hamilton was the defending Drivers' Champion after securing his second title at the 2014 Abu Dhabi Grand Prix. His team, Mercedes, began the season as the defending Constructors' Champion, having clinched its first championship title at the 2014 Russian Grand Prix.

The calendar featured two significant changes from the 2014 season. The first was the return of the Mexican Grand Prix, held for the first time since 1992. The other change was the cancellation of the German Grand Prix after a venue could not be agreed upon, leaving the nation without a World Championship event for the first time in fifty-five years.

Hamilton secured his third Drivers' Championship with three races left in the season. The runner-up was his teammate Nico Rosberg, 59 points behind, with Ferrari's Sebastian Vettel third, another 44 points adrift. Mercedes AMG Petronas F1 Team clinched the 2015 Constructors' Championship at the Russian Grand Prix, ahead of Ferrari and Williams, and ended the season with a record 703 points. Hamilton also won the FIA Pole Trophy with a total of 11 pole positions in the season and the DHL Fastest Lap Award. Ferrari won the inaugural DHL Fastest Pit Stop Award. This season was also the first in which future World Champion Max Verstappen competed.

== Teams and drivers ==
The following teams and drivers took part in the 2015 Formula One World Championship. All teams competed with tyres supplied by Pirelli.

Entrant	Constructor	Chassis	Power unit	No.	Race drivers	Rounds
(Italy) Scuderia Ferrari	Ferrari	SF15-T	Ferrari 060	5; 7	(Germany) Sebastian Vettel (Finland) Kimi Räikkönen	All; All
Sahara Force India F1 Team	Force India-Mercedes	VJM08; VJM08B	Mercedes PU106B Hybrid	11; 27	(Mexico) Sergio Pérez (Germany) Nico Hülkenberg	All; All
(United Kingdom) Lotus F1 Team	Lotus-Mercedes	E23 Hybrid	Mercedes PU106B Hybrid	8; 13	(France) Romain Grosjean (Venezuela) Pastor Maldonado	All; All
(United Kingdom) Manor Marussia F1 Team	Marussia-Ferrari	MR03B	Ferrari 059/3	28; 98; 53	(United Kingdom) Will Stevens (Spain) Roberto Merhi (United States) Alexander Rossi	All (Note: Will Stevens and Roberto Merhi were entered for the first round in Australia, but although both they and Marussia were present, they did not compete as the team was unable to complete their cars in time for the event.); 1–12, 15, 19; 13–14, 16–18
(United Kingdom) McLaren Honda	McLaren-Honda	MP4-30	Honda RA615H	20; 14; 22	(Denmark) Kevin Magnussen (Spain) Fernando Alonso (United Kingdom) Jenson Button	1; 2–19; All
(Germany) Mercedes AMG Petronas F1 Team	Mercedes	F1 W06 Hybrid	Mercedes PU106B Hybrid	6; 44	(Germany) Nico Rosberg (United Kingdom) Lewis Hamilton	All; All
(Austria) Infiniti Red Bull Racing Renault	Red Bull-Renault	RB11	Renault Energy F1-2015	3; 26	(Australia) Daniel Ricciardo (Russia) Daniil Kvyat	All; All
(Switzerland) Sauber F1 Team	Sauber-Ferrari	C34	Ferrari 060	9; 12	(Sweden) Marcus Ericsson (Brazil) Felipe Nasr	All; All
(Italy) Scuderia Toro Rosso	Toro Rosso-Renault	STR10	Renault Energy F1-2015	33; 55	(Netherlands) Max Verstappen (Spain) Carlos Sainz Jr.	All; All
(United Kingdom) Williams Martini Racing	Williams-Mercedes	FW37	Mercedes PU106B Hybrid	19; 77	(Brazil) Felipe Massa (Finland) Valtteri Bottas	All; All

=== Free practice drivers ===
Four drivers drove as third or test drivers throughout the season.

Drivers that took part in free practice sessions
Constructor	Practice drivers		
Constructor	No.	Driver name	Rounds
Lotus-Mercedes	30	(United Kingdom) Jolyon Palmer	3–5, 8–12, 14–19
Marussia-Ferrari	42	(Switzerland) Fabio Leimer	10
Sauber-Ferrari	36	(Italy) Raffaele Marciello	2, 5, 9, 16
Williams-Mercedes	41	(United Kingdom) Susie Wolff	5, 9

=== Team changes ===
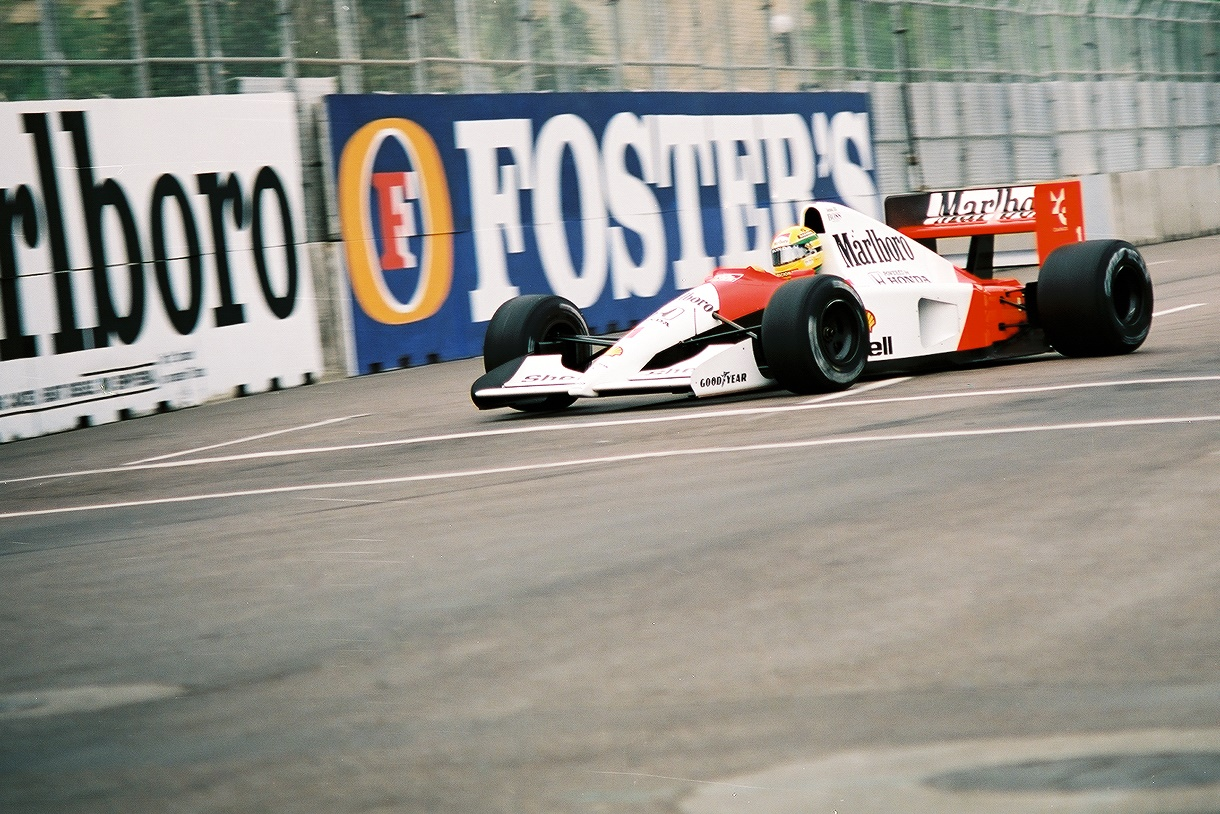
McLaren renewed their co-operation with Japanese manufacturer Honda, twenty-three years since they last competed together. Pictured is the McLaren MP4/6, one of the last cars built by McLaren to use a Honda engine, racing at the 1991 United States Grand Prix.

Several team changes took place before the season began. Both McLaren and Lotus changed engine suppliers for the 2015 season. McLaren ended their 20-year partnership with Mercedes-Benz, in favour of a return to full-works Honda, who had previously supplied them from 1988 until 1992. Honda had been absent for seven years: they had provided British American Racing and Jordan Grand Prix with engines until they purchased the former in 2006 and then had competed as a constructor until 2008 and thus a Japanese-licensed engine manufacturer returned to the sport for the first season since 2009 when Toyota was the last Japanese-licensed engine manufacturer to compete.

Lotus ended its association with Renault in favour of a deal with Mercedes. This ended a 20-year involvement of Renault with the Enstone-based team, (which operated as Benetton from 1992 until 2001, as Renault from 2002 until 2011 and as Lotus from 2012 until 2015) after being an engine supplier to Benetton since 1995, and being the owner of the team from 2002 to 2010.

Both Caterham F1 and Marussia went into administration towards the end of the 2014 season. The latter was saved narrowly from liquidation in February 2015, re-entering as Manor Marussia, when new investment was secured and the team left administration after an agreement with creditors was reached. Caterham ultimately folded and its assets were auctioned off by company administrators after the start of the season.

=== Driver changes ===
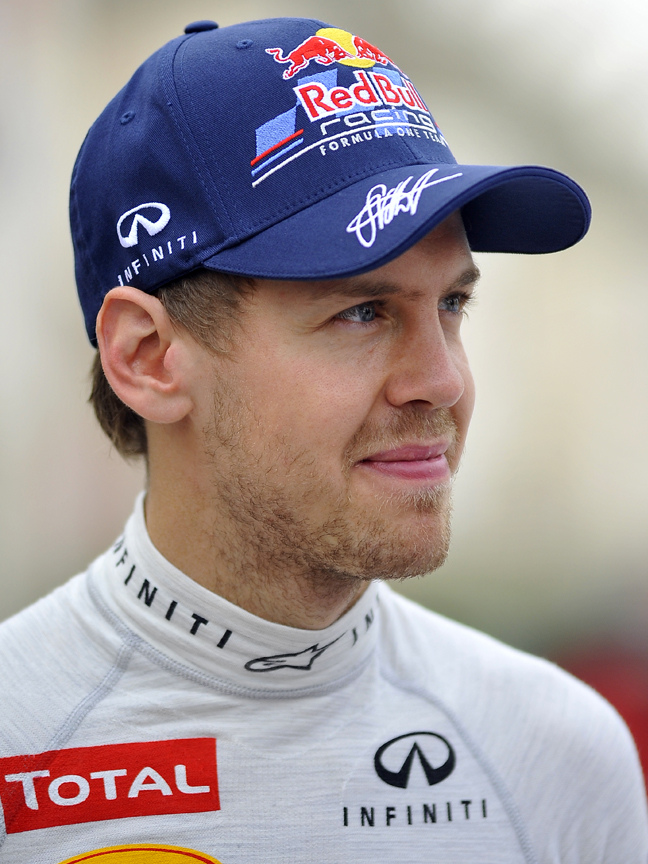
Sebastian Vettel (pictured in 2012) left Red Bull Racing – the team with which he won four World Drivers' Championships – at the end of the 2014 season to join Ferrari.

The driver line-ups saw a couple of changes prior to the 2015 season and one more prior to the Singapore Grand Prix. Sebastian Vettel left Red Bull Racing at the end of the 2014 season after six years with the team and nine years with its wider junior development programme to join Scuderia Ferrari in a multi-year deal replacing Fernando Alonso. However, the news would be firstly announced by Christian Horner in an interview with Sky Sports days after Vettel had told him of the move. Alonso, who was still in negotiations with the team, was caught blindsided. Alonso would then replace Kevin Magnussen at McLaren, returning to the team after he last raced for them in 2007. Following an accident during pre-season testing, Alonso withdrew from the season-opening Australian Grand Prix, and Magnussen returned as his temporary replacement. Daniil Kvyat was promoted to Red Bull from Toro Rosso to fill the vacated seat.

Toro Rosso changed their entire line-up: along with Kvyat joining Red Bull, the team chose not to renew Jean-Éric Vergne's contract. Vergne went on to compete in the Formula E Championship while also becoming a Ferrari development driver. They were replaced by the 2014 Formula Renault 3.5 Series champion Carlos Sainz Jr. and the 2014 FIA Formula 3 European Championship third-place finisher Max Verstappen. The latter became the youngest driver to make a Formula One début, at the age of 17 years, 164 days when he started the season.

Esteban Gutiérrez and Adrian Sutil were released from Sauber, where they were replaced by the former Caterham driver Marcus Ericsson and the GP2 driver Felipe Nasr. Gutiérrez and Sutil went on to join Ferrari and Williams respectively as reserve drivers.

Manor Marussia also had two new drivers: They employed the former Caterham driver Will Stevens to drive for his first full season in the sport, while another former Caterham test driver, Roberto Merhi, was signed to a short-term deal while he also drove in the Formula Renault 3.5 Series. Max Chilton relinquished his seat, joining the Indy Lights championship, while Jules Bianchi was in a coma at the start of the season and ultimately died from injuries sustained at the 2014 Japanese Grand Prix. Alexander Rossi was later drafted in by Manor Marussia to make his Formula One début at the Singapore Grand Prix, replacing Merhi. The Spaniard returned to the team for the Russian and Abu Dhabi Grands Prix, sharing the car with Rossi for the remainder of the season.

Kamui Kobayashi went on to race in the Super Formula series in Japan after the folding of Caterham left him without a drive in Formula One.

== Calendar ==
The following nineteen Grands Prix took place in 2015:

Round	Grand Prix	Circuit	Date
1	Australian Grand Prix	(Australia) Albert Park Circuit, Melbourne	15 March
2	Malaysian Grand Prix	(Malaysia) Sepang International Circuit, Kuala Lumpur	29 March
3	Chinese Grand Prix	(China) Shanghai International Circuit, Shanghai	12 April
4	Bahrain Grand Prix	Bahrain International Circuit, Sakhir	19 April
5	Spanish Grand Prix	(Spain) Circuit de Barcelona-Catalunya, Montmeló	10 May
6	Monaco Grand Prix	Circuit de Monaco, Monte Carlo	24 May
7	Canadian Grand Prix	(Canada) Circuit Gilles Villeneuve, Montreal	7 June
8	Austrian Grand Prix	(Austria) Red Bull Ring, Spielberg	21 June
9	British Grand Prix	(United Kingdom) Silverstone Circuit, Silverstone	5 July
10	Hungarian Grand Prix	(Hungary) Hungaroring, Mogyoród	26 July
11	Belgian Grand Prix	(Belgium) Circuit de Spa-Francorchamps, Stavelot	23 August
12	Italian Grand Prix	(Italy) Autodromo Nazionale di Monza, Monza	6 September
13	Singapore Grand Prix	Marina Bay Street Circuit, Singapore	20 September
14	Japanese Grand Prix	(Japan) Suzuka Circuit, Suzuka	27 September
15	Russian Grand Prix	(Russia) Sochi Autodrom, Sochi	11 October
16	United States Grand Prix	(United States) Circuit of the Americas, Austin, Texas	25 October
17	Mexican Grand Prix	Autódromo Hermanos Rodríguez, Mexico City	1 November
18	Brazilian Grand Prix	(Brazil) Autódromo José Carlos Pace, São Paulo	15 November
19	Abu Dhabi Grand Prix	(United Arab Emirates) Yas Marina Circuit, Abu Dhabi	29 November

=== Calendar changes ===
Nations that hosted a Grand Prix in 2015 are highlighted in green, with circuit locations marked with black dots. Former host nations are shown in dark grey, and former host circuits are marked with white dots.

Comparison between the configuration of the Autódromo Hermanos Rodríguez last used by Formula One in 1992 (top), and the redeveloped layout used from 2015 (bottom).

There were a few revisions to the calendar from the previous season. The Mexican Grand Prix returned to the Formula One calendar for the first time since 1992. The race was held at the Autódromo Hermanos Rodríguez circuit located in the centre of Mexico City, which was the location of all Mexican Grands Prix in previous decades. The circuit was substantially reconfigured to accommodate the sport's return.

The Grand Prix of America and the Indian Grand Prix were both contracted but did not feature on the calendar. The former originally aimed for a debut in 2013 at the Port Imperial Street Circuit in New Jersey after a 15-year contract was signed, but was delayed for a third straight year, while the latter was cancelled for the second consecutive year due to an unresolved tax case in the Bombay High Court.

The German and Korean Grands Prix were both included on the provisional calendar. The former was set to return to the Nürburgring, in accordance with the event-sharing agreement established between the Nürburgring and the Hockenheimring in 2008. The Nürburgring had previously hosted the race in 2013 and so was scheduled to host it again in 2015, but the venue was left off the provisional calendar, leaving the event-sharing agreement at a stalemate. With both venues unwilling to host the event, the race was ultimately cancelled, leaving the country off the Grand Prix calendar for the first time since 1960. The Korean Grand Prix was scheduled to return to the Formula One calendar after being removed in 2014, but the plan was ultimately abandoned.

== Regulation changes ==
=== Technical ===
==== Power units ====
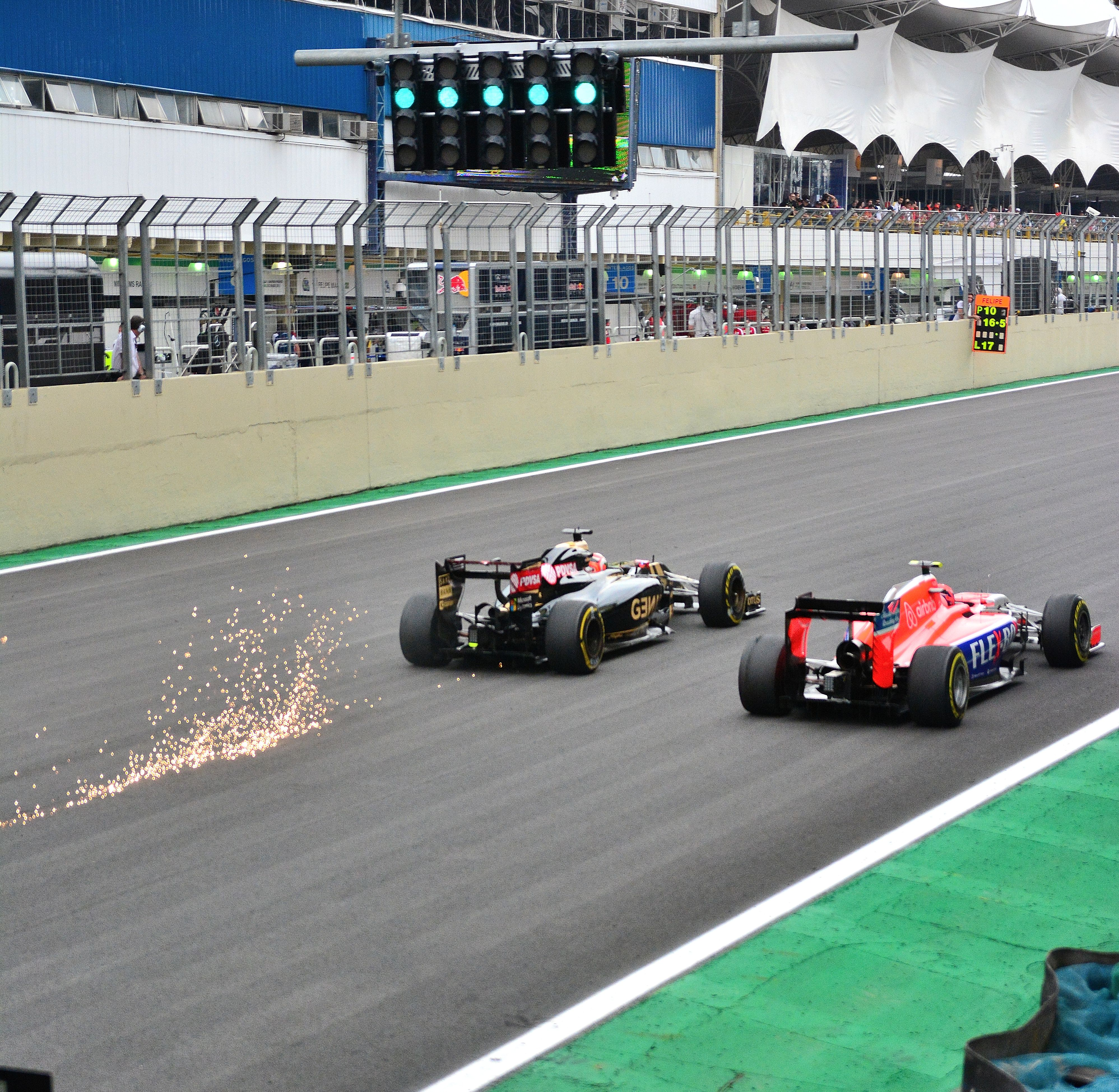
Sparks returned in 2015 due to titanium skid blocks attached to the underside of the cars.

The number of power units a driver could use in a season was reduced from five in 2014 to four in 2015. This was tweaked after the 2015 British Grand Prix, with new power unit manufacturers being allowed one other power unit in their first season of competition; the only manufacturer affected in the 2015 season was Honda, who were allowed to take advantage of the rule even though it had been introduced after the season had begun. The rules regarding engine development that were introduced for the previous season were changed as well, with the manufacturers allowed to perform half the development permitted in 2014.

==== Noses ====
Following the backlash over "ugly" nose designs in 2014, the FIA moved to amend the rules surrounding nose designs for the 2015 season. Noses were lower than in 2014, retaining a minimum cross section, but they had to taper to a point at a fixed linear rate, effectively outlawing the dramatic finger shapes seen in 2014 in favour of a more gradual shape. Furthermore, the design of the nose had to be symmetrical and consistent with the centreline of the car, thereby banning the more exotic designs, such as the "twin-tusk" approach used by Lotus on the E22 chassis.

==== Weight and bodywork ====
The minimum weight of the cars at all times during an event was increased to 702 kilograms (1,548 lb), a difference of 10 kilograms (22 lb) from 2014, addressing concerns raised the year before that the lighter weight limit forced taller drivers to become unhealthily slim. The ban on front-and-rear interconnected suspension systems (FRIC) that had been implemented in the middle of the 2014 season was formalised, with the regulations stating that the front and rear suspension had to be designed in such a way that any change in performance had to be a direct result of a change in load applied solely to them. The anti-intrusion panels on both sides of the survival cell were extended upwards to the rim of the cockpit and alongside the driver's head in order to improve the drivers' safety in event of a side impact. Titanium skid blocks on the underside of the car were made mandatory for the 2015 season, which led to a return of sparks being created by the cars as the underbody touched the track.

=== Sporting regulations ===
==== Penalties ====
Several rules regarding penalties were changed for the 2015 season. The replacement of a complete power unit, exceeding the maximum number allowed per season, no longer resulted in a penalty in itself. Penalties continued to be applied cumulatively for the replacement of individual components of the power unit, and if such a grid place penalty was imposed and the driver's starting position was such that it could not be applied in full, the remainder of the penalty was no longer carried over to the next race, but was instead applied in the form of a time penalty during the race corresponding to the number of grid spaces remaining in the penalty. This was tweaked after the 2015 British Grand Prix with immediate effect, to make demotion to the back of the grid the maximum penalty for engine changes. Additional time penalties to be served during the race were abandoned.

As well as the existing five-second penalty that could be served during a driver's scheduled pit stop, a new ten-second penalty was introduced, to be served in the same manner. If a car was deemed to have been released from a pit stop in an unsafe manner, the driver would receive a ten-second stop-and-go penalty. Further penalties could be applied if the stewards believed the driver was aware of this and attempted to drive the car regardless. If any team personnel or team equipment remained on the grid after the fifteen-second signal had been shown before the start of the formation lap, the driver of the car concerned would have had to start the race from the pit lane. If the driver concerned failed to obey this, they would have received a ten-second stop-and-go penalty.

==== Schedule and points ====
The rules regarding qualifying and the start times of some races were tweaked. The qualifying procedure was further clarified to cater to different sizes of starting grids: if twenty-four cars were entered for the race, seven would have been eliminated after each of the first two qualifying segments; if twenty-two were entered, six would have been eliminated after each qualifying segment and so on if fewer cars were eligible. In light of a regulation introduced in 2014 dictating that a race could not run for more than four hours and following recommendations from the report into Jules Bianchi's accident the previous season, the start times of five Grands Prix were moved forward by an hour so races did not start with less than four hours until dusk. Thus, the Australian, Malaysia, Chinese, Japanese and Russian Grands Prix started an hour earlier than in 2014.

===== Safety innovations =====
There were other changes introduced in a bid to further increase the safety of the sport. In the aftermath of Bianchi's accident, a new procedure called the Virtual Safety Car (VSC) was introduced following trials during the last three Grands Prix of 2014. The procedure could be initiated when double waved yellow flags were needed on any section of a circuit where competitors and officials were in danger, but the circumstances did not warrant deployment of the actual safety car. It obliged drivers to reduce their speed to match one indicated on the displays on their steering wheels. The safety car procedure was amended as well: once the last lapped car had passed the leader, the safety car returned to the pit lane at the end of the following lap. This was a change of the previous practice which required the unlapped cars to have caught up with the back of the pack before the safety car could return to the pit lane.

If a race were suspended (red-flagged), the cars would no longer have lined up on the grid but instead would have slowly proceeded to the pit lane. The pit exit would have been closed and the first car to arrive in the pit lane would have proceeded to the exit with the others lining up behind in the order in which they arrived, regardless of race standing or garage location. Severe circumstances could still have required cars to stop immediately on track.

===== Other =====
Beginning with the Belgian Grand Prix, radio communication from engineers to drivers pertaining to race starts, such as recommended torque map settings for optimal acceleration, was no longer allowed. This restriction added to the partial radio ban implemented at the end of the previous season. Drivers were also no longer permitted to change the design of their helmet in-season. The time limit rule was also adjusted, so that after races reached two hours and the leader completed a lap, an additional full lap would be run before the race ended.

== Season report ==
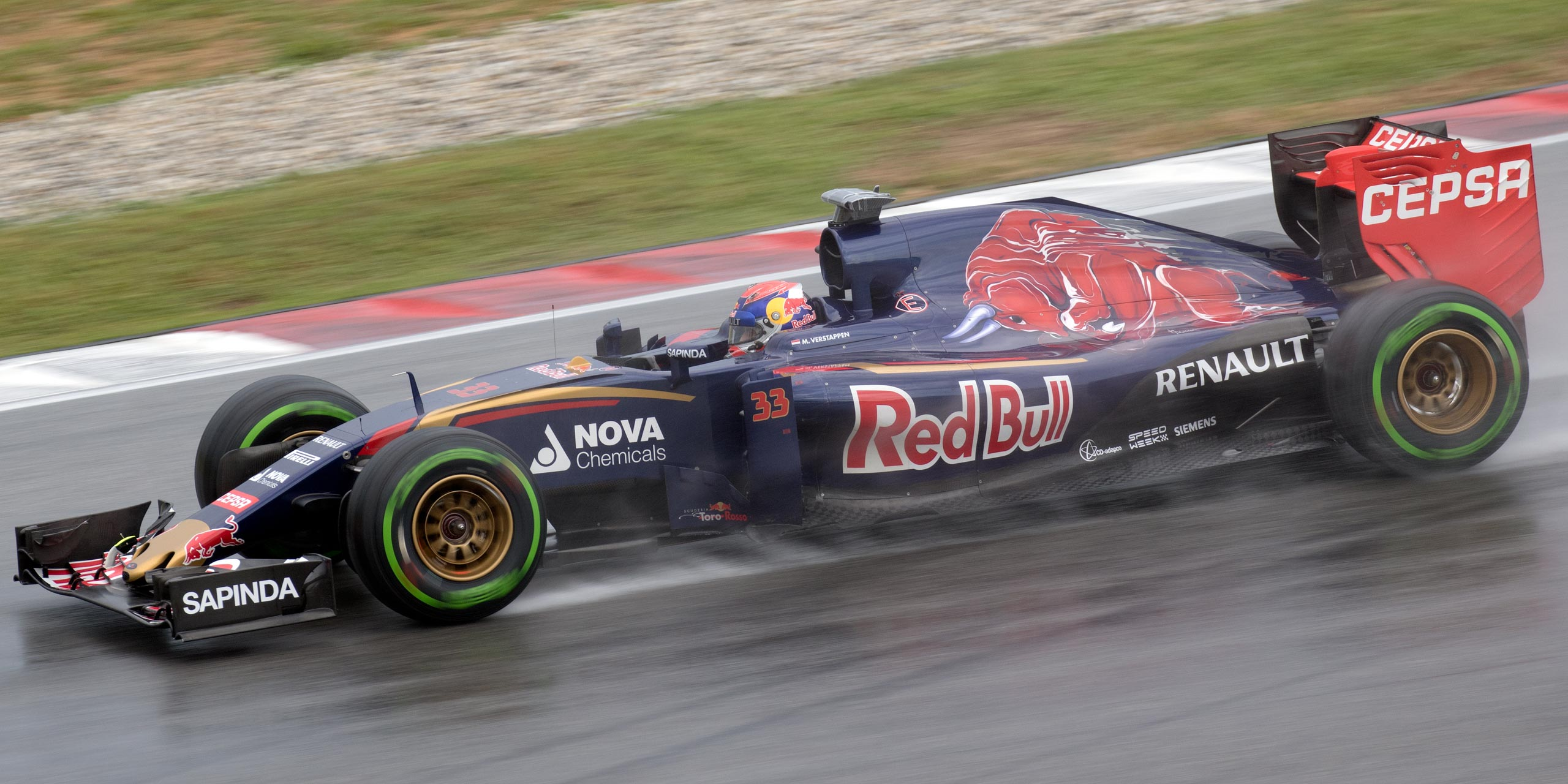
Max Verstappen (pictured at the Malaysian Grand Prix) set two records in his first two races: youngest driver to start a race, and youngest driver to score points.

=== Pre-season ===
Lewis Hamilton was the defending Drivers' Champion after securing his second title at the 2014 Abu Dhabi Grand Prix. His team, Mercedes, began the season as the defending Constructors' Champion, having clinched its first championship title at the 2014 Russian Grand Prix.

Before the start of the season, Hamilton announced he would not be exercising his option of switching his car number to 1 for 2015, as was his prerogative as reigning World Champion, and would instead race with his career number 44. It was the first season since 1994, when Alain Prost retired from the sport following his fourth and final World Drivers' Championship title in 1993, that the field did not contain a number one car.

Following the financial struggles faced by Marussia and Caterham in 2014, the FIA approved the use of 2014-specification chassis in 2015 provided that teams showed cause and received an individual dispensation to compete with their old chassis. A request by Manor Marussia to use their 2014 car was rejected by the other teams. Subsequent regulation changes allowed the team to use a modified 2014 chassis which met updated safety and dimensional limits. The car was powered by a 2014 specification Ferrari power unit, with a new chassis to be introduced later in the season. However, following the twelfth round, Manor Marussia elected to abandon those plans in favour of developing the car for the following season.

McLaren's Fernando Alonso was involved in a pre-season testing accident that saw the two-time World Drivers' Champion hospitalised. McLaren claimed the crash was caused by a sudden gust of wind disrupting the car's downforce, while Alonso insisted the crash was caused by his steering wheel locking up. On physicians' advice, Alonso elected to sit out the opening round in Australia, prompting the team to replace him with Kevin Magnussen for the race. Alonso was cleared to race by the second round in Malaysia.

=== Championship ===
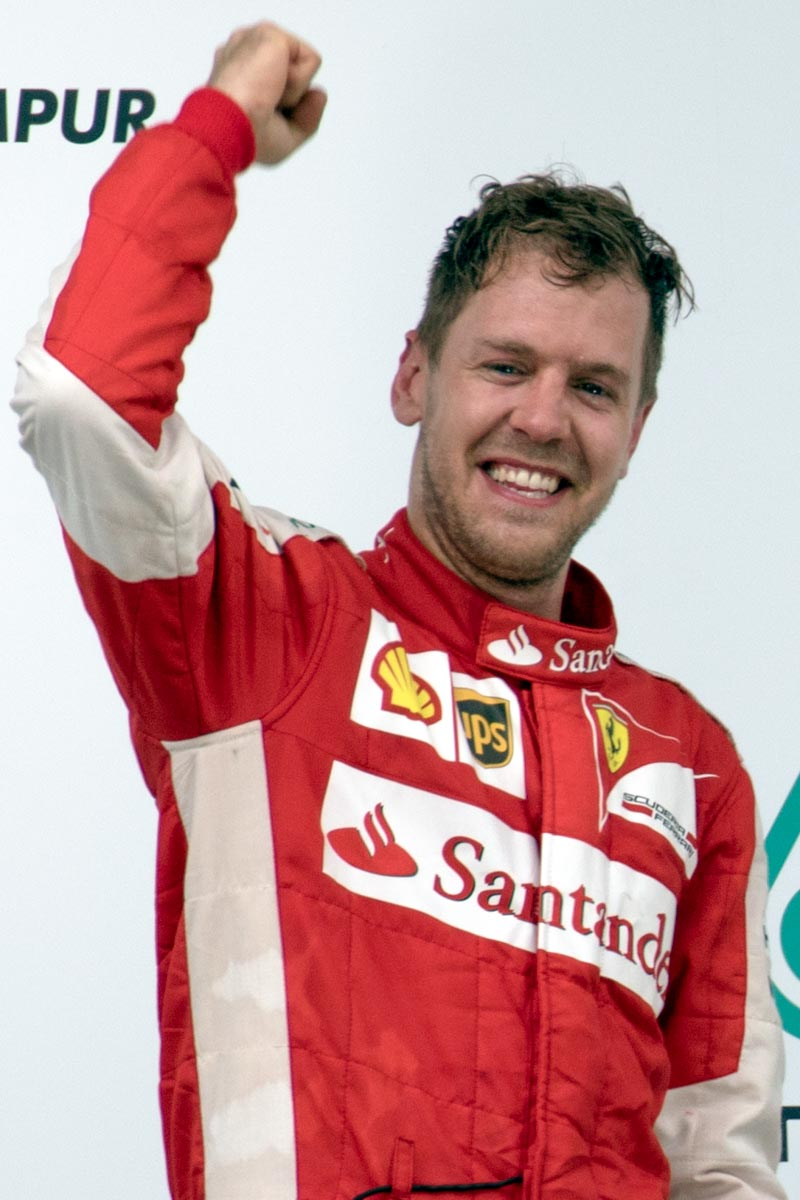
In Malaysia, Sebastian Vettel secured Ferrari's first victory since the 2013 Spanish Grand Prix and his first victory since the 2013 Brazilian Grand Prix.

==== Opening rounds ====
Mercedes began the season with a one–two finish in Australia, resulting in a twenty-eight-point lead after just one round. They finished over thirty seconds clear of Sebastian Vettel, who finished third and secured a podium finish in his first race with Ferrari. Red Bull's Daniel Ricciardo finished a lap down in sixth, prompting the team to continue to voice their frustrations with Renault, as they were forced to use its second of four allotted power units for Ricciardo on the very first day of the season. The team also voiced its displeasure over the progress Renault had made in terms of power, with the team principal, Christian Horner, saying the Renault Energy F1-2015 was still 100 horsepower (75 kW) down on Mercedes's PU106B Hybrid. After the race, the Red Bull team advisor Helmut Marko suggested that Red Bull might exit Formula One entirely if changes to the regulations were not made to level the field or cut development costs. Renault countered with their own threat to pull out of Formula One as an engine supplier if its reputation continued to be damaged or if its participation was otherwise not profitable to the company. Mercedes followed up by finishing second and third in Malaysia, while Red Bull continued to struggle, rounding out the top ten a lap down. After four rounds, Mercedes led the field, having earned 159 points (with Lewis Hamilton acquiring 93 out of 100 possible points), while Red Bull's struggles continued. The team acquired twenty-six points, enough for a distant fourth, and Ricciardo entered the European stages of the season on his fourth and final permissible power unit with fifteen events remaining on the calendar.

With McLaren's longest continuous testing session lasting twelve laps in Montmeló – a total of 56 kilometres (35 mi), a sixth of a total Grand Prix distance – before running into engine trouble, Honda elected to detune the power units for the opening Grands Prix in an effort to improve reliability and longevity while the manufacturer worked to improve these areas before homologation. After both cars qualified on the back row, Kevin Magnussen failed to reach the grid after suffering an abrupt engine failure while on his way from the pit lane to the grid. Jenson Button managed to finish the race, albeit in the last classified position, two laps behind the leaders. Magnussen relinquished his seat back to Alonso in Malaysia; both cars qualified ahead of only the Manor Marussia cars and eventually retired. The team showed signs of improvement in terms of performance and was able to compete with the midfield cars in China and Bahrain, although reliability continued to prove troublesome as Button's car was unable to compete in the latter Grand Prix.

Following a tumultuous pre-season in which they went through a period of administration and were saved by late investment, Manor Marussia arrived in Melbourne with a car that had passed its mandatory crash tests but had completed no testing. After the team's arrival in Australia, while assembling the cars, it was discovered that their computers had been wiped completely clean of all data in preparation for auction, and they ultimately could not compete in the Grand Prix. The team managed to get their cars running and on the racetrack by the second round in Malaysia, and were able to set times within 107% of the leading times in practice, giving stewards reasonable grounds to allow the team to race when they failed to do so in qualifying. Merhi was able to finish the race three laps down in fifteenth, while Stevens did not start. Manor Marussia continued to show signs of consistency, with both cars qualifying within 107%, starting, and finishing both Grands Prix in China and Bahrain. They were one of two teams, the other being McLaren, to return to Europe without a championship point.

Ferrari came into the season seemingly much more competitive than the previous season, finishing on the podium in the opening race. Kimi Räikkönen said the SF15-T was "much better" to drive than 2014's F14 T. In Malaysia, Vettel won comfortably and Räikkönen finished in fourth, despite suffering a tyre failure. The team then finished third and fourth in China and Räikkönen secured his first podium appearance since rejoining Ferrari the previous season with a second-place finish in Bahrain. With 107 points, the team returned to Europe 52 points behind Mercedes, and 46 points ahead of Williams, who were third. Sauber left the opening rounds with their first points since 2013.

==== European and Canadian rounds ====
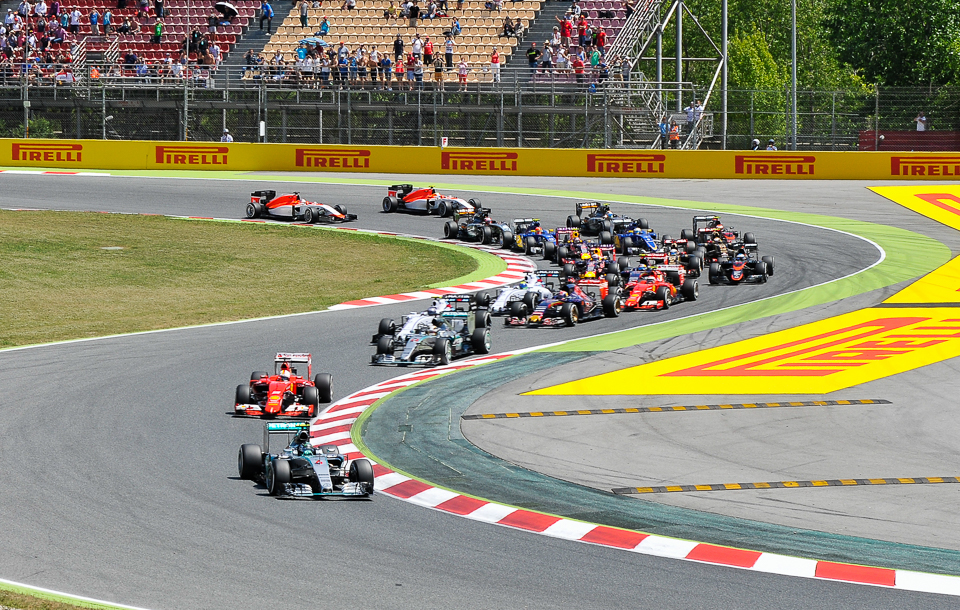
Nico Rosberg leads the field on the opening lap of the Spanish Grand Prix. He would go on to win the race.

Mercedes arrived at Spain already with a comfortable lead. Lewis Hamilton had scored ninety-three points out of a possible one hundred, giving him a twenty-seven-point lead over his teammate Nico Rosberg entering the eight-race European portion of the season.

Rosberg quickly cut into Hamilton's championship lead by securing victories in Spain (reducing his deficit to twenty points) and Monaco. The latter win was aided by the result of a costly miscalculation by the Mercedes team to pit Hamilton with a 19-second lead during a safety car period (that briefly saw the use of the "Virtual Safety Car" for the first time in F1's history) with 14 laps remaining. Rosberg and Sebastian Vettel did not make pit stops, allowing both to narrowly pass Hamilton by the pit lane exit. Racing resumed on lap seventy-one and Rosberg quickly pulled away, remaining in the lead until the chequered flag. Vettel held off Hamilton for second and third, respectively. As a result, Hamilton's lead over Rosberg in the Drivers' Championship was cut in half, to just ten points. Meanwhile, Button secured McLaren's first points of the season by finishing eighth. This left the Marussia drivers of Stevens and Merhi, along with the other McLaren driver, Fernando Alonso, as the only full-time drivers not to score a point after seven rounds.

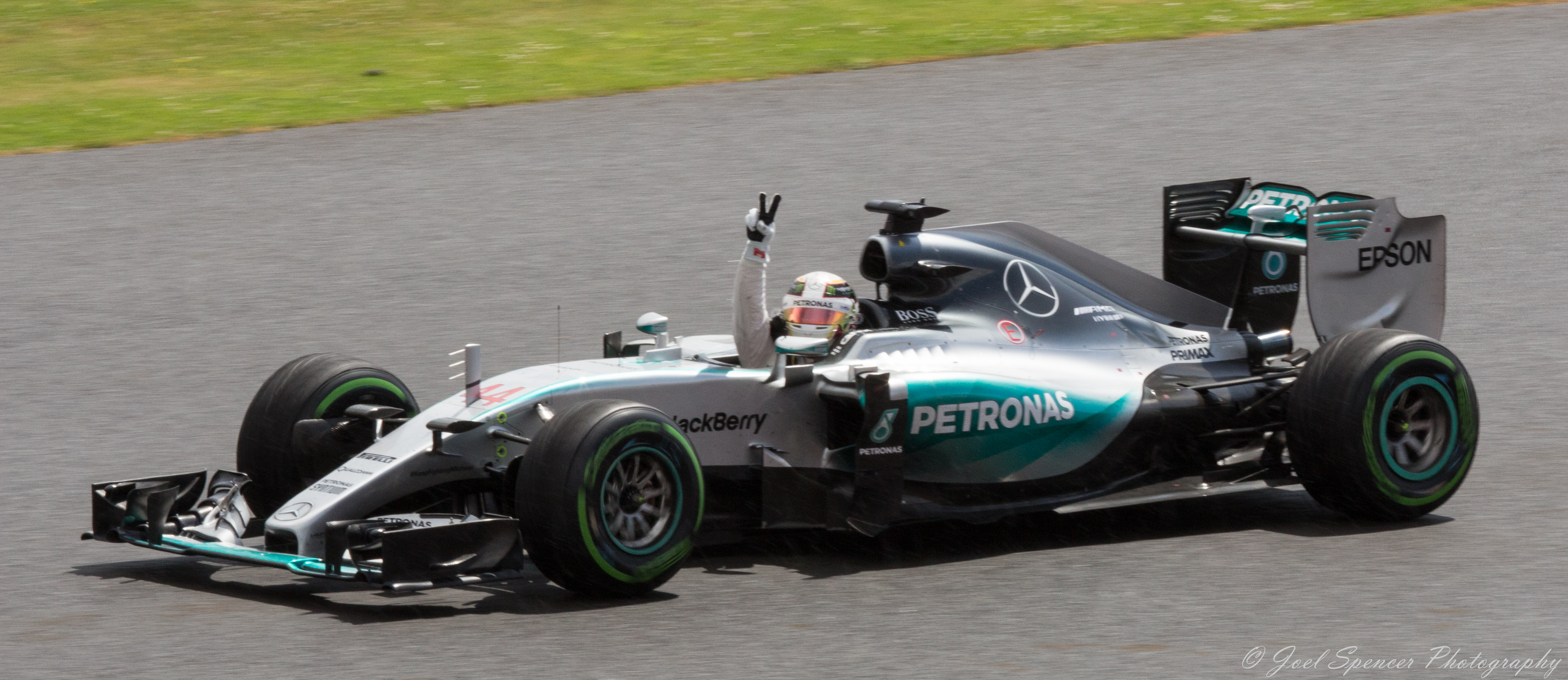

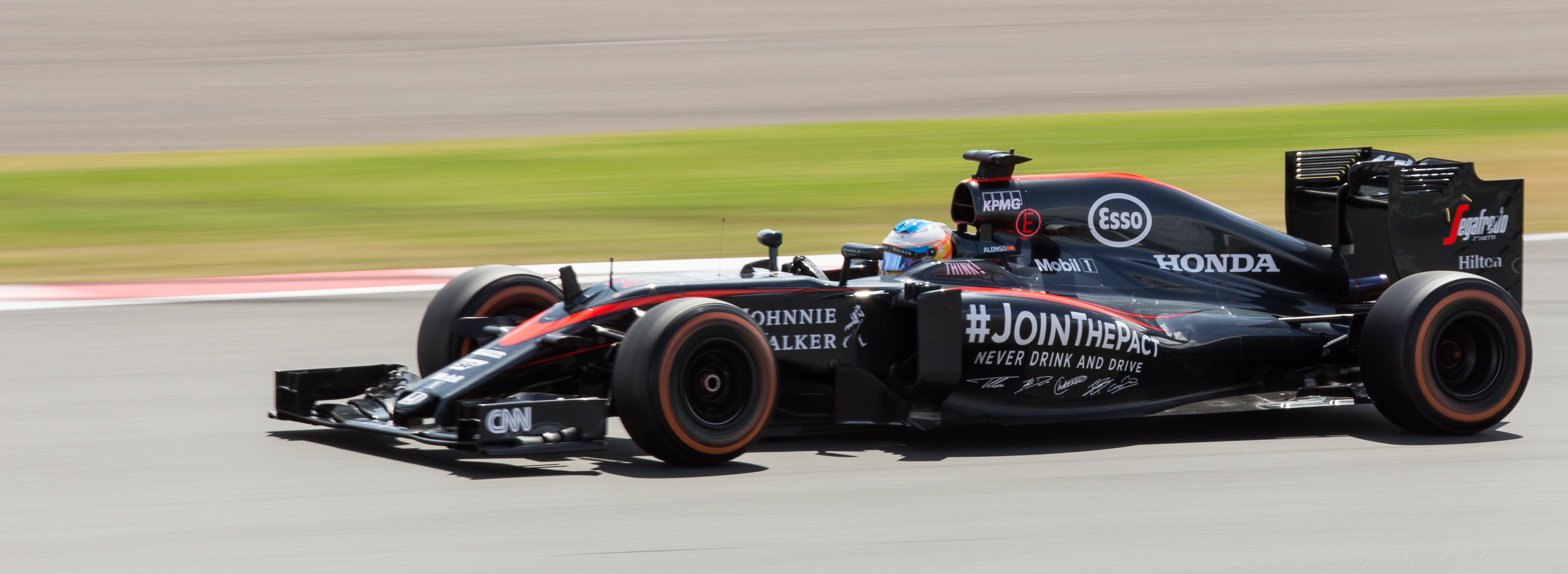
Lewis Hamilton (top) gestures to his home crowd following his fifth win of the season at Silverstone, while Fernando Alonso (bottom) picked up his first point of the season.

At the following Grands Prix in Canada, Austria, and Britain, Mercedes put to rest the criticism following the result in Monaco through finishing first and second in the next three races, extending their championship lead to 160 points over Ferrari. Williams collected their first two podiums of the season in the form of third-place results by Valtteri Bottas in Canada and Felipe Massa in Austria, while Ferrari lost ground to Mercedes following a retirement in Austria and an eighth-place finish in Britain by Räikkönen. Other power unit manufacturers continued to struggle, with a Renault-powered car finishing in the top five only once, in Monaco, indicating their continued lack of power. Honda continued to have reliability issues and, up to the British Grand Prix, suffered nine retirements and two failures to start due to power unit problems, translating to only seven overall finishes out of 18 possible results.

The Drivers' Championship remained closely contested between leader Lewis Hamilton and Nico Rosberg, with the gap between them never larger than twenty-eight points after Hamilton's victory in round eleven in Belgium. The two would trade victories between rounds six and nine, closing the gap to as little as ten points. Sebastian Vettel, who at one time was within three points of the lead, after his victory in Malaysia, and who was the only non-Mercedes winner after eleven rounds, could not overcome team errors in Canada and Austria, and fell fifty-nine points off the pace of Hamilton after round nine. He rebounded in Hungary by winning his second race of the season, reducing the gap to Hamilton to forty-two points in the process, but fell out of a point-scoring position in Belgium after a tyre failure on the penultimate lap, dropping him to sixty-seven points behind the leader.

Hamilton closed out the European portion of the season with his seventh victory of the season in Italy. With Rosberg's retirement at the event, Hamilton entered the closing rounds of the season with a lead of fifty-three points over his teammate in the Drivers' Championship standings, the largest gap of the season at that point, while Vettel sat a further twenty-one points behind. Hamilton's tenth pole position in Belgium assured him of victory in the FIA Pole Trophy, the award for the driver who achieves the most pole positions during the season. Mercedes had built up a 181-point lead over Ferrari in the Constructors' Championship, with Williams in third, 263 points behind the leaders. After twelve rounds, half of the teams had been represented on the podium, while nine out of ten had scored points.

==== Asian, Russian, and American rounds ====
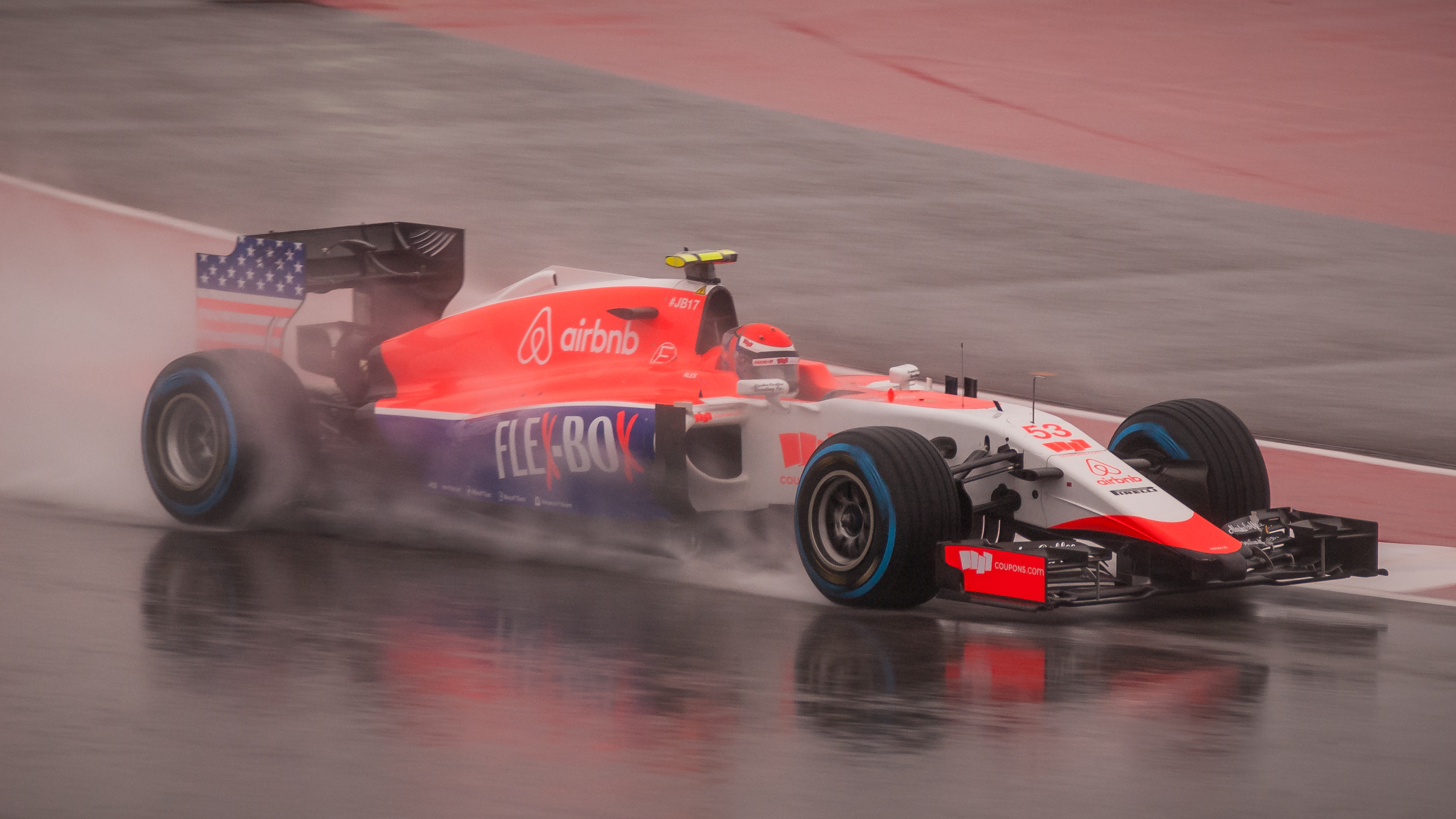
American Alexander Rossi, seen here driving at his home race, made his Formula One race debut at the Singapore Grand Prix.

Shortly before the thirteenth round in Singapore, Manor Marussia announced that the American GP2 driver Alexander Rossi would race for the team, replacing Merhi in five of the final seven rounds, while Merhi was retained for the remaining two. Vettel won his third victory of the season in Singapore, closing his gap to Nico Rosberg in second place to just eight points.

Rosberg could not close the gap to Hamilton in Japan or Russia; despite winning pole position in both races, his leads were short-lived. He was passed by Hamilton on the opening corner in Japan and retired on lap seven in Russia. Vettel capitalised on the results with third and second-place finishes respectively, to take second place in the Drivers' Championship from Rosberg with four rounds remaining, while Hamilton extended his lead to sixty-six points, the highest lead he had held in the season. A victory in the United States, with Rosberg and Vettel finishing second and third respectively, secured the third Drivers' Championship for Hamilton with three races left to run. Rosberg won the final three races in Mexico, Brazil, and Abu Dhabi to reclaim second in the Drivers' Championship from Vettel, while Hamilton secured the Fastest Lap Award in Brazil.

=== Awards ===
Lewis Hamilton ended the season winning not only the championship, but also the FIA Pole Trophy for most pole positions of the season and the DHL Fastest Lap Award. Ferrari won the inaugural DHL Pit Stop Award, posting the fastest pit stop time at seven of the first eighteen races of the season. Both Hamilton and Mercedes collected their championship trophies at a gala held in Paris on 4 December 2015. Toro Rosso's Max Verstappen collected three post-season awards for Rookie of the Year, Personality of the Year and Action of the Year (for his overtake on Felipe Nasr through Blanchimont corner at the Belgian Grand Prix).

=== Legal disputes ===
==== Sauber ====
Sauber's early season preparations were disrupted by a series of legal challenges from the former Caterham driver Giedo van der Garde, who claimed the team had reneged on a contract that was signed in June 2014. Van der Garde filed a motion with the Supreme Court of Victoria in Australia in an effort to force the team to replace one of their drivers with him at the opening round in Melbourne, with the court finding in his favour. Van der Garde later agreed not to participate in the event, with the driver and team settling the dispute for an undisclosed sum and terminating the contract following the first round.

==== Lotus ====
Lotus suffered financially throughout the season, culminating in Pirelli withholding their tyres for the Friday practice sessions in Hungary. Before the Belgian Grand Prix, amid negotiations with Renault for a potential takeover, the former Lotus reserve driver Charles Pic initiated legal action against Lotus alleging lack of seat time in 2014, resulting in breach of contract. Belgian authorities later moved to impound the assets of Lotus for four days following Grosjean's podium finish. After talks between the FIA and Lotus, the team was allowed to leave Spa with their equipment and cars, and was able to start the following race in Italy.

== Results and standings ==
=== Grands Prix ===
Round	Grand Prix	Pole position	Fastest lap	Winning driver	Winning constructor	Report
1	(Australia) Australian Grand Prix	(United Kingdom) Lewis Hamilton	(United Kingdom) Lewis Hamilton	(United Kingdom) Lewis Hamilton	(Germany) Mercedes	Report
2	(Malaysia) Malaysian Grand Prix	(United Kingdom) Lewis Hamilton	(Germany) Nico Rosberg	(Germany) Sebastian Vettel	(Italy) Ferrari	Report
3	(China) Chinese Grand Prix	(United Kingdom) Lewis Hamilton	(United Kingdom) Lewis Hamilton	(United Kingdom) Lewis Hamilton	(Germany) Mercedes	Report
4	Bahrain Grand Prix	(United Kingdom) Lewis Hamilton	(Finland) Kimi Räikkönen	(United Kingdom) Lewis Hamilton	(Germany) Mercedes	Report
5	(Spain) Spanish Grand Prix	(Germany) Nico Rosberg	(United Kingdom) Lewis Hamilton	(Germany) Nico Rosberg	(Germany) Mercedes	Report
6	Monaco Grand Prix	(United Kingdom) Lewis Hamilton	(Australia) Daniel Ricciardo	(Germany) Nico Rosberg	(Germany) Mercedes	Report
7	(Canada) Canadian Grand Prix	(United Kingdom) Lewis Hamilton	(Finland) Kimi Räikkönen	(United Kingdom) Lewis Hamilton	(Germany) Mercedes	Report
8	(Austria) Austrian Grand Prix	(United Kingdom) Lewis Hamilton	(Germany) Nico Rosberg	(Germany) Nico Rosberg	(Germany) Mercedes	Report
9	(United Kingdom) British Grand Prix	(United Kingdom) Lewis Hamilton	(United Kingdom) Lewis Hamilton	(United Kingdom) Lewis Hamilton	(Germany) Mercedes	Report
10	(Hungary) Hungarian Grand Prix	(United Kingdom) Lewis Hamilton	(Australia) Daniel Ricciardo	(Germany) Sebastian Vettel	(Italy) Ferrari	Report
11	(Belgium) Belgian Grand Prix	(United Kingdom) Lewis Hamilton	(Germany) Nico Rosberg	(United Kingdom) Lewis Hamilton	(Germany) Mercedes	Report
12	(Italy) Italian Grand Prix	(United Kingdom) Lewis Hamilton	(United Kingdom) Lewis Hamilton	(United Kingdom) Lewis Hamilton	(Germany) Mercedes	Report
13	Singapore Grand Prix	(Germany) Sebastian Vettel	(Australia) Daniel Ricciardo	(Germany) Sebastian Vettel	(Italy) Ferrari	Report
14	(Japan) Japanese Grand Prix	(Germany) Nico Rosberg	(United Kingdom) Lewis Hamilton	(United Kingdom) Lewis Hamilton	(Germany) Mercedes	Report
15	(Russia) Russian Grand Prix	(Germany) Nico Rosberg	(Germany) Sebastian Vettel	(United Kingdom) Lewis Hamilton	(Germany) Mercedes	Report
16	United States Grand Prix	(Germany) Nico Rosberg	(Germany) Nico Rosberg	(United Kingdom) Lewis Hamilton	(Germany) Mercedes	Report
17	(Mexico) Mexican Grand Prix	(Germany) Nico Rosberg	(Germany) Nico Rosberg	(Germany) Nico Rosberg	(Germany) Mercedes	Report
18	(Brazil) Brazilian Grand Prix	(Germany) Nico Rosberg	(United Kingdom) Lewis Hamilton	(Germany) Nico Rosberg	(Germany) Mercedes	Report
19	(United Arab Emirates) Abu Dhabi Grand Prix	(Germany) Nico Rosberg	(United Kingdom) Lewis Hamilton	(Germany) Nico Rosberg	(Germany) Mercedes	Report

=== Scoring system ===
Points were awarded to the top ten classified finishers in every race, using the following structure:

Position	1st	2nd	3rd	4th	5th	6th	7th	8th	9th	10th
Points	25	18	15	12	10	8	6	4	2	1

In the event of a tie, a count-back system was used as a tie-breaker, with a driver's best result used to decide the standings. (Note: In the event that two or more drivers or constructors achieved the same best result an equal number of times, their next-best result was used, and so on. If two or more drivers or constructors achieved equal results an equal number of times, the FIA would have nominated the winner according to such criteria as it thought fit.)

=== World Drivers' Championship standings ===
Pos.	Driver	AUS (Australia)	MAL (Malaysia)	CHN (China)	BHR (Bahrain)	ESP (Spain)	MON (Monaco)	CAN (Canada)	AUT (Austria)	GBR (United Kingdom)	HUN (Hungary)	BEL (Belgium)	ITA (Italy)	SIN (Singapore)	JPN (Japan)	RUS (Russia)	USA (United States)	MEX (Mexico)	BRA (Brazil)	ABU (United Arab Emirates)	Points
1	(United Kingdom) Lewis Hamilton	1^{P}^{F}	2^{P}	1^{P}^{F}	1^{P}	2^{F}	3^{P}	1^{P}	2^{P}	1^{P}^{F}	6^{P}	1^{P}	1^{P}^{F}	Ret	1^{F}	1	1	2	2^{F}	2^{F}	381
2	(Germany) Nico Rosberg	2	3^{F}	2	3	1^{P}	1	2	1^{F}	2	8	2^{F}	17^{†}	4	2^{P}	Ret^{P}	2^{P}^{F}	1^{P}^{F}	1^{P}	1^{P}	322
3	(Germany) Sebastian Vettel	3	1	3	5	3	2	5	4	3	1	12^{†}	2	1^{P}	3	2^{F}	3	Ret	3	4	278
4	(Finland) Kimi Räikkönen	Ret	4	4	2^{F}	5	6	4^{F}	Ret	8	Ret	7	5	3	4	8	Ret	Ret	4	3	150
5	(Finland) Valtteri Bottas	DNS	5	6	4	4	14	3	5	5	13	9	4	5	5	12^{†}	Ret	3	5	13	136
6	(Brazil) Felipe Massa	4	6	5	10	6	15	6	3	4	12	6	3	Ret	17	4	Ret	6	DSQ	8	121
7	(Russia) Daniil Kvyat	DNS	9	Ret	9	10	4	9	12	6	2	4	10	6	13	5	Ret	4	7	10	95
8	(Australia) Daniel Ricciardo	6	10	9	6	7	5^{F}	13	10	Ret	3^{F}	Ret	8	2^{F}	15	15^{†}	10	5	11	6	92
9	(Mexico) Sergio Pérez	10	13	11	8	13	7	11	9	9	Ret	5	6	7	12	3	5	8	12	5	78
10	(Germany) Nico Hülkenberg	7	14	Ret	13	15	11	8	6	7	Ret	DNS	7	Ret	6	Ret	Ret	7	6	7	58
11	(France) Romain Grosjean	Ret	11	7	7	8	12	10	Ret	Ret	7	3	Ret	13^{†}	7	Ret	Ret	10	8	9	51
12	(Netherlands) Max Verstappen	Ret	7	17^{†}	Ret	11	Ret	15	8	Ret	4	8	12	8	9	10	4	9	9	16	49
13	(Brazil) Felipe Nasr	5	12	8	12	12	9	16	11	DNS	11	11	13	10	20^{†}	6	9	Ret	13	15	27
14	(Venezuela) Pastor Maldonado	Ret	Ret	Ret	15	Ret	Ret	7	7	Ret	14	Ret	Ret	12	8	7	8	11	10	Ret	27
15	(Spain) Carlos Sainz Jr.	9	8	13	Ret	9	10	12	Ret	Ret	Ret	Ret	11	9	10	Ret	7	13	Ret	11	18
16	(United Kingdom) Jenson Button	11	Ret	14	DNS	16	8	Ret	Ret	Ret	9	14	14	Ret	16	9	6	14	14	12	16
17	(Spain) Fernando Alonso		Ret	12	11	Ret	Ret	Ret	Ret	10	5	13	18^{†}	Ret	11	11	11	Ret	15	17	11
18	(Sweden) Marcus Ericsson	8	Ret	10	14	14	13	14	13	11	10	10	9	11	14	Ret	Ret	12	16	14	9
19	(Spain) Roberto Merhi	DNP	15	16	17	18	16	Ret	14	12	15	15	16			13				19	0
20	(United States) Alexander Rossi													14	18		12	15	18		0
21	(United Kingdom) Will Stevens	DNP	DNS	15	16	17	17	17	Ret	13	16^{†}	16	15	15	19	14	Ret	16	17	18	0
—	(Denmark) Kevin Magnussen	DNS																			0
Pos.	Driver	AUS (Australia)	MAL (Malaysia)	CHN (China)	BHR (Bahrain)	ESP (Spain)	MON (Monaco)	CAN (Canada)	AUT (Austria)	GBR (United Kingdom)	HUN (Hungary)	BEL (Belgium)	ITA (Italy)	SIN (Singapore)	JPN (Japan)	RUS (Russia)	USA (United States)	MEX (Mexico)	BRA (Brazil)	ABU (United Arab Emirates)	Points

Key
Colour	Result
Gold	Winner
Silver	Second place
Bronze	Third place
Green	Other points position
Blue	Other classified position
Blue	Not classified, finished (NC)
Purple	Not classified, retired (Ret)
Red	Did not qualify (DNQ)
Black	Disqualified (DSQ)
White	Did not start (DNS)
White	Race cancelled (C)
Blank	Did not practice (DNP)
Blank	Excluded (EX)
Blank	Did not arrive (DNA)
Blank	Withdrawn (WD)
Blank	Did not enter (empty cell)
Annotation	Meaning
P	Pole position
F	Fastest lap

Notes:

- ^{†} – Driver did not finish the Grand Prix, but was classified as they completed more than 90% of the race distance.

=== World Constructors' Championship standings ===
Constructors' Championship points were awarded as per the Drivers' Championship with the results of both cars taken into account. In the event of a tie, a count-back system was used as a tie-breaker, with a constructor's best result used to decide the standings.

Pos.	Constructor	AUS (Australia)	MAL (Malaysia)	CHN (China)	BHR (Bahrain)	ESP (Spain)	MON (Monaco)	CAN (Canada)	AUT (Austria)	GBR (United Kingdom)	HUN (Hungary)	BEL (Belgium)	ITA (Italy)	SIN (Singapore)	JPN (Japan)	RUS (Russia)	USA (United States)	MEX (Mexico)	BRA (Brazil)	ABU (United Arab Emirates)	Points
1	(Germany) Mercedes	1^{P}^{F}	2^{P}	1^{P}^{F}	1^{P}	1^{P}	1	1^{P}	1^{F}	1^{P}^{F}	6^{P}	1^{P}	1^{P}^{F}	4	1^{F}	1	1	1^{P}^{F}	1^{P}	1^{P}	703
1	(Germany) Mercedes	2	3^{F}	2	3	2^{F}	3^{P}	2	2^{P}	2	8	2^{F}	17^{†}	Ret	2^{P}	Ret^{P}	2^{P}^{F}	2	2^{F}	2^{F}	703
2	(Italy) Ferrari	3	1	3	2^{F}	3	2	4^{F}	4	3	1	7	2	1^{P}	3	2^{F}	3	Ret	3	3	428
2	(Italy) Ferrari	Ret	4	4	5	5	6	5	Ret	8	Ret	12^{†}	5	3	4	8	Ret	Ret	4	4	428
3	(United Kingdom) Williams-Mercedes	4	5	5	4	4	14	3	3	4	12	6	3	5	5	4	Ret	3	5	8	257
3	(United Kingdom) Williams-Mercedes	DNS	6	6	10	6	15	6	5	5	13	9	4	Ret	17	12^{†}	Ret	6	DSQ	13	257
4	(Austria) Red Bull-Renault	6	9	9	6	7	4	9	10	6	2	4	8	2^{F}	13	5	10	4	7	6	187
4	(Austria) Red Bull-Renault	DNS	10	Ret	9	10	5^{F}	13	12	Ret	3^{F}	Ret	10	6	15	15^{†}	Ret	5	11	10	187
5	Force India-Mercedes	7	13	11	8	13	7	8	6	7	Ret	5	6	7	6	3	5	7	6	5	136
5	Force India-Mercedes	10	14	Ret	13	15	11	11	9	9	Ret	DNS	7	Ret	12	Ret	Ret	8	12	7	136
6	(United Kingdom) Lotus-Mercedes	Ret	11	7	7	8	12	7	7	Ret	7	3	Ret	12	7	7	8	10	8	9	78
6	(United Kingdom) Lotus-Mercedes	Ret	Ret	Ret	15	Ret	Ret	10	Ret	Ret	14	Ret	Ret	13^{†}	8	Ret	Ret	11	10	Ret	78
7	(Italy) Toro Rosso-Renault	9	7	13	Ret	9	10	12	8	Ret	4	8	11	8	9	10	4	9	9	11	67
7	(Italy) Toro Rosso-Renault	Ret	8	17^{†}	Ret	11	Ret	15	Ret	Ret	Ret	Ret	12	9	10	Ret	7	13	Ret	16	67
8	(Switzerland) Sauber-Ferrari	5	12	8	12	12	9	14	11	11	10	10	9	10	14	6	9	12	13	14	36
8	(Switzerland) Sauber-Ferrari	8	Ret	10	14	14	13	16	13	DNS	11	11	13	11	20^{†}	Ret	Ret	Ret	16	15	36
9	(United Kingdom) McLaren-Honda	11	Ret	12	11	16	8	Ret	Ret	10	5	13	14	Ret	11	9	6	14	14	12	27
9	(United Kingdom) McLaren-Honda	DNS	Ret	14	DNS	Ret	Ret	Ret	Ret	Ret	9	14	18^{†}	Ret	16	11	11	Ret	15	17	27
10	(United Kingdom) Marussia-Ferrari	DNP	15	15	16	17	16	17	14	12	15	15	15	14	18	13	12	15	17	18	0
10	(United Kingdom) Marussia-Ferrari	DNP	DNS	16	17	18	17	Ret	Ret	13	16^{†}	16	16	15	19	14	Ret	16	18	19	0
Pos.	Constructor	AUS (Australia)	MAL (Malaysia)	CHN (China)	BHR (Bahrain)	ESP (Spain)	MON (Monaco)	CAN (Canada)	AUT (Austria)	GBR (United Kingdom)	HUN (Hungary)	BEL (Belgium)	ITA (Italy)	SIN (Singapore)	JPN (Japan)	RUS (Russia)	USA (United States)	MEX (Mexico)	BRA (Brazil)	ABU (United Arab Emirates)	Points

Key
Colour	Result
Gold	Winner
Silver	Second place
Bronze	Third place
Green	Other points position
Blue	Other classified position
Blue	Not classified, finished (NC)
Purple	Not classified, retired (Ret)
Red	Did not qualify (DNQ)
Black	Disqualified (DSQ)
White	Did not start (DNS)
White	Race cancelled (C)
Blank	Did not practice (DNP)
Blank	Excluded (EX)
Blank	Did not arrive (DNA)
Blank	Withdrawn (WD)
Blank	Did not enter (empty cell)
Annotation	Meaning
P	Pole position
F	Fastest lap

Notes:

- ^{†} – Drivers did not finish the Grand Prix, but were classified as they completed more than 90% of the race distance.
- The standings are sorted by best result, rows are not related to the drivers.

== See also ==
- 2015 Formula One pre-season testing
