= 2015 Bahrain Grand Prix =

4th round of the 2015 Formula One season

Race 4 of 19 in the 2015 Formula One World Championship
← Previous race	Next race →

Race details
- Date: 19 April 2015
- Official name: 2015 Formula 1 Gulf Air Bahrain Grand Prix
- Location: Bahrain International Circuit; Sakhir, Bahrain
- Course: Permanent Racing Facility
- Course length: 5.412 km (3.363 miles)
- Distance: 57 laps, 308.238 km (191.530 miles)
- Weather: Sunny, clear 24–26 °C (75–79 °F) air temperature 28–31 °C (82–88 °F) track temperature 1.5 m/s (4.9 ft/s) wind from the north
- Attendance: 90,000 (Weekend) 32,000 (Race Day)

Pole position
Driver	(United Kingdom) Lewis Hamilton	Mercedes
- Time: 1:32.571

Fastest lap
Driver	(Finland) Kimi Räikkönen	Ferrari
- Time: 1:36.311 on lap 42

Podium
First	(United Kingdom) Lewis Hamilton	Mercedes
Second	(Finland) Kimi Räikkönen	Ferrari
Third	(Germany) Nico Rosberg	Mercedes

The 2015 Bahrain Grand Prix (formally known as the 2015 Formula 1 Gulf Air Bahrain Grand Prix) was a Formula One motor race that was held on 19 April 2015 at the Bahrain International Circuit in Sakhir, Bahrain. The race was the fourth round of the 2015 Formula One World Championship and marked the eleventh time that the Bahrain Grand Prix has been run as a round of the Formula One World Championship.

Lewis Hamilton, who was the defending race winner, came into the race with a 13-point lead over Sebastian Vettel in the World Drivers' Championship after his victory a week prior in China. He took the 42nd pole position of his career during Saturday's qualifying, and his fourth in a row. In the race, Hamilton won from Kimi Räikkönen and Nico Rosberg, taking his 36th race victory.

== Report ==
=== Background ===
There were tensions in the Mercedes team prior to the Grand Prix. After the Chinese Grand Prix the week before, Nico Rosberg had accused his teammate Lewis Hamilton of deliberately backing him into the charging Ferrari cars during the race, claiming he had "compromised" his race. Hamilton in turn claimed that Rosberg was never close enough to attack him, an assertion that Rosberg rejected, saying he "did try to attack". The team reacted by issuing a warning to their drivers, that they would start "managing" them more if they should not be able to race for the best of the team on track. After comments made by Hamilton saying that his contract extension negotiations were going slow, rumours arose that Hamilton had asked for a clear number one status in the team, a claim denied by both driver and team.

==== Political protests ====
As with previous years there were protests against the race going forward. The protests highlighted the situation of the Shi'ite majority in the Sunni-ruled Arab country, demanding the release of political prisoners. The protesters tried to use the arrival of Formula One to bring their demands into the public eye. The race came only one week after a report was published by Amnesty International about "unabated" human rights violations in Bahrain. In previous years, Formula One commercial rights executive Bernie Ecclestone had maintained the view that the political situation should be kept separate from the sport, saying in 2013: "We're not here, or we don't go anywhere, to judge how a country is run". However, in what was viewed as a "180-degree policy reversal", Formula One issued a statement ahead of the 2015 Grand Prix, stating that it "has committed itself to respecting human rights in Bahrain and other countries in which it conducts business".

==== Weather ====
The weather for the Bahrain Grand Prix was "typically hot [and] dry", with temperatures on Friday around 36 °C (97 °F) as the first practice session began. However, lower temperatures were expected for race day, when the race was held at night.

==== Tyres ====
As in 2014, Pirelli announced they would be supplying teams with the white-banded medium compound tyre as the prime selection and the yellow-banded soft compound as the option selection for the event.

=== Free practice ===
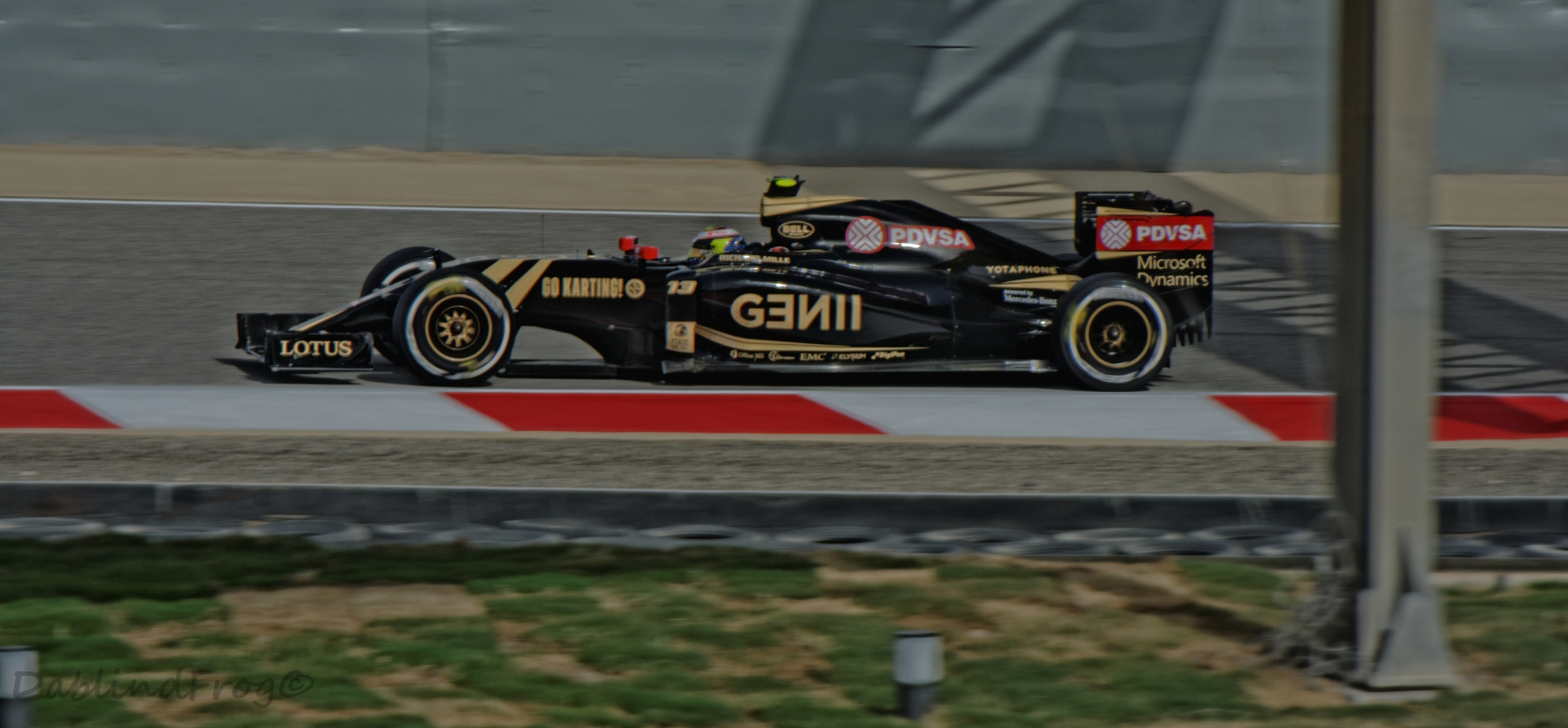
Pastor Maldonado during Friday's second free practice session

Per the regulations for the 2015 season, three practice sessions were held, two 1.5-hour sessions on Friday and another one-hour session before qualifying on Saturday. Kimi Räikkönen and Sebastian Vettel of Ferrari were quickest in the first free practice session on Friday afternoon, with Räikkönen the only driver to lap the course in less than 1:38. The Mercedes team focused on long runs, running their cars on high fuel loads to examine tyre wear and were therefore down in 15th and 16th places respectively. Vettel's Ferrari showed problems early in the session, but Vettel was able to run without issues towards the end. Jenson Button spun out in turn one on the start of his first flying lap and was unable to run again as his team tried to change his car's battery. It was however an uplifting session for McLaren nonetheless, since Button's teammate Fernando Alonso finished in seventh place, just seven-tenths away from Räikkönen's fastest time. After China the week before, Jolyon Palmer once again took part in the first practice session for Lotus.

Mercedes hit back in the second session on Friday night, with Nico Rosberg leading his teammate Lewis Hamilton by about a tenth of a second. The Ferraris were about half a second behind, with Räikkönen again the faster of the two. It was another dismal session for Jenson Button who had to park his car halfway through the session, though he was able to come back for a couple of laps towards the end of the session. A late red flag came out when Vettel, braking slowly into turn one, was clipped by the Force India of Sergio Pérez, taking off part of his front wing endplate.

Lewis Hamilton topped the time sheets in Saturday's free practice session, with Sebastian Vettel a tenth of a second behind, while Rosberg and Räikkönen completed the top four. Few cars took to the track during the early part of the session due to high temperatures and strong winds. A brief red flag period occurred midway through practice when Daniil Kvyat spun out in turn four.

=== Qualifying ===
Qualifying consisted of three parts, 18, 15 and 12 minutes in length respectively, with five drivers eliminated from competing after each of the first two sessions. All teams, including Mercedes used the softer tyre compound during the first session (Q1). Jenson Button, who had problems with his car all during practice, was unable to set a time when his car broke down on his out lap. Lewis Hamilton set the fastest time, with Valtteri Bottas in second. Along with Button, both Manor Marussia cars were eliminated in Q1, as well as Daniil Kvyat – who made a mistake during his final lap – and Pastor Maldonado. Fernando Alonso was the first driver to reach a second qualifying session for McLaren over the course of the season.

Neither me nor the team expected that kind of performance. We were expecting that we could get out of Q1 but to then qualify P8 was a big surprise. [...] Definitely fighting for points, I think that is the target [for the race].

— Nico Hülkenberg, after qualifying eighth.

Hamilton once again set the time in Q2, almost a second ahead of second-placed Kimi Räikkönen, while Felipe Massa went faster than Sebastian Vettel in third. Alonso was eliminated in 14th position, ahead of Max Verstappen in the Toro Rosso, who was half a second slower than Carlos Sainz Jr., his teammate. Sergio Pérez joined the two Sauber drivers as the last three cars not to make it into the top ten.

All drivers but Daniel Ricciardo did their first run in Q3 on used tyres in order to save a set for the race, with Hamilton fastest yet again. When the cars came around for their second and final timed laps, Ricciardo crossed the line first ahead of the Ferrari drivers, with Vettel going faster than teammate Räikkönen. When the two Mercedes came across the line last, Hamilton took his fourth consecutive pole position, while Nico Rosberg had to settle for third on the grid, not being able to beat Vettel's time. The two Williams cars filled the third row, while Nico Hülkenberg was delighted with eighth on the grid.

==== Post-qualifying ====
Jenson Button was required to apply to the stewards to be allowed to race, because he did not post a lap time during the first part of qualifying. They gave him permission to start based on his satisfactory practice times.

=== Race ===
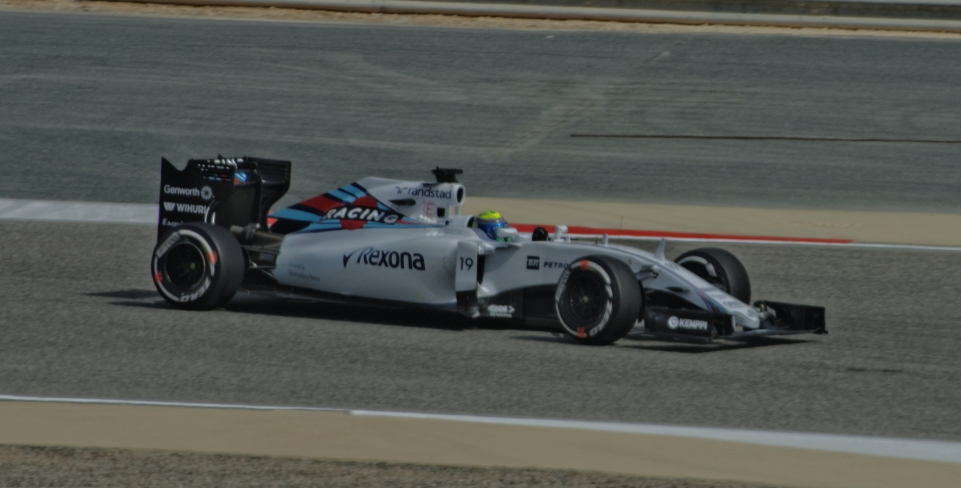
Being unable to start the formation lap, Felipe Massa had to start the race from the pit lane.

Prior to the start, McLaren confirmed that they were unable to get Jenson Button's car to the grid, as the data indicated his earlier electrical issues continued. Felipe Massa's Williams did not get off the line at the start of the formation lap, so he had to start from the pit lane. The start lights went on after a long delay, due to Pastor Maldonado being in the wrong grid position.

At the start proper, Lewis Hamilton was able to hold his lead, while his teammate Nico Rosberg tried to attack Sebastian Vettel in second place. This opened up the opportunity for the second Ferrari of Kimi Räikkönen to go around the outside of the Mercedes and take third. Hamilton tried to open up a gap in order to cover his position, should the Ferrari drivers attempt a so-called undercut, a strategy in which a car entered the pit lane early in order to use fresher tyres to get in front of another car without overtaking them on track. Meanwhile, Rosberg took back third from Räikkönen on lap four before doing the same with Vettel on the end of lap nine.

As the pit stops started on lap eleven, Massa, Nico Hülkenberg and Felipe Nasr were the first to come in for new tyres. Hamilton had extended his advantage over Vettel to almost 8 seconds when Vettel made a pit stop – the first of the front-runners to do so – on lap 14. The undercut-strategy worked, as Rosberg emerged from the pit lane behind the Ferrari when he made a pit stop one lap later. Hamilton changed tyres on the following lap, emerging close in front of the battling Rosberg and Vettel, with the Mercedes driver taking second position in a DRS-aided move on the inside of turn one. He was now close behind teammate Hamilton, but ultimately unable to attack him for the lead. Räikkönen was the last of the top four to pit, on lap 18 and applied a different strategy, as he used the harder medium tyres, while the Mercedes and Vettel were running their middle stint on the softer tyre compound. Even with the harder tyres, he was able to close to the top three.

Felipe Massa tried to make up places after his pit lane-start, but was caught in midfield battles. He went into the pit lane simultaneously with Felipe Nasr in front and Pastor Maldonado behind him. A swift stop by the Lotus pit crew meant that Maldonado was able to get out ahead and gain two positions. Sauber driver Marcus Ericsson was running eighth when he came into the pit lane on lap 26. A 27-second pit stop due to problems with the front left tyre meant that he fell out of reach for a points finish. Carlos Sainz Jr. retired from the race right after exiting pit lane on lap 30, due to an issue with his front left wheel. His Toro Rosso teammate Max Verstappen joined him on the sidelines on lap 34 due to an electrical failure.

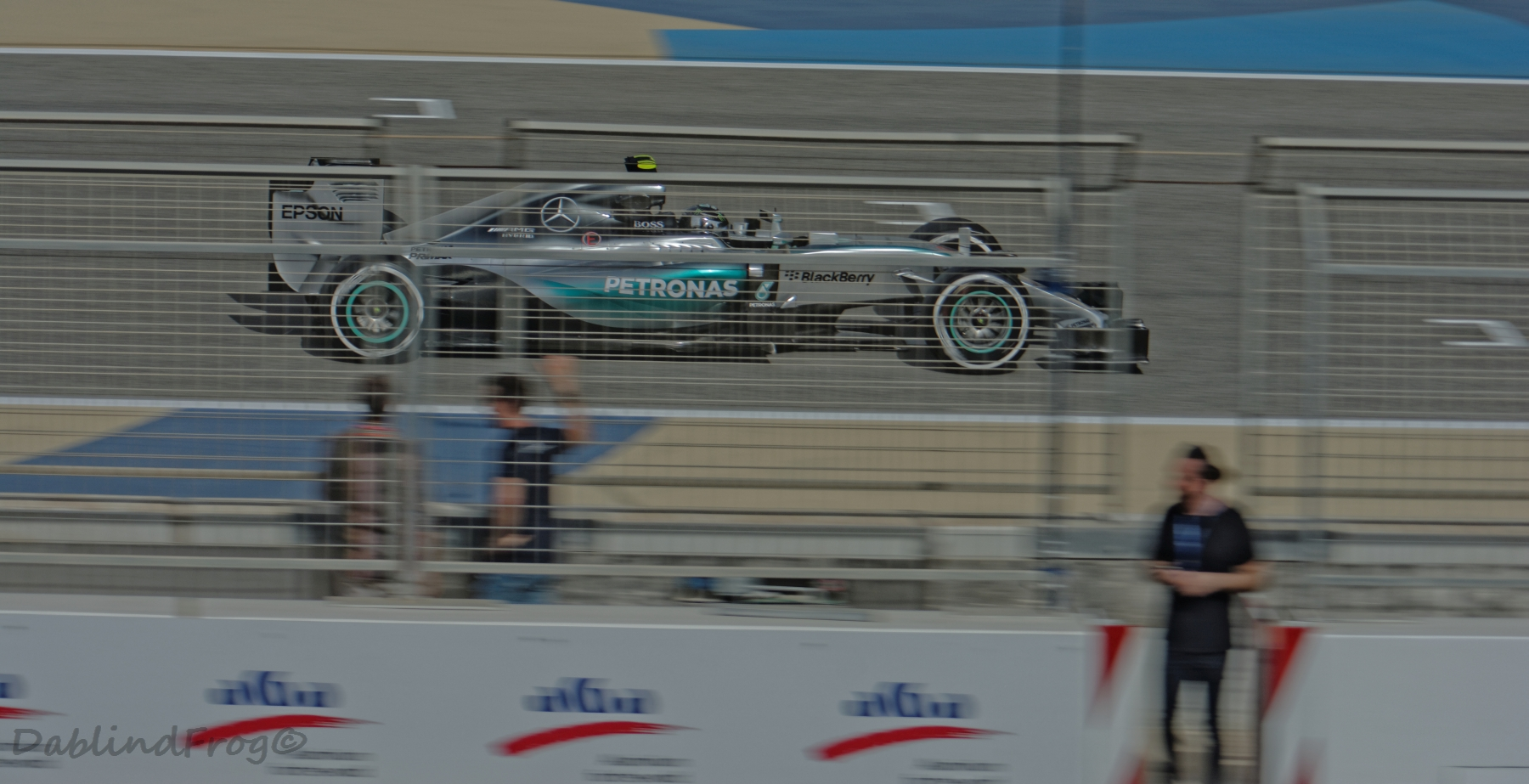
Nico Rosberg finished third for Mercedes.

On lap 34, both Hamilton and Vettel came in for their second and final planned stop, both equipping the medium tyre set. The undercut worked once more for the Ferrari, as Rosberg emerged behind Vettel one lap later. However, Vettel ran wide on the exit of the final corner on lap 36, letting Rosberg past and damaging his front wing, meaning he had to come into the pit lane for an unscheduled stop on the next lap, leaving him down in fifth position. His teammate Räikkönen made a second pit stop on lap 40, taking the softer and faster tyres, trying to catch the two Mercedes towards the end of the race. Fourteen laps before the finish, Räikkönen was fifteen seconds down on second-placed Rosberg, but closing by more than a second per lap. With the Mercedes in front having to make their way through backmarkers, Räikkönen was able to cut down the gap even faster, reaching Rosberg with three laps of the race to go. Rosberg, suffering from brake overheating over the entire course of the race, outbraked himself at turn one on lap 56, which allowed Räikkönen to take second place from him. The other Mercedes of Hamilton had brake problems as well towards the end, but was able to control the gap to the Ferrari to take his third victory of the season.

Four-time world champion Vettel however was unable to overtake the Williams of Valtteri Bottas for fourth. The other Williams of Felipe Massa had applied the undercut well in the early part of the race to recover from his pit lane-start to eighth position, but when his tyres started to degrade he was passed by both Sergio Pérez and Daniil Kvyat and finished tenth, taking one point. The race ended spectacularly when the Red Bull of Daniel Ricciardo suffered an engine blow-up on the final straight, just being able to coast his car over the finish line.

=== Post-race ===
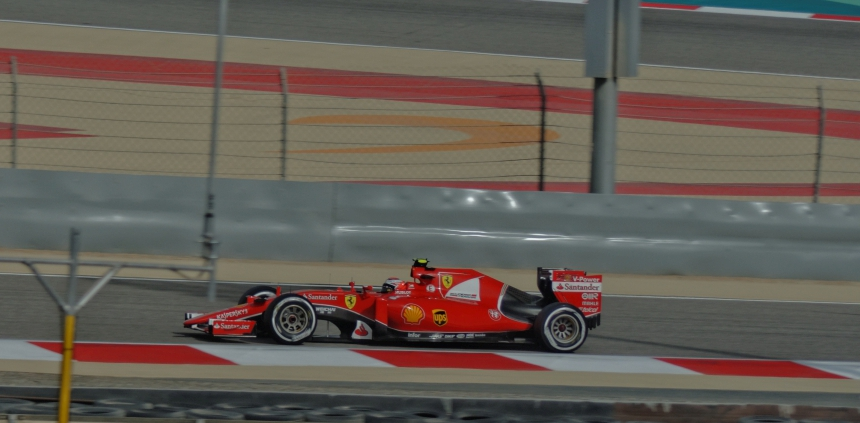
Kimi Räikkönen returned to the podium after an 18-month absence and was praised for his performance.

During the podium interviews conducted by three-time world champion Jackie Stewart, Lewis Hamilton conceded it had been a tough race, saying: "The Ferraris gave us a real good run for our money and out there it was really difficult to look after the tyres in these conditions, behind backmarkers and all sorts, but fortunately I was able to keep the car together, keep the tyres as healthy as possible and pull it through." Kimi Räikkönen expressed disappointment with not being able to win, but said he was "very happy how the team is working" and highlighted the big step forward Ferrari had made over the winter. Nico Rosberg was disappointed about the brake failure costing him second place, but added that he was very happy with the car altogether.

Sebastian Vettel said he felt that he had let the team down with his mistake that cost him a chance to challenge Rosberg for second position himself, but was happy with "a good recovery and still some decent points".

After the race, particular praise from the press was directed at Räikkönen, who returned to the podium for the first time since the 2013 Korean Grand Prix, 18 months prior. German newspaper Süddeutsche Zeitung called his drive a "cool application" for a contract extension after 2015.

After Daniel Ricciardo's engine gave up on the finish straight of the last lap, he was already down to his last engine of the season after only four races. Should he needed to use another one, he would face grid penalties. This added to Renault's problems, after the two Toro Rosso drivers also failed to finish and put more strain on the relationship between Red Bull and their engine provider. Max Verstappen was quoted calling the engine "a bit of a nightmare", saying it could jeopardise the goal of fifth place for Toro Rosso in the constructors' championship. Subsequently, team principal Christian Horner confirmed that the teams would agree on the plan decided upon earlier that year, to increase the engine limit from four to five, taking some of the pressure off Red Bull and Ricciardo.

== Classification ==
=== Qualifying ===
Pos.	Car no.	Driver	Constructor	Qualifying times			Final grid
Pos.	Car no.	Driver	Constructor	Q1	Q2	Q3	Final grid
1	44	(United Kingdom) Lewis Hamilton	Mercedes	1:33.928	1:32.669	1:32.571	1
2	5	(Germany) Sebastian Vettel	Ferrari	1:34.919	1:33.623	1:32.982	2
3	6	(Germany) Nico Rosberg	Mercedes	1:34.398	1:33.878	1:33.129	3
4	7	(Finland) Kimi Räikkönen	Ferrari	1:34.568	1:33.540	1:33.227	4
5	77	(Finland) Valtteri Bottas	Williams-Mercedes	1:34.161	1:33.897	1:33.381	5
6	19	(Brazil) Felipe Massa	Williams-Mercedes	1:34.488	1:33.551	1:33.744	6
7	3	(Australia) Daniel Ricciardo	Red Bull Racing-Renault	1:34.691	1:34.403	1:33.832	7
8	27	(Germany) Nico Hülkenberg	Force India-Mercedes	1:35.653	1:34.613	1:34.450	8
9	55	(Spain) Carlos Sainz Jr.	Toro Rosso-Renault	1:35.371	1:34.641	1:34.462	9
10	8	(France) Romain Grosjean	Lotus-Mercedes	1:35.007	1:34.123	1:34.484	10
11	11	(Mexico) Sergio Pérez	Force India-Mercedes	1:35.451	1:34.704		11
12	12	(Brazil) Felipe Nasr	Sauber-Ferrari	1:35.310	1:34.737		12
13	9	(Sweden) Marcus Ericsson	Sauber-Ferrari	1:35.438	1:35.034		13
14	14	(Spain) Fernando Alonso	McLaren-Honda	1:35.205	1:35.039		14
15	33	(Netherlands) Max Verstappen	Toro Rosso-Renault	1:35.611	1:35.103		15
16	13	(Venezuela) Pastor Maldonado	Lotus-Mercedes	1:35.677			16
17	26	(Russia) Daniil Kvyat	Red Bull Racing-Renault	1:35.800			17
18	28	(United Kingdom) Will Stevens	Marussia-Ferrari	1:38.713			18
19	98	(Spain) Roberto Merhi	Marussia-Ferrari	1:39.722			19
107% time: 1:40.502
—	22	(United Kingdom) Jenson Button	McLaren-Honda	no time			20^{1}

Notes

- ^1 – Jenson Button received permission from the stewards to start the race despite not setting a qualifying time.

=== Race ===
Pos.	No.	Driver	Constructor	Laps	Time/Retired	Grid	Points
1	44	(United Kingdom) Lewis Hamilton	Mercedes	57	1:35:05.809	1	25
2	7	(Finland) Kimi Räikkönen	Ferrari	57	+3.380	4	18
3	6	(Germany) Nico Rosberg	Mercedes	57	+6.033	3	15
4	77	(Finland) Valtteri Bottas	Williams-Mercedes	57	+42.957	5	12
5	5	(Germany) Sebastian Vettel	Ferrari	57	+43.989	2	10
6	3	(Australia) Daniel Ricciardo	Red Bull Racing-Renault	57	+1:01.751	7	8
7	8	(France) Romain Grosjean	Lotus-Mercedes	57	+1:24.763	10	6
8	11	(Mexico) Sergio Pérez	Force India-Mercedes	56	+1 Lap	11	4
9	26	(Russia) Daniil Kvyat	Red Bull Racing-Renault	56	+1 Lap	17	2
10	19	(Brazil) Felipe Massa	Williams-Mercedes	56	+1 Lap	6	1
11	14	(Spain) Fernando Alonso	McLaren-Honda	56	+1 Lap	14	
12	12	(Brazil) Felipe Nasr	Sauber-Ferrari	56	+1 Lap	12	
13	27	(Germany) Nico Hülkenberg	Force India-Mercedes	56	+1 Lap	8	
14	9	(Sweden) Marcus Ericsson	Sauber-Ferrari	56	+1 Lap	13	
15	13	(Venezuela) Pastor Maldonado	Lotus-Mercedes	56	+1 Lap	16^{1}	
16	28	(United Kingdom) Will Stevens	Marussia-Ferrari	55	+2 Laps	18^{1}	
17	98	(Spain) Roberto Merhi	Marussia-Ferrari	54	+3 Laps	19	
Ret	33	(Netherlands) Max Verstappen	Toro Rosso-Renault	34	Electrical	15	
Ret	55	(Spain) Carlos Sainz Jr.	Toro Rosso-Renault	29	Wheel hub	9	
DNS	22	(United Kingdom) Jenson Button	McLaren-Honda	0	Power Unit	—^{2}	

Notes

- ^1 – Pastor Maldonado mistakenly lined up in 18th position on the starting grid. This pushed Will Stevens behind him one row down as well, while the 16th slot was left vacant. Maldonado received a 5-second penalty as a result.
- ^2 – McLaren were unable to start Jenson Button's car due to a problem with the Energy Recovery System, as a result of which it remained in the pit lane altogether.

== Championship standings after the race ==
Drivers' Championship standings

+/–	Pos.	Driver	Points
	1	(United Kingdom) Lewis Hamilton	93
1	2	(Germany) Nico Rosberg	66
1	3	(Germany) Sebastian Vettel	65
1	4	(Finland) Kimi Räikkönen	42
1	5	(Brazil) Felipe Massa	31

Constructors' Championship standings

+/–	Pos.	Constructor	Points
	1	(Germany) Mercedes	159
	2	(Italy) Ferrari	107
	3	(United Kingdom) Williams-Mercedes	61
1	4	(Austria) Red Bull Racing-Renault	23
1	5	(Switzerland) Sauber-Ferrari	19

- Note: Only the top five positions are included for both sets of standings.

== See also ==
- 2015 Bahrain GP2 Series round

Previous race: 2015 Chinese Grand Prix	FIA Formula One World Championship; 2015 season	Next race: 2015 Spanish Grand Prix
Previous race: 2014 Bahrain Grand Prix	Bahrain Grand Prix	Next race: 2016 Bahrain Grand Prix
