= 2015 Spanish Grand Prix =

Race 5 of 19 in the 2015 Formula One World Championship
← Previous race	Next race →
- Circuit de Barcelona-Catalunya

Race details
- Date: 10 May 2015
- Official name: Formula 1 Gran Premio de España Pirelli 2015
- Location: Circuit de Barcelona-Catalunya; Montmeló, Spain
- Course: Permanent racing facility
- Course length: 4.655 km (2.892 mi)
- Distance: 66 laps, 307.104 km (190.826 mi)
- Weather: Sunny; 25 °C (77 °F) air temperature 44 °C (111 °F) track temperature 1.8 m/s (5.9 ft/s) wind from the northeast
- Attendance: 86,700 (Race Day)

Pole position
Driver	(Germany) Nico Rosberg	Mercedes
- Time: 1:24.681

Fastest lap
Driver	(United Kingdom) Lewis Hamilton	Mercedes
- Time: 1:28.270 on lap 54

Podium
First	(Germany) Nico Rosberg	Mercedes
Second	(United Kingdom) Lewis Hamilton	Mercedes
Third	(Germany) Sebastian Vettel	Ferrari

The 2015 Spanish Grand Prix, formally titled the Formula 1 Gran Premio de España Pirelli 2015, was a Formula One motor race held on 10 May 2015 at the Circuit de Barcelona-Catalunya in Montmeló, Spain. The race was the fifth round of the 2015 season and marked the forty-fifth running of the Spanish Grand Prix as a round of the Formula One World Championship and the twenty-fifth running at Catalunya. Mercedes driver Nico Rosberg took his first win of the season, his first in Spain and the ninth of his career. His team-mate Lewis Hamilton finished second after a bad start, followed by Sebastian Vettel in third.

== Report ==
=== Background ===
Mercedes were expected to be dominant in Barcelona, since it was at the circuit that their advantage per lap had been biggest in 2014 and they had shown strong form at the two pre-season tests at the circuit.

After problems with their engine in the first races, which saw Daniel Ricciardo down to his last power unit after just four outings, Renault introduced a new, modified engine for the Spanish Grand Prix, aiming to improve both reliability and drivability.

Ferrari brought new parts to Barcelona, but Kimi Räikkönen was unsatisfied with the handling of his car, switching back to the earlier setup for the third practice session. He later conceded that "maybe it would have been better with the new bits." McLaren arrived in Barcelona with a new dark grey livery in order to "improv[e] its visual impact [...] for the floodlights increasingly used in twilight and night races," a team representative said.

==== Tyres ====
On 22 April, Pirelli announced that the teams would be using the hard and medium tyres for this race, the same choice as the year before.

=== Free practice ===
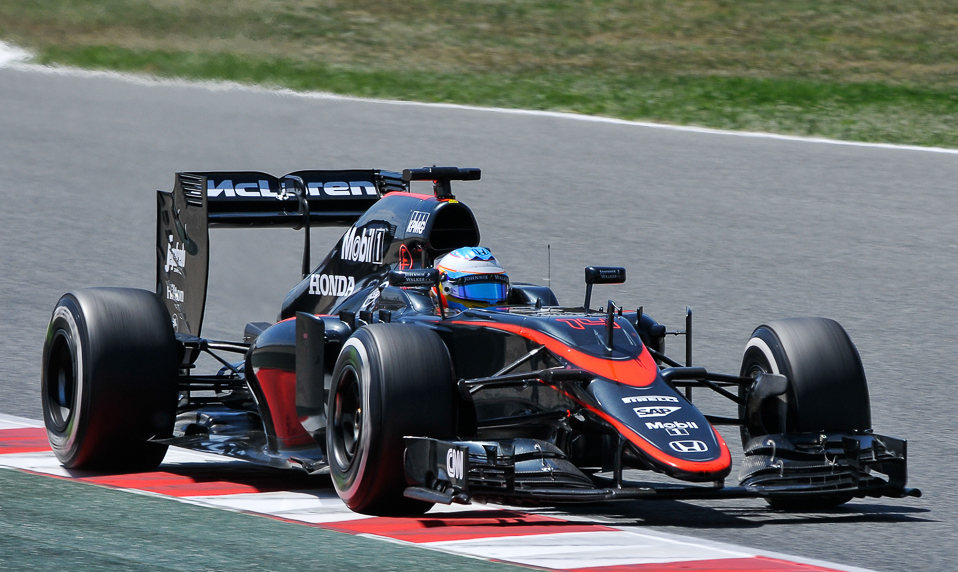
Local favourite Fernando Alonso's McLaren sporting the team's new, dark grey livery

Per the regulations for the 2015 season, three practice sessions were held, two 1.5-hour sessions on Friday and another one-hour session before qualifying on Saturday. Nico Rosberg was fastest on Friday morning, outpacing his teammate Lewis Hamilton by 0.07 seconds. Rosberg raised the interest of the race stewards when he failed to stay to the left of the bollard at the pit lane entrance returning to pit lane after one of his runs. Mercedes lived up to the expectations by lapping almost a second quicker than the next fastest cars, the two Ferrari drivers. Three test drivers took part in the session: Jolyon Palmer took the place of Romain Grosjean at the wheel of one of the Lotus cars as he had done in the two prior races; Raffaele Marciello returned for Sauber after he had already filled the role at the Malaysian Grand Prix; and making her debut for 2015 was Susie Wolff for Williams, finishing eight-tenths of a second behind regular driver Felipe Massa.

Lewis Hamilton was quickest in the second session on Friday afternoon. Track temperatures rose by more than 20 °C (36 °F) to almost 50 °C (122 °F) at the end of the session. The extreme heat was especially hard on the tyres, which led to many drivers complaining about a lack of grip on track. Sebastian Vettel split the two Mercedes cars and finished second fastest, four-tenths of a second slower than Hamilton, with Rosberg a further three tenths down. Daniel Ricciardo struggled with his engine yet again, which needed to be changed mid-session, leaving him with only ten minutes of running. McLaren were yet to score in 2015, but with Jenson Button finishing seventh and Fernando Alonso in eleventh place, they proved to be closer to the point ranks than in previous races. Romain Grosjean suffered from technical problems on his Lotus, which ended in the engine cover of his car shattering on the start-finish straight, bringing out a red flag.

The third practice session, on Saturday morning, showed that Mercedes' advantage on the softer, medium tyres was less significant than on the hard compound, meaning Vettel was able to lap within two-tenths of a second of Rosberg, who was fastest. Hamilton spun in turn three, compromising his session. He finished third fastest, two-tenths down on his teammate. Kimi Räikkönen, who was fifth fastest, was once more unsatisfied with the setup of his car, as he could be heard on the radio telling his team "Excellent. How can we be in wrong settings?"

=== Qualifying ===
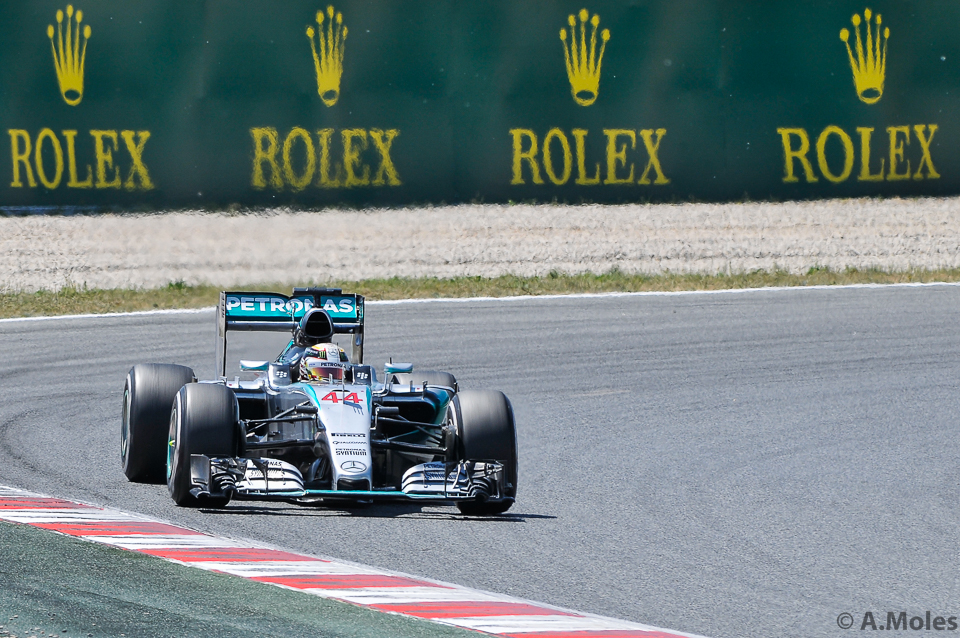
For the first time in 2015, Lewis Hamilton did not take pole position.

Qualifying consisted of three parts, 18, 15 and 12 minutes in length respectively, with five drivers eliminated from competing after each of the first two sessions. During the first session (Q1), Mercedes was able to proceed into the next part without having to use the softer and faster tyre compound. The same applied for Sebastian Vettel, while his Ferrari teammate Kimi Räikkönen was once again unhappy with his setup and recorded his time on the softer medium tyres. McLaren's upward trend continued, as both cars progressed into Q2, the first time the team achieved this in 2015. The Manor Marussia drivers took their familiar place at the back of the grid, Will Stevens in 19th almost three seconds off the time of the next-slowest car. Both Force India cars as well as the Sauber of Marcus Ericsson did not make it into Q2 either.

The second part of qualifying saw both Mercedes drivers and Valtteri Bottas make only one timed run, which proved sufficient to get into Q3 comfortably. The second Sauber of Felipe Nasr was eliminated as were both McLarens and both Lotus cars, meaning that the last five rows on the grid would each be taken by pairs of teammates.

For the last session of qualifying, the top ten drivers had twelve minutes to set their times. Nico Rosberg recorded provisional pole on his first outing, a quarter of a second in front of teammate Lewis Hamilton. Unlike their teammates, both Felipe Massa in the Williams and Kimi Räikkönen did not have an extra set of fresh tyres, meaning they were caught out by the fast-running Toro Rosso drivers, who took the third row on the grid. Neither Rosberg nor Hamilton were able to improve on their times in their second running. For the first time in 2015, it was not Hamilton who would start the race first on the grid, as Rosberg recorded the 16th pole position of his career.

==== Post-qualifying ====
Toro Rosso were delighted with their result, even though Carlos Sainz Jr. admitted he did not expect to fare as well in the race. Rosberg was satisfied with his first pole position of the season, commenting "of course I needed it sooner rather than later," referring to the 27-point gap in the championship to Hamilton. As pole position is statistically of crucial importance to winning the race, even more so than in Monaco, being first on the grid was considered to be a big advantage for Rosberg.

=== Race ===
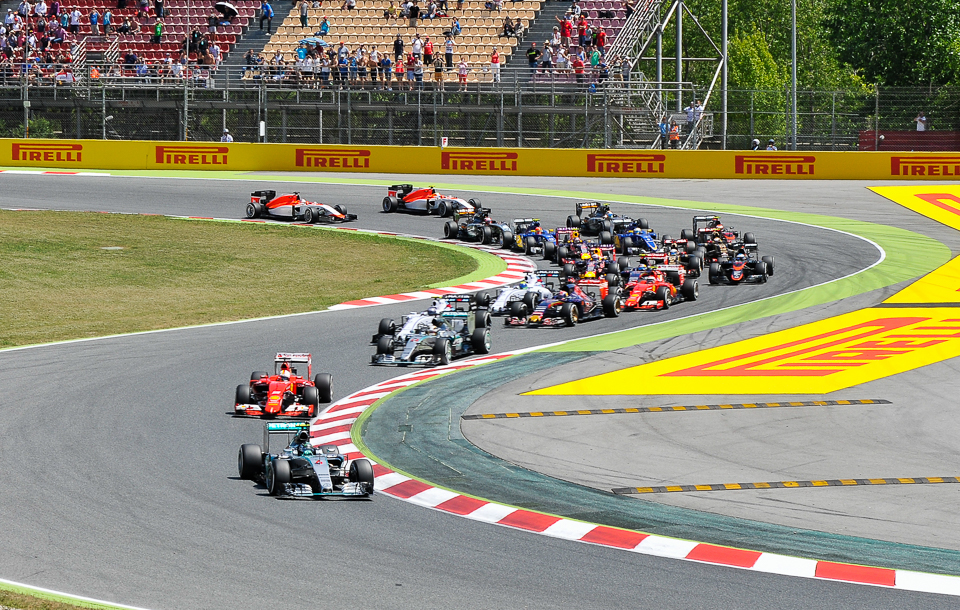
The start of the race

At the start of the race, Lewis Hamilton did not get away well, having to yield second place to Sebastian Vettel while also coming under pressure from Valtteri Bottas. Nico Rosberg remained in front while the rest of the field got through the first corners without incidents. Kimi Räikkönen had a good first lap and moved up to fifth. The Toro Rosso drivers were unable to capitalise on their good qualifying performances and steadily headed down the order. As Rosberg was developing a lead, Hamilton told his team that overtaking Vettel on track was "impossible." Mercedes switched him to a three-stop strategy, starting on lap 14, but his first stop was marred by a problem with the wheel nut, not being able to get ahead of Rosberg who made a pit stop two laps later without problems. During the following laps, Hamilton tried to overtake Vettel on track, but to no avail. Unlike the top runners, Kimi Räikkönen did not take the medium tyres during his middle stint, but chose instead to run on the hard compound, meaning he would be a force to watch towards the end of the race.

Battles for position in midfield during the opening laps saw the two Lotus cars touch, damaging Pastor Maldonado's rear wing. When he came into the pit for his first stop, the entire right side plate of the wing was taken off, later forcing him to retire on lap 47. Fernando Alonso had previously become the first retirement of the race when his brake failed due to a torn-off visor lodging in his rear brake. When he came into the pit lane on lap 28, he overshot his pit box and hit a mechanic, and was unable to continue. Red Bull, who had a troublesome weekend, qualifying behind their sister team Toro Rosso, made up for lost ground and moved ahead to eventually finish seventh and tenth.

Up in front, Hamilton put his three-stop strategy to good use, consistently setting the fastest laps on track. On lap 46, Rosberg made a pit stop for the second and final time, emerging just a few seconds ahead of Hamilton, who quickly moved past him into the lead. Hamilton came in for his last stop on lap 51, easily retaining second place in front of Vettel's Ferrari. He subsequently tried to close the gap to Rosberg in front, but a 19-second lead proved impossible to overcome in the remaining 14 laps. Räikkönen had closed in on Valtteri Bottas and tried to overtake him during the last laps of the race, but was eventually unable to do so, leaving him in fifth position, lamenting his poor qualifying performance. As the race drew to a close, Rosberg crossed the line for his first victory of the season and the ninth of his career. Rosberg's victory made him the ninth different winner of the Spanish Grand Prix in as many years.

=== Post-race ===
Race winner Nico Rosberg said he had a "perfect weekend" during the podium interview conducted by Spanish TV presenter Maria Serrat. At the official post-race press conference, Lewis Hamilton conceded that it had "been a long time since I've had such a poor start" and went on to explain how difficult it is to overtake on the circuit. Sebastian Vettel admitted that had Hamilton's first stop not gone wrong, it would have been unlikely to stay ahead of him at that point.

Kimi Räikkönen, who had decided to drive with the old setup of the car, later stated that he had made a "sacrifice" for the team, saying "I think we learned a lot from going for two separate cars following yesterday and today so I'm more confident we can see things more balanced." He went on to point out that the characteristics of the circuit suited Mercedes more than Ferrari, as they had more downforce and raw speed, stating he was not too concerned with the "bigger than normal" gap, after Vettel had finished 45 seconds behind Rosberg.

Following another difficult weekend and constant problems with their underpowered Renault power units, Red Bull repeated their threats voiced earlier in the season to exit the sport. Their motorsport advisor Helmut Marko was quoted saying: "If we don't have a competitive engine in the near future, then either Audi is coming or we are out." Audi had just two weeks earlier stated that it had "no plans to enter Formula 1." Team principal Christian Horner had earlier declared the 2015 season a "write-off" based on their engine reliability issues.

== Classification ==
=== Qualifying ===
Pos.	Car no.	Driver	Constructor	Qualifying times			Final grid
Pos.	Car no.	Driver	Constructor	Q1	Q2	Q3	Final grid
1	6	(Germany) Nico Rosberg	Mercedes	1:26.490	1:25.166	1:24.681	1
2	44	(United Kingdom) Lewis Hamilton	Mercedes	1:26.382	1:25.740	1:24.948	2
3	5	(Germany) Sebastian Vettel	Ferrari	1:27.534	1:26.167	1:25.458	3
4	77	(Finland) Valtteri Bottas	Williams-Mercedes	1:27.262	1:26.197	1:25.694	4
5	55	(Spain) Carlos Sainz Jr.	Toro Rosso-Renault	1:26.773	1:26.475	1:26.136	5
6	33	(Netherlands) Max Verstappen	Toro Rosso-Renault	1:27.393	1:26.441	1:26.249	6
7	7	(Finland) Kimi Räikkönen	Ferrari	1:26.637	1:26.016	1:26.414	7
8	26	(Russia) Daniil Kvyat	Red Bull Racing-Renault	1:27.833	1:26.889	1:26.629	8
9	19	(Brazil) Felipe Massa	Williams-Mercedes	1:27.165	1:26.147	1:26.757	9
10	3	(Australia) Daniel Ricciardo	Red Bull Racing-Renault	1:27.611	1:26.692	1:26.770	10
11	8	(France) Romain Grosjean	Lotus-Mercedes	1:27.383	1:27.375		11
12	13	(Venezuela) Pastor Maldonado	Lotus-Mercedes	1:27.281	1:27.450		12
13	14	(Spain) Fernando Alonso	McLaren-Honda	1:27.941	1:27.760		13
14	22	(United Kingdom) Jenson Button	McLaren-Honda	1:27.813	1:27.854		14
15	12	(Brazil) Felipe Nasr	Sauber-Ferrari	1:27.625	1:28.005		15
16	9	(Sweden) Marcus Ericsson	Sauber-Ferrari	1:28.112			16
17	27	(Germany) Nico Hülkenberg	Force India-Mercedes	1:28.365			17
18	11	(Mexico) Sergio Pérez	Force India-Mercedes	1:28.442			18
19	28	(United Kingdom) Will Stevens	Marussia-Ferrari	1:31.200			19
20	98	(Spain) Roberto Merhi	Marussia-Ferrari	1:32.038			20
107% time: 1:32.428

=== Race ===
Pos.	No.	Driver	Constructor	Laps	Time/Retired	Grid	Points
1	6	(Germany) Nico Rosberg	Mercedes	66	1:41:12.555	1	25
2	44	(United Kingdom) Lewis Hamilton	Mercedes	66	+17.551	2	18
3	5	(Germany) Sebastian Vettel	Ferrari	66	+45.342	3	15
4	77	(Finland) Valtteri Bottas	Williams-Mercedes	66	+59.217	4	12
5	7	(Finland) Kimi Räikkönen	Ferrari	66	+1:00.002	7	10
6	19	(Brazil) Felipe Massa	Williams-Mercedes	66	+1:21.314	9	8
7	3	(Australia) Daniel Ricciardo	Red Bull Racing-Renault	65	+1 Lap	10	6
8	8	(France) Romain Grosjean	Lotus-Mercedes	65	+1 Lap	11	4
9	55	(Spain) Carlos Sainz Jr.	Toro Rosso-Renault	65	+1 Lap	5	2
10	26	(Russia) Daniil Kvyat	Red Bull Racing-Renault	65	+1 Lap	8	1
11	33	(Netherlands) Max Verstappen	Toro Rosso-Renault	65	+1 Lap	6	
12	12	(Brazil) Felipe Nasr	Sauber-Ferrari	65	+1 Lap	15	
13	11	(Mexico) Sergio Pérez	Force India-Mercedes	65	+1 Lap	18	
14	9	(Sweden) Marcus Ericsson	Sauber-Ferrari	65	+1 Lap	16	
15	27	(Germany) Nico Hülkenberg	Force India-Mercedes	65	+1 Lap	17	
16	22	(United Kingdom) Jenson Button	McLaren-Honda	65	+1 Lap	14	
17	28	(United Kingdom) Will Stevens	Marussia-Ferrari	63	+3 Laps	19	
18	98	(Spain) Roberto Merhi	Marussia-Ferrari	62	+4 Laps	20	
Ret	13	(Venezuela) Pastor Maldonado	Lotus-Mercedes	45	Collision damage	12	
Ret	14	(Spain) Fernando Alonso	McLaren-Honda	26	Brakes	13	

== Championship standings after the race ==
Drivers' Championship standings

	Pos.	Driver	Points
	1	(United Kingdom) Lewis Hamilton	111
	2	(Germany) Nico Rosberg	91
	3	(Germany) Sebastian Vettel	80
	4	(Finland) Kimi Räikkönen	52
1	5	(Finland) Valtteri Bottas	42

Constructors' Championship standings

Pos.	Constructor	Points
1	(Germany) Mercedes	202
2	(Italy) Ferrari	132
3	(United Kingdom) Williams-Mercedes	81
4	(Austria) Red Bull Racing-Renault	30
5	(Switzerland) Sauber-Ferrari	19

- Note: Only the top five positions are included for both sets of standings.

== See also ==
- 2015 Catalunya GP2 Series round
- 2015 Catalunya GP3 Series round

Previous race: 2015 Bahrain Grand Prix	FIA Formula One World Championship; 2015 season	Next race: 2015 Monaco Grand Prix
Previous race: 2014 Spanish Grand Prix	Spanish Grand Prix	Next race: 2016 Spanish Grand Prix
