= Force India Grand Prix results =

Formula One team results

These are the complete Grand Prix racing results for Sahara Force India.

== Complete Formula One results ==
(key)

Year	Chassis	Engine	Tyres	Drivers	1	2	3	4	5	6	7	8	9	10	11	12	13	14	15	16	17	18	19	20	21	Points	WCC
2008	VJM01	Ferrari 056 2.4 V8	B		AUS	MAL	BHR	ESP	TUR	MON	CAN	FRA	GBR	GER	HUN	EUR	BEL	ITA	SIN	JPN	CHN	BRA				0	10th
2008	VJM01	Ferrari 056 2.4 V8	B	(Germany) Adrian Sutil	Ret	Ret	19	Ret	16	Ret	Ret	19	Ret	15	Ret	Ret	13	19	Ret	Ret	Ret	16				0	10th
2008	VJM01	Ferrari 056 2.4 V8	B	(Italy) Giancarlo Fisichella	Ret	12	12	10	Ret	Ret	Ret	18	Ret	16	15	14	17	Ret	14	Ret	17	18				0	10th
2009	VJM02	Mercedes FO 108W 2.4 V8	B		AUS	MAL	CHN	BHR	ESP	MON	TUR	GBR	GER	HUN	EUR	BEL	ITA	SIN	JPN	BRA	ABU					13	9th
2009	VJM02	Mercedes FO 108W 2.4 V8	B	(Germany) Adrian Sutil	9	17	17^{†}	16	Ret	14	17	17	15	Ret	10	11	4^{F}	Ret	13	Ret	17					13	9th
2009	VJM02	Mercedes FO 108W 2.4 V8	B	(Italy) Giancarlo Fisichella	11	18^{†}	14	15	14	9	Ret	10	11	14	12	2^{P}										13	9th
2009	VJM02	Mercedes FO 108W 2.4 V8	B	(Italy) Vitantonio Liuzzi													Ret	14	14	11	15					13	9th
2010	VJM03	Mercedes FO 108X 2.4 V8	B		BHR	AUS	MAL	CHN	ESP	MON	TUR	CAN	EUR	GBR	GER	HUN	BEL	ITA	SIN	JPN	KOR	BRA	ABU			68	7th
2010	VJM03	Mercedes FO 108X 2.4 V8	B	(Germany) Adrian Sutil	12	Ret	5	11	7	8	9	10	6	8	17	Ret	5	16	9	Ret	Ret	12	13			68	7th
2010	VJM03	Mercedes FO 108X 2.4 V8	B	(Italy) Vitantonio Liuzzi	9	7	Ret	Ret	15^{†}	9	13	9	16	11	16	13	10	12	Ret	Ret	6	Ret	Ret			68	7th
2011	VJM04	Mercedes FO 108Y 2.4 V8	P		AUS	MAL	CHN	TUR	ESP	MON	CAN	EUR	GBR	GER	HUN	BEL	ITA	SIN	JPN	KOR	IND	ABU	BRA			69	6th
2011	VJM04	Mercedes FO 108Y 2.4 V8	P	(Germany) Adrian Sutil	9	11	15	13	13	7	Ret	9	11	6	14	7	Ret	8	11	11	9	8	6			69	6th
2011	VJM04	Mercedes FO 108Y 2.4 V8	P	(United Kingdom) Paul di Resta	10	10	11	Ret	12	12	18^{†}	14	15	13	7	11	8	6	12	10	13	9	8			69	6th
2012	VJM05	Mercedes FO 108Z 2.4 V8	P		AUS	MAL	CHN	BHR	ESP	MON	CAN	EUR	GBR	GER	HUN	BEL	ITA	SIN	JPN	KOR	IND	ABU	USA	BRA		109	7th
2012	VJM05	Mercedes FO 108Z 2.4 V8	P	(United Kingdom) Paul di Resta	10	7	12	6	14	7	11	7	Ret	11	12	10	8	4	12	12	12	9	15	19^{†}		109	7th
2012	VJM05	Mercedes FO 108Z 2.4 V8	P	(Germany) Nico Hülkenberg	Ret	9	15	12	10	8	12	5	12	9	11	4	21^{†}	14^{F}	7	6	8	Ret	8	5		109	7th
2013	VJM06	Mercedes FO 108Z 2.4 V8	P		AUS	MAL	CHN	BHR	ESP	MON	CAN	GBR	GER	HUN	BEL	ITA	SIN	KOR	JPN	IND	ABU	USA	BRA			77	6th
2013	VJM06	Mercedes FO 108Z 2.4 V8	P	(United Kingdom) Paul di Resta	8	Ret	8	4	7	9	7	9	11	18^{†}	Ret	Ret	20^{†}	Ret	11	8	6	15	11			77	6th
2013	VJM06	Mercedes FO 108Z 2.4 V8	P	(Germany) Adrian Sutil	7	Ret	Ret	13	13	5	10	7	13	Ret	9	16^{†}	10	20^{†}	14	9	10	Ret	13			77	6th
2014	VJM07	Mercedes PU106A Hybrid 1.6 V6 t	P		AUS	MAL	BHR	CHN	ESP	MON	CAN	AUT	GBR	GER	HUN	BEL	ITA	SIN	JPN	RUS	USA	BRA	ABU			155	6th
2014	VJM07	Mercedes PU106A Hybrid 1.6 V6 t	P	(Mexico) Sergio Pérez	10	DNS	3	9	9	Ret	11^{†}	6^{F}	11	10	Ret	8	7	7	10	10	Ret	15	7			155	6th
2014	VJM07	Mercedes PU106A Hybrid 1.6 V6 t	P	(Germany) Nico Hülkenberg	6	5	5	6	10	5	5	9	8	7	Ret	10	12	9	8	12	Ret	8	6			155	6th
2015	VJM08	Mercedes PU106B Hybrid 1.6 V6 t	P		AUS	MAL	CHN	BHR	ESP	MON	CAN	AUT	GBR	HUN	BEL	ITA	SIN	JPN	RUS	USA	MEX	BRA	ABU			136	5th
2015	VJM08	Mercedes PU106B Hybrid 1.6 V6 t	P	(Mexico) Sergio Pérez	10	13	11	8	13	7	11	9														136	5th
2015	VJM08	Mercedes PU106B Hybrid 1.6 V6 t	P	(Germany) Nico Hülkenberg	7	14	Ret	13	15	11	8	6														136	5th
2015	VJM08B	Mercedes PU106B Hybrid 1.6 V6 t	P	(Mexico) Sergio Pérez									9	Ret	5	6	7	12	3	5	8	12	5			136	5th
2015	VJM08B	Mercedes PU106B Hybrid 1.6 V6 t	P	(Germany) Nico Hülkenberg									7	Ret	DNS	7	Ret	6	Ret	Ret	7	6	7			136	5th
2016	VJM09	Mercedes PU106C Hybrid 1.6 V6 t	P		AUS	BHR	CHN	RUS	ESP	MON	CAN	EUR	AUT	GBR	HUN	GER	BEL	ITA	SIN	MAL	JPN	USA	MEX	BRA	ABU	173	4th
2016	VJM09	Mercedes PU106C Hybrid 1.6 V6 t	P	(Mexico) Sergio Pérez	13	16	11	9	7	3	10	3	17^{†}	6	11	10	5	8	8	6	7	8	10	4	8	173	4th
2016	VJM09	Mercedes PU106C Hybrid 1.6 V6 t	P	(Germany) Nico Hülkenberg	7	15	15^{F}	Ret	Ret	6	8	9	19^{†}	7	10	7	4	10	Ret	8	8	Ret	7	7	7	173	4th
2017	VJM10	Mercedes M08 EQ Power+ 1.6 V6 t	P		AUS	CHN	BHR	RUS	ESP	MON	CAN	AZE	AUT	GBR	HUN	BEL	ITA	SIN	MAL	JPN	USA	MEX	BRA	ABU		187	4th
2017	VJM10	Mercedes M08 EQ Power+ 1.6 V6 t	P	(Mexico) Sergio Pérez	7	9	7	6	4	13^{F}	5	Ret	7	9	8	17^{†}	9	5	6	7	8	7	9	7		187	4th
2017	VJM10	Mercedes M08 EQ Power+ 1.6 V6 t	P	(France) Esteban Ocon	10	10	10	7	5	12	6	6	8	8	9	9	6	10	10	6	6	5	Ret	8		187	4th
2018	VJM11	Mercedes M09 EQ Power+ 1.6 V6 t	P		AUS	BHR	CHN	AZE	ESP	MON	CAN	FRA	AUT	GBR	GER	HUN	BEL	ITA	SIN	RUS	JPN	USA	MEX	BRA	ABU	0*	Ex*
2018	VJM11	Mercedes M09 EQ Power+ 1.6 V6 t	P	(Mexico) Sergio Pérez	11	16	12	3	9	12	14	Ret	7	10	7	14										0*	Ex*
2018	VJM11	Mercedes M09 EQ Power+ 1.6 V6 t	P	(France) Esteban Ocon	12	10	11	Ret	Ret	6	9	Ret	6	7	8	13										0*	Ex*

Notes

- * – Force India's 59 points were voided and the team excluded from the championship before the Belgian Grand Prix. The team's assets were sold and then the cars re-entered under the same "Force India-Mercedes" constructor name by a newly-formed team Racing Point Force India; this team was treated as a separate entrant in the Constructors' Championship.
- ^{†} – Driver failed to finish the race, but was classified as he had completed over 90% of the race distance.
