= Force India VJM08 =

Formula One racing car

Force India VJM08 Force India VJM08B
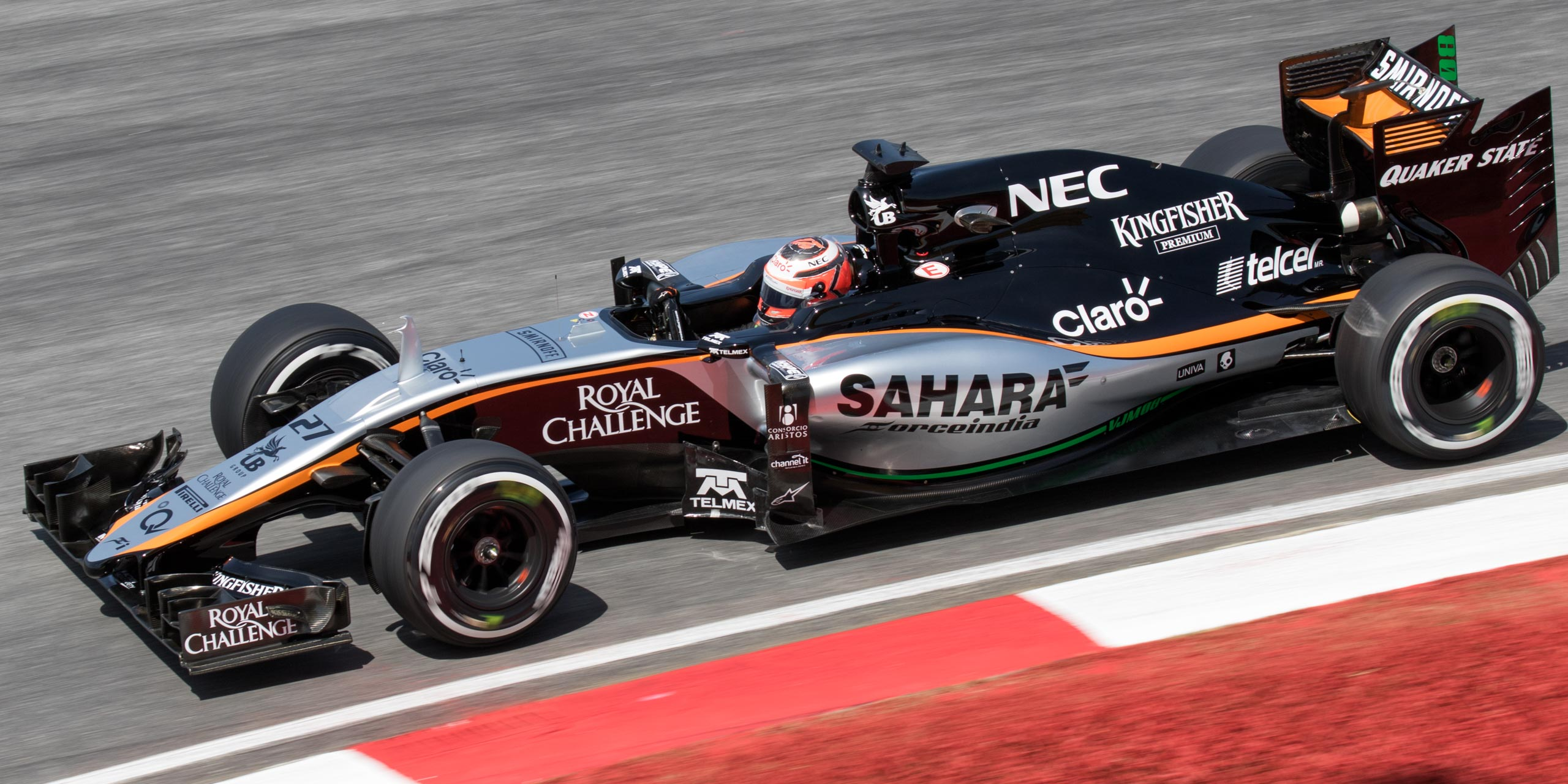
- Hülkenberg driving the VJM08B at the Malaysian Grand Prix
- Category: Formula One
- Constructor: Force India
- Designers: Andrew Green (Technical Director); Simon Phillips (Aerodynamics Director); Ian Hall (Chief Designer); Bruce Eddington (Head of Design, Composites); Daniel Carpenter (Head of Design, Mechanical); Andrew Brown (Head of R&D); Jonathan Marshall (Head of Vehicle Science); Simon Belcher (Chief Aerodynamicist)
- Predecessor: Force India VJM07
- Successor: Force India VJM09

Technical specifications
- Chassis: Moulded carbon fibre and honeycomb composite structure
- Engine: Mercedes PU106B Hybrid Turbo 1.6 L (98 cu in) V6 engine (90°), limited to 15,000 RPM in a mid-mounted, rear-wheel drive layout
- Electric motor: Mercedes PU106B Hybrid Motor Generator Unit–Kinetic (MGU-K) Mercedes PU106B Hybrid Motor Generator Unit–Heat (MGU-H)
- Fuel: Petronas
- Lubricants: Petronas (Note: Quaker State branding appeared on the VJM08, but the car used Petronas lubricants.)
- Tyres: Pirelli P Zero (dry), Cinturato (wet)

Competition history
- Notable entrants: Sahara Force India F1 Team
- Notable drivers: 11. (Mexico) Sergio Pérez; 27. (Germany) Nico Hülkenberg
- Debut: 2015 Australian Grand Prix
- Last event: 2015 Abu Dhabi Grand Prix
Races	Wins	Podiums	Poles	F/Laps
19	0	1	0	0

The Force India VJM08 is a Formula One racing car which Force India used to compete in the 2015 Formula One season. It was driven by Sergio Pérez and Le Mans winner Nico Hülkenberg.

== History ==
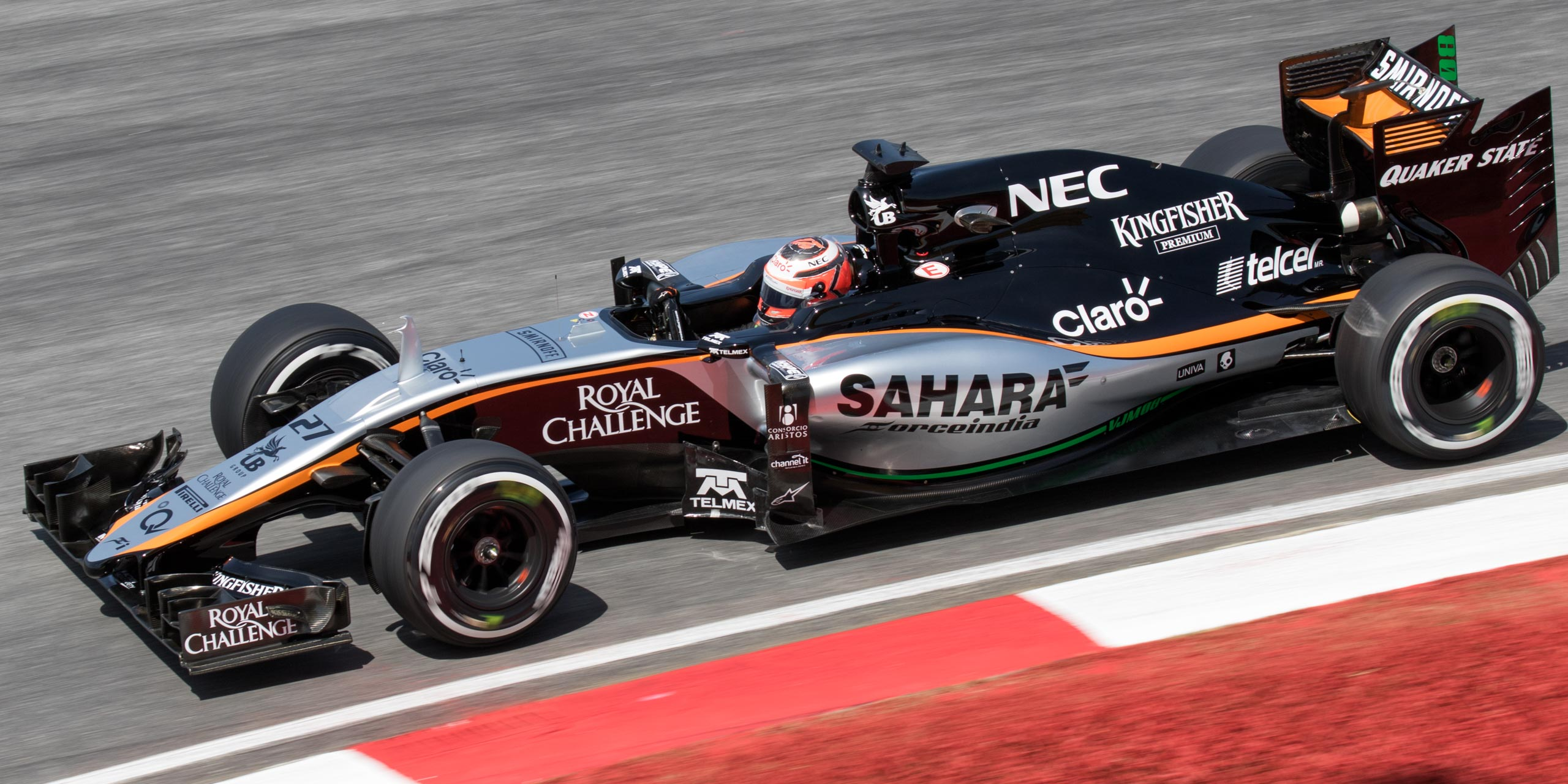
Hülkenberg driving the A-spec version at the Malaysian Grand Prix

The car's livery was first presented at an event in the Museo Soumaya in Mexico City on 21 January 2015, albeit using a modified chassis from a previous car instead of the VJM08 itself. The team did not participate at all in Jerez and elected to use their 2014 car at the first test in Barcelona. The VJM08 finally made its on-track debut at the second and final testing session in Barcelona. This delay was in part due to Force India switching to Toyota's Cologne-based wind tunnel in Germany. The new tunnel allows the team to test 60% scale models as opposed to the 50% scale they had been using with their old tunnel.

The team used a new car development model for the 2015 season. They aimed to increase the car's performance as the season went on through the introduction of a B-spec car and several other upgrades later in the season.

=== VJM08B ===
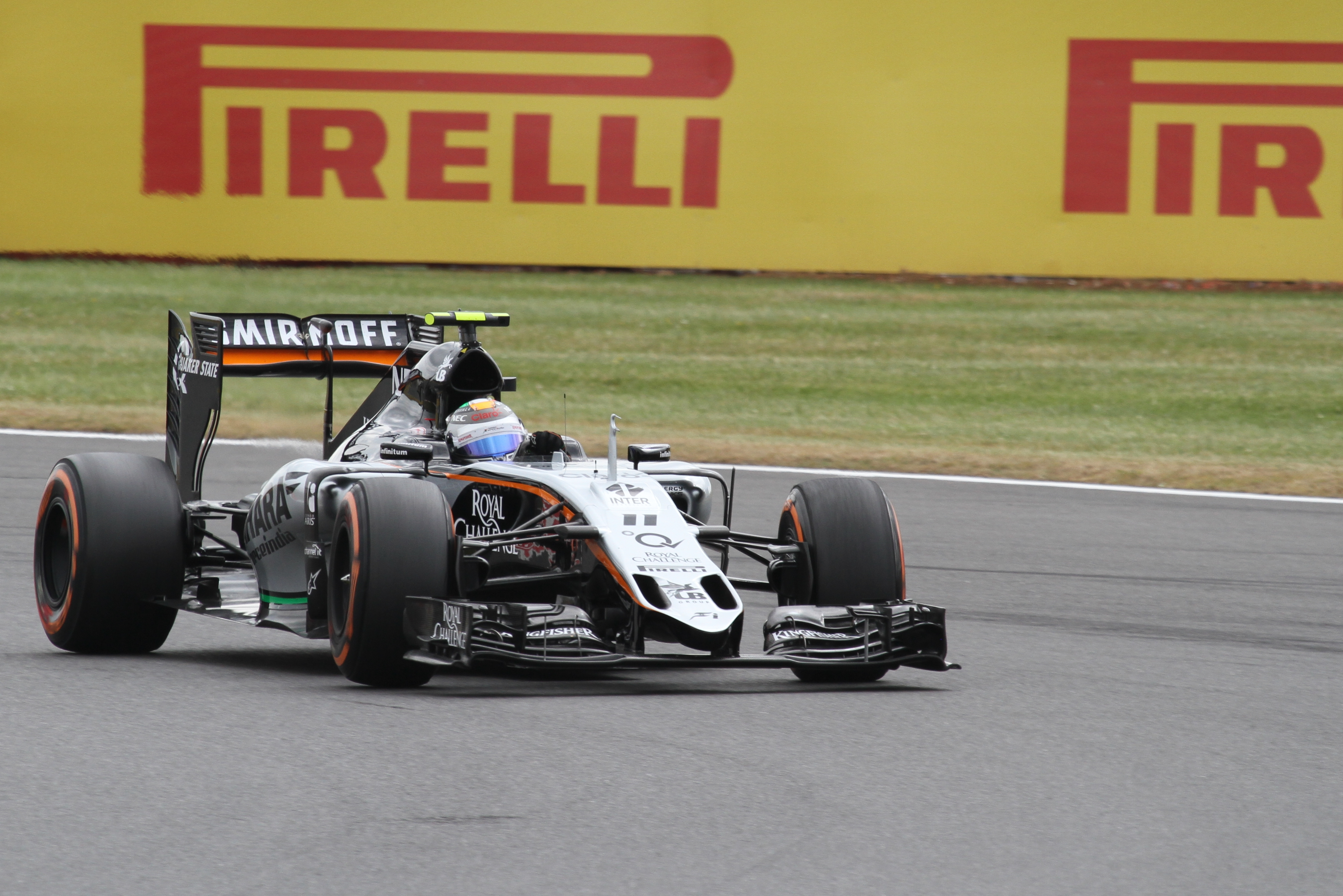
Pérez driving the B-spec version of the car which debuted at the British Grand Prix

For the British Grand Prix, Force India introduced a B-spec version of the car, featuring a distinct shorter nose with two holes in it. Initially, it was questioned whether the new nose complied with the FIA regulations, which did not allow vented noses. To stay within the regulations, the team introduced a spoon-shaped panel under the chassis, which also improved the car's airflow. Hülkenberg praised the changes, saying: "Now the car feels stronger, definitely." Over the course of the season, the team continued to introduce updates to the car including a new front wing, rear wing, rear suspension, floor, front and rear brake ducts and diffuser, among other things. At the Russian Grand Prix, Pérez scored a third-place finish. This was the team's third podium in its history. Ultimately, the team's upturn in form helped them achieve fifth place in the Constructor's Championship, their best season in its history at that point, despite scoring 19 fewer points than with its predecessor, the VJM07.

== Livery ==
The livery was radically changed by removing the shade of white and retaining the black and silver livery. The green and orange stripes were also retained as well.

The team paid tribute to Jules Bianchi in Hungary by carrying a message "Remembering our friend Jules Bianchi" on the rear wing endplate.

== Complete Formula One results ==
(key) (results in bold indicate pole position; results in italics indicate fastest lap)

Year	Chassis	Engine	Tyres	Drivers	1	2	3	4	5	6	7	8	9	10	11	12	13	14	15	16	17	18	19	Points	WCC
2015	VJM08	Mercedes PU106B Hybrid 1.6 V6 t	**P**		AUS	MAL	CHN	BHR	ESP	MON	CAN	AUT	GBR	HUN	BEL	ITA	SIN	JPN	RUS	USA	MEX	BRA	ABU	136	5th
2015	VJM08	Mercedes PU106B Hybrid 1.6 V6 t	**P**	Sergio Pérez	10	13	11	8	13	7	11	9												136	5th
2015	VJM08	Mercedes PU106B Hybrid 1.6 V6 t	**P**	Nico Hülkenberg	7	14	Ret	13	15	11	8	6												136	5th
2015	VJM08B	Mercedes PU106B Hybrid 1.6 V6 t	**P**	Sergio Pérez									9	Ret	5	6	7	12	3	5	8	12	5	136	5th
2015	VJM08B	Mercedes PU106B Hybrid 1.6 V6 t	**P**	Nico Hülkenberg									7	Ret	DNS	7	Ret	6	Ret	Ret	7	6	7	136	5th
