= 2015 Austrian Grand Prix =

Race 8 of 19 in the 2015 Formula One World Championship
| ← Previous race | Next race → |
- Layout of the Red Bull Ring

Race details
- Date: 21 June 2015
- Official name: Formula 1 Rolex Grosser Preis von Österreich 2015
- Location: Red Bull Ring; Spielberg, Styria, Austria
- Course: Permanent racing facility
- Course length: 4.326 km (2.684 miles)
- Distance: 71 laps, 307.146 km (190.564 miles)
- Weather: Cloudy; 14–15 °C (57–59 °F) air temperature 27–32 °C (81–90 °F) track temperature 2 m/s (6.6 ft/s) wind from the west
- Attendance: 120,000 (Weekend) 55,000 (Race Day)

Pole position
| Driver | (United Kingdom) Lewis Hamilton | Mercedes |
- Time: 1:08.455

Fastest lap
| Driver | (Germany) Nico Rosberg | Mercedes |
- Time: 1:11.235 on lap 35

Podium
| First | (Germany) Nico Rosberg | Mercedes |
| Second | (United Kingdom) Lewis Hamilton | Mercedes |
| Third | (Brazil) Felipe Massa | Williams-Mercedes |

The 2015 Austrian Grand Prix (formally known as the Formula 1 Grosser Preis von Österreich 2015) was a Formula One motor race held on 21 June 2015 at the Red Bull Ring in Spielberg, Austria. The race was the eighth round of the 2015 FIA Formula One World Championship, and marked the 29th running of the Austrian Grand Prix and the 28th time it had been held as a round of the Formula One World Championship.

Mercedes driver Nico Rosberg entered as the defending race winner, while his teammate, Lewis Hamilton, entered with a seventeen-point lead over him in the Drivers' Championship standings. Mercedes were leading rivals Ferrari by 105 points in the Constructors' standings.

Hamilton started from pole position, but was overtaken by Rosberg at the first corner. Rosberg held the lead for the remainder of the race, barring brief periods during pit stops, and won by over three seconds. Hamilton remained ahead of Williams driver Felipe Massa to claim the runner-up position. Ferrari driver Sebastian Vettel had been holding third position for much of the first half of the race, but a delay due to a stuck wheel nut during his pit stop dropped him into fourth place. Former World Champions Kimi Räikkönen and Fernando Alonso were eliminated on the first lap, after Räikkönen lost control of his Ferrari at the second turn and collided with Alonso. The two came to rest against the safety barrier, with Alonso's McLaren atop the Ferrari.

== Report ==
=== Background ===
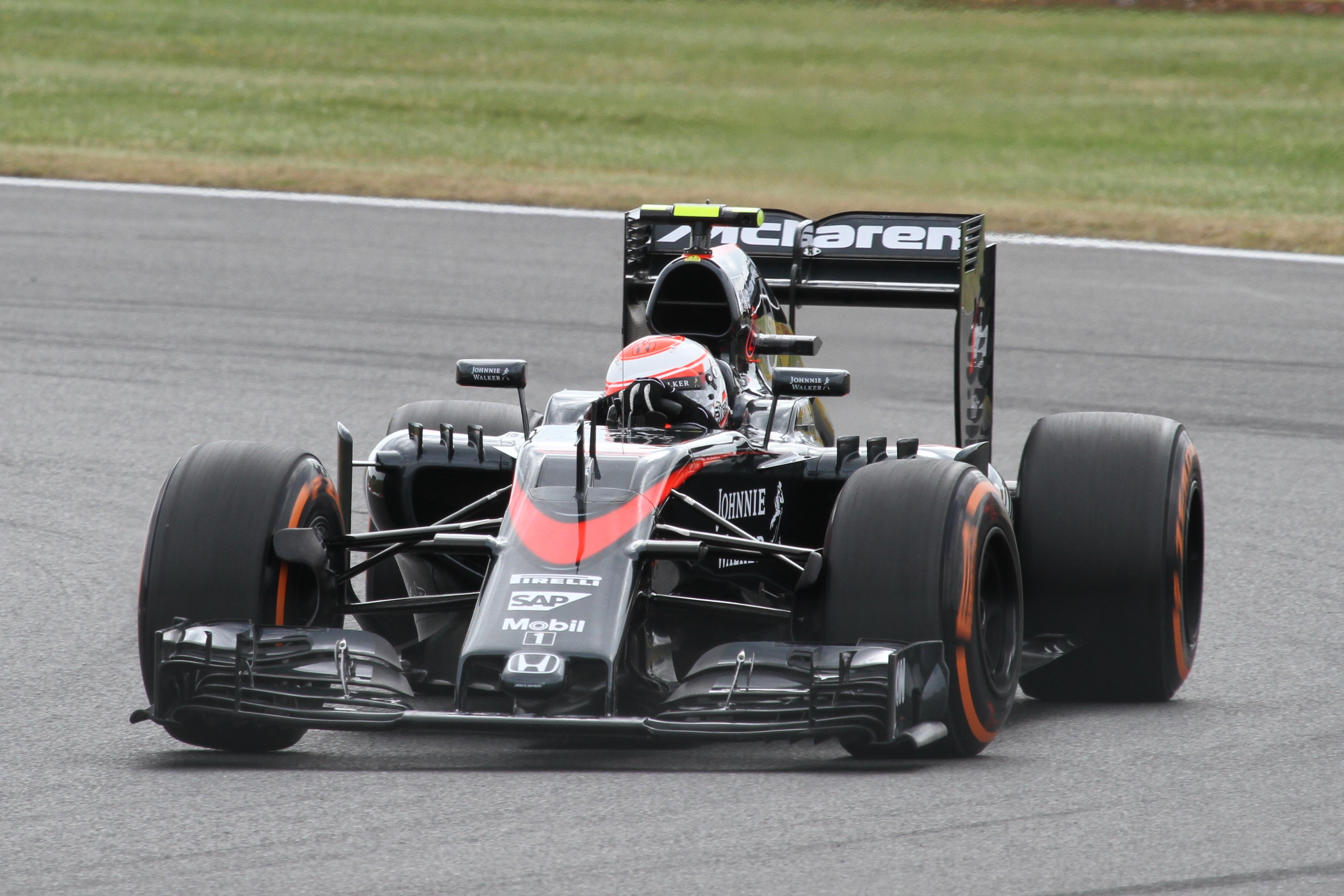
McLaren introduced a new aerodynamic package to their MP4-30, seen here driven by Jenson Button at the British Grand Prix.

Having just nine turns, the fewest on the Formula One calendar, the circuit offers very few low-speed sections and gave teams an opportunity to push their power units to their potential. As in the previous year's event, and for the third straight event overall, the yellow-banded soft compound tyre were the prime dry selection while the red-banded supersoft compound were the option dry selection. Pirelli also supplied two wet weather compounds: the green-banded intermediate compound and the blue-banded full wet compound.

Going into the race, Lewis Hamilton was leading teammate Nico Rosberg by 17 points, having won the previous race in Canada. Mercedes were leading Ferrari by more than 100 points in the Constructors' standings. After introducing an engine update at the previous round in Canada, Ferrari were considered the most likely contenders for favorites Mercedes. Several other teams introduced updates to their cars as well, including Williams and McLaren.

==== Supporting programme ====
As part of the Grand Prix programme, a Legends Parade was held before the race, with a group of eight Formula One drivers from the 1980s set to present cars, mostly from Formula One's first turbo era. Participating were local favorite Gerhard Berger (1988 Ferrari F1/87/88C), former McLaren teammates Niki Lauda (1984 McLaren MP4/2) and Alain Prost (1985 McLaren MP4/2B), Nelson Piquet (1983 Brabham BT52), Jean Alesi (1995 Sauber C14), Pierluigi Martini (1986 Minardi M186), Riccardo Patrese (1984 Renault RE50) and Christian Danner (1987 Zakspeed 871).

=== Free practice ===
Per the regulations for the 2015 season, three practice session were held, two one-and-a-half-hour sessions on Friday and another one-hour session before qualifying on Saturday. At the first session, both Mercedes drivers were fastest, with Nico Rosberg being three-tenths of a second faster than teammate Lewis Hamilton. The Ferrari of Kimi Räikkönen was the only other car to come inside one second of the Mercedes. The other Ferrari of Sebastian Vettel set the slowest lap time, as a gearbox problem prevented him from driving more than four laps. The McLaren of Fernando Alonso suffered from gearbox issues as well, but the Spaniard was able to get back on track for the later part of the session. The team had brought a new aerodynamics package to Spielberg, which was tested by Alonso in free practice, who described it as "an improvement to the car".

After his problems in the first session, Vettel was fastest in the second session on Friday afternoon. Nico Rosberg was second, about a tenth of a second behind, but did not set any timed laps in the last twenty minutes as his car was losing gearbox oil. Lewis Hamilton meanwhile struggled on the super-soft tyres, making several errors that left him fifth. Both Lotus cars made it into the top ten, with Pastor Maldonado and Romain Grosjean in fourth and seventh respectively. Max Verstappen's Toro Rosso was the fastest Renault-powered car in eighth position, while the McLarens once again had to stop their session early.

Vettel was again fastest in third practice on Saturday morning, narrowly ahead of Hamilton's Mercedes. Before all drivers were able to set times on the super-soft tyres, Fernando Alonso coming to a stop on the start/finish straight brought out a red flag, halting the session. When practice resumed, rain had started to fall, preventing the drivers from improving on their times. Only Force India driver Sergio Pérez set a lap on the faster tyre compound, ending up fourth in the session.

=== Qualifying ===
Qualifying consisted of three parts, 18, 15 and 12 minutes in length respectively, with five drivers eliminated from competing after each of the first two sessions. During the first part of qualifying (Q1), Kimi Räikkönen was eliminated due to a failure in communication, which meant he did not have enough time left for another fast lap at the end of the session. With the track still damp when qualifying began, times improved with every passing lap, with the drivers being able to switch from intermediate to slick tyres at the end of the first session. While the two Manor drivers once again qualified at the end of the grid, Jenson Button was also eliminated in Q1, leaving him with time penalties in the race, not being able to take the full extent of his 25-place grid penalty.

A dry track during Q2 saw the two Mercedes drivers fastest, Rosberg four-tenths of a second faster than Hamilton. Fernando Alonso failed to make it into Q3, the seventh time that season. He had missed the last part of qualifying seven times over the entire course of his Ferrari stint in the five previous seasons. Daniel Ricciardo was eliminated in 14th place, meaning that he - like Button - was unable to take the full extent of his ten-place grid penalty.

The top ten contested the third part of qualifying. Romain Grosjean was unable to post a lap time after having problem with his brake-by-wire system. At the beginning of the session, both Mercedes drivers set two fast laps. After the first time around, Rosberg was ahead of Hamilton, but the World Champion improved on his second lap, being two-tenths of a second faster than his teammate. During their final flying laps at the end of the session, both drivers spun on different parts of the track, Hamilton in turn one and Rosberg in the final corner, meaning the order remained, with Hamilton taking the 45th pole position of his career, drawing level with Sebastian Vettel, who qualified third. Last year's pole sitter Felipe Massa followed in fourth, while Le Mans winner Nico Hülkenberg finished fifth, ahead of the second Williams of Valtteri Bottas.

=== Race ===
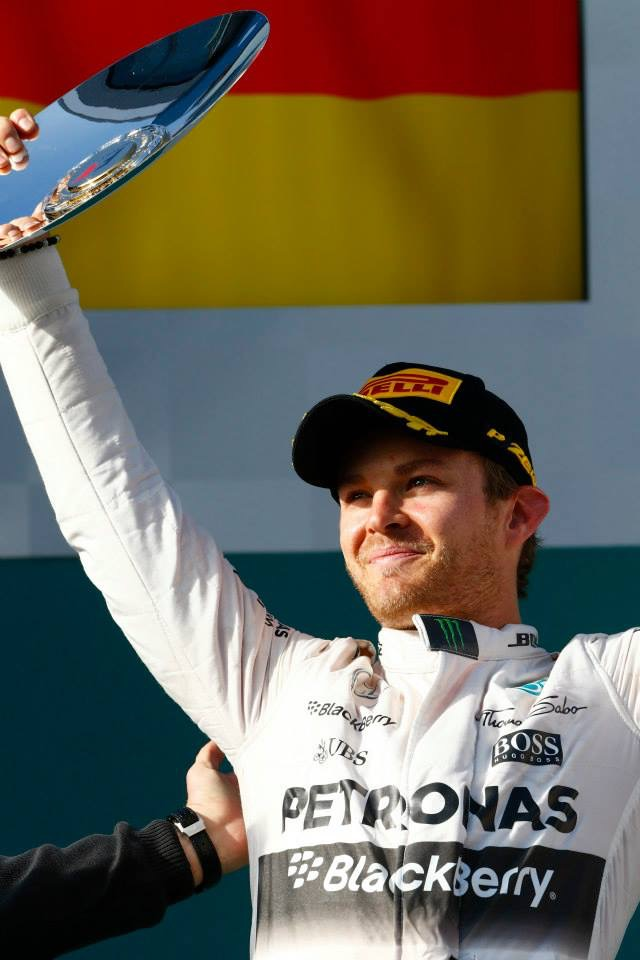
Nico Rosberg (pictured at the Australian Grand Prix) won the race after overtaking teammate Hamilton at the start.

At the start of the race, Rosberg got off the line well and overtook teammate Hamilton for the lead going into turn one. Coming out of the following turn, Kimi Räikkönen was caught out by heavy wheelspin on his harder tyre compound going side by side and swept to the outside of the track, crashing into Fernando Alonso's McLaren, who was lifted on top of the Ferrari. Both drivers were able to walk away unharmed from the incident. The collision brought out the safety car. At the end of the lap, Daniil Kvyat made a pit stop to replace a damaged front wing, while Will Stevens retired from the race with an oil leak. When the safety car came back into the pit lane on the end of lap six, Rosberg was able to defend his lead against Hamilton and quickly built a gap, leading him by 2.3 seconds by lap eleven. Lap twelve saw the second McLaren of Jenson Button retiring with an intake system sensor failure.

On lap 16, Valtteri Bottas reclaimed sixth position from Max Verstappen, a position he had lost at the start, while Hamilton started to close the gap to Rosberg in front. The German however reacted and extended his lead back to four seconds by lap 27. Meanwhile, Bottas went past Le Mans winner Nico Hülkenberg for fifth place on lap 26, but an earlier pit stop brought the German back out in front of the Williams. For speeding in the pit lane, Carlos Sainz Jr. was handed a five-second time penalty, which was not to be applied since the Spaniard retired on lap 34 due to a technical problem. Prior to the pit stops at the front of the field, Lewis Hamilton was able to reduce the gap to 2.2 seconds by lap 32. When Rosberg made a pit stop one lap later, Hamilton led the race. Having thereby led a lap in seventeen consecutive races, Hamilton equalled a 45-year-old record set by Jackie Stewart, who had led at least one lap each between the 1968 United States Grand Prix and the 1970 Belgian Grand Prix.

Hamilton made a pit stop on lap 35, coming out behind his teammate, driving over the white pit exit line in the process. This handed him a five-second time penalty to be added to his finishing time. Sebastian Vettel came in two laps later, being stationary for more than 13 seconds due to a problem with the wheelnut of his rear right tyre and came out behind Felipe Massa in fourth place. Meanwhile, Romain Grosjean retired with gearbox issues. Vettel closed the gap to Massa in the last podium position, but was eventually unable to pass the Brazilian, handing Massa his first podium finish of 2015. Toward the end of the race, Pastor Maldonado was racing Max Verstappen for seventh place. Going past the start/finish straight, Maldonado almost lost the rear of his car coming out of the Toro Rosso's slipstream, while Verstappen locked up going into turn one, handing the position to the Lotus driver. Rosberg, who complained about vibrations in his front tyres during the last laps, crossed the finish line three seconds ahead of teammate Hamilton, taking his third victory of the season and the second consecutive one at Spielberg, reducing his championship gap to ten points.

=== Post-race ===
"I have no idea, to be honest. I don't think I went over anything, so..."

— Lewis Hamilton, speaking about what caused his pit exit penalty.

At the podium interview, conducted by former racing driver Gerhard Berger, Rosberg expressed his satisfaction with the victory, saying: "The start made the race. It was a great start and I managed to defend in the first couple of corners and then I really just tried to push flat out this time. I was really happy with the car and happy to see the gap open up to Lewis, so it really worked out perfectly today." Meanwhile, Lewis Hamilton conceded that his teammate had done a "fantastic job," stating that "[a]t the end of the day, he was quicker during the race." Speaking about his start at the post-race press conference, Hamilton explained that his car suffered from a lot of wheelspin, which made him get off the line slowly. Meanwhile, third placed Felipe Massa told the press that his team had "managed to get the opportunities, which it was a mistake of another team," adding that the changes made to the car were "definitely positive."

When asked about the necessity of closed cockpits following the first lap accident between Alonso and Räikkönen, Rosberg and Massa stated that improvements to safety should be made in this area, while Hamilton said he had no opinion on the matter. Alonso stated that he was "scared" after the collision and was visibly concerned for his rival's safety upon checking on the condition of Räikkönen, and relieved that the accident left his former teammate uninjured. The race stewards decided not to take any disciplinary actions concerning the crash.

Following their battle for seventh place towards the end of the race, Pastor Maldonado accused Max Verstappen of "not respecting the rules," though he went on to concede that it was great to be allowed to race on the limits by the stewards. The Dutchman in turn stated: "It's quite funny that Pastor said that. It's the only thing I say about it, it's quite funny." After suffering from multiple problems during and race and being unable to place any of their cars in the points, Sauber team principal Monisha Kaltenborn said the team needed to recover from a "really horrifying race."

It was the fifth one-two finish for Mercedes that season and Massa's first podium appearance since Abu Dhabi the year before. The victory moved Rosberg closer to his teammate in the Drivers' Championship, now ten points behind. It was his eleventh career victory, putting him level with Jacques Villeneuve, Rubens Barrichello and third placed Felipe Massa, who became only the eighth driver in the history of the sport to achieve more than 1,000 championship points. In the Constructors' Championship, Williams extended their lead to Red Bull to 74 points, while Force India moved up to fifth after their second double-points finish of the season. In a weekend that the official Formula One website described as "a new low" for McLaren, Fernando Alonso retired from the fourth consecutive race, something that had never happened to him in his career.

== Classification ==
=== Qualifying ===
| Pos. | Car no. | Driver | Constructor | Qualifying times | | | Final grid |
| Pos. | Car no. | Driver | Constructor | Q1 | Q2 | Q3 | Final grid |
|---|---|---|---|---|---|---|---|
| 1 | 44 | (United Kingdom) Lewis Hamilton | Mercedes | 1:12.218 | 1:09.062 | 1:08.455 | 1 |
| 2 | 6 | (Germany) Nico Rosberg | Mercedes | 1:10.976 | 1:08.634 | 1:08.655 | 2 |
| 3 | 5 | (Germany) Sebastian Vettel | Ferrari | 1:11.184 | 1:09.392 | 1:08.810 | 3 |
| 4 | 19 | (Brazil) Felipe Massa | Williams-Mercedes | 1:11.830 | 1:09.719 | 1:09.192 | 4 |
| 5 | 27 | (Germany) Nico Hülkenberg | Force India-Mercedes | 1:11.319 | 1:09.604 | 1:09.278 | 5 |
| 6 | 77 | (Finland) Valtteri Bottas | Williams-Mercedes | 1:11.894 | 1:09.598 | 1:09.319 | 6 |
| 7 | 33 | (Netherlands) Max Verstappen | Toro Rosso-Renault | 1:11.307 | 1:09.631 | 1:09.612 | 7 |
| 8 | 26 | (Russia) Daniil Kvyat | Red Bull Racing-Renault | 1:12.092 | 1:10.187 | 1:09.694 | 15^{1} |
| 9 | 12 | (Brazil) Felipe Nasr | Sauber-Ferrari | 1:12.001 | 1:09.652 | 1:09.713 | 8 |
| 10 | 8 | (France) Romain Grosjean | Lotus-Mercedes | 1:11.821 | 1:09.920 | no time | 9 |
| 11 | 13 | (Venezuela) Pastor Maldonado | Lotus-Mercedes | 1:11.661 | 1:10.374 | | 10 |
| 12 | 9 | (Sweden) Marcus Ericsson | Sauber-Ferrari | 1:12.388 | 1:10.426 | | 11 |
| 13 | 55 | (Spain) Carlos Sainz Jr. | Toro Rosso-Renault | 1:11.158 | 1:10.465 | | 12 |
| 14 | 3 | (Australia) Daniel Ricciardo | Red Bull Racing-Renault | 1:11.973 | 1:10.482 | | 18^{2} |
| 15 | 14 | (Spain) Fernando Alonso | McLaren-Honda | 1:12.508 | 1:10.736 | | 19^{3} |
| 16 | 11 | (Mexico) Sergio Pérez | Force India-Mercedes | 1:12.522 | | | 13 |
| 17 | 22 | (United Kingdom) Jenson Button | McLaren-Honda | 1:12.632 | | | 20^{4} |
| 18 | 7 | (Finland) Kimi Räikkönen | Ferrari | 1:12.867 | | | 14 |
| 19 | 98 | (Spain) Roberto Merhi | Marussia-Ferrari | 1:14.071 | | | 16 |
| 20 | 28 | (United Kingdom) Will Stevens | Marussia-Ferrari | 1:15.368 | | | 17 |
107% time: 1:15.944

Notes

- ^1 – Daniil Kvyat received a ten-place grid penalty for exceeding the allowed internal combustion engine allocation.
- ^2 – Daniel Ricciardo received a ten-place grid penalty for exceeding the allowed internal combustion engine allocation.
- ^3 – Fernando Alonso received a ten- and two five-place grid penalties for exceeding the allowed allocation of three of his power unit components, as well as a five-place grid penalty for an unauthorized gearbox change.
- ^4 – Jenson Button received a ten- and three five-place grid penalties for exceeding the allowed allocation of four of his power unit components.

=== Race ===
| Pos. | No. | Driver | Constructor | Laps | Time/Retired | Grid | Points |
|---|---|---|---|---|---|---|---|
| 1 | 6 | (Germany) Nico Rosberg | Mercedes | 71 | 1:30:16.930 | 2 | 25 |
| 2 | 44 | (United Kingdom) Lewis Hamilton | Mercedes | 71 | +8.800^{1} | 1 | 18 |
| 3 | 19 | (Brazil) Felipe Massa | Williams-Mercedes | 71 | +17.573 | 4 | 15 |
| 4 | 5 | (Germany) Sebastian Vettel | Ferrari | 71 | +18.181 | 3 | 12 |
| 5 | 77 | (Finland) Valtteri Bottas | Williams-Mercedes | 71 | +53.604 | 6 | 10 |
| 6 | 27 | (Germany) Nico Hülkenberg | Force India-Mercedes | 71 | +1:04.075 | 5 | 8 |
| 7 | 13 | (Venezuela) Pastor Maldonado | Lotus-Mercedes | 70 | +1 Lap | 10 | 6 |
| 8 | 33 | (Netherlands) Max Verstappen | Toro Rosso-Renault | 70 | +1 Lap | 7 | 4 |
| 9 | 11 | (Mexico) Sergio Pérez | Force India-Mercedes | 70 | +1 Lap | 13 | 2 |
| 10 | 3 | (Australia) Daniel Ricciardo | Red Bull Racing-Renault | 70 | +1 Lap | 18 | 1 |
| 11 | 12 | (Brazil) Felipe Nasr | Sauber-Ferrari | 70 | +1 Lap | 8 | |
| 12 | 26 | (Russia) Daniil Kvyat | Red Bull Racing-Renault | 70 | +1 Lap | 15 | |
| 13 | 9 | (Sweden) Marcus Ericsson | Sauber-Ferrari | 69 | +2 Laps | 11 | |
| 14 | 98 | (Spain) Roberto Merhi | Marussia-Ferrari | 68 | +3 Laps | 16 | |
| Ret | 8 | (France) Romain Grosjean | Lotus-Mercedes | 35 | Gearbox | 9 | |
| Ret | 55 | (Spain) Carlos Sainz Jr.^{2} | Toro Rosso-Renault | 35 | Electrical | 12 | |
| Ret | 22 | (United Kingdom) Jenson Button | McLaren-Honda | 7 | Electrical | 20 | |
| Ret | 28 | (United Kingdom) Will Stevens | Marussia-Ferrari | 1 | Oil leak | 17 | |
| Ret | 7 | (Finland) Kimi Räikkönen | Ferrari | 0 | Collision | 14 | |
| Ret | 14 | (Spain) Fernando Alonso | McLaren-Honda | 0 | Collision | 19 | |

Notes

- ^1 – Lewis Hamilton received a 5-second time penalty for crossing the white line on pit exit. His final position was not affected as he finished over 10s ahead of P3.
- ^2 – Carlos Sainz Jr. received a 5-second time penalty for speeding in the pit-lane. His final position was not affected because he retired from the race.

== Championship standings after the race ==
Drivers' Championship standings

| Pos. | Driver | Points |
|---|---|---|
| 1 | (United Kingdom) Lewis Hamilton | 169 |
| 2 | (Germany) Nico Rosberg | 159 |
| 3 | (Germany) Sebastian Vettel | 120 |
| 4 | (Finland) Kimi Räikkönen | 72 |
| 5 | (Finland) Valtteri Bottas | 67 |

Constructors' Championship standings

| | Pos. | Constructor | Points |
|---|---|---|---|
| | 1 | (Germany) Mercedes | 328 |
| | 2 | (Italy) Ferrari | 192 |
| | 3 | (United Kingdom) Williams-Mercedes | 129 |
| | 4 | (Austria) Red Bull Racing-Renault | 55 |
| 1 | 5 | Force India-Mercedes | 31 |

- Note: Only the top five positions are included for both sets of standings.

== See also ==
- 2015 Red Bull Ring GP2 Series round
- 2015 Red Bull Ring GP3 Series round
- 2015 Graz car attack, terrorist attack at a venue hosting a Grand Prix watch party

| Previous race: 2015 Canadian Grand Prix | FIA Formula One World Championship; 2015 season | Next race: 2015 British Grand Prix |
| Previous race: 2014 Austrian Grand Prix | Austrian Grand Prix | Next race: 2016 Austrian Grand Prix |
