= Force India VJM07 =

2014 Formula One racing car

- Nico Hülkenberg driving the VJM07 in the British Grand Prix
- Category: Formula One
- Constructor: Force India
- Designers: Andrew Green (Technical Director); Simon Phillips (Aerodynamics Director); Akio Haga (Chief Designer); Bruce Eddington (Head of Design, Composites); Daniel Carpenter (Head of Design, Mechanical); Andrew Brown (Head of R&D); Jonathan Marshall (Head of Vehicle Science); Simon Belcher (Chief Aerodynamicist)
- Predecessor: Force India VJM06
- Successor: Force India VJM08

Technical specifications
- Chassis: Carbon fibre composite monocoque with Zylon legality side anti-intrusion panels.
- Suspension (front): Aluminium uprights with carbon fibre composite wishbones, trackrod and pushrod. Inboard chassis mounted torsion springs, dampers and anti-roll bar assembly.
- Suspension (rear): Aluminium uprights with carbon fibre composite wishbones, trackrod and pullrod. Inboard gearbox mounted torsion springs, dampers and anti-roll bar assembly.
- Engine: Mercedes PU106A Hybrid Turbo 1.6 L (98 cu in) V6 (90°), 15,000 RPM limited , in a mid-mounted, rear-wheel drive layout
- Electric motor: Mercedes PU106A Hybrid Motor Generator Unit–Kinetic (MGU-K) Mercedes PU106A Hybrid Motor Generator Unit–Heat (MGU-H)
- Transmission: Semi-automatic Sequential Gearbox Eight Speed Forward + One reverse
- Weight: 691 kg (1,523 lb) (with driver)
- Fuel: Petronas
- Lubricants: Roshfrans
- Tyres: Pirelli P Zero (dry), Cinturato (wet)

Competition history
- Notable entrants: Sahara Force India F1 Team
- Notable drivers: 11. (Mexico) Sergio Pérez; 27. (Germany) Nico Hülkenberg
- Debut: 2014 Australian Grand Prix
- Last event: 2014 Abu Dhabi Grand Prix
Races	Wins	Podiums	Poles	F/Laps
19	0	1	0	1

The Force India VJM07 is a Formula One racing car designed by Force India to compete in the 2014 Formula One season. It was driven by Nico Hülkenberg, who returned to the team after racing for Sauber in 2013, and Sergio Pérez, who joined the team after leaving McLaren. The VJM07 was designed to use Mercedes' new 1.6-litre V6 turbocharged engine, the PU106A Hybrid as well as Petronas fuels.

== History ==
A rendered image of the VJM07 was released on Twitter on 23 January, making it the first 2014 Formula One design to be revealed to public.

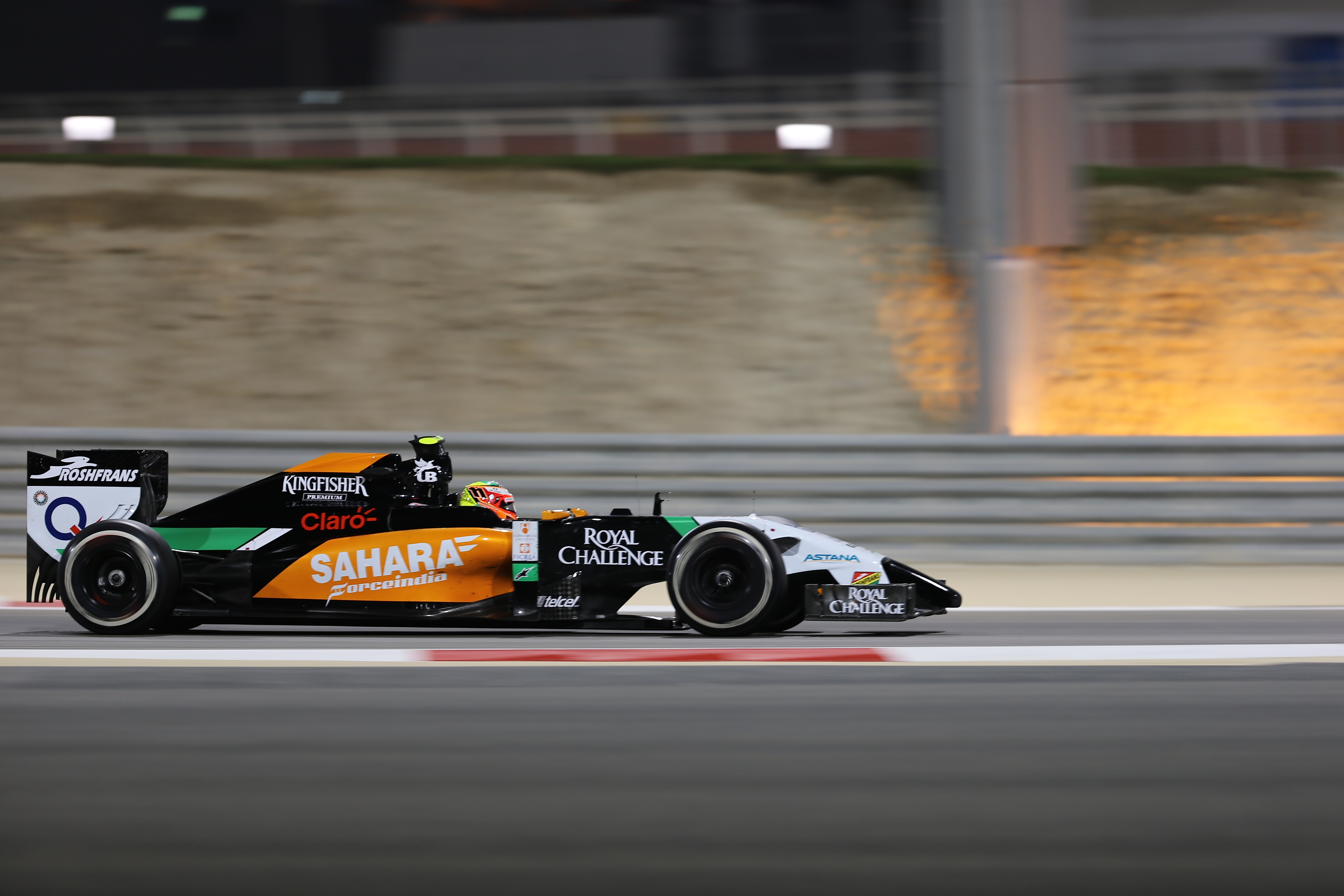
Pérez took third at the Bahrain Grand Prix, taking the team's first podium finish since the 2009 Belgian Grand Prix

At the Bahrain Grand Prix, the car scored the team's greatest points haul from a single race as Pérez finished third (Force India's first podium in over four years) and Hülkenberg finished fifth. The team ultimately finished the season sixth in the Constructors' Championship.

The car performed very well in the early races with the team consistently scoring well. The team nearly got a podium in the Canadian Grand Prix but driver Sergio Pérez was involved in a huge crash with Williams' Felipe Massa two laps from the end. Due to the financial limitations of the team, the car could not be developed like the leading teams' cars and the pace dropped off towards the end of the season.

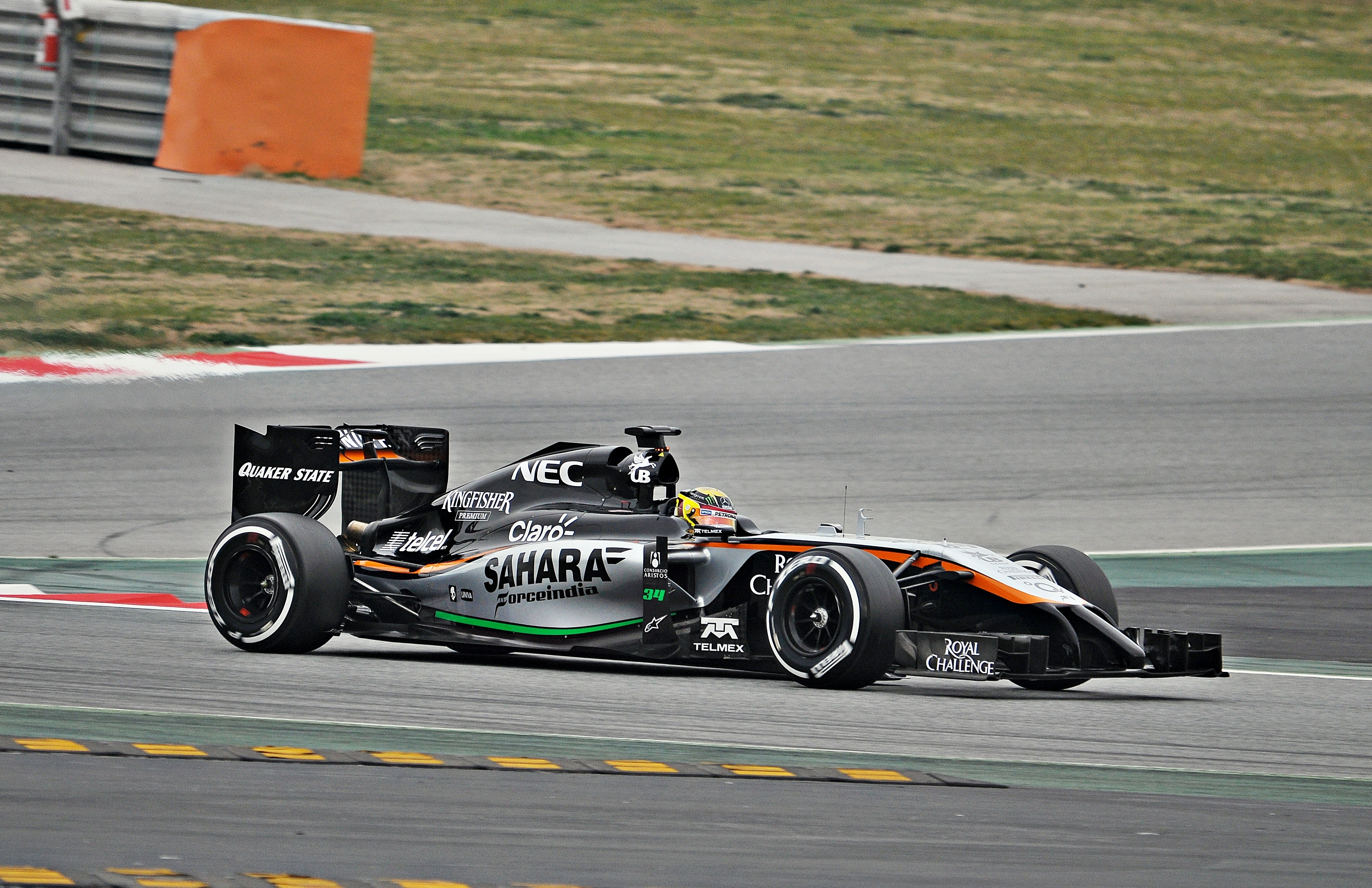
Pascal Wehrlein driving a relivered VJM07 at pre-season testing for the 2015 season

After Force India failed to get their new car, the Force India VJM08 ready in time for pre-season testing at the beginning of 2015, the VJM07 was used at the second test in Barcelona, although in the 2015 livery. This allowed the team to gain data on the new tyre compounds and degradation.

== Sponsorship and livery ==
The Force India VJM07 was painted in the Indian flag colors of orange, white and green, but compared to the previous model, large parts of the white paint were now black. Starting from the Spanish Grand Prix, following a sponsorship agreement with the Russian company producing Smirnoff vodka, black took on greater importance in the livery, occupying the entire sides of the car.

== Complete Formula One results ==
(key) (results in italics indicate fastest lap)

Year	Entrant	Engine	Tyres	Drivers	Grands Prix																			Points	WCC
Year	Entrant	Engine	Tyres	Drivers	AUS	MAL	BHR	CHN	ESP	MON	CAN	AUT	GBR	GER	HUN	BEL	ITA	SIN	JPN	RUS	USA	BRA	ABU‡	Points	WCC
2014	Sahara Force India F1 Team	Mercedes PU106A Hybrid	P	Sergio Pérez	10	DNS	3	9	9	Ret	11†	6	11	10	Ret	8	7	7	10	10	Ret	15	7	155	6th
2014	Sahara Force India F1 Team	Mercedes PU106A Hybrid	P	Nico Hülkenberg	6	5	5	6	10	5	5	9	8	7	Ret	10	12	9	8	12	Ret	8	6	155	6th

† — Driver failed to finish the race, but was classified as they had completed greater than 90% of the race distance.
‡ — Teams and drivers scored double points at the Abu Dhabi Grand Prix
