= 2015 British Grand Prix =

Race 9 of 19 in the 2015 Formula One World Championship
← Previous race	Next race →
- Layout of the Silverstone Circuit

Race details
- Date: 5 July 2015
- Official name: 2015 Formula 1 British Grand Prix
- Location: Silverstone Circuit; Silverstone, United Kingdom
- Course: Permanent racing facility
- Course length: 5.891 km (3.661 miles)
- Distance: 52 laps, 306.198 km (190.263 miles)
- Weather: Cloudy, rain at times 17–20 °C (63–68 °F) air temperature 24–32 °C (75–90 °F) track temperature 2.5 m/s (8.2 ft/s) wind from the east
- Attendance: 350,000 (Weekend) 140,000 (Race Day)

Pole position
Driver	(United Kingdom) Lewis Hamilton	Mercedes
- Time: 1:32.248

Fastest lap
Driver	(United Kingdom) Lewis Hamilton	Mercedes
- Time: 1:37.093 on lap 29

Podium
First	(United Kingdom) Lewis Hamilton	Mercedes
Second	(Germany) Nico Rosberg	Mercedes
Third	(Germany) Sebastian Vettel	Ferrari

The 2015 British Grand Prix (formally known as the 2015 Formula 1 British Grand Prix) was a Formula One motor race that took place on 5 July 2015 at the Silverstone Circuit in Silverstone, United Kingdom. The race was the ninth round of the 2015 season, and marked the 70th running of the British Grand Prix, and the 51st time that the race was held at the Silverstone Circuit.

Lewis Hamilton was the defending race winner, and came into the event with a ten-point lead over teammate Nico Rosberg in the World Drivers' Championship. In the Constructors' Championship, Mercedes were leading Ferrari by 136 points, with Williams a further 63 points adrift.

Hamilton took pole position during Saturday's qualifying, his eighth of the season, ahead of Rosberg and the two Williams of Felipe Massa and Valtteri Bottas. The first lap of the race saw the Massa and Bottas take first and second place respectively through fast starts. They were able to hold their positions until the pit stops. Rain in the latter part of the race gave Sebastian Vettel the chance to overtake the two Williams for the last podium position. Hamilton won the race for the second consecutive year, 11 seconds ahead of his teammate, extending his championship lead to 17 points.

== Report ==
=== Background ===
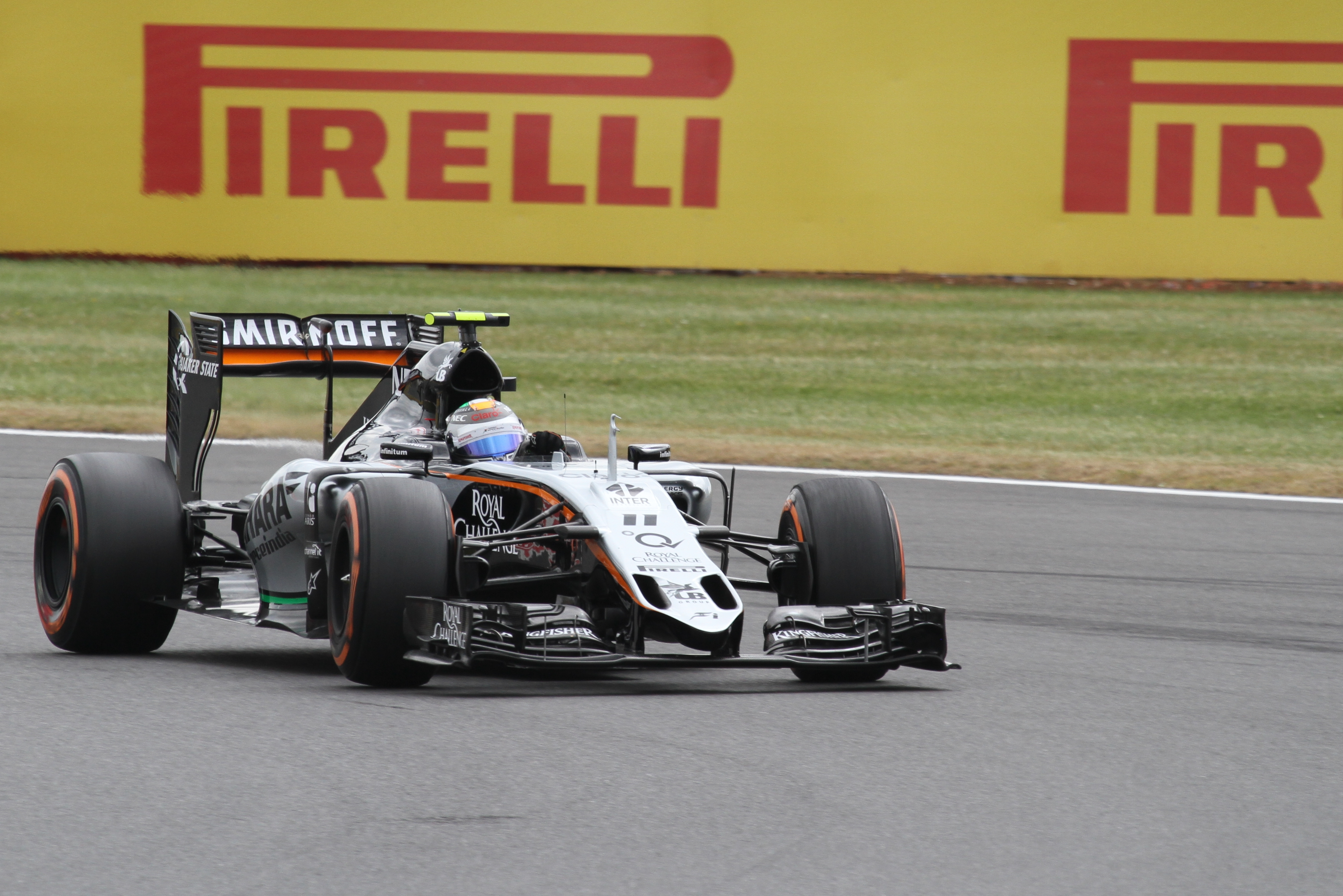
Sergio Pérez driving the newly introduced Force India VJM08B.

Coming to Silverstone, Force India introduced a new version (B-spec) of their VJM08, featuring a shorter nose with "nostrils". After a problem with a wheelnut had caused problems for Sebastian Vettel at the previous race in Austria, Ferrari chose to revise its wheelnut system for the British Grand Prix. Manor Marussia secured new sponsorship ahead of the race, thus changing its livery. The race marked the 900th Grand Prix contested by at least one car using a Ferrari engine.

Pirelli nominated their two hardest dry-weather compounds for the event; the white-banded medium tyre as the option selection, while the orange-banded hard tyre would be the prime compound. The company also supplied their two wet-weather tyres, as they do for all events; the green-banded intermediate tyre and the blue-banded full wet tyre.

Silverstone was used in its revised 2011 Arena Grand Prix layout, which has been described as "one of the fastest circuits in the F1 calendar". The "fast, flowing circuit" featured 18 turns, with Stowe and Vale corners being the best overtaking opportunities.

Lewis Hamilton came into the weekend with a ten-point lead over teammate Nico Rosberg in the World Drivers' Championship, after Rosberg took victory in Austria. In the World Constructors' Championship, Mercedes led Ferrari by 136 points, while third placed Williams had moved closer to Ferrari in Austria. The race stewards for the weekend were FIA World Council member Lars Österlind, President of the Barbados Motoring Federation Andrew Mallalieu and 1992 world champion Nigel Mansell.

=== Free practice ===
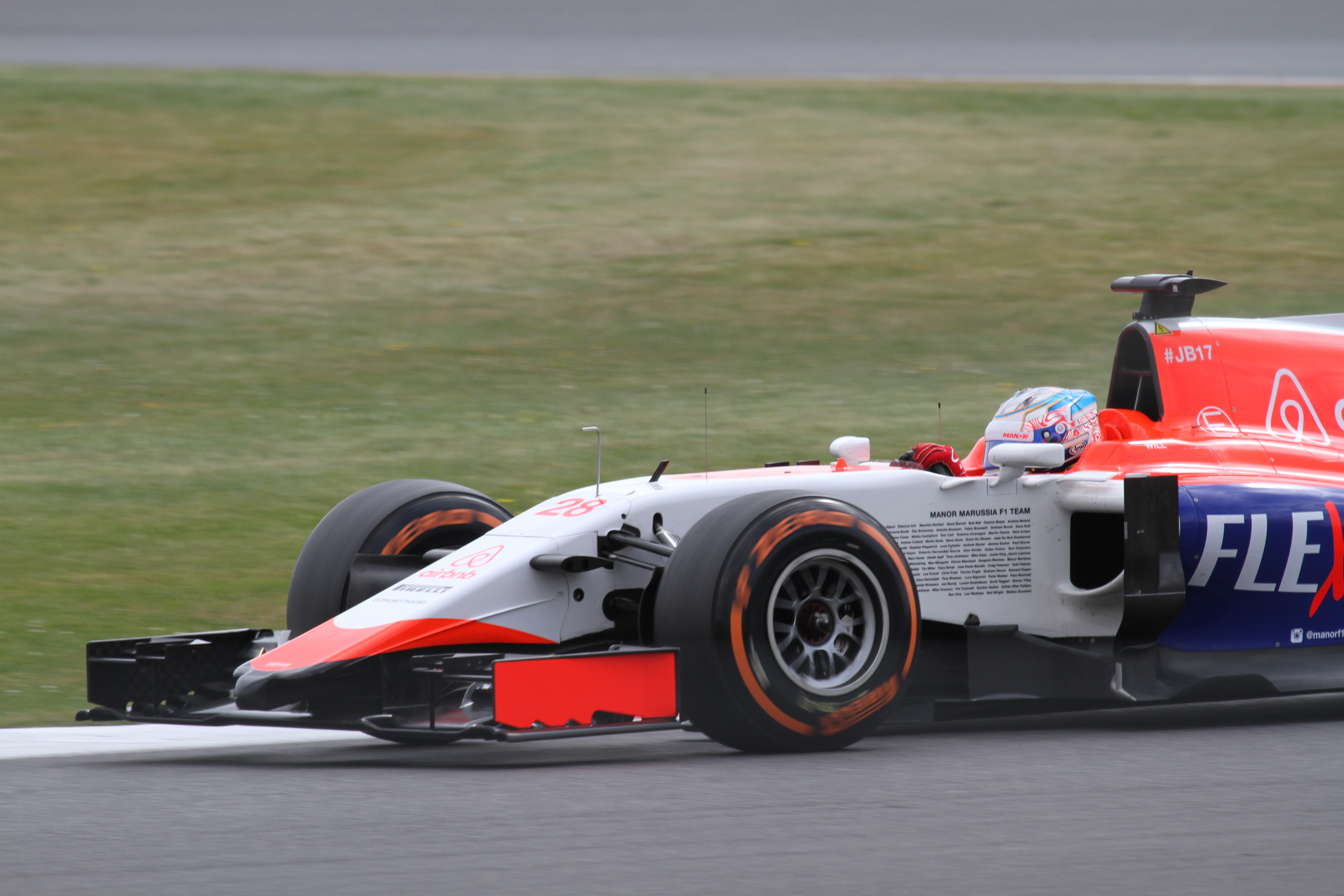
Will Stevens driving the reliveried Marussia MR03B

Per the regulations for the 2015 season, three practice sessions were held, two one and a half-hour sessions on Friday and another one-hour session before qualifying on Saturday. In the first practice session on Friday morning, Nico Rosberg posted the fastest time, after recovering from early hydraulic problems that forced his team to exchange his gearbox. Rosberg was eventually 0.07 seconds quicker than teammate Lewis Hamilton. Max Verstappen was 1.2 seconds down on Rosberg in third, proving the Toro Rosso chassis was competitive for the weekend. Taking part in first practice were test drivers Jolyon Palmer, replacing Romain Grosjean at Lotus, Susie Wolff in Valtteri Bottas' Williams FW37, and Raffaele Marciello for Sauber instead of Marcus Ericsson.

The second session on Friday afternoon was red-flagged early on when Romain Grosjean got stuck in a gravel trap at Luffield corner. Nico Rosberg was once again fastest ahead of the two Ferrari drivers and teammate Hamilton, who complained about the setup of his car. McLaren and Sauber endured difficult sessions, finishing only ahead of the two Manor Marussia cars. It was Manor Marussia driver Roberto Merhi who brought out a second red flag, when his car beached at the same spot that had caught out Grosjean earlier. After the Williams drivers only finished tenth and twelfth, Felipe Massa stated that his team was behind Red Bull.

In the third and final practice session, held on Saturday morning, World Champion Lewis Hamilton set the fastest time, half a second ahead of his teammate, who spent the better part of the session in the garage while his team investigated a possible gearbox oil leak. Behind the Mercedes cars were the two Ferraris and the two Toro Rossos, with only Kimi Räikkönen coming within a second of Hamilton's time. Meanwhile, Fernando Alonso was confined to only six laps, ending his session early.

=== Qualifying ===
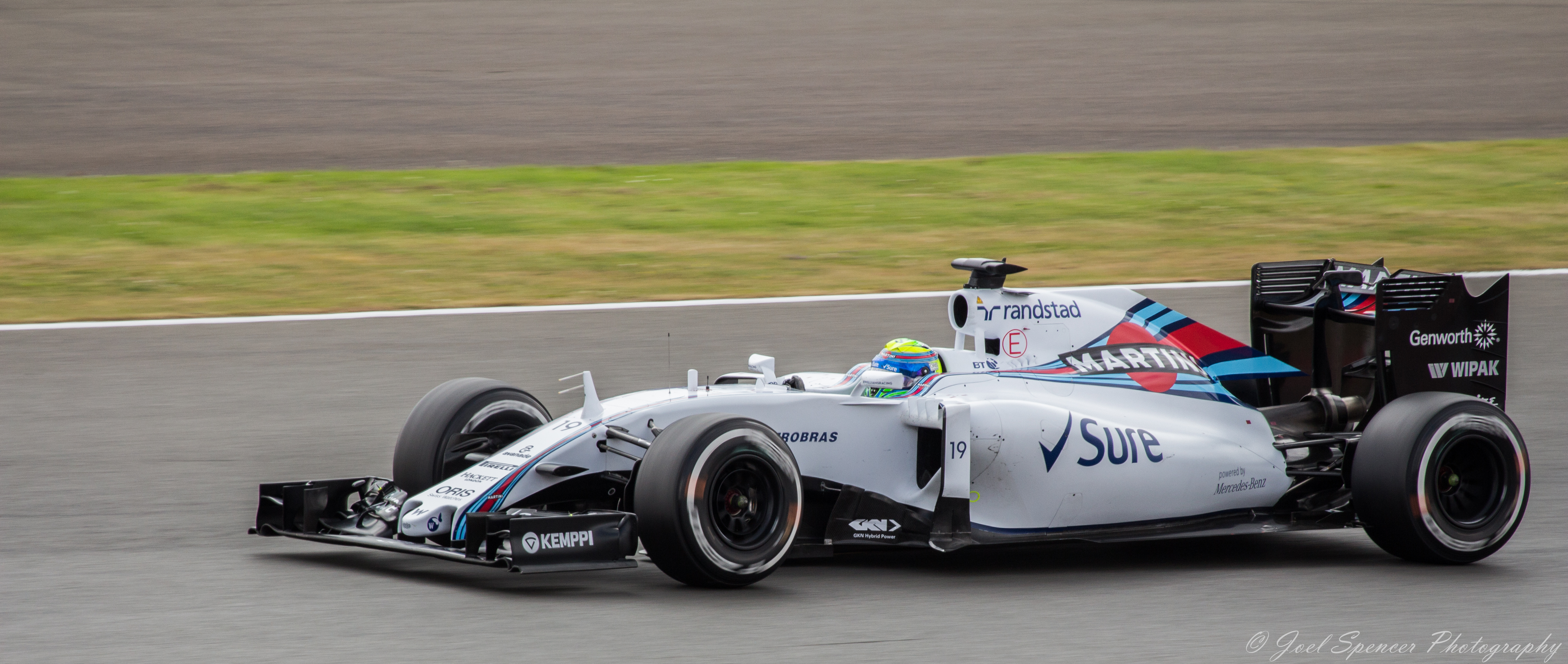
Felipe Massa qualified third and would go on to lead the first part of the race.

Qualifying consisted of three parts, 18, 15 and 12 minutes in length respectively, with five drivers eliminated from competing after each of the first two sessions. Before qualifying began, race directors warned the drivers to respect track limits, especially at Copse corner. Still, eleven drivers ultimately had times disallowed for leaving the track with all four wheels in the corner over the course of qualifying. Pastor Maldonado lost two of his lap times, including his best in Q1, and barely made it into Q2. This came at the expense of the two McLaren drivers, the two Manor Marussia cars and Sauber's Felipe Nasr, who all failed to proceed into the second part. Meanwhile, Kimi Räikkönen was fastest during the session.

The second part of qualifying (Q2) saw both Lotus drivers eliminated, as well as Max Verstappen who complained about lack of rear grip. Sergio Pérez qualified eleventh while Grosjean in 12th had his best time disallowed for exceeding the track limits. However, his second best time proved sufficient to keep his position.

Q3 saw the top-ten drivers compete for pole position, which eventually went to Lewis Hamilton, beating teammate Rosberg by 0.113 seconds. Both Mercedes drivers were unable to improve on their first times set in the session, with Hamilton aborting his run and returning to the pit lane before the session was over. After securing two podium finishes in the past two races, Williams confirmed their improved form and took the second row on the grid, Massa ahead of Bottas. It was the twentieth consecutive pole position for Mercedes, being four races shy of a record set by Williams in 1992–1993.

=== Race ===
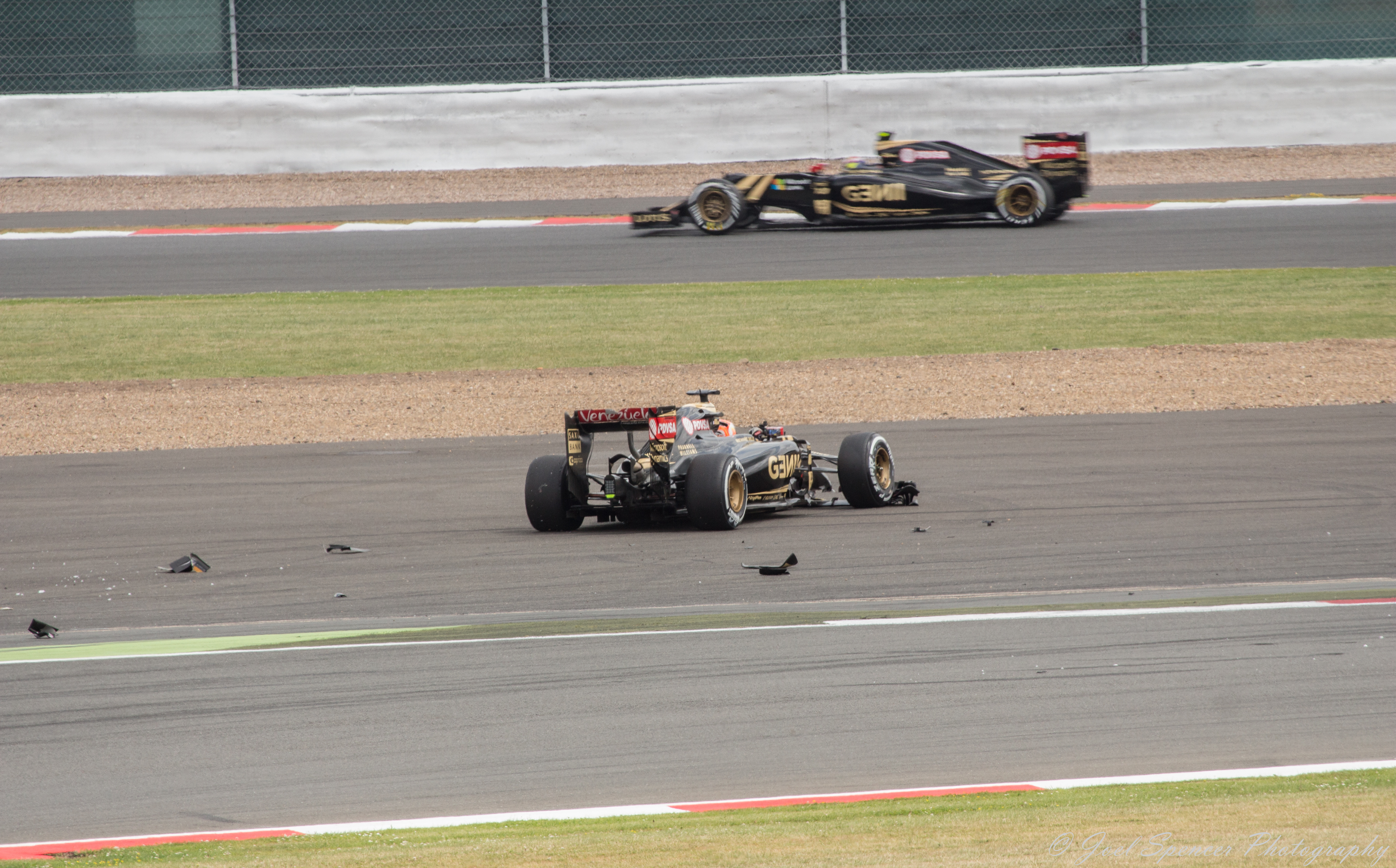
After colliding with each other on the opening lap, both Lotus drivers retired.

The sell-out race on Sunday was held in front of a crowd of 140,000. On the way to the grid, Felipe Nasr experienced gearbox issues and had to retire. After the lights went out, both Mercedes cars did not get away well, allowing the two Williams cars of Massa and Bottas to move into first and third respectively, with Bottas almost getting the better of Lewis Hamilton. Further back, Nico Hülkenberg was quick off the line as well, jumping from ninth to fifth at the expense of Daniil Kvyat and the two Ferraris. At the back of the grid, Daniel Ricciardo touched Romain Grosjean into Turn 3, causing Grosjean to turn into his teammate Pastor Maldonado. Fernando Alonso, who had to turn away to avoid the accident, collided with teammate Jenson Button, who along with both Lotus drivers had to retire. While Alonso made a pit stop for a new nose, the incident brought out the safety car, which led the field until the start of lap four. Hamilton immediately attacked Felipe Massa, only to run wide on Vale, allowing Bottas to take second place on the inside of Club. Meanwhile, Sergio Pérez overtook Sebastian Vettel for ninth, while Max Verstappen retired after a spin in the gravel.

Over the next couple of laps, Williams exercised team orders, and told their drivers to avoid racing each other to pull away from the Mercedes cars. Bottas complained that he was faster and requested permission to overtake for the lead, which Williams granted. His pace did not improve, however, but the top four pulled away from the midfield, leading Nico Hülkenberg in fifth by seven seconds on lap 13. Both Ferrari drivers made a pit stop for new tyres early, on laps 14 and 15, apparently set for a two-stop strategy. On lap 20, Lewis Hamilton opted for the undercut, coming in for a new set of tyres. Massa, then in the lead, and Rosberg, in fourth place came in a lap later. On exit, both fought on the pit lane wheel to wheel, but Massa's lead proved sufficient for provisional second. Bottas came in a lap later, but Hamilton's out-lap, the fastest of the race, saw the world champion take the lead, with Bottas in third; splitting Massa and Rosberg. Daniel Ricciardo retired with an electrical failure on lap 23.

By the halfway point, the drivers were told that rain was expected before the end of the race. When Carlos Sainz Jr. lost speed and retired on track due to an electrical failure, the race saw a brief Virtual Safety Car period on laps 33 and 34, after which the first drops of rain hit the circuit, initially hitting the area around the pit lane. By lap 38, drivers started to lose traction. Sebastian Vettel managed to overtake teammate Räikkönen on lap 39, with Räikkönen making a pit stop for intermediate tyres at the end of the lap, which proved to be a poor choice as the track was not wet enough yet. Meanwhile, Rosberg took third from Bottas on the same lap, and took second from Massa two laps later. Räikkönen lost additional places and dropped down to ninth on his intermediate tyres. Rosberg, on the slicks, pushed hard and significantly reduced Hamilton's lead, only 3.7 seconds behind by lap 43. In response Hamilton made a pit stop for intermediate tyres himself, which Vettel imitated. The strategy proved effective, as the rain came on just then, with Rosberg and both Williams cars dashing into the pit lane in the subsequent laps, but the stops proved too late as Massa and Bottas fell behind Vettel, with Hamilton managing to improve his lead to nine seconds over Rosberg.

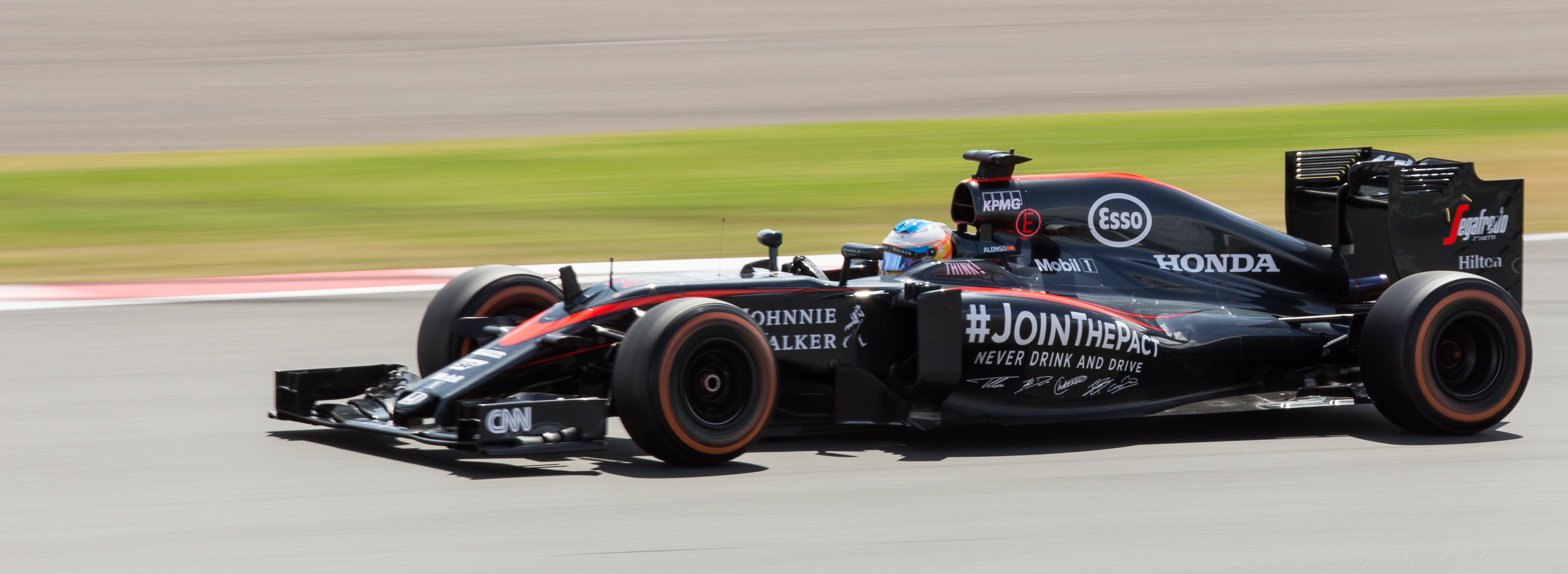
Fernando Alonso scored his first point of the season and first since returning to McLaren.

On lap 49, Will Stevens went wide into the barriers, losing his front wing. He was able to continue, but the subsequent nose change demoted him to last place. Hamilton held on to his lead over the last couple of laps, winning at Silverstone for the third time (the last two being consecutive British Grand Prix wins and the first from pole by any driver, since 1994). In doing so, he also surpassed Jackie Stewart's 45-year-old record of laps led in eighteen consecutive Grands Prix. Alonso finished tenth to earn his first point since his return to McLaren, while the new B-spec Force India recorded a double-point finish with Hülkenberg and Pérez in seventh and ninth respectively.

=== Post-race ===
"What a great race! A classic British Grand Prix which had a bit of everything. In particular, the changeable conditions kept us all on the edge of our seats, with the intensity of the rain being very difficult to read."

— John Booth, Team Principal of Manor Marussia.

Media reception of the race was good, with different sources calling it a "thriller" and "a transfusion of fresh blood for the much-criticised sport." Hamilton's performance in particular was deemed "brilliant." The world champion admitted that Mercedes losing their places at the start "made the race for the fans" and went on to say: "You can't imagine how happy I am. I was tearing up on the last lap."

Following the early lap fight for the lead with teammate Massa, Valtteri Bottas stated that he was sure he could have pulled a gap to the Mercedes behind. However, he insisted that "No one should let anyone by. That's not racing, but it would have been nice to have been able to race when I had the best opportunities." Red Bull's team principal Christian Horner declared after the race that a spin on a damp track had allegedly cost Daniil Kvyat the chance to challenge for a podium position. Following the race, the stewards decided not to take any action regarding the first-lap incident between the Lotus and McLaren drivers.

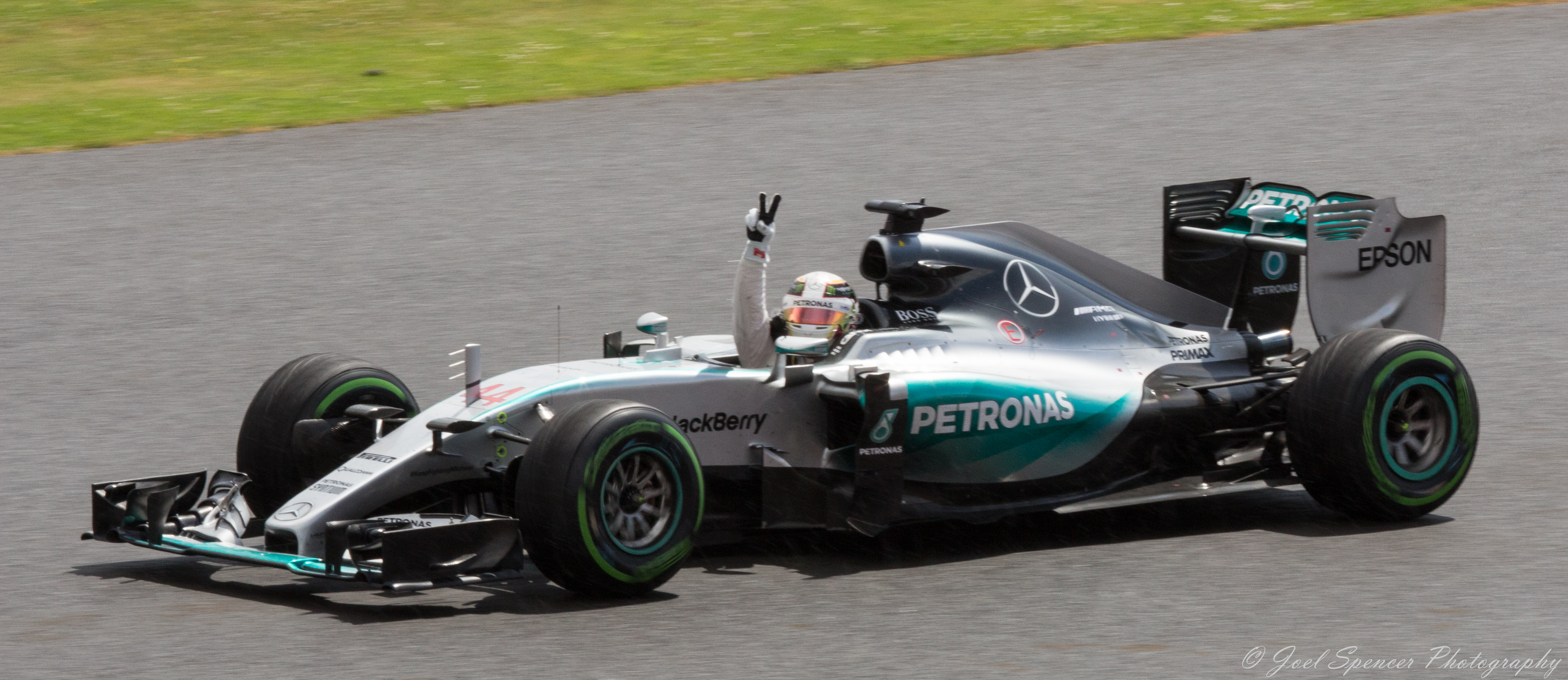
Lewis Hamilton celebrating his third home Grand Prix win

The victory allowed Hamilton to extend his championship lead over Rosberg to 17 points. He also broke the record by leading at least one lap in 18 consecutive races. By placing two drivers on the podium for the ninth time in a row, Mercedes equalled a record set by Ferrari over the course of the 1952–1953 seasons, albeit whilst often racing with more than two cars.

A day after the race, a small controversy surfaced in the media in relation to the Mercedes team allegedly breaking the rules by causing its mechanics to rush to the pit lane on lap 14, for a stop that never eventuated. Stirred by text messages from Susie Wolff to her husband, Mercedes motorsport boss Toto Wolff, the latter publicly conceded that the incident was "a bit of a game" that failed to cause Williams to call its cars in the pit lane early. While no sanctions followed, FIA Race Director Charlie Whiting responded by deciding to warn all teams against this practice at the subsequent Hungarian Grand Prix.

== Classification ==
=== Qualifying ===
Pos.	Car no.	Driver	Constructor	Qualifying times			Final grid
Pos.	Car no.	Driver	Constructor	Q1	Q2	Q3	Final grid
1	44	(United Kingdom) Lewis Hamilton	Mercedes	1:33.796	1:33.068	1:32.248	1
2	6	(Germany) Nico Rosberg	Mercedes	1:33.475	1:32.737	1:32.361	2
3	19	(Brazil) Felipe Massa	Williams-Mercedes	1:34.542	1:33.707	1:33.085	3
4	77	(Finland) Valtteri Bottas	Williams-Mercedes	1:34.171	1:33.020	1:33.149	4
5	7	(Finland) Kimi Räikkönen	Ferrari	1:33.426	1:33.911	1:33.379	5
6	5	(Germany) Sebastian Vettel	Ferrari	1:33.562	1:33.641	1:33.547	6
7	26	(Russia) Daniil Kvyat	Red Bull Racing-Renault	1:34.422	1:33.520	1:33.636	7
8	55	(Spain) Carlos Sainz Jr.	Toro Rosso-Renault	1:34.641	1:34.071	1:33.649	8
9	27	(Germany) Nico Hülkenberg	Force India-Mercedes	1:34.594	1:33.693	1:33.673	9
10	3	(Australia) Daniel Ricciardo	Red Bull Racing-Renault	1:34.272	1:33.749	1:33.943	10
11	11	(Mexico) Sergio Pérez	Force India-Mercedes	1:34.250	1:34.268		11
12	8	(France) Romain Grosjean	Lotus-Mercedes	1:34.646	1:34.430		12
13	33	(Netherlands) Max Verstappen	Toro Rosso-Renault	1:34.819	1:34.502		13
14	13	(Venezuela) Pastor Maldonado	Lotus-Mercedes	1:34.877	1:34.511		14
15	9	(Sweden) Marcus Ericsson	Sauber-Ferrari	1:34.643	1:34.868		15
16	12	(Brazil) Felipe Nasr	Sauber-Ferrari	1:34.888			16
17	14	(Spain) Fernando Alonso	McLaren-Honda	1:34.959			17
18	22	(United Kingdom) Jenson Button	McLaren-Honda	1:35.207			18
19	28	(United Kingdom) Will Stevens	Marussia-Ferrari	1:37.364			19
20	98	(Spain) Roberto Merhi	Marussia-Ferrari	1:39.377			20
107% time: 1:39.965

=== Race ===
Pos.	No.	Driver	Constructor	Laps	Time/Retired	Grid	Points
1	44	(United Kingdom) Lewis Hamilton	Mercedes	52	1:31:27.729	1	25
2	6	(Germany) Nico Rosberg	Mercedes	52	+10.956	2	18
3	5	(Germany) Sebastian Vettel	Ferrari	52	+25.443	6	15
4	19	(Brazil) Felipe Massa	Williams-Mercedes	52	+36.839	3	12
5	77	(Finland) Valtteri Bottas	Williams-Mercedes	52	+1:03.194	4	10
6	26	(Russia) Daniil Kvyat	Red Bull Racing-Renault	52	+1:03.955	7	8
7	27	(Germany) Nico Hülkenberg	Force India-Mercedes	52	+1:18.744	9	6
8	7	(Finland) Kimi Räikkönen	Ferrari	51	+1 Lap	5	4
9	11	(Mexico) Sergio Pérez	Force India-Mercedes	51	+1 Lap	11	2
10	14	(Spain) Fernando Alonso	McLaren-Honda	51	+1 Lap	17	1
11	9	(Sweden) Marcus Ericsson	Sauber-Ferrari	51	+1 Lap	15	
12	98	(Spain) Roberto Merhi	Marussia-Ferrari	49	+3 Laps	20	
13	28	(United Kingdom) Will Stevens	Marussia-Ferrari	49	+3 Laps	19	
Ret	55	(Spain) Carlos Sainz Jr.	Toro Rosso-Renault	31	Electrical	8	
Ret	3	(Australia) Daniel Ricciardo	Red Bull Racing-Renault	21	Electrical	10	
Ret	33	(Netherlands) Max Verstappen	Toro Rosso-Renault	3	Spun off	13	
Ret	8	(France) Romain Grosjean	Lotus-Mercedes	0	Collision	12	
Ret	13	(Venezuela) Pastor Maldonado	Lotus-Mercedes	0	Collision damage	14	
Ret	22	(United Kingdom) Jenson Button	McLaren-Honda	0	Collision	18	
DNS	12	(Brazil) Felipe Nasr	Sauber-Ferrari	0	Gearbox	—	

Notes:

- Felipe Nasr was unable to start the race due to a gearbox problem, his place on the grid was left vacant.

== Championship standings after the race ==
Drivers' Championship standings

	Pos.	Driver	Points
	1	(United Kingdom) Lewis Hamilton	194
	2	(Germany) Nico Rosberg	177
	3	(Germany) Sebastian Vettel	135
1	4	(Finland) Valtteri Bottas	77
1	5	(Finland) Kimi Räikkönen	76

Constructors' Championship standings

Pos.	Constructor	Points
1	(Germany) Mercedes	371
2	(Italy) Ferrari	211
3	(United Kingdom) Williams-Mercedes	151
4	(Austria) Red Bull Racing-Renault	63
5	Force India-Mercedes	39

- Note: Only the top five positions are included for both sets of standings.

== See also ==
- 2015 Silverstone GP2 Series round
- 2015 Silverstone GP3 Series round

Previous race: 2015 Austrian Grand Prix	FIA Formula One World Championship; 2015 season	Next race: 2015 Hungarian Grand Prix
Previous race: 2014 British Grand Prix	British Grand Prix	Next race: 2016 British Grand Prix
