= 2015 Australian Grand Prix =

Formula One motor race

Race 1 of 19 in the 2015 Formula One World Championship
Next race →

Race details
- Date: 15 March 2015
- Official name: 2015 Formula 1 Rolex Australian Grand Prix
- Location: Albert Park Circuit, Melbourne, Victoria, Australia
- Course: Temporary street circuit
- Course length: 5.303 km (3.295 mi)
- Distance: 58 laps, 307.574 km (191.118 mi)
- Weather: Partly cloudy 17–18 °C (63–64 °F) air temperature 32–37 °C (90–99 °F) track temperature 6 m/s (20 ft/s) wind from the south
- Attendance: 296,000 (Weekend) 101,500 (Race Day)

Pole position
Driver	(United Kingdom) Lewis Hamilton	Mercedes
- Time: 1:26.327

Fastest lap
Driver	(United Kingdom) Lewis Hamilton	Mercedes
- Time: 1:30.945 on lap 50

Podium
First	(United Kingdom) Lewis Hamilton	Mercedes
Second	(Germany) Nico Rosberg	Mercedes
Third	(Germany) Sebastian Vettel	Ferrari

The 2015 Australian Grand Prix, formally titled the 2015 Formula 1 Rolex Australian Grand Prix, was a Formula One motor race that was held on 15 March 2015 in Albert Park, Melbourne, Victoria, Australia. The race was contested over fifty-eight laps of the Albert Park Circuit and was the first round of the 2015 Formula One World Championship. The race marked the 80th race in the combined history of the Australian Grand Prix – which dates back to the 100 Miles Road Race of 1928 – and the 20th time the event was held at the Melbourne Grand Prix Circuit.

Mercedes driver Nico Rosberg was the defending race winner. His team-mate, Lewis Hamilton started the race from pole, his fourth at the circuit and a record for the venue. Hamilton led home Rosberg in a Mercedes 1–2 finish, with Ferrari's Sebastian Vettel completing the podium in his first start with the team. This race also featured the debuts of future four-time world champion Max Verstappen, and future race winner Carlos Sainz, both driving for Toro Rosso. In the process, Verstappen set the record for the youngest-ever debut in Formula One at 17 years and 166 days old.

== Background ==
The 2015 Australian Grand Prix took place at the 5.303 km (3.295 mi) Albert Park Circuit in Albert Park, Melbourne, Victoria on 15 March 2015; it was the first round in the 2015 Formula One World Championship and the 20th World Championship Australian Grand Prix to be held at the circuit.

=== Pre-season testing ===
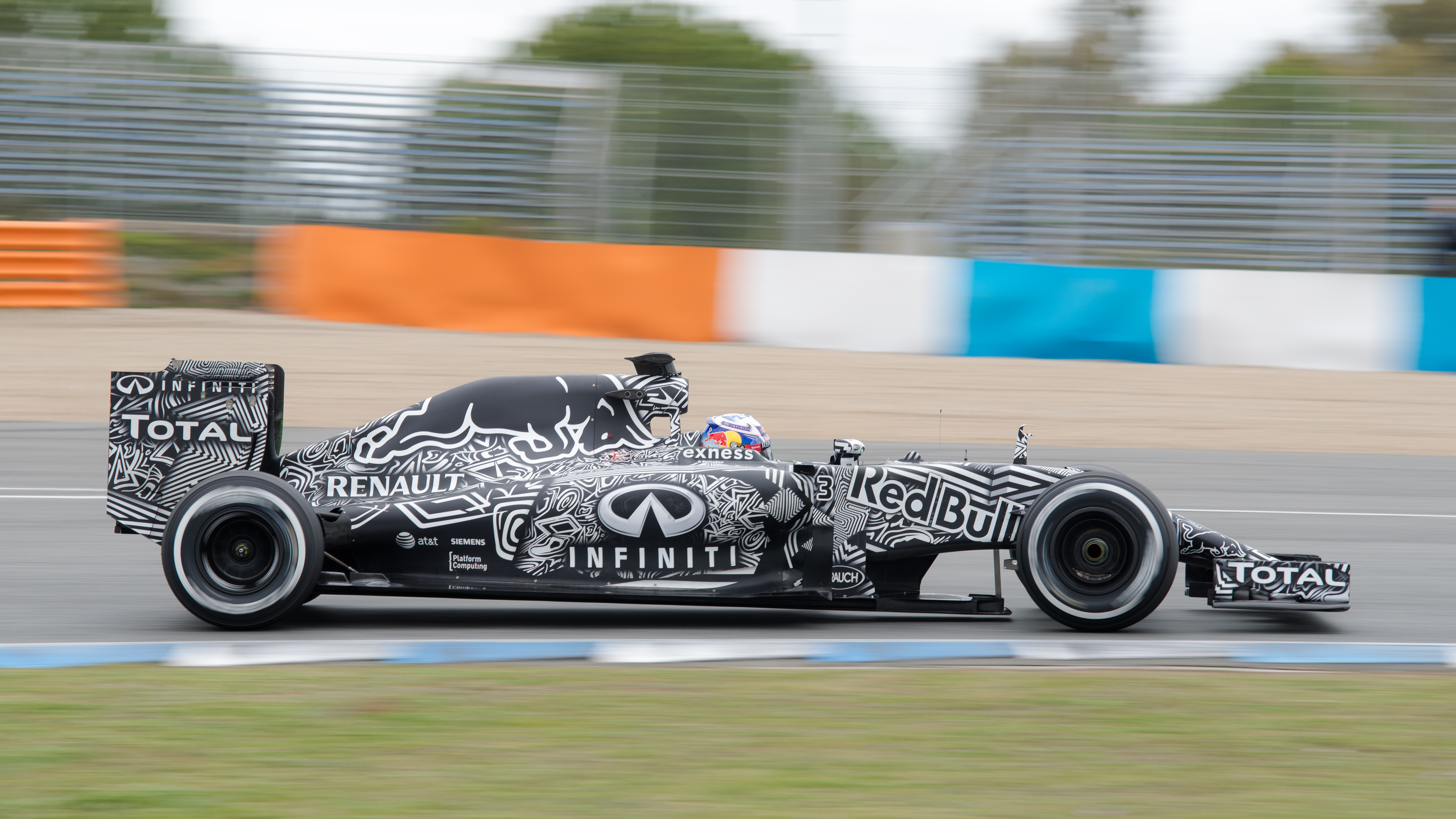
The new Red Bull RB11 sported a camouflage livery during testing.

After a dominant performance by Mercedes in the 2014 season, pre-season testing for the 2015 season proved they would still be fastest of the field. The new Williams FW37 appeared to be quick and reliable, while Ferrari in particular seemed to have made a big step forward. Former four-time world champions Red Bull ran a car in black-and-white camouflage, that did nothing to disguise the fact that the Austrian team still struggled with problems concerning their Renault engines, doing the second fewest laps during the first test in Jerez. While Lotus, Toro Rosso and Sauber were considered to be contesting for points with considerable advances made over the winter, the new partnership between McLaren and Honda got off to a bad start. The team completed 380 laps, almost half of the next worst team, Force India. Furthermore, Fernando Alonso, who had signed back to the team after his controversial 2007 season, crashed during the second testing session in Barcelona and missed the first race of the season. Force India struggled to get their new car, the VJM08, on track. After missing the first test in Jerez, they started testing with their 2014 car in Barcelona before introducing their new model late.

=== Driver changes ===
The 2015 Australian Grand Prix saw the debut of several young drivers new to Formula One and a late replacement for McLaren's Fernando Alonso. Two weeks prior to the Grand Prix, McLaren announced that Alonso would miss the inaugural 2015 race due to a concussion suffered in a crash during pre-season testing at the Circuit de Barcelona-Catalunya. Doctors advised Alonso not to race, avoiding further medical complications and his place was therefore taken by McLaren reserve driver, Kevin Magnussen, who finished second on his debut at the same event in 2014.

The new drivers to Formula One included the Toro Rosso duo of Carlos Sainz Jr. and Max Verstappen, Manor Marussia's Will Stevens – on a full-time basis, after one start in 2014 – and Roberto Merhi, and Felipe Nasr racing for Sauber. Most notably, Verstappen became the youngest driver in the history of Formula One, debuting at the age of 17 years, 166 days.

=== Manor Marussia ===
Following a tumultuous pre-season in which they went through a period of administration and were saved by late investment, Manor Marussia arrived in Melbourne with a car that had passed its mandatory crash tests, but had completed no testing. Formula Renault 3.5 Series drivers Will Stevens and Roberto Merhi were announced as their drivers, with Merhi signed on a one-race deal. However, the team did not participate in any practice sessions and subsequently failed to set a qualifying time due to a software glitch preventing their year-old Ferrari engines from being started, thus failing to qualify and leaving the field at 18 cars for the race.

=== Legal action against Sauber ===
A week before the start of the Grand Prix weekend, Dutch driver Giedo van der Garde launched legal action against Sauber before the Supreme Court of Victoria, to enforce a contract he entered into in June 2014 to drive for the team during the 2015 season. This action was based on an award that van der Garde obtained on 2 March 2015 through international arbitration in Switzerland, which he initiated after the team announced in November 2014 that their 2015 drivers would instead be Marcus Ericsson and Felipe Nasr. On Wednesday, 11 March 2015, van der Garde succeeded by obtaining court orders compelling Sauber to permit him to drive in Melbourne. On the same day, Sauber appealed the orders made against them and also publicly announced that they would not compromise the safety of the team or other drivers by putting van der Garde in the car, since the C34 chassis had only been tailored to fit Ericsson and Nasr.

The appeal was heard and dismissed the following day on 12 March 2015. As part of its legal argument, aside from raising safety concerns, Sauber also submitted that van der Garde's contract had been terminated by the team in February with the approval of the Fédération Internationale de l'Automobile (FIA)'s Contract Recognition Board in any event, and that van der Garde violated confidentiality clauses of the contract by discussing it with the media. Lawyers representing Ericsson and Nasr further argued that van der Garde had not followed due process by failing to give their clients prior notice of his legal action. The court upheld the previous orders to permit van der Garde to participate in the race and adjourned the hearing to the following day on 13 March 2015, to hear arguments on contempt of court proceedings launched by van der Garde's legal team against Sauber's team principal, Monisha Kaltenborn.

Some two hours after the court made its initial judgment in favour of van der Garde, the FIA published an entry list for the Australian Grand Prix that included both Nasr and Ericsson for Sauber following pre-event scrutineering. Despite this, neither driver took to the circuit during the first practice session on the Friday due to Sauber running the risk of having team assets seized for not complying with court orders. Nevertheless, based on media speculation about Bernie Ecclestone's intervention to avoid further negative publicity on the sport, Ericsson and Nasr did participate in that afternoon's second practice session. On Saturday, 14 March 2015, the dispute reached a temporary resolution thanks to van der Garde announcing that he would forego racing in Melbourne, with a view to finding a more permanent solution in the future.

=== Tyres ===
Pirelli announced they would be supplying teams with the white-banded medium compound tyre as the prime selection and the yellow-banded soft compound as the option selection for the event.

== Practice ==
Per the regulations for the 2015 season, three practice sessions were held, two 1.5-hour sessions on Friday and another one-hour session before qualifying on Saturday. Mercedes confirmed their good form from pre-season testing and topped the time sheets by a considerable margin in the first two practice sessions on Friday, with Nico Rosberg fastest in both outings. Valtteri Bottas in the Williams was third fastest on Friday morning, some 1.2 seconds down on Rosberg's time. Ferrari's new signing Sebastian Vettel was third on Friday afternoon, seven-tenths of a second down on Rosberg. Toro Rosso showed promising times, outperforming their sister team Red Bull in the first session. Only 16 cars participated on Friday morning. Sauber kept to the garage due to their legal troubles while Manor Marussia was unable to get their cars running all weekend. The Saubers did go out for the second session, while local favourite Daniel Ricciardo and Felipe Massa missed the session due to problems with their cars. McLaren's problems continued as both cars were limited to very few laps. The first session also saw another evaluation run of the new Virtual Safety Car system.

Lewis Hamilton lapped faster than his teammate during the third practice session on Saturday morning, as Rosberg only managed third behind Vettel, almost a second down on Hamilton. Both Williams and Ferrari had another good session, while Lotus got both their drivers in the top ten, raising hopes for a points finish on Sunday. Red Bull continued to struggle, with Ricciardo and Daniil Kvyat down in 15th and 18th and Ricciardo's car stopping at the end of pit lane due to engine problems. Between them were the once more off-the-pace McLaren drivers.

== Qualifying ==
Qualifying consisted of three parts, 18, 15 and 12 minutes in length respectively, with five drivers eliminated from competing after each of the first two sessions. Since the cars of Manor Marussia failed to start, only three drivers were eliminated during the first session of qualifying (Q1), all of which was run in dry conditions. The McLaren cars of Jenson Button and Kevin Magnussen struggled as expected, following their lack of pre-season testing and failed to make it into Q2, just as Sauber driver Marcus Ericsson. Mercedes and Williams' Valtteri Bottas were the only ones not having to use the softer tyres to proceed into the next part of qualifying.

The second session saw the Mercedes drivers doing only one timed run, which proved sufficient to proceed, while the Red Bull and Toro Rosso cars were split up, with Daniil Kvyat and rookie Max Verstappen failing to make it through. Also eliminated were both Force India drivers and the second Sauber of Felipe Nasr, though in a respectable eleventh place on the grid.

In Q3, Nico Rosberg ran wide onto the grass at turn 15 on his first flying lap and lost the chance to seek areas of improvement for his second run. Lewis Hamilton, who was fastest in all three sessions, capitalized on his teammate's problem and took pole position by over half a second. It was his 39th pole position and his 4th at Albert Park. The rest of the field was more than a second behind Hamilton's time, with Felipe Massa in the Williams best of the rest in third position. The two Ferrari cars of Sebastian Vettel and Kimi Räikkönen proved their regained competitiveness by taking fourth and fifth on the grid respectively.

=== Qualifying classification ===
Pos.	Car no.	Driver	Constructor	Qualifying times			Final grid
Pos.	Car no.	Driver	Constructor	Q1	Q2	Q3	Final grid
1	44	(United Kingdom) Lewis Hamilton	Mercedes	1:28.586	1:26.894	1:26.327	1
2	6	(Germany) Nico Rosberg	Mercedes	1:28.906	1:27.097	1:26.921	2
3	19	(Brazil) Felipe Massa	Williams-Mercedes	1:29.246	1:27.895	1:27.718	3
4	5	(Germany) Sebastian Vettel	Ferrari	1:29.307	1:27.742	1:27.757	4
5	7	(Finland) Kimi Räikkönen	Ferrari	1:29.754	1:27.807	1:27.790	5
6	77	(Finland) Valtteri Bottas	Williams-Mercedes	1:29.641	1:27.796	1:28.087	—^{2}
7	3	(Australia) Daniel Ricciardo	Red Bull Racing-Renault	1:29.788	1:28.679	1:28.329	6
8	55	(Spain) Carlos Sainz Jr.	Toro Rosso-Renault	1:29.597	1:28.601	1:28.510	7
9	8	(France) Romain Grosjean	Lotus-Mercedes	1:29.537	1:28.589	1:28.560	8
10	13	(Venezuela) Pastor Maldonado	Lotus-Mercedes	1:29.847	1:28.726	1:29.480	9
11	12	(Brazil) Felipe Nasr	Sauber-Ferrari	1:30.430	1:28.800	N/A	10
12	33	(Netherlands) Max Verstappen	Toro Rosso-Renault	1:29.248	1:28.868	N/A	11
13	26	(Russia) Daniil Kvyat	Red Bull Racing-Renault	1:30.402	1:29.070	N/A	12
14	27	(Germany) Nico Hülkenberg	Force India-Mercedes	1:29.651	1:29.208	N/A	13
15	11	(Mexico) Sergio Pérez	Force India-Mercedes	1:29.990	1:29.209	N/A	14
16	9	(Sweden) Marcus Ericsson	Sauber-Ferrari	1:31.376	N/A	N/A	15
17	22	(United Kingdom) Jenson Button	McLaren-Honda	1:31.422	N/A	N/A	16
18	20	(Denmark) Kevin Magnussen	McLaren-Honda	1:32.037	N/A	N/A	17
107% time: 1:34.787
DNP	28	(United Kingdom) Will Stevens	Marussia-Ferrari	No time	N/A	N/A	
DNP	98	(Spain) Roberto Merhi	Marussia-Ferrari	No time	N/A	N/A	

== Race ==
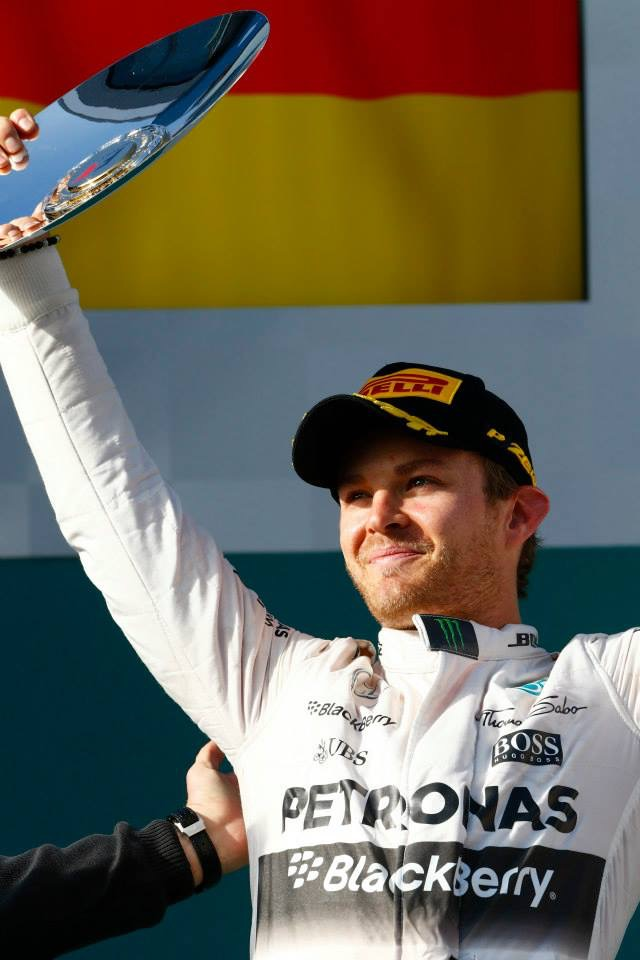
Nico Rosberg celebrates second place during the podium ceremony.

Since the Manor Marussia cars were unable to make their race debut, there were 18 qualified cars left. Before the race began, Valtteri Bottas was deemed unfit to compete by FIA medical delegate Jean-Charles Piette due to Bottas suffering an annular disc tear in his lower back during qualifying. Both Daniil Kvyat's Red Bull and Kevin Magnussen's McLaren failed to make it to the grid as their cars broke down on the out-lap; Kvyat suffering transmission problems and Magnussen with an engine failure. This left the grid with 15 starters – the lowest number for a season-opening race since 1963 and the lowest overall since the 2005 United States Grand Prix.

When the red lights went out to signify the start of the race, Hamilton assumed the lead while a three-car wide tussle at turn one, involving Kimi Räikkönen, Felipe Nasr and Pastor Maldonado, resulted in Maldonado crashing out at turn two and race officials deploying the safety car. On the next lap, Romain Grosjean's engine lost power thus taking both Lotus cars out of the race. The safety car was withdrawn on lap four, with Carlos Sainz Jr. falling back from fifth to his starting position in seventh place after being passed by Nasr and Daniel Ricciardo. Nasr also lost track position after being ordered by his team to relinquish a position for overtaking while still under safety car conditions.

Hamilton maintained the race lead while saving fuel before increasing his pace until the end of lap 25, when he made a pit stop for a new set of the medium compound tyres. He resumed the lead from Rosberg after he too had to make a pit stop for new medium compound tyres. During this series of pit stops, Sebastian Vettel gained a position by passing Felipe Massa for third place. On lap 34, Max Verstappen retired from the race while running in sixth place after the rear of his Toro Rosso car was engulfed by smoke due to an engine failure. On lap 41, Räikkönen also retired at turn four after the mechanic was unable to fully tighten a cross-threaded left-rear wheel peg that had been embedded in a stub axle during a pit stop, causing his left rear tyre to come loose. This put Jenson Button briefly into the tenth and final points position but for Sergio Pérez quickly passing the McLaren-Honda driver after a 42-lap battle that begun at the start, for last position.

From there, the order remained relatively constant with Hamilton going on to take his 34th Grand Prix win. He was followed by Rosberg, who was 1.3 seconds behind in second. Vettel was third, Massa took fourth and Nasr came in fifth. Completing the point-scorers were Ricciardo, Nico Hülkenberg, Ericsson, Sainz and Pérez in positions six through ten. In all, only eleven cars finished the race with Button's McLaren being the only car to finish outside the points and everyone from sixth position down lapped.

Ericsson, Nasr and Sainz all scored their first Formula One points, with Nasr and Sainz doing so on debut. In addition, Nasr achieved the highest placing for a Brazilian driver making their Grand Prix début.

=== Post-race ===
There was satisfaction at Mercedes, with second-placed Nico Rosberg calling it "an awesome start to the season for us as a team". Rosberg praised Lewis Hamilton's performance in particular, saying: "He drove like a world champion all weekend, so couldn't quite beat him but for sure I was trying every single lap, all the way to the maximum, and I will do all year."

The dominant performance by the Mercedes cars sparked controversy in the paddock. Daniel Ricciardo issued apologies to the Australian fans after what he felt was a "boring" race. Red Bull quarreled with their engine manufacturer Renault and lamented the dominance of their rivals, calling for the FIA to step in and apply rule changes to level the field, fearing that the public would lose interest in the sport if nothing happened. Mercedes chief Toto Wolff reacted furiously, telling his rivals to "get your f*****g head down and work to sort it out", but later made it clear that he "didn't mean the f-word in relation to him" regarding the comments by Christian Horner. Nico Rosberg voiced hopes that their rivals would get closer over the course of the season, saying during the post-race press conference: "I hope we can have a good fight. That would be awesome." This statement caused amusement from Sebastian Vettel, who replied: "Be honest. Do you really hope so? Seriously? You finished 30 seconds ahead of us and you hope it's going to be closer? So you hope you slow down? Is that what you're saying?"

Sauber was delighted by their performance over the weekend, having scored 14 points in the first race of the season, compared to none in the entire previous season. Because Manor Marussia failed to notify the stewards of their inability to field a car, the team was summoned by the FIA to explain why they did not participate in qualifying. However, the hearing provided sufficient evidence to the FIA's satisfaction that the team would have been unable to field their cars, even if they had violated curfew. Despite this, Ecclestone subsequently announced that Manor Marussia would have to cover their freight charges to and from Australia, costs normally covered by Formula One Management.

=== Race classification ===
Pos.	No.	Driver	Constructor	Laps	Time/Retired	Grid	Points
1	44	(United Kingdom) Lewis Hamilton	Mercedes	58	1:31:54.067	1	25
2	6	(Germany) Nico Rosberg	Mercedes	58	+1.360	2	18
3	5	(Germany) Sebastian Vettel	Ferrari	58	+34.523	4	15
4	19	(Brazil) Felipe Massa	Williams-Mercedes	58	+38.196	3	12
5	12	(Brazil) Felipe Nasr	Sauber-Ferrari	58	+1:35.149	10	10
6	3	(Australia) Daniel Ricciardo	Red Bull Racing-Renault	57	+1 Lap	6	8
7	27	(Germany) Nico Hülkenberg	Force India-Mercedes	57	+1 Lap	13	6
8	9	(Sweden) Marcus Ericsson	Sauber-Ferrari	57	+1 Lap	15	4
9	55	(Spain) Carlos Sainz Jr.	Toro Rosso-Renault	57	+1 Lap	7	2
10	11	(Mexico) Sergio Pérez	Force India-Mercedes	57	+1 Lap	14	1
11	22	(United Kingdom) Jenson Button	McLaren-Honda	56	+2 Laps	16	
Ret	7	(Finland) Kimi Räikkönen	Ferrari	40	Wheel	5	
Ret	33	(Netherlands) Max Verstappen	Toro Rosso-Renault	32	Engine	11	
Ret	8	(France) Romain Grosjean	Lotus-Mercedes	0	Power loss	8	
Ret	13	(Venezuela) Pastor Maldonado	Lotus-Mercedes	0	Collision	9	
DNS	26	(Russia) Daniil Kvyat	Red Bull Racing-Renault	0	Gearbox	—^{1}	
DNS	20	(Denmark) Kevin Magnussen	McLaren-Honda	0	Engine	—^{1}	
DNS	77	(Finland) Valtteri Bottas	Williams-Mercedes	0	Injury	—^{2}	

Notes:

- ^1 – Both Kvyat's and Magnussen's cars failed on the way from the pitlane to the starting grid.
- ^2 – As Valtteri Bottas was unable to start the race due to a back injury suffered during qualifying and spending the night at the hospital without being cleared to race by the FIA, all cars behind him moved up one place to close the gap.

== Championship standings after the race ==
Drivers' Championship standings

Pos.	Driver	Points
1	(United Kingdom) Lewis Hamilton	25
2	(Germany) Nico Rosberg	18
3	(Germany) Sebastian Vettel	15
4	(Brazil) Felipe Massa	12
5	(Brazil) Felipe Nasr	10

Constructors' Championship standings

Pos.	Constructor	Points
1	(Germany) Mercedes	43
2	(Italy) Ferrari	15
3	(Switzerland) Sauber-Ferrari	14
4	(United Kingdom) Williams-Mercedes	12
5	(Austria) Red Bull Racing-Renault	8

- Note: Only the top five positions are included for both sets of standings.

Previous race: 2014 Abu Dhabi Grand Prix	FIA Formula One World Championship; 2015 season	Next race: 2015 Malaysian Grand Prix
Previous race: 2014 Australian Grand Prix	Australian Grand Prix	Next race: 2016 Australian Grand Prix
