= 2014 Abu Dhabi Grand Prix =

Race 19 of 19 in the 2014 Formula One World Championship
← Previous race	Next race →

Race details
- Date: 23 November 2014
- Official name: 2014 Formula 1 Etihad Airways Abu Dhabi Grand Prix
- Location: Yas Marina Circuit; Yas Island, Abu Dhabi, United Arab Emirates
- Course: Permanent racing facility
- Course length: 5.554 km (3.451 miles)
- Distance: 55 laps, 305.355 km (189.739 miles)
- Weather: Clear skies; Air temp: 30 °C (86 °F) during the day, dropping to 24 °C (75.2 °F). Wind speed: 8 km/h (4.9 mph). (Night race)
- Attendance: 60,000

Pole position
Driver	(Germany) Nico Rosberg	Mercedes
- Time: 1:40.480

Fastest lap
Driver	(Australia) Daniel Ricciardo	Red Bull Racing-Renault
- Time: 1:44.496 on lap 50

Podium
First	(United Kingdom) Lewis Hamilton	Mercedes
Second	(Brazil) Felipe Massa	Williams-Mercedes
Third	(Finland) Valtteri Bottas	Williams-Mercedes

The 2014 Abu Dhabi Grand Prix (formally known as the 2014 Formula 1 Etihad Airways Abu Dhabi Grand Prix) was a Formula One motor race held at the Yas Marina Circuit on 23 November 2014. The race was the nineteenth and final round of the 2014 season, the 916th World Championship race, and marked the sixth running of the Abu Dhabi Grand Prix.

Double points were awarded for the first time at this race. This change to the points system was not well received in the months leading up to the race, and the implementation of this system turned out to be a one-off. The series would revert to the 25–18–15–12–10–8–6–4–2–1 system in use since 2010 for all races, beginning with the 2015 Australian Grand Prix.

The race determined the World Drivers' Championship between Mercedes drivers Nico Rosberg and Lewis Hamilton, with the latter winning both the race and the title. This would prove to be the final Grand Prix for Jean-Éric Vergne, Adrian Sutil and Kamui Kobayashi as well as the last Grand Prix for the Caterham team, which collapsed before the start of the 2015 season.

== Report ==
=== Background ===
==== Changes to points structure ====
For the first time in the history of Formula One, teams and drivers scored double the number of points awarded for race finish positions. The FIA implemented this in order to maximise focus on the championship until the end of the season. Originally Bernie Ecclestone wanted double points for the last three races of the season, but the teams ultimately decided to have double points for only the last race of the season. The rule change was negatively received by teams and drivers.

As a result of the double points offered for the race, Lewis Hamilton needed to finish in the top two to guarantee the championship. Under the regular points structure he would have only needed to finish sixth to guarantee the title. However, as the results fell, the changes to the points allocation made no difference to the championship winner, and very little difference further down the field. The double-points structure was eliminated for the 2015 season and has not been used again in Formula 1 since.

==== Team changes ====
Marussia did not contest the Grand Prix as a bid to save the team from collapsing failed in the week before the Brazilian Grand Prix, forcing the team to close down. They had made a last-minute attempt to race in Abu Dhabi, with rumours that they were being sought after by a potential investor. However, those negotiations fell through, ending their chances of making a return to the grid.

Facing a similar financial situation, Caterham launched a crowdsourcing campaign to attend the race, which ultimately proved successful and the team returned for the season-ending race, bringing the grid up to 20 cars. Although Caterham retained Kamui Kobayashi for the race, Marcus Ericsson had terminated his contract with Caterham a week and a half before the race, forcing Caterham to hire another driver. 24 Hours of Le Mans winner André Lotterer, who also drove for Caterham in the 2014 Belgian Grand Prix, was originally linked towards the role, but he turned down the offer. Will Stevens, a former Marussia test driver, took the drive instead and made his Formula One debut. This was also the last race for Caterham as the team collapsed before the start of 2015.

==== Tyres ====
For the first time since Pirelli became the sole tyre provider, they supplied the yellow-banded soft tyre as the prime compound, while the red-banded supersoft was the option selection for the event. The previous three seasons saw the medium and soft selections used.

==== Virtual Safety Car (VSC) ====
The FIA again tested its Virtual Safety Car system, proposed for the 2015 season, to better deal with race track emergencies following the incident suffered by Jules Bianchi during the 2014 Japanese Grand Prix. The version tested in Abu Dhabi, however, was not preferred to that tested at the preceding United States and Brazilian Grands Prix.

==== Championship permutations ====
The race decided the outcome of the championship battle between Lewis Hamilton (who entered on 334 points) and Nico Rosberg (who entered on 317 points). The champion permutations were as follows:

	Hamilton would have won if:	
	(United Kingdom) Lewis Hamilton	(Germany) Nico Rosberg
Pos.	2nd or better	Does not matter
Pos.	3rd, 4th or 5th	2nd or lower
Pos.	6th	3rd or lower
Pos.	7th or 8th	4th or lower
Pos.	9th	5th or lower
Pos.	10th or lower	6th or lower

	Rosberg would have won if:	
	(Germany) Nico Rosberg	(United Kingdom) Lewis Hamilton
Pos.	1st	3rd or lower
Pos.	2nd	6th or lower
Pos.	3rd	7th or lower
Pos.	4th	9th or lower
Pos.	5th	10th or lower

=== Practice ===
Championship leader Lewis Hamilton topped the first and second practice sessions, while teammate and championship contender Nico Rosberg topped the third and final practice session.

=== Qualifying ===
Lewis Hamilton set the fastest time in Q1. He set the fastest time again in Q2, posting a time 0.539 seconds faster than championship rival Nico Rosberg after his teammate had scruffy laps. The situation was reversed in Q3, with Hamilton having two scruffy laps, and Rosberg took pole position with a time of 1:40.480, with Hamilton 0.386 seconds behind in second.

==== Post-qualifying ====
Red Bull Racing drivers Sebastian Vettel and Daniel Ricciardo were excluded from qualifying after their cars were found to have front wings that flexed under an aerodynamic load in contravention of the sporting regulations which prohibit movable aerodynamic devices. With their times disallowed, both drivers were relegated to the back of the grid. The team was then forced to change their front wings so as to make their cars legal for the race – a parc fermé violation – and were further penalised, having to start the race from the pit lane.

Romain Grosjean received a cumulative series of penalties for exceeding his quota of power unit components, totalling a twenty-place grid penalty. With Grosjean qualifying sixteenth—before Red Bull were excluded—he was unable to serve the full penalty. However, as the race marked the final Grand Prix of the 2014 season, the stewards were unable to carry the penalty over to the 2015 Australian Grand Prix, and so Grosjean was given a pit lane drive-through penalty in lieu of the remaining grid penalty.

=== Race ===
Lewis Hamilton got a good start from second on the grid and got ahead of polesitter and championship rival Nico Rosberg by the first corner. At the end of lap 1 Hamilton had a 1.2 second lead over his teammate, which grew to 2.6 seconds by lap 22. On lap 23 Rosberg's troubles began, as he locked up and ran off the track at turn 17 - rejoining 3.9 seconds behind Hamilton - and the following lap he reported he was losing engine power. On lap 25 Rosberg had dropped to 7.1 seconds behind Hamilton, and he was told over the radio that his ERS had failed. Over the following laps Rosberg dropped down the field. Hamilton began to lower his pace - avoiding kerbs and asking his team to keep the engine turned down - in an effort to avoid suffering the same fate as his teammate. This allowed Felipe Massa to make gains on the race leader over the following laps. As Massa emerged from his final stop - putting on the super-soft tyre - he was 11 seconds behind Hamilton, and with fresh tyres he started to close the gap. However it was ultimately not enough, as Hamilton increased his pace by just enough to keep Massa in check. Hamilton crossed the line 2.5 seconds ahead of second-placed Massa to win the race, and with it his second world championship. Valtteri Bottas took the final podium position, giving Williams their first double podium since the 2005 Monaco Grand Prix, and under the double points the team scored 66 points, a record that still stands for a team for a single race. Daniel Ricciardo and Sebastian Vettel, who had both started the race from the pit lane, finished in 4th and 8th respectively, after Ricciardo managed to pass Kevin Magnussen early on in the race while Vettel got stuck behind him, which had the knock-on effect of causing him to be stuck behind the Force India cars later in the race.

Rosberg ultimately finished down in 14th, as his car situation got even worse in the closing laps. On lap 53 he was advised over the radio to retire the car, as his chances of scoring any points were effectively over and his car had developed too many problems. However, Rosberg responded by saying he would like to go to the end and finish the race, which he ultimately did.

==== Post-race ====
Ahead of the podium ceremony, Nico Rosberg entered into the cooldown room to congratulate championship rival Lewis Hamilton on winning the title. Hamilton later paid tribute to Rosberg for his graciousness in defeat.

Although Rosberg suffered an energy recovery system (ERS) failure and dropped out of the points during the race, he acknowledged that his problem did not make a difference to the championship outcome in the end, as Hamilton would have had to finish 3rd or lower for him to have a chance of winning the title anyway.

Mercedes set two new records, the first being 701 total points, the second being the margin of 296 points to second-placed Red Bull-Renault.

== Classification ==
=== Qualifying ===
Pos.	No.	Driver	Constructor	Q1	Q2	Q3	Grid
1	6	(Germany) Nico Rosberg	Mercedes	1:41.308	1:41.459	1:40.480	1
2	44	(United Kingdom) Lewis Hamilton	Mercedes	1:41.207	1:40.920	1:40.866	2
3	77	(Finland) Valtteri Bottas	Williams-Mercedes	1:42.346	1:41.376	1:41.025	3
4	19	(Brazil) Felipe Massa	Williams-Mercedes	1:41.475	1:41.144	1:41.119	4
5	26	(Russia) Daniil Kvyat	Toro Rosso-Renault	1:42.302	1:42.082	1:41.908	5
6	22	(United Kingdom) Jenson Button	McLaren-Mercedes	1:42.137	1:41.875	1:41.964	6
7	7	(Finland) Kimi Räikkönen	Ferrari	1:42.439	1:42.168	1:42.236	7
8	14	(Spain) Fernando Alonso	Ferrari	1:42.467	1:41.940	1:42.866	8
9	20	(Denmark) Kevin Magnussen	McLaren-Mercedes	1:42.104	1:42.198		9
10	25	(France) Jean-Éric Vergne	Toro Rosso-Renault	1:42.413	1:42.207		10
11	11	(Mexico) Sergio Pérez	Force India-Mercedes	1:42.654	1:42.239		11
12	27	(Germany) Nico Hülkenberg	Force India-Mercedes	1:42.444	1:42.384		12
13	99	(Germany) Adrian Sutil	Sauber-Ferrari	1:42.746	1:43.074		13
14	8	(France) Romain Grosjean	Lotus-Renault	1:42.768			18^{1}
15	21	(Mexico) Esteban Gutiérrez	Sauber-Ferrari	1:42.819			14
16	13	(Venezuela) Pastor Maldonado	Lotus-Renault	1:42.860			15
17	10	(Japan) Kamui Kobayashi	Caterham-Renault	1:44.540			16
18	46	(United Kingdom) Will Stevens	Caterham-Renault	1:45.095			17
EX	1	(Germany) Sebastian Vettel	Red Bull Racing-Renault	1:42.495	1:42.147	1:41.893	19^{2}
EX	3	(Australia) Daniel Ricciardo	Red Bull Racing-Renault	1:42.204	1:41.692	1:41.267	20^{2}
107% time: 1:48.291

Notes:

- ^1 — Romain Grosjean qualified in sixteenth but was demoted four grid places as part of twenty-place penalty for using his sixth power unit of the season.
- ^2 — Daniel Ricciardo and Sebastian Vettel originally qualified in fifth and sixth respectively, but were excluded from the qualifying results and were relegated to the back of the grid for illegal front wings.

=== Race ===
Pos.	No.	Driver	Constructor	Laps	Time/Retired	Grid	Points
1	44	(United Kingdom) Lewis Hamilton	Mercedes	55	1:39:02.619	2	50
2	19	(Brazil) Felipe Massa	Williams-Mercedes	55	+2.576	4	36
3	77	(Finland) Valtteri Bottas	Williams-Mercedes	55	+28.880	3	30
4	3	(Australia) Daniel Ricciardo	Red Bull Racing-Renault	55	+37.237	PL^{3}	24
5	22	(United Kingdom) Jenson Button	McLaren-Mercedes	55	+1:00.334	6	20
6	27	(Germany) Nico Hülkenberg	Force India-Mercedes	55	+1:02.148	12	16
7	11	(Mexico) Sergio Pérez	Force India-Mercedes	55	+1:11.060	11	12
8	1	(Germany) Sebastian Vettel	Red Bull Racing-Renault	55	+1:12.045	PL^{3}	8
9	14	(Spain) Fernando Alonso	Ferrari	55	+1:25.813	8	4
10	7	(Finland) Kimi Räikkönen	Ferrari	55	+1:27.820	7	2
11	20	(Denmark) Kevin Magnussen	McLaren-Mercedes	55	+1:30.376	9	
12	25	(France) Jean-Éric Vergne	Toro Rosso-Renault	55	+1:31.947	10	
13	8	(France) Romain Grosjean	Lotus-Renault	54	+1 Lap	18	
14	6	(Germany) Nico Rosberg	Mercedes	54	+1 Lap	1	
15	21	(Mexico) Esteban Gutiérrez	Sauber-Ferrari	54	+1 Lap	14	
16	99	(Germany) Adrian Sutil	Sauber-Ferrari	54	+1 Lap	13	
17	46	(United Kingdom) Will Stevens	Caterham-Renault	54	+1 Lap	17	
Ret	10	(Japan) Kamui Kobayashi	Caterham-Renault	42	Vibrations	16	
Ret	13	(Venezuela) Pastor Maldonado	Lotus-Renault	26	Engine	15	
Ret	26	(Russia) Daniil Kvyat	Toro Rosso-Renault	14	Driveshaft	5	

Notes:

- ^3 — Sebastian Vettel and Daniel Ricciardo were further penalised for having their front wings replaced after qualifying, which violated parc fermé regulations even though the wings were deemed illegal, and were forced to start from the pit lane instead of the back of the grid.

== Final Championship standings ==
Drivers' Championship standings

	Pos.	Driver	Points
	1	(United Kingdom) Lewis Hamilton	384
	2	(Germany) Nico Rosberg	317
	3	(Australia) Daniel Ricciardo	238
2	4	(Finland) Valtteri Bottas	186
1	5	(Germany) Sebastian Vettel	167

Constructors' Championship standings

Pos.	Constructor	Points
1	(Germany) Mercedes	701
2	(Austria) Red Bull Racing-Renault	405
3	(United Kingdom) Williams-Mercedes	320
4	(Italy) Ferrari	216
5	(United Kingdom) McLaren-Mercedes	181

- Note: Only the top five positions are included for both sets of standings.
- Bold text and an asterisk indicates the 2014 World Champions.

== See also ==
- 2014 Yas Marina GP2 Series round
- 2014 Yas Marina GP3 Series round

Previous race: 2014 Brazilian Grand Prix	FIA Formula One World Championship; 2014 season	Next race: 2015 Australian Grand Prix
Previous race: 2013 Abu Dhabi Grand Prix	Abu Dhabi Grand Prix	Next race: 2015 Abu Dhabi Grand Prix
