= 2013 Malaysian Grand Prix =

Race 2 of 19 in the 2013 Formula One World Championship
← Previous race	Next race →

Race details
- Date: 24 March 2013
- Official name: 2013 Formula 1 Petronas Malaysia Grand Prix
- Location: Sepang International Circuit, Sepang, Selangor, Malaysia
- Course: Permanent racing facility
- Course length: 5.543 km (3.444 miles)
- Distance: 56 laps, 310.408 km (192.879 miles)
- Weather: Light rain clearing to cloudy and dry
- Attendance: 90,000

Pole position
Driver	(Germany) Sebastian Vettel	Red Bull-Renault
- Time: 1:49.674

Fastest lap
Driver	(Mexico) Sergio Pérez	McLaren-Mercedes
- Time: 1:39.199 on lap 56

Podium
First	(Germany) Sebastian Vettel	Red Bull-Renault
Second	(Australia) Mark Webber	Red Bull-Renault
Third	(United Kingdom) Lewis Hamilton	Mercedes

The 2013 Malaysian Grand Prix (officially the 2013 Formula 1 Petronas Malaysia Grand Prix) was a Formula One motor race held at the Sepang International Circuit in Sepang, Selangor on 24 March 2013 before 90,000 people. It was the second round of the 2013 Formula One World Championship, and the 15th Formula One race held in Malaysia. Red Bull driver Sebastian Vettel won the 56-lap race from pole position. His teammate Mark Webber finished second, and Lewis Hamilton was third for the Mercedes team.

Kimi Räikkönen was leading the World Drivers' Championship after winning the season-opening Australian Grand Prix and Ferrari led the World Constructors' Championship. The race began on a damp track after an earlier downpour, with Vettel in pole position alongside Felipe Massa of Ferrari; Massa's teammate Fernando Alonso, and Hamilton began from third and fourth. Webber moved from fifth to second by the second lap, and took the lead after Vettel made his first pit stop for dry slick tyres on lap five. He maintained that position through most of the race until Vettel ignored a team order from Red Bull to lower the performance of his engine, overtaking Webber for the lead on the 46th lap. Vettel maintained the lead for the final nine laps for his first victory of the season and the 27th of his career. Hamilton finished 12 seconds behind, and his teammate Nico Rosberg was told by Mercedes team principal Ross Brawn to hold fourth place.

Vettel apologised to the Red Bull team and Webber for ignoring the order to hold position; Red Bull did not punish or reprimand him because his attorneys threatened legal action, and he recanted the apology three weeks later. Webber was asked to present his version of events to Red Bull founder and co-owner Dietrich Mateschitz. Vettel's victory placed him in the lead of the World Drivers' Championship that he would not relinquish for the rest of the season, after Lotus driver Räikkönen finished seventh. Red Bull took the lead of the World Constructors' Championship from Ferrari, with 17 races left in the season.

== Background ==
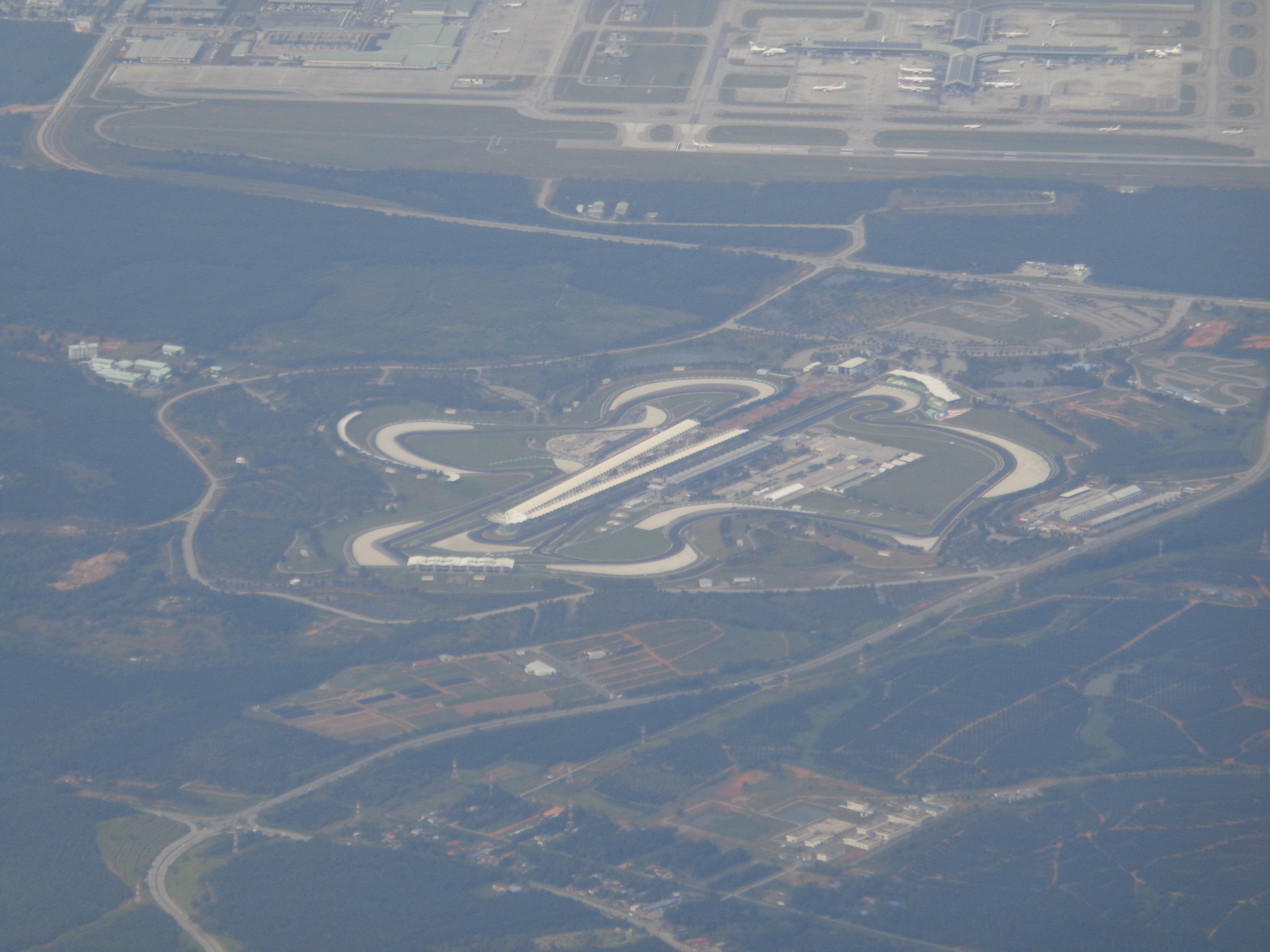
The Sepang International Circuit (pictured in 2016), where the race was held

The 2013 Malaysian Grand Prix was the 2nd of the 19 rounds of the 2013 Formula One World Championship, and the 15th Formula One Malaysian race. It was held at the 15-turn 5.543 km (3.444 mi) Sepang International Circuit in Sepang, Selangor on 24 March. A Fédération Internationale de l'Automobile (FIA, motorsport's governing body)-sanctioned race has been held in Malaysia since the 1960s, with the first editions run in Singapore—then part of the Malaysian Federation—before moving to the Shah Alam Circuit. With the arrival of Formula One in 1999, the race was moved to the purpose-built Sepang International Circuit, where all editions were held until 2017.

Tyre supplier Pirelli brought white-banded, medium compound tyres; red-banded, hard compound dry tyres; green-banded, intermediate compound tyres; and dark-blue-banded wet-weather tyres to the race. The drag reduction system (DRS), an adjustable flap at the back of each car that helps with overtaking when activated, had two activation zones for the race: one on the straight, linking turns 14 and 15, and another on the straight between the final and first corners. For the race, a debris fence on the pit lane wall was extended to better safeguard track marshals. There were 11 teams (each representing a different constructor) that each entered two race drivers, with no changes from the season entry list.

After winning the season-opening Australian Grand Prix one week earlier, Lotus driver Kimi Räikkönen led the World Drivers' Championship with 25 championship points, ahead of Ferrari's Fernando Alonso and Red Bull's Sebastian Vettel in second and third, with 18 and 15 championship points. Alonso's teammate Felipe Massa was fourth with 12 championship points, and Mercedes driver Lewis Hamilton was fifth with ten championship points. Ferrari led the World Constructors' Championship with 30 championship points; Lotus and Red Bull followed with 26 and 23 championship points, respectively. Mercedes and Force India held fourth place, with ten championship points each.

Vettel said that the Australian Grand Prix would be meaningless later in the year, and predicted that with the different conditions and tyres in Malaysia, he would outpace Ferrari and Lotus. His teammate, Mark Webber, explained that Red Bull required an improvement in car performance for the race: "As a team we weren't as strong as we thought we'd be. But that's Formula One – it can change very quickly. We've got a very, very hot track this week in Sepang. So let's see how we go for the next few races. It's the first marker in the sand." Hamilton said that Mercedes would bring what they learnt about team strategy from Melbourne to Sepang, and would have good results if his team then scored ten points.

For the second consecutive race, reliability issues with the telemetry link between race control and the cars prompted the FIA to disable the system, stopping teams from informing drivers of an incident or being lapped, and the FIA could not disable DRS in inclement weather or a safety car. The stewards advised drivers to comply with DRS usage rules, and required teams to inform them when the system was disabled. If officials deployed the safety car, drivers were ordered to manually press a button on their steering wheel to slow their cars as soon as they noticed a warning board or an illuminated light. Drivers acquainted themselves with the revised procedures in a test held after the third practice session.

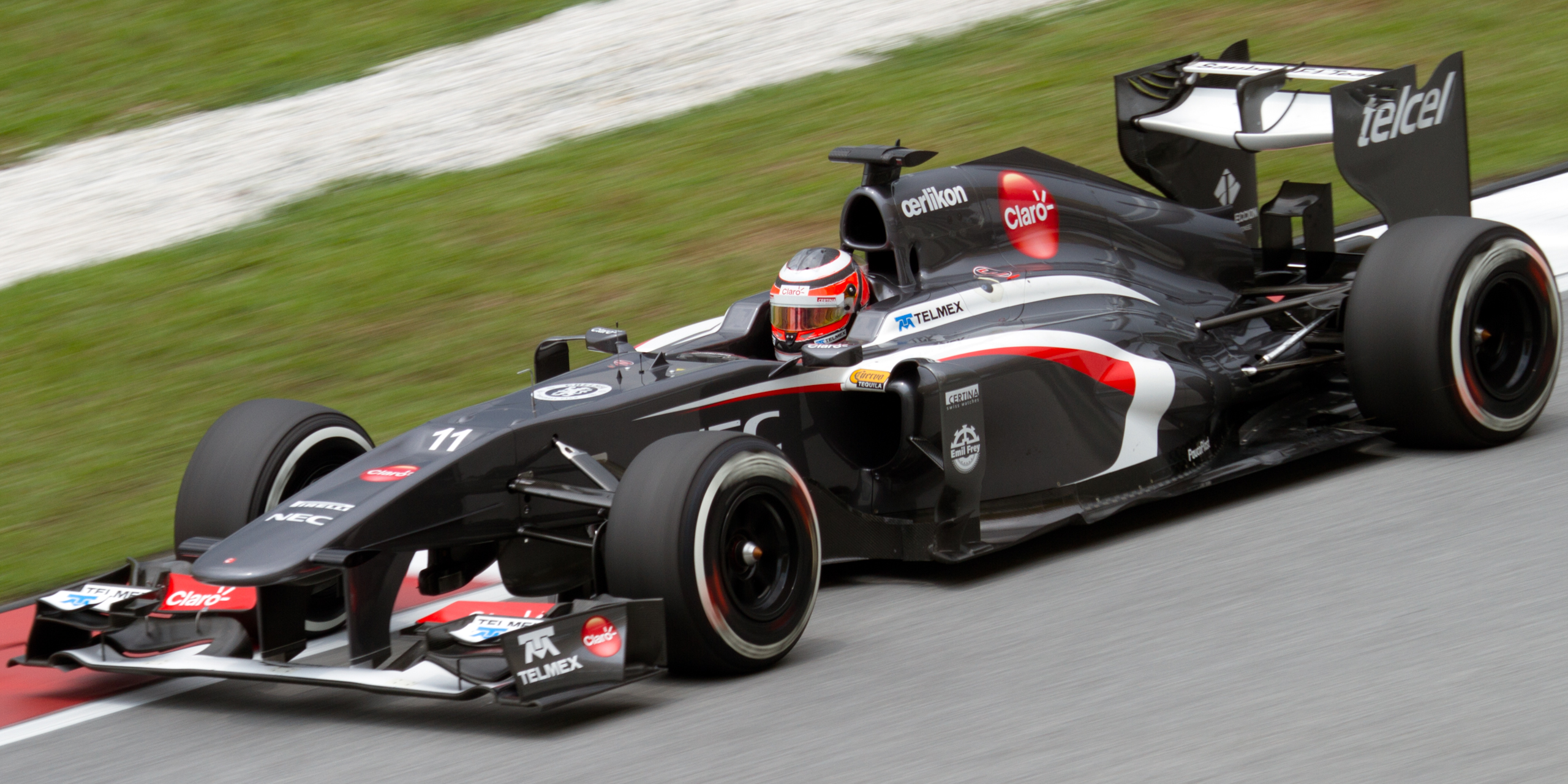
Nico Hülkenberg was given a new C32 chassis by the Sauber team.

Several teams made changes to their cars for the race. Sauber introduced a new C32 chassis for driver Nico Hülkenberg after a fuel-system fault prevented him from starting the Australian Grand Prix. Sauber modified the C32's engine cover to remove hot air from its engine and sidepods, and added a small vertical fin to improve airflow to the car's rear and diffuser's side channels. Red Bull installed extra cooling outlets on the centre of the RB9, to counter Malaysia's warm climate. Ferrari opened the exhausts on the F138 to improve the extraction of warm air from its sidepods. Mercedes changed the turning vanes and pillars under the F1 W04. Lotus introduced a new exhaust system on Räikkönen's E21 car and its endplate, main plane and revised upper flap, in addition to a revised diffuser with a gurney flap.

== Practice ==
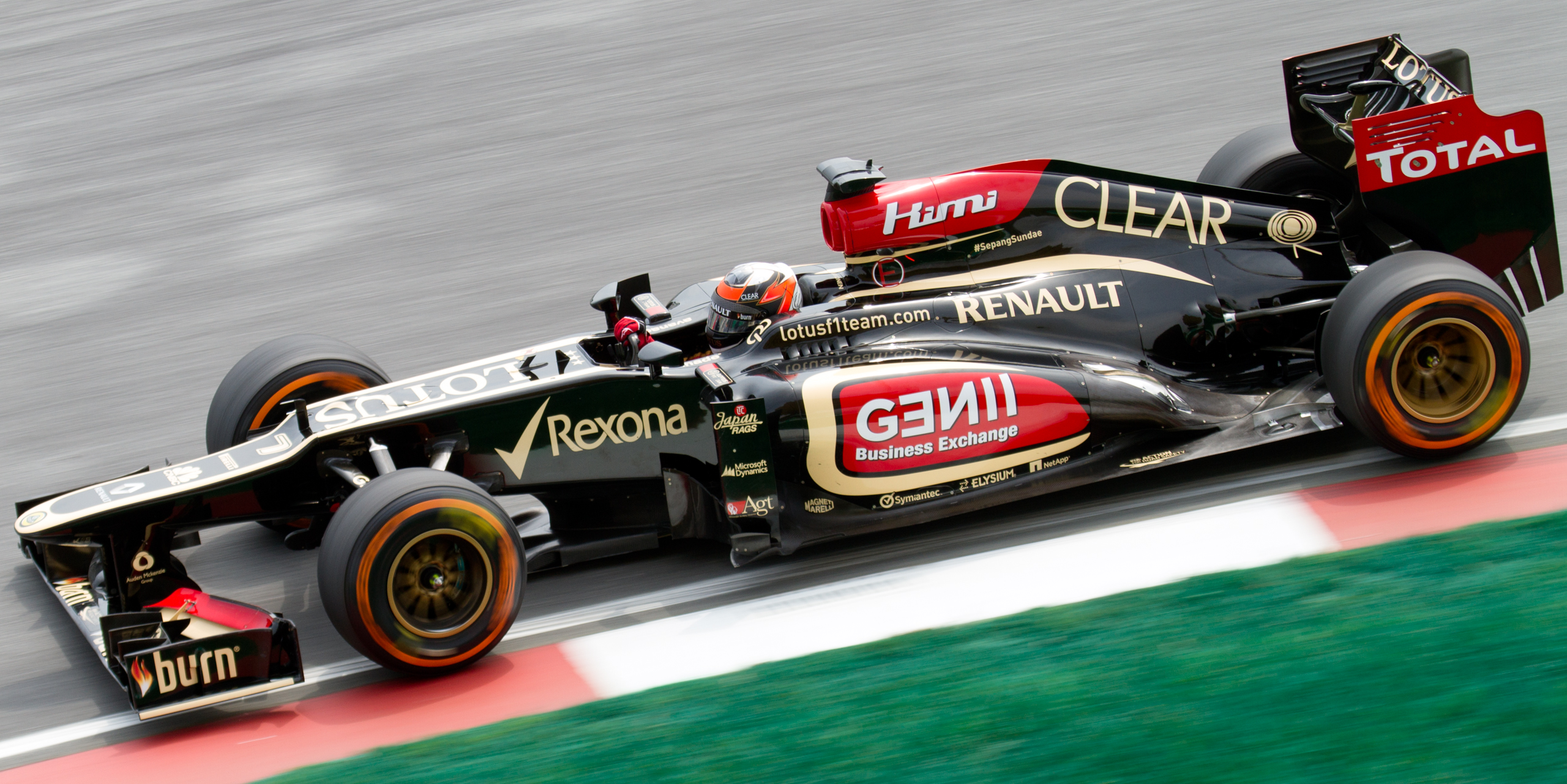
During the first practice session, Kimi Räikkönen was restricted due to a kinetic energy recovery system battery change.

In accordance with the 2013 regulations, three practice sessions were held: two 90-minute sessions on Friday, and another 60-minute session on Saturday. The first practice session was held in hot, humid weather; no driver set a competitive lap time for 34 minutes. Several drivers remained in the pit lane to wait for better track conditions to record their quickest times in a ten-minute period of successive laps, before running a heavy fuel load. Webber's first timed lap (1:37.588) was followed by a 1:37.354 from his teammate Vettel. Webber improved to a 1:36.395 lap to go fastest. Räikkönen missed the first 55 minutes as Lotus replaced a kinetic energy recovery system (KERS) battery which failed due to a sensor problem, but was second-fastest. Vettel, Alonso, Nico Rosberg of Mercedes, Adrian Sutil of Force India, Massa, Paul di Resta, Hamilton and Lotus driver Romain Grosjean were second to tenth. Sutil damaged his front wing on a kerb, and Sauber's Esteban Gutiérrez spun at turn 14.

The second session was also hot and humid; many teams used dry tyres early, due to rain clouds above the track. A heavy rain shower fell, preventing an improvement in lap times; some drivers drove on the wet track on the intermediate-compound tyres, to acclimatise themselves with the conditions if inclement weather returned later in the week. Räikkönen lapped fastest at 1:36.569, followed by Vettel, Massa and Alonso, Webber, Grosjean, Rosberg, Di Resta, Hamilton and Sutil. Some drivers went off the track during the session, due to wetness. Gutiérrez's in-car fire extinguisher activated after mounting the turn-12 kerb, and a subsequent exhaust-system fracture ended his session.

In the final session (also in hot, humid weather), most drivers used hard-compound tyres to see how they would behave during the race, then switched to medium-compound tyres when track grip improved. Räikkönen set a benchmark in the first ten minutes, which Rosberg and Sutil bettered. Rosberg and his teammate, Hamilton, fought for the fastest lap time until Vettel used the medium-compound tyres to lead with a 1:36.435 lap with three minutes to go. Hamilton, Sutil, Webber, Räikkönen, Di Resta, McLaren's Jenson Button, Massa, Rosberg and Alonso were the ten fastest drivers. Near the end of the session, Hamilton's right-front tyre tore a tread after locking the wheel and flat-spotting it to the canvas. Part of the tyre detached on the backstraight, and damaged Hamilton's front wing.

== Qualifying ==
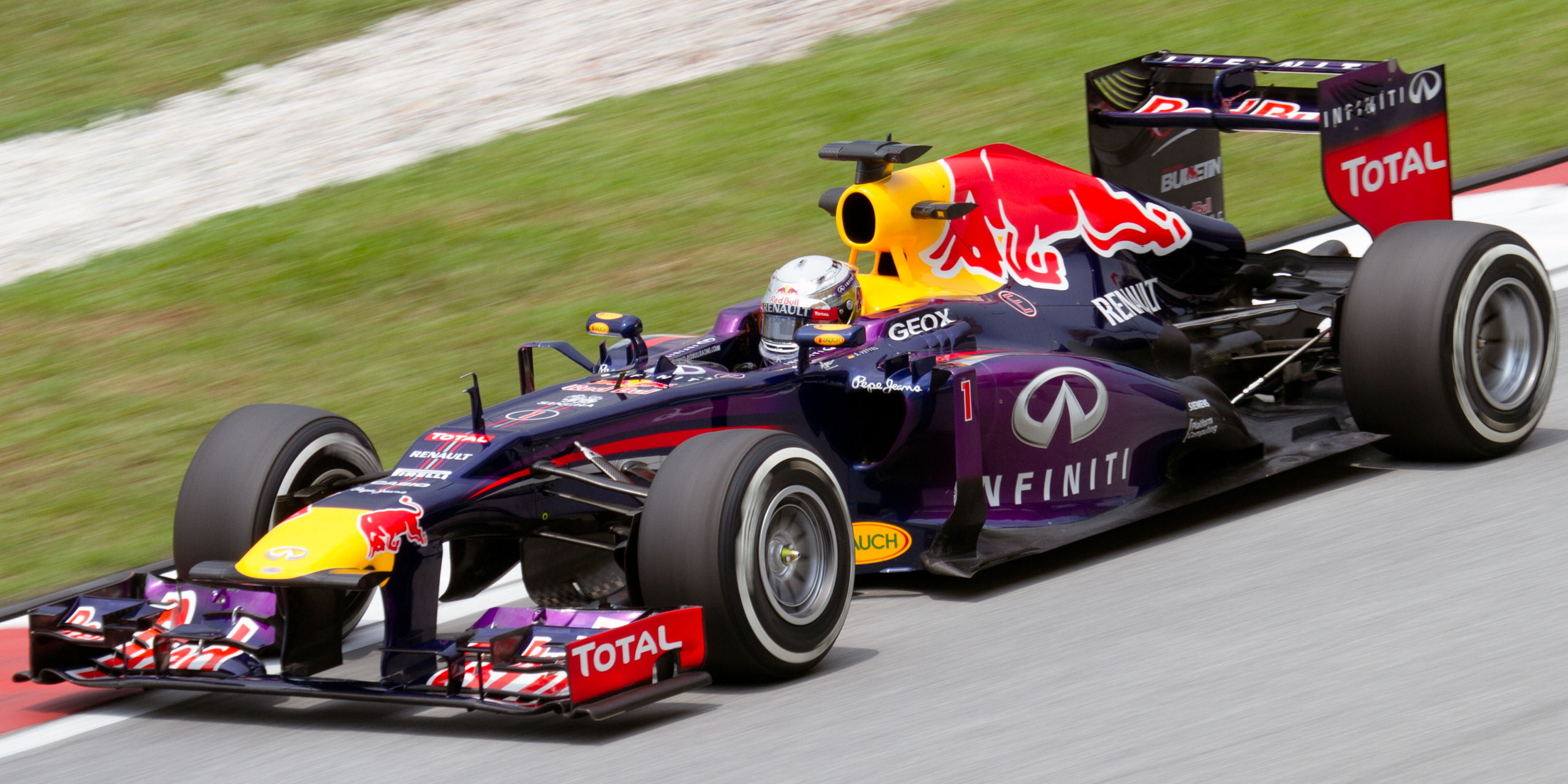
Sebastian Vettel took his second pole position of the season and the 38th of his career.

Saturday afternoon's qualifying session was divided into three parts. The first session lasted 18 minutes, eliminating cars which finished the session 17th or below. The 107% rule was in effect, requiring drivers to reach a time within 107 per cent of the fastest lap to qualify. The second session lasted 15 minutes, eliminating cars that finished 11th to 16th. The final, ten-minute session determined pole position to tenth place. Drivers who progressed to the final session were not allowed to change tyres for the race's start, and used the tyres with which they set their fastest lap times. A sudden downpour five minutes before the end of the second session wet the track from turns five to six, prompting the drivers to switch to intermediate-compound tyres during the session and wet-weather affected the final session. Vettel used a single set of medium-compound tyres in the first and second sessions to prevent tyre overuse. He also used intermediate-compound tyres in the final minutes of the third session to take his second pole position of the season and the 38th of his career with a 1:49.674 lap. Massa started second for the first time since the 2010 Bahrain Grand Prix. and was faster than his teammate, Alonso (in third), for the fourth race in a row. Hamilton used an older set of intermediate tyres in Mercedes' strategy to remain on the circuit, and qualified fourth. Webber took fifth on one set of intermediate tyres; a pit-wall miscommunication at the end of the final session allowed Hamilton past and stopped Webber improving.

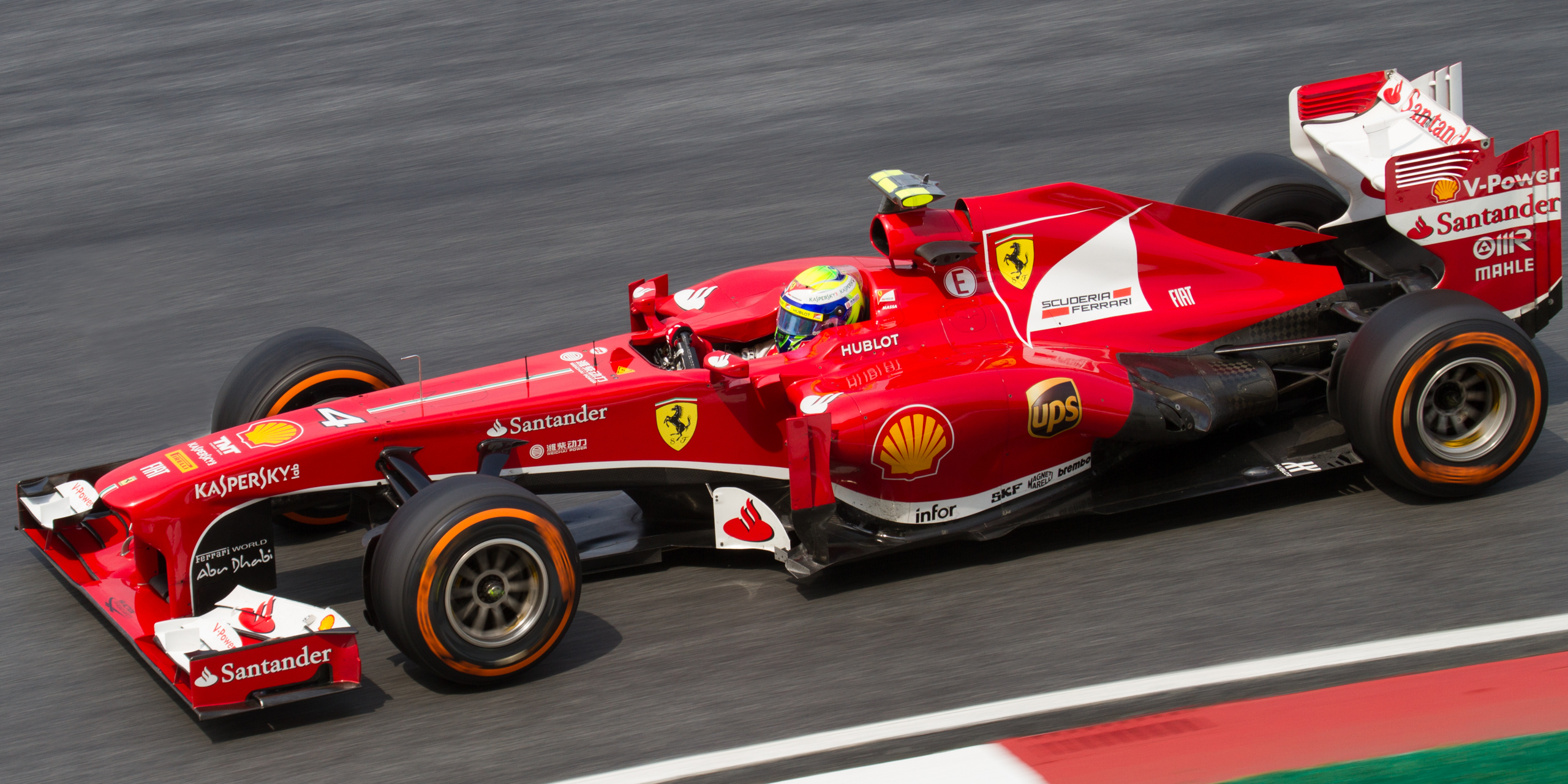
Felipe Massa began from second place for the first time since the 2010 Bahrain Grand Prix.

Rosberg was fastest in the first session, but fell to sixth in the final session on a used set of intermediate tyres. Räikkönen took seventh on a new set of intermediate tyres. A slow pace put Button eighth, an oversteer in the corners left Sutil ninth, and McLaren's Sergio Pérez was tenth. Grosjean, 11th, drove onto the track too late. Hülkenberg, 12th, could not switch from a set of worn medium-compound tyres due to a loss of weather data. A car-balance adjustment put Toro Rosso's Daniel Ricciardo 13th. The rain caught out Gutiérrez in 14th on dry tyres. Di Resta aborted a timed lap due to the rain, prompting Force India to call him to the pit lane for a tyre change. He took 15th, rejoining the track when the rain fell and making two errors. Williams driver Pastor Maldonado, in 16th, set no lap time; he aborted when the rain began. Jean-Éric Vergne's Toro Rosso, 17th, failed to advance beyond the first session after a slower car obstructed him on his lap. Williams' Valtteri Bottas lapped 18th fastest due to poor grip from the medium-compound tyre. Marussia's Jules Bianchi and Max Chilton were 19th and 21st, separated by Charles Pic's Caterham, who had an understeer on his first lap that a pressure adjustment for his second did not remove. Giedo van der Garde, 22nd, was slowed by an oversteer on the medium-compound tyres.

=== Post-qualifying ===
After qualifying, the stewards imposed a three-place grid penalty on Räikkönen after concluding he blocked Rosberg between turns 12 and 15 in the third session. This moved Button to seventh, Sutil to eighth and Pérez to ninth.

=== Qualifying classification ===
The fastest lap in each of the three sessions is in bold.

Pos.	No.	Driver	Constructor	Q1	Q2	Q3	Grid
1	1	(Germany) Sebastian Vettel	Red Bull-Renault	1:37.899	1:37.245	**1:49.674**	1
2	4	(Brazil) Felipe Massa	Ferrari	1:37.712	1:36.874	1:50.587	2
3	3	(Spain) Fernando Alonso	Ferrari	1:37.314	1:36.877	1:50.727	3
4	10	(United Kingdom) Lewis Hamilton	Mercedes	1:37.513	1:36.517	1:51.699	4
5	2	(Australia) Mark Webber	Red Bull-Renault	1:37.619	1:36.449	1:52.244	5
6	9	(Germany) Nico Rosberg	Mercedes	1:37.239	**1:36.190**	1:52.519	6
7	7	(Finland) Kimi Räikkönen	Lotus-Renault	1:36.959	1:36.640	1:52.970	10^{1}
8	5	(United Kingdom) Jenson Button	McLaren-Mercedes	1:37.487	1:37.117	1:53.175	7
9	15	(Germany) Adrian Sutil	Force India-Mercedes	**1:36.809**	1:36.834	1:53.439	8
10	6	(Mexico) Sergio Pérez	McLaren-Mercedes	1:37.702	1:37.342	1:54.136	9
11	8	(France) Romain Grosjean	Lotus-Renault	1:37.363	1:37.636	N/A	11
12	11	(Germany) Nico Hülkenberg	Sauber-Ferrari	1:37.931	1:38.125	N/A	12
13	19	(Australia) Daniel Ricciardo	Toro Rosso-Ferrari	1:37.722	1:38.822	N/A	13
14	12	(Mexico) Esteban Gutiérrez	Sauber-Ferrari	1:37.707	1:39.221	N/A	14
15	14	(United Kingdom) Paul di Resta	Force India-Mercedes	1:37.493	1:44.509	N/A	15
16	16	(Venezuela) Pastor Maldonado	Williams-Renault	1:37.867	No time	N/A	16
17	18	(France) Jean-Éric Vergne	Toro Rosso-Ferrari	1:38.157	N/A	N/A	17
18	17	(Finland) Valtteri Bottas	Williams-Renault	1:38.207	N/A	N/A	18
19	22	(France) Jules Bianchi	Marussia-Cosworth	1:38.434	N/A	N/A	19
20	20	(France) Charles Pic	Caterham-Renault	1:39.314	N/A	N/A	20
21	23	(United Kingdom) Max Chilton	Marussia-Cosworth	1:39.672	N/A	N/A	21
22	21	(Netherlands) Giedo van der Garde	Caterham-Renault	1:39.932	N/A	N/A	22
107% time: 1:43.585

Notes:

- **^1** — Kimi Räikkönen incurred a three-place grid penalty for blocking Nico Rosberg while qualifying.

== Race ==
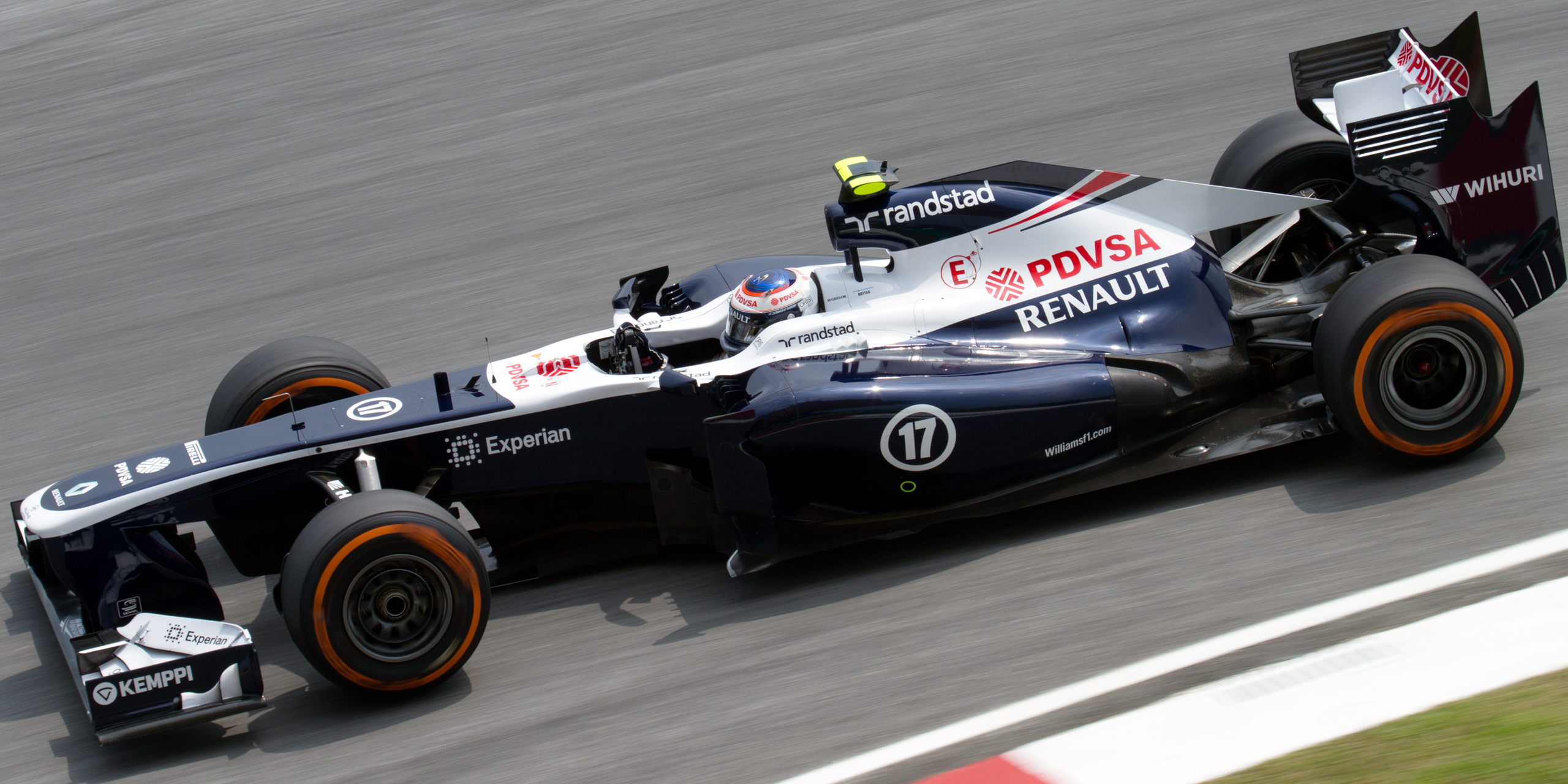
Valtteri Bottas began the race with a new front wing after damaging one on a reconnaissance lap in which he aquaplaned into a gravel trap.

The 56-lap race was held in humid conditions during the afternoon on 24 March. Thunderstorms were forecast, and a 30-minute torrential downpour half an hour before the start made the track wet. The air temperature was 24 to 25 °C (75 to 77 °F), and the track temperature ranged from 27 to 33 °C (81 to 91 °F). 90,000 people were in attendance. Standing water caused light spray and impaired visibility, and all cars used intermediate tyres. Turn three was flooded, causing several drivers to aquaplane into a gravel trap before the race. Bottas damaged his front wing; after an assessment, the Williams team repaired it on the grid. Williams also changed Maldonado's engine the morning of the event due to piston damage in qualifying; Maldonado did not incur a penalty because he switched to another of his eight allocated engines for 2013.

When the five red lights went out to begin the race, Vettel maintained his lead into the first corner. Massa and Alonso veered towards each other behind him, with Hamilton on the left and Webber on the right. Alonso entered turn two in second position, and was surprised by Vettel's perceived early braking. He hit the rear of Vettel's car, which put him wide and damaged his front wing. Webber overtook both Mercedes to move into third place, and battled Alonso for second on the first lap. The left front section of Alonso's front wing scraped the tarmac surface; Alonso did not enter the pit lane since the Ferrari pit wall opted to keep him on the circuit, anticipating that it would not detach. Vettel's car was undamaged. Further down the field, Massa was blocked by other cars and fell from second to sixth. Hülkenberg made a fast start to advance from 12th to ninth, as Pérez moved up from tenth to eighth.

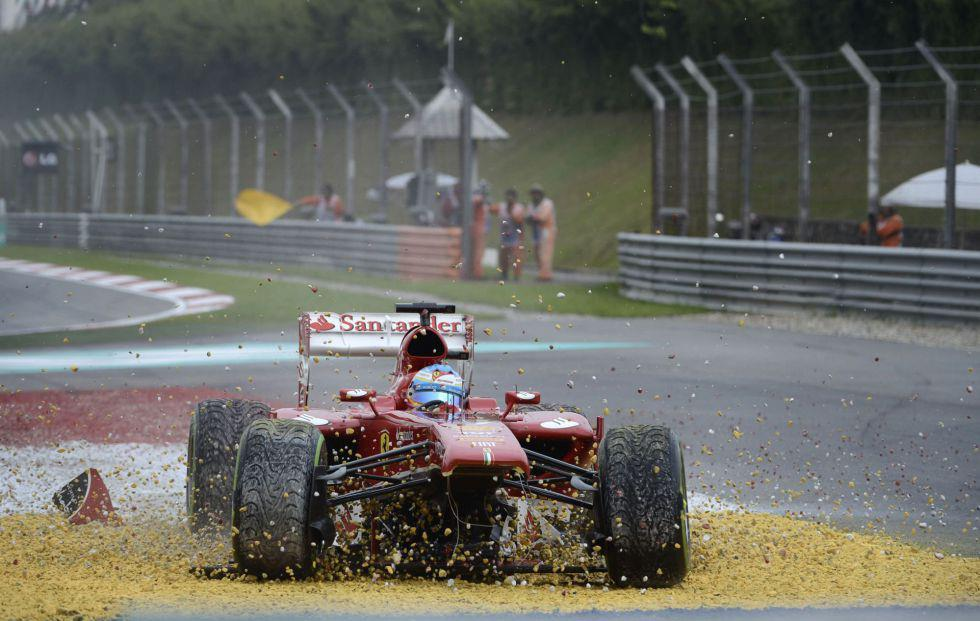
Fernando Alonso retired when his front wing became lodged under his Ferrari and prevented him from steering it.

At the start of lap two, Webber drew alongside Alonso, whose front wing detached and folded under his Ferrari at the end of the main straight, sending him into the turn-one gravel trap. Track stewards refused Alonso's request to extricate his car from the gravel, and he was the race's first retirement. DRS was enabled on the third lap. Rosberg passed Button for fourth on the third lap; Räikkönen tried to pass Ricciardo for tenth at turn one on the next lap, but ran wide and dropped to 12th position. Hülkenberg passed Pérez on the inside for seventh at turn one, and tried unsuccessfully to regain the position on the outside at turn two on lap five. As lap times fell, Vettel made a pit stop from the lead a lap early at the end lap four to switch to medium-compound tyres. He struggled for grip on a damp area, falling behind Pérez, Sutil and Grosjean on lap six, until he drove onto a dry section and overtook Grosjean; Sutil blocked his attempt to pass at turn 13. On lap seven, Vettel overtook Pérez for seventh place.

Webber led laps five to seven, because Red Bull advised him that turn three was too wet for dry tyres and he set a series of fast lap times. His race engineer, Simon Rennie, told him to enter the pit lane at the conclusion of the seventh lap. Hamilton made a pit stop on lap eight. He mistakenly drove into the McLaren pit stall, and the team waved him through to prepare for Button and Pérez's arrival. On that lap, Toro Rosso released Vergne into the path of Pic and they made contact; both drivers had their front wings replaced. The stewards ruled that Vergne was released unsafely into Pic's path and fined the Toro Rosso team $10,000, but Vergne did not incur a post-race time penalty. Rosberg led the eighth lap, until his first stop. After the pit stops, Webber led teammate Vettel and Hamilton. On lap nine, Grosjean passed Ricciardo for ninth position. His teammate, Räikkönen, unsuccessfully attempted to do the same at turn nine. He tried again, and overtook Ricciardo with DRS at the hairpin turn. Two laps later, Grosjean used DRS to pass Pérez for eighth position. On the 12th lap, Räikkönen unsuccessfully tried to pass Pérez for ninth into turn one.

Maldonado, in 12th position, ran on a damp white line at turn 11 on lap 13; he drove across the gravel trap, removing half of his car's front wing. Maldonado recovered to the pit lane without external aid for a replacement front wing, and rejoined the race in 21st place. By lap 15 Webber led teammate Vettel by 2.2 seconds, and Vettel was the same distance ahead of Hamilton in third. This was because Webber was managing the pace but this resulted in Vettel occasionally being backed towards the Mercedes duo. Webber began the second round of pit stops when he entered the pit lane to switch to medium-compound tyres at the end of that lap; he returned to the track in fifth, behind Button. Vettel took the lead and was instructed by his race engineer, Guillaume Rocquelin, to speed up to retain the position. He and Rosberg made their second pit stops at the end of lap 22. Vettel and Rosberg returned to the track in third and fourth place, and Webber returned to the lead. A recurring captive wheel-nut system fault, possibly caused by a high temperature on the left front wheel, lost Sutil 84 seconds in a pit stop, and fell to 20th. Soon thereafter the Force India team called Sutil and his teammate, Di Resta, into retirement because they could not fix the problem before the end of the race and did not want to damage their cars.

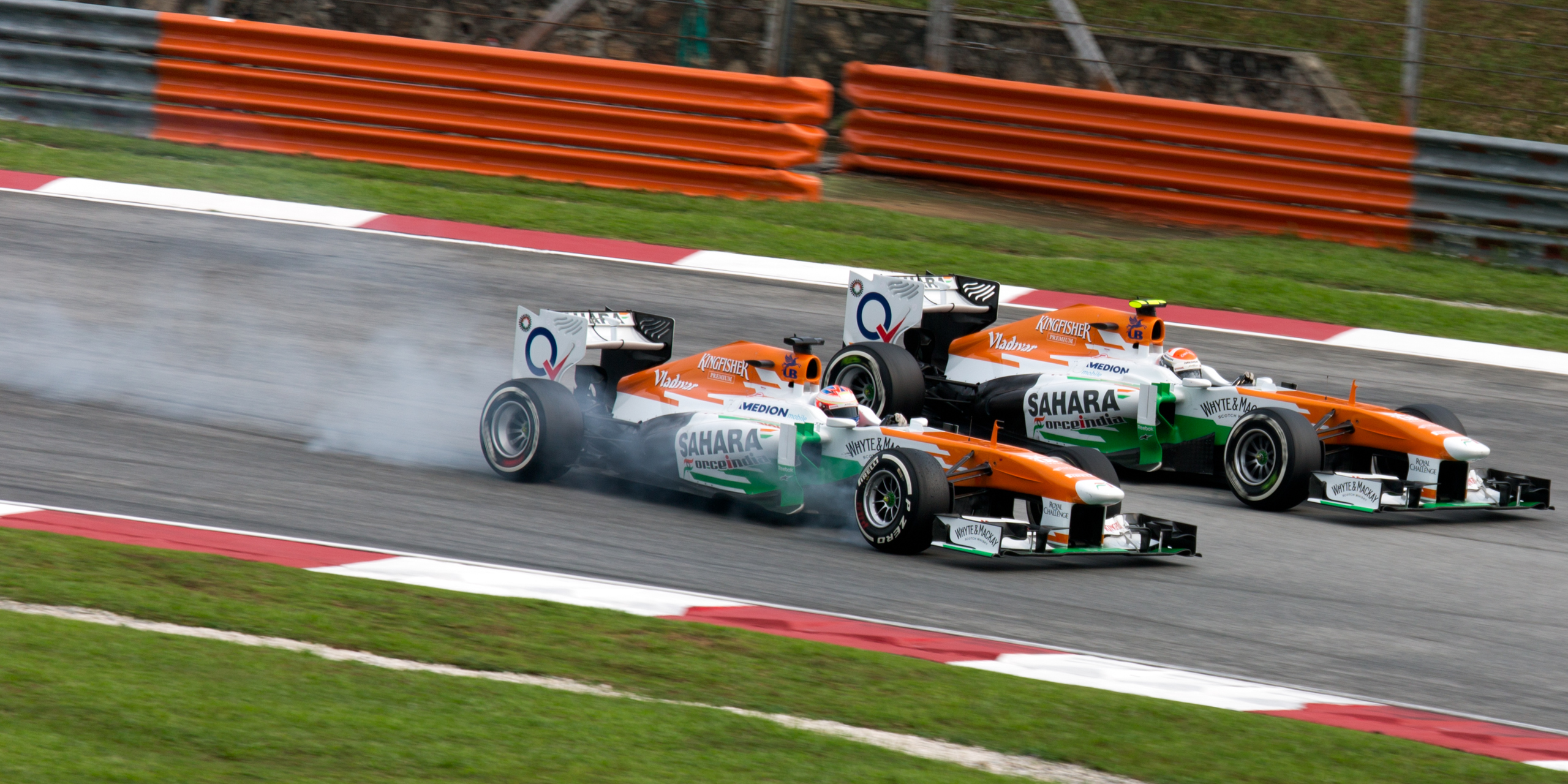
The Force India cars of Paul di Resta and Adrian Sutil were retired less than halfway through the race due to a recurring captive wheel-nut-system failure.

By the end of lap 25, Vettel was less than a second behind teammate Webber and could use DRS to attempt a pass for the lead. The gap to Vettel and Webber was lowered to four-tenths of a second at the start of the next lap, as Hamilton gained on them. Rocquelin told Vettel by radio on that lap to conserve his tyres in high-speed corners, because he drew too close to Webber and was affected by the aerodynamic turbulence of airflow over his teammate's car. Webber also slowed to preserve his tyres so he could reach the third series of pit stops, and Vettel told the Red Bull team by radio to have his teammate relinquish the lead to him because he thought he was the faster driver. On the 29th lap, Webber went faster by three-tenths of a second and pulled away from Vettel.

The third pit-stop phase began on the 30th lap. Hamilton entered the lane to switch to hard-compound tyres, and rejoined the track in fifth place. Webber and Rosberg made their stops on the next lap for hard-compound tyres, and emerged in third and fifth. Vettel led the 32nd lap; he made his stop to prevent him from being undercut by Hamilton since Webber was far ahead to make his stop and remain ahead. Vettel returned in fourth position, behind Hamilton and Webber. Button led laps 33 and 34. Webber unsuccessfully challenged Button for first near the final corner; he then used DRS and out-braked Button to reclaim the lead before turn one of lap 35. On the 36th lap, Button had a problematic pit stop; a fault in the McLaren micro-switch pit-stop lighting system erroneously shone a green light for 120 milliseconds, and Button was released from his pit box before a mechanic could install his right-front wheel. Mechanics pushed Button's car back to the pit stall for the job to be completed. Button lost two minutes in the pit lane, and emerged one lap behind in 14th position. At the front of the field, Hamilton was asked to conserve fuel when Mercedes was unable to adapt to the speed of the faster Red Bull cars; Vettel used DRS into turn one, passing Hamilton for second place on lap 39.

Vettel began to draw clear of Hamilton. On lap 41, Hülkenberg locked his tyres in the final corner and Räikkönen overtook him on the inside for eighth place at turns one and two. Hamilton began the final sequence of pit stops at the end of the lap, and was followed by Rosberg and the Red Bull duo of Webber and Vettel. Webber rejoined the race on an old set of hard-compound tyres, holding off his teammate Vettel through turns one to four to retain the lead. On lap 45, Red Bull invoked team orders on Vettel and Webber, with the code "Multi-Map 21", telling both drivers to lower engine performance and for Webber to remain in first and for Vettel to stay in second position (without challenging each other) to conserve their tyres. Commentator Alex Jacques wrote that the order was invoked because Red Bull had experienced heavy tyre wear in Melbourne and fuel management had become a factor after aggressively going after light vehicles for the race's start. At the end of the lap, Rosberg used DRS to pass teammate Hamilton at the hairpin; Hamilton retook the position before turn one.

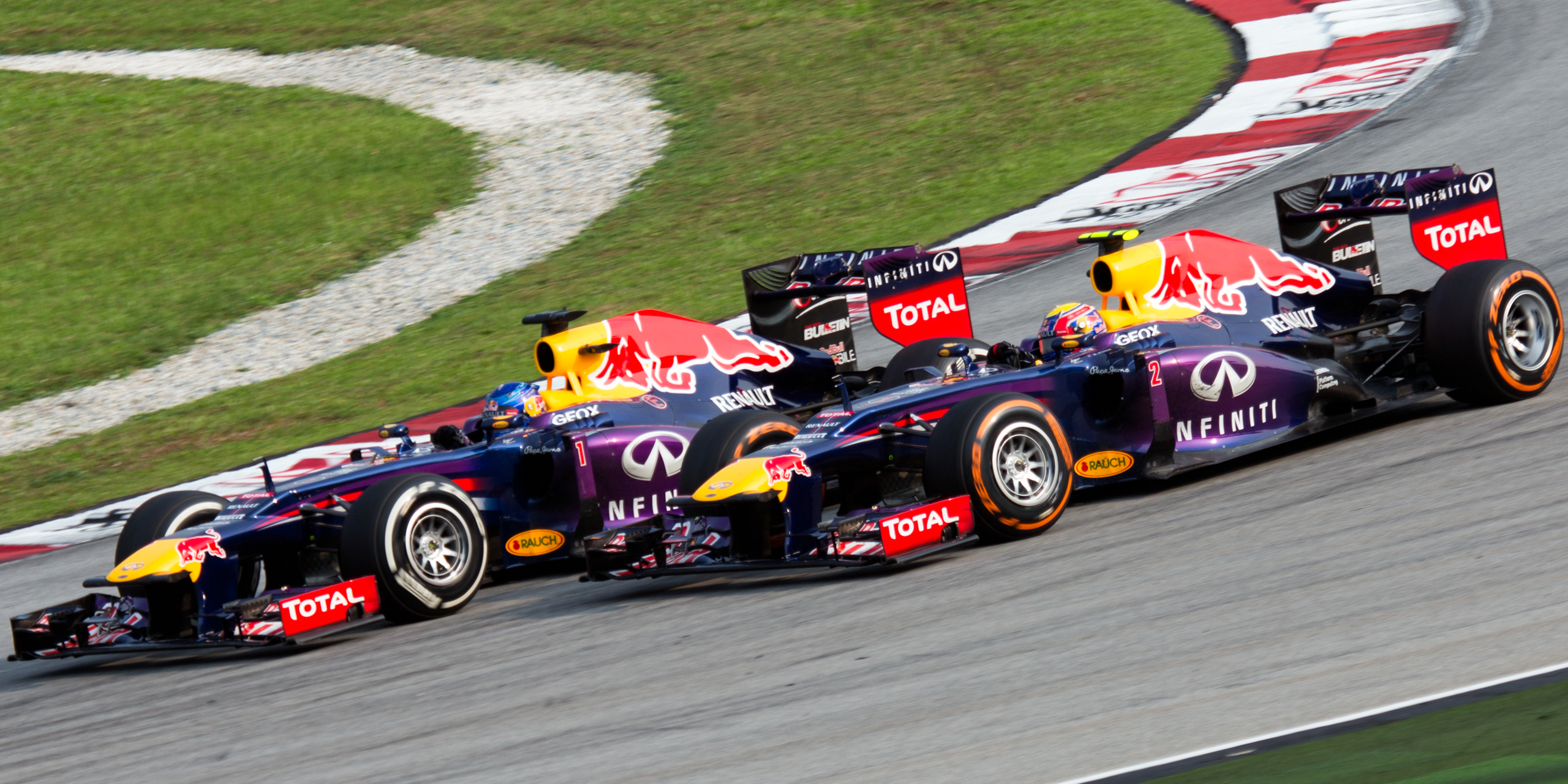
Sebastian Vettel ignored Red Bull team orders, passing Mark Webber for the lead on lap 46 to win the race.

On the 46th lap, Vettel, avenging Webber for forcing him toward the pit wall at the start of the 2012 Brazilian Grand Prix causing him to lose positions and be hit by Williams driver Bruno Senna at turn four, turned right on the first straight and used DRS and KERS. Webber put him towards the pit-lane barrier, with their wheels almost touching at about 180 mph (290 km/h) but the two avoided a collision. Webber used the outside to keep Vettel behind at turn two, placing himself away from the racing line, and Vettel accelerated faster out of turn three. Vettel turned left cresting a hill into turn four, overtaking Webber with better traction for the lead out of the corner. Having repeated the order earlier on, Red Bull team principal Christian Horner reprimanded Vettel by radio while the latter was on the inside of Webber entering turn one: "This is silly, Seb. Come on." At the start of lap 47, Webber tried to pass Vettel into turn one; Vettel placed Webber on the edge of the track to prevent his teammate from driving onto the outside at turn two. On that lap, Maldonado retired with a KERS failure.

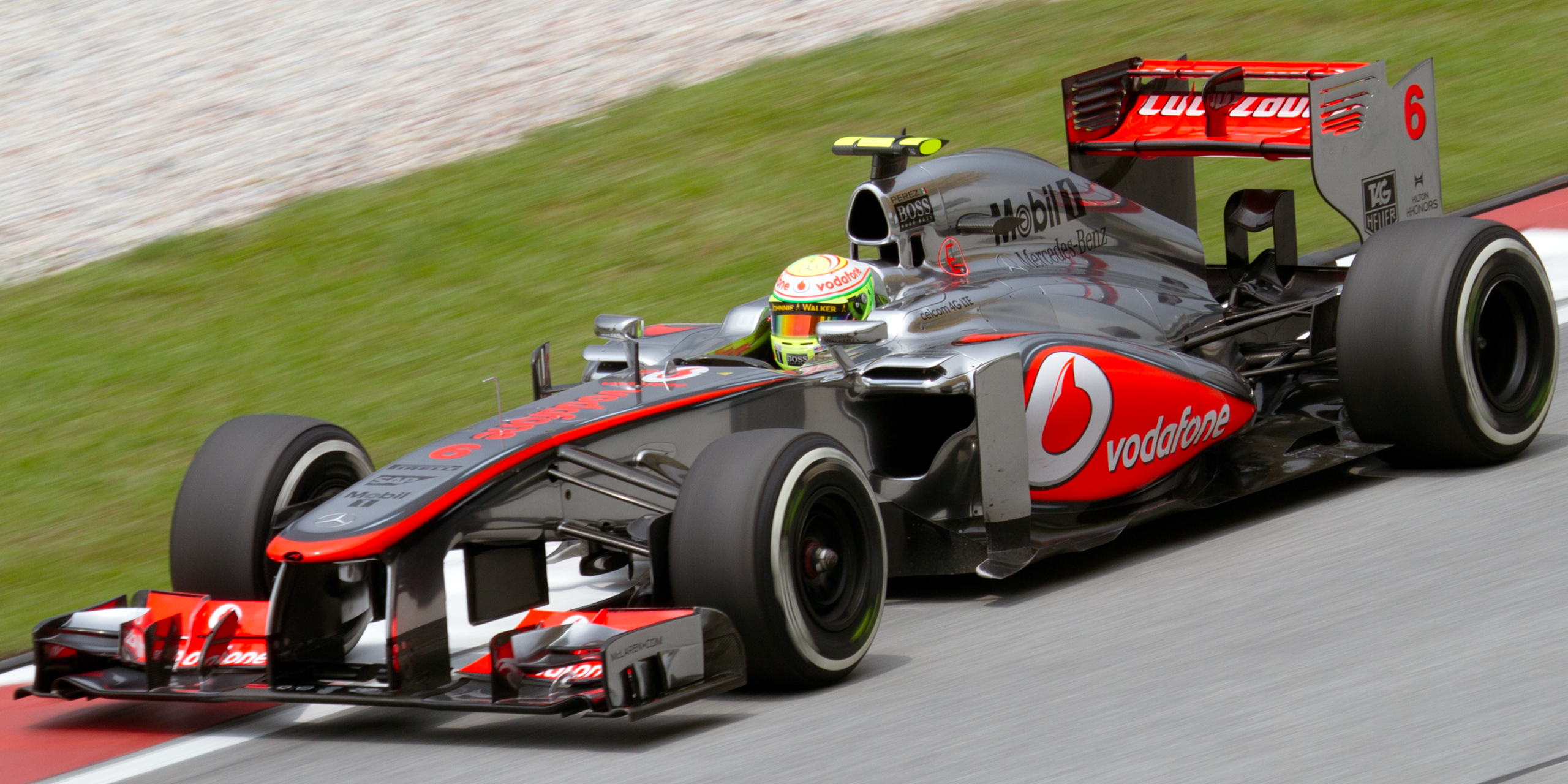
Sergio Pérez finished ninth, driving the race's fastest lap on the final lap.

Massa made a pit stop on the 47th lap to switch to medium-compound tyres when he was unable to pass Grosjean, and emerged in eighth position. Räikkönen passed Pérez on the inside on the hairpin for sixth place on lap 49. Massa then passed Pérez on the first turn for seventh position; Pérez had used DRS to challenge Räikkönen, who was then passed by Massa for sixth. Mercedes' long pursuit of Red Bull resulted in both of their drivers being marginal of fuel, with Hamilton running with less fuel than teammate Rosberg. Rosberg begged Mercedes team principal Ross Brawn to let him pass teammate Hamilton on lap 50; Brawn refused, wanting to ensure that both cars finished the race and trying to control Hamilton's pace to improve his position in the World Drivers' Championship. Brawn wanted Rosberg to drop back to leave some distance and preserve the cars; he did not want both drivers to slipstream each other and overtake one another with DRS, affecting their fuel usage. Two laps later, Ricciardo retired with a faulty exhaust system. Massa then retook fifth from Grosjean on the straight linking the hairpin. On the 55th lap, Button retired with vibration caused by a lock in his left front suspension. That lap, Pérez made a pit stop for hard-compound tyres after Hülkenberg passed him on the inside for eighth place at the fourth corner. He retained ninth place, ahead of Vergne in tenth.

On the final lap, Brawn radioed Hamilton to conserve fuel to finish the race as Rosberg held position. Vettel pulled away from Webber and achieved his first victory of the season and the 27th of his career, which tied him with three-time world champion Jackie Stewart. Webber finished 4.298 seconds later behind in second, and Hamilton took his first podium finish with Mercedes in third. Rosberg and Massa were fourth and fifth, and Grosjean and Räikkönen were sixth and seventh. Hülkenberg took eighth, Sauber's first points of the season. Pérez took ninth, and set the race's fastest lap on the final lap: 1:39.199. Vergne was tenth, and the final finishers were Bottas, Gutiérrez, Bianchi, Pic, Van Der Garde, Chilton, Button and Ricciardo. After the race, Webber turned right and cut across Vettel (who was celebrating with Red Bull on the pitwall) in anger over how his teammate won.

=== Post-race ===
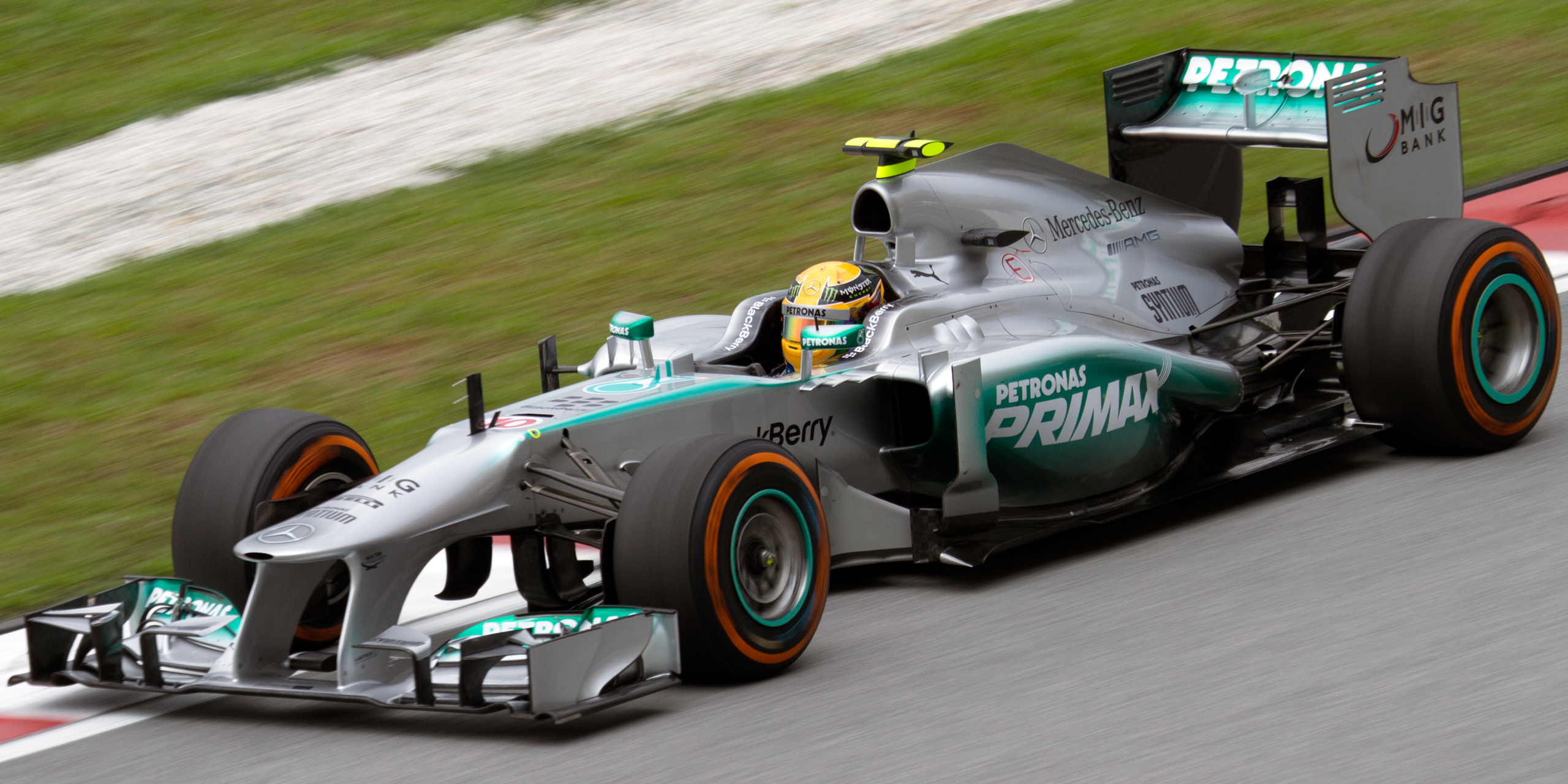
Lewis Hamilton had his first podium finish with the Mercedes team.

Red Bull technical director Adrian Newey told Webber that Vettel was instructed to hold position. Incensed about Vettel's action, Webber considered boycotting the podium ceremony until convinced to do otherwise. In the cool-down room behind the podium, Vettel wanted to speak to Webber, who did not want to communicate with him; he sat on a chair and told Vettel, "Multi 21, Seb. Yeah, Multi 21". Vettel did not reply to the comment. During the podium interviews by commentator Martin Brundle, Vettel said that it was "very close wheel-to-wheel racing" with Webber. Webber said that Vettel made an independent choice to pass him, and would receive protection from Red Bull's management. Hamilton said that his teammate, Rosberg, should have finished third because the latter was faster. During the post-race press conference, Vettel called himself "the black sheep" for prioritising himself over the Red Bull team. Webber said in the final 15 laps, he "was thinking that many things, yes. Many many things" about previous races and the current one. Hamilton said that he would ask Mercedes if he could apologise to his teammate, Rosberg.

After the race, Vettel revealed that he had ignored team orders as an indirect form of revenge for similar behaviour by Webber himself in both of the previous two seasons. Webber had previously disobeyed team orders in Vettel's favour at the 2011 British Grand Prix, where he had been ordered to hold position behind his teammate. Afterwards, he confessed to having ignored "four or five" direct team orders not to attempt a pass, stating that "of course I ignored the team because I wanted to try and get a place." At the Brazilian Grand Prix the following year, Webber hindered his teammate's start by forcing his car towards the wall at the start of the race. When ordered to allow a faster Vettel past 14 laps later, Webber briefly claimed not to understand the meaning of the message, responding to Red Bull's "Multi 12, Multi 12" message by asking "Which switch is that, mate? Which switch, where's the multi?". He did, however allow him past after a brief delay upon being told to "let Sebastian go". Vettel later made clear his intent to continue ignoring team orders that did not fall in his favour, should he be placed in the position to do so again.

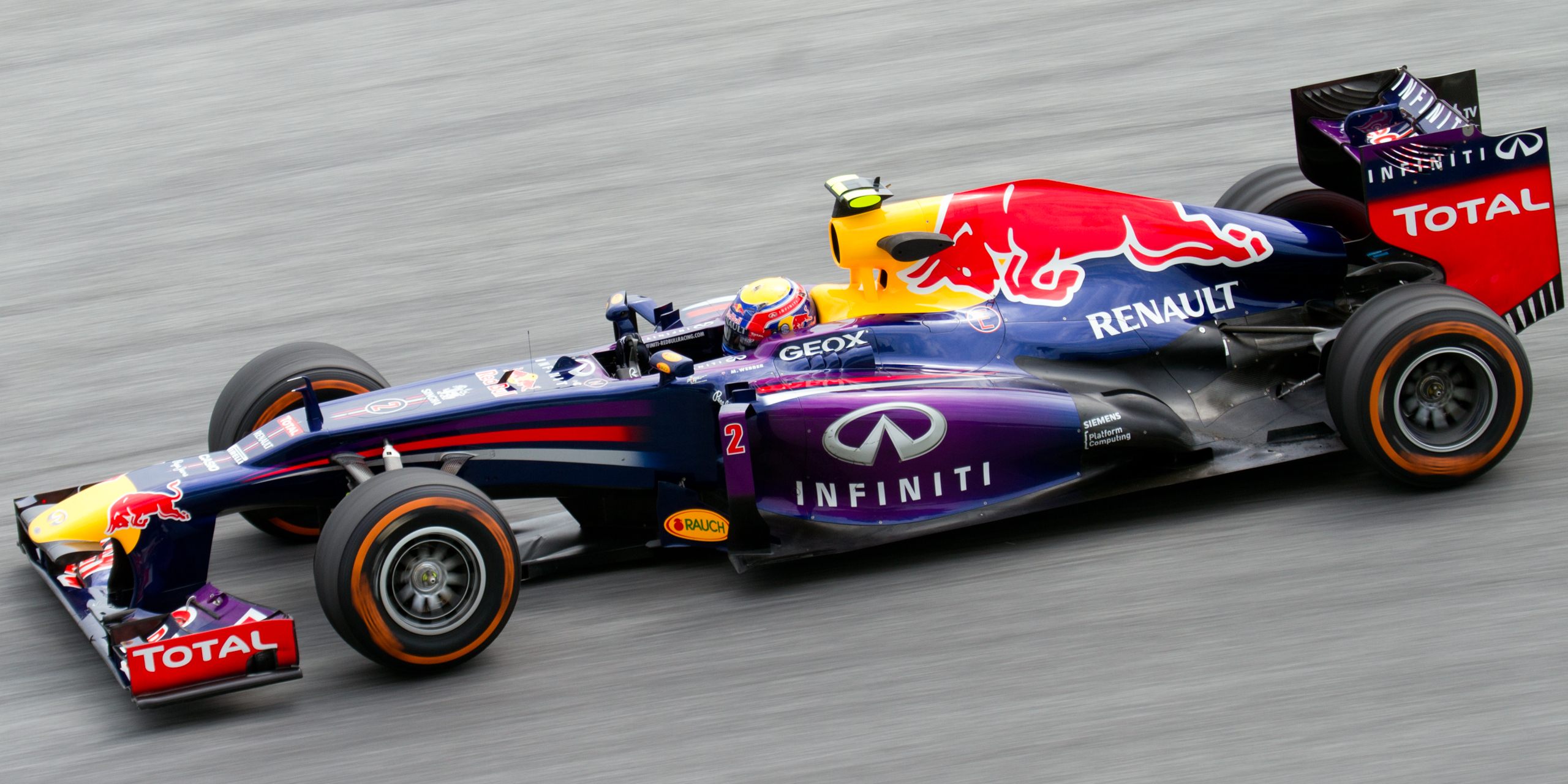
Mark Webber was asked by Red Bull founder and co-owner Dietrich Mateschitz to give an oral and written account of Vettel's actions.

Vettel ignoring team orders was a key moment in his rivalry with Webber, which began when he collided with Webber at the 2010 Turkish Grand Prix and was forced to retire. Horner talked to Vettel and Webber the night after the race, expressing his misgivings about the situation. Vettel flew from Kuala Lumpur to visit the Red Bull team factory in Milton Keynes, England on 26 March to apologise to his colleagues after doing so to Webber at the press conference. According to Horner, Vettel was eager to make up for the wrongdoing and shook hands with Webber: "He can't turn back the clock, but he's accepted what he did was wrong." Red Bull did not reprimand or punish Vettel because his lawyers threatened legal action; he told Webber at the Chinese Grand Prix three weeks later that he was annoyed by his teammate's comments on the podium. In China, at a media session, Vettel recanted his apology for winning: "Obviously I realised at that moment there was quite a conflict. On the one hand I am the kind of guy who respects team decisions and on the other hand, probably Mark is not the one who deserved it (to win) at the time. The bottom line is I was racing, I was faster, I passed him, I won."

While in Australia, Webber received a telephone call from Red Bull owner and co-founder Dietrich Mateschitz, who asked for an oral and written account of events because he was irate about the damage to his company's reputation. Although media reports and comments from the Formula One community speculated about his future at Red Bull and whether reserve driver, Sébastien Buemi, would replace him, Webber dismissed the suggestions and would continue driving for the team for the foreseeable future and talk to Mateschitz about his future later in the year. Webber said in 2020 he believed Vettel might regret the incident, but added that he was not "an angel at certain other events here and there."

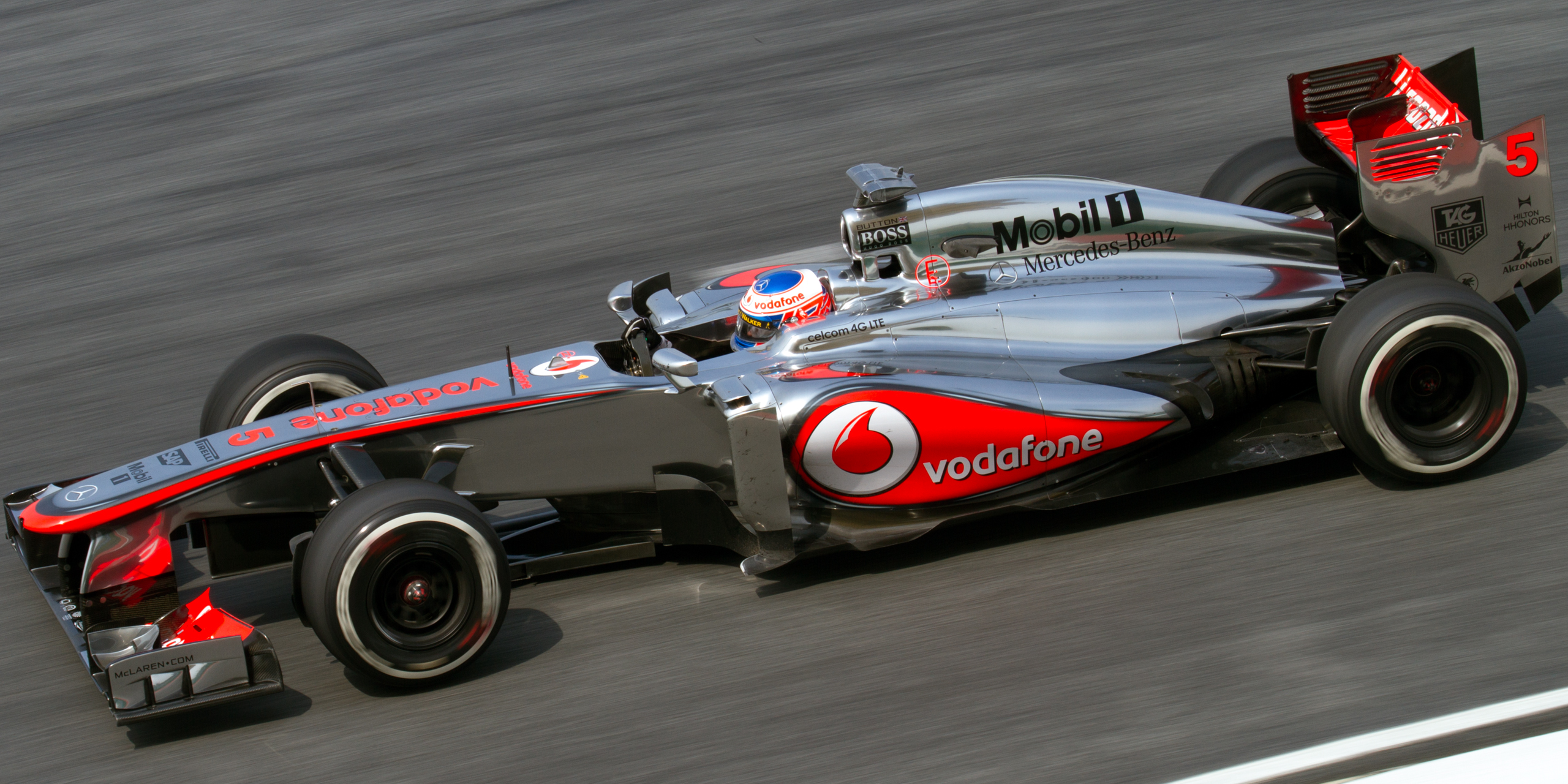
Jenson Button retired with three laps to go with a vibration caused by a lock of his McLaren's left front suspension.

Alonso said that he could have challenged for the victory had he not retired on the second lap due to Ferrari's similar race pace to Red Bull: "No one was especially quick, so I think we could really have fought for the win." According to Button, he could have battled Mercedes for third position on strategy. Although Rosberg begged Ross Brawn to reconsider his decision to maintain position, he respected Mercedes' judgment and finishing third and fourth and duelling Red Bull was "such a milestone". Mercedes motorsport boss Toto Wolff said that Rosberg was unhappy about the situation but understood the decision to hold position: "We are all grown ups and they are grown up. They are professional sportsmen and they understand that sometimes there can be a certain controversy in a certain situation."

The result moved Vettel into the lead of the World Drivers' Championship that he would never relinquish for the rest of the season with 40 championship points, and Räikkönen fell to second place. Webber rose three positions to third place, Hamilton moved to fourth, and Massa dropped from fourth to fifth. Red Bull took the lead of the World Constructors' Championship with 60 championship points. Lotus maintained second place, and Ferrari fell from first to third. Mercedes and Force India retained fourth and fifth place, with 17 races left in the season.

=== Race classification ===
Drivers who scored championship points are denoted in bold.

Pos.	No.	Driver	Constructor	Laps	Time/Retired	Grid	Points
1	1	**(Germany) Sebastian Vettel**	**Red Bull-Renault**	56	1:38:56.681	1	25
2	2	**(Australia) Mark Webber**	**Red Bull-Renault**	56	+4.298	5	18
3	10	**(United Kingdom) Lewis Hamilton**	**Mercedes**	56	+12.181	4	15
4	9	**(Germany) Nico Rosberg**	**Mercedes**	56	+12.640	6	12
5	4	**(Brazil) Felipe Massa**	**Ferrari**	56	+25.648	2	10
6	8	**(France) Romain Grosjean**	**Lotus-Renault**	56	+35.564	11	8
7	7	**(Finland) Kimi Räikkönen**	**Lotus-Renault**	56	+48.479	10	6
8	11	**(Germany) Nico Hülkenberg**	**Sauber-Ferrari**	56	+53.044	12	4
9	6	**(Mexico) Sergio Pérez**	**McLaren-Mercedes**	56	+1:12.357	9	2
10	18	**(France) Jean-Éric Vergne**	**Toro Rosso-Ferrari**	56	+1:27.124	17	1
11	17	(Finland) Valtteri Bottas	Williams-Renault	56	+1:28.610	18	
12	12	(Mexico) Esteban Gutiérrez	Sauber-Ferrari	55	+1 Lap	14	
13	22	(France) Jules Bianchi	Marussia-Cosworth	55	+1 Lap	19	
14	20	(France) Charles Pic	Caterham-Renault	55	+1 Lap	20	
15	21	(Netherlands) Giedo van der Garde	Caterham-Renault	55	+1 Lap	22	
16	23	(United Kingdom) Max Chilton	Marussia-Cosworth	54	+2 Laps	21	
17^{1}	5	(United Kingdom) Jenson Button	McLaren-Mercedes	53	Wheel	7	
18^{1}	19	(Australia) Daniel Ricciardo	Toro Rosso-Ferrari	51	Exhaust	13	
Ret	16	(Venezuela) Pastor Maldonado	Williams-Renault	45	KERS failure	16	
Ret	15	(Germany) Adrian Sutil	Force India-Mercedes	27	Wheel nut	8	
Ret	14	(United Kingdom) Paul di Resta	Force India-Mercedes	22	Wheel nut	15	
Ret	3	(Spain) Fernando Alonso	Ferrari	1	Collision damage	3	

Notes:

- **^1** — Jenson Button and Daniel Ricciardo were classified even though they did not finish the race, as they had completed more than 90% of the race distance.

== Championship standings after the race ==
Drivers' Championship standings

+/–	Pos.	Driver	Points
2	1	(Germany) Sebastian Vettel	40
1	2	(Finland) Kimi Räikkönen	31
3	3	(Australia) Mark Webber	26
1	4	(United Kingdom) Lewis Hamilton	25
1	5	(Brazil) Felipe Massa	22

Constructors' Championship standings

+/–	Pos.	Constructor	Points
2	1	(Austria) Red Bull-Renault	66
	2	(United Kingdom) Lotus-Renault	40
2	3	(Italy) Ferrari	40
	4	(Germany) Mercedes	37
	5	Force India-Mercedes	10

- Note: Only the top five positions are included for both sets of standings.

== See also ==
- 2013 Sepang GP2 Series round

Previous race: 2013 Australian Grand Prix	FIA Formula One World Championship; 2013 season	Next race: 2013 Chinese Grand Prix
Previous race: 2012 Malaysian Grand Prix	Malaysian Grand Prix	Next race: 2014 Malaysian Grand Prix
