= Richard Wood (engineer) =

British Formula One engineer

- Education: University of Strathclyde
- Occupation: Engineer
- Employer: Red Bull Racing
- Known for: Formula One engineer
- Title: Race engineer

Richard Wood is a British Formula One engineer. He is currently the Race Engineer to Isack Hadjar at the Red Bull Racing Formula One team.

== Career ==
Wood studied Mechanical Engineering at the University of Strathclyde. He began his motorsport career at Red Bull Racing through an industrial placement in the team's strategy department, before taking up a permanent analyst role in 2013, contributing to race-strategy preparation, competitor analysis, and the development of in-house analytical tools. After several years supporting race engineering and simulator activities, Wood moved into the Race Engineering department in 2016 as a Race Support Engineer. In this role he worked across test and simulator programmes, assisting with driver development, event preparation, and performance analysis, while acting as a liaison between factory-based groups and trackside operations.

In 2021 he was promoted to Performance Engineer, working with Sergio Pérez through the 2024 season. In this role he focused on car set-up optimisation, simulator correlation and performance analysis, contributing to Pérez's five race victories with the team and his second-place finish in the 2023 World Drivers’ Championship. During the 2024 season Wood also deputised as Pérez's race engineer for several rounds while regular race engineer Hugh Bird was on paternity leave.

He stepped up to a full-time trackside Race Engineer role for the 2025 season. Wood began the campaign engineering Liam Lawson for the opening two rounds before the New Zealander was replaced as part of a mid-season driver reshuffle. From round three onward he worked with Yuki Tsunoda, overseeing all aspects of car performance, set-up direction, session planning and race execution. For the 2026 season, Wood is assigned as a Race Engineer to Isack Hadjar as the French driver steps up to Red Bull for his first full Formula One campaign with the senior team.
