= 2022 São Paulo Grand Prix =

Twenty-first round of the 2022 F1 season

Race 21 of 22 in the 2022 Formula One World Championship
| ← Previous race | Next race → |
- Layout of the Autódromo José Carlos Pace

Race details
- Date: 13 November 2022
- Official name: Formula 1 Heineken Grande Prêmio de São Paulo 2022
- Location: Autódromo José Carlos Pace; São Paulo, Brazil
- Course: Permanent racing facility
- Course length: 4.309 km (2.677 miles)
- Distance: 71 laps, 305.879 km (190.064 miles)
- Weather: Cloudy
- Attendance: 235,000

Pole position
| Driver | (Denmark) Kevin Magnussen (Note: Kevin Magnussen was credited with pole position after qualifying. George Russell started the race in the first position after winning the sprint.) | Haas-Ferrari |
- Time: 1:11.674
- Grid positions set by results of sprint

Fastest lap
| Driver | (United Kingdom) George Russell | Mercedes |
- Time: 1:13.785 on lap 61

Podium
| First | (United Kingdom) George Russell | Mercedes |
| Second | (United Kingdom) Lewis Hamilton | Mercedes |
| Third | (Spain) Carlos Sainz Jr. | Ferrari |

The 2022 São Paulo Grand Prix (officially known as the Formula 1 Heineken Grande Prêmio de São Paulo 2022) was a Formula One motor race that was held on 13 November 2022 at the Interlagos Circuit in São Paulo, Brazil. It was the twenty-first and penultimate round of the 2022 Formula One World Championship and the third and final Grand Prix weekend in the season to utilise the sprint format.

Mercedes driver George Russell took his maiden Grand Prix win with his teammate Lewis Hamilton in second and with Ferrari driver Carlos Sainz Jr. completing the podium in third. This race marked the first time since the 2010 Canadian Grand Prix that British drivers finished first and second in a Grand Prix. The race was also the last before Red Bull Racing started a record-breaking run of 15 consecutive race wins which lasted for 10 months until Carlos Sainz Jr. won the Singapore Grand Prix the next season. This was Russell's and Mercedes's last win until the 2024 Austrian Grand Prix.

== Background ==
The event was held across the weekend of the 11–13 November. It was twenty-first and the penultimate round of the 2022 Formula One World Championship. It was the third and final Grand Prix weekend of the 2022 season to utilise the Formula One sprint format.

=== Safety concerns ===
In the aftermath of the 2022 Brazilian general election on 30 October, a safety concern had been raised over the unrest in the country. Some Brazilians took to the streets of Brazil to protest the election results which prompted disruption of activities in the country. There were reports that team logistic trucks belonging to Ferrari were blocked by protesters while on their way to the circuit from Viracopos International Airport. The political instability in Brazil had raised questions about whether the FIA would decide to cancel the round, or if the race would go ahead as scheduled. Reports indicated that the FIA and Formula One rights holder Liberty Media were monitoring the situation to decide on the fate of the race. On 2 November, Formula One confirmed the event would go ahead.

=== Championship standings before the race ===
Going into the weekend, both the Drivers' and Constructors' titles have already been decided at the Japanese and United States Grands Prix, respectively. Max Verstappen led the Drivers' Championship with 136 points from teammate Sergio Pérez, second, and 141 from Charles Leclerc, third. Red Bull Racing led the Constructors' Championship from Ferrari by 209 points and Mercedes by 249 points.

=== Entrants ===
The drivers and teams were the same as the season entry list with no additional stand-in drivers for the race. Logan Sargeant drove for Williams in place of Alexander Albon, during the second practice session.

=== Tyre choices ===
Tyre supplier Pirelli brought the C2, C3, and C4 tyre compounds (designated hard, medium, and soft, respectively) for teams to use at the event.

== Qualifying ==
=== Qualifying report ===
Qualifying began in wet conditions, with all twenty drivers starting on the intermediate tyres. With eight minutes remaining in the first segment Pierre Gasly became the first driver to switch to dry tyres. These proved to be faster, and all cars would finish the session on the soft tyre, with those who made the switch earlier attaining better lap times.

The second segment of qualifying would remain predominantly dry, showers began at the end of the session and continued into the third segment (Q3). Despite the deteriorating conditions, nine of the ten drivers would start Q3 on dry tyres, with Charles Leclerc on intermediates. Leclerc was much slower on his flying lap than the other cars, eventually abandoning his lap. This also impacted Sergio Pérez, who was stuck behind Leclerc for the whole lap and as a result did not set a representative lap time. Before Pérez and Leclerc could post competitive lap times the Mercedes of George Russell spun into the gravel at turn 4, resulting in a red flag and the postponement of the session. When it resumed ten minutes later, the rain had got much heavier and dry tyres had become unusable. As a result, no driver could set a lap time, meaning Kevin Magnussen took the first pole of his Formula One career, and the first pole for Haas.

=== Qualifying classification ===
| Pos. | No. | Driver | Constructor | Qualifying times | | | Sprint grid |
| Pos. | No. | Driver | Constructor | Q1 | Q2 | Q3 | Sprint grid |
|---|---|---|---|---|---|---|---|
| 1 | 20 | (Denmark) Kevin Magnussen | Haas-Ferrari | 1:13.954 | 1:11.410 | 1:11.674 | 1 |
| 2 | 1 | (Netherlands) Max Verstappen | Red Bull Racing-RBPT | 1:13.625 | 1:10.881 | 1:11.775 | 2 |
| 3 | 63 | (United Kingdom) George Russell | Mercedes | 1:14.427 | 1:11.318 | 1:12.059 | 3 |
| 4 | 4 | (United Kingdom) Lando Norris | McLaren-Mercedes | 1:13.106 | 1:11.377 | 1:12.263 | 4 |
| 5 | 55 | (Spain) Carlos Sainz Jr. | Ferrari | 1:14.680 | 1:10.890 | 1:12.357 | 5 |
| 6 | 31 | (France) Esteban Ocon | Alpine-Renault | 1:14.663 | 1:11.587 | 1:12.425 | 6 |
| 7 | 14 | (Spain) Fernando Alonso | Alpine-Renault | 1:13.542 | 1:11.394 | 1:12.504 | 7 |
| 8 | 44 | (United Kingdom) Lewis Hamilton | Mercedes | 1:13.403 | 1:11.539 | 1:12.611 | 8 |
| 9 | 11 | (Mexico) Sergio Pérez | Red Bull Racing-RBPT | 1:13.613 | 1:11.456 | 1:15.601 | 9 |
| 10 | 16 | (Monaco) Charles Leclerc | Ferrari | 1:14.486 | 1:10.950 | No time | 10 |
| 11 | 23 | (Thailand) Alexander Albon | Williams-Mercedes | 1:14.324 | 1:11.631 | N/A | 11 |
| 12 | 10 | (France) Pierre Gasly | AlphaTauri-RBPT | 1:14.371 | 1:11.675 | N/A | 12 |
| 13 | 5 | (Germany) Sebastian Vettel | Aston Martin Aramco-Mercedes | 1:13.597 | 1:11.678 | N/A | 13 |
| 14 | 3 | (Australia) Daniel Ricciardo | McLaren-Mercedes | 1:14.931 | 1:12.140 | N/A | 14 |
| 15 | 18 | (Canada) Lance Stroll | Aston Martin Aramco-Mercedes | 1:14.398 | 1:12.210 | N/A | 15 |
| 16 | 6 | (Canada) Nicholas Latifi | Williams-Mercedes | 1:15.095 | N/A | N/A | 16 |
| 17 | 24 | (China) Zhou Guanyu | Alfa Romeo-Ferrari | 1:15.197 | N/A | N/A | 17 |
| 18 | 77 | (Finland) Valtteri Bottas | Alfa Romeo-Ferrari | 1:15.486 | N/A | N/A | 18 |
| 19 | 22 | (Japan) Yuki Tsunoda | AlphaTauri-RBPT | 1:16.264 | N/A | N/A | 19 |
| 20 | 47 | (Germany) Mick Schumacher | Haas-Ferrari | 1:16.361 | N/A | N/A | 20 |
107% time: 1:18.223

== Sprint ==
=== Sprint report ===
Magnussen got the best start of the front runners and held the lead for the first two laps. Max Verstappen and Russell engaged in a battle at the start of the race, with Verstappen maintaining second. He overtook Magnussen at the start of lap 3 to take the lead. Magnussen would slip down the order as he struggled to fend off faster cars and finished eighth, the last points-paying position.

The Alpine drivers of Esteban Ocon and Fernando Alonso also engaged in a duel throughout the first lap. At turn 4, Ocon forced Alonso wide in a defensive move, leading to contact and Ocon damaging his right sidepod. As the two continued to run close together, Alonso attempted a move around the outside of turn 14. He moved too late and ran into the back of Ocon damaging his front wing. Alonso would pit two laps later, relegating him to the back of the field, and would receive a five-second penalty for the second contact. Ocon's damage would severely hamper his race and he finished in 17th position, with his car catching fire in the post-race parc ferme.

Lance Stroll was also penalised for a late defensive move on Sebastian Vettel, forcing him off-track. Stroll was awarded a ten-second penalty.

Verstappen, despite being one of only two drivers on the medium tyre, started to experience massive tyre degradation and suspected damage to his undertray due to running over debris caused by the Alonso-Ocon collision, resulting in a drop in pace towards the midway point of the race. Russell caught up to him on lap 12, and passed him on lap 15. Three laps later Carlos Sainz Jr. also passed him. After making the move he made contact with Verstappen, damaging Verstappen's front wing. The Red Bull Racing driver would be passed by Lewis Hamilton one lap later and would hold on to fourth until the end of the race.

=== Sprint classification ===
| Pos. | No. | Driver | Constructor | Laps | Time/Retired | Grid | Points | Final grid |
|---|---|---|---|---|---|---|---|---|
| 1 | 63 | (United Kingdom) George Russell | Mercedes | 24 | 30:11.307 | 3 | 8 | 1 |
| 2 | 55 | (Spain) Carlos Sainz Jr. | Ferrari | 24 | +3.995 | 5 | 7 | 7^{a} |
| 3 | 44 | (United Kingdom) Lewis Hamilton | Mercedes | 24 | +4.492 | 8 | 6 | 2 |
| 4 | 1 | (Netherlands) Max Verstappen | Red Bull Racing-RBPT | 24 | +10.494 | 2 | 5 | 3 |
| 5 | 11 | (Mexico) Sergio Pérez | Red Bull Racing-RBPT | 24 | +11.855 | 9 | 4 | 4 |
| 6 | 16 | (Monaco) Charles Leclerc | Ferrari | 24 | +13.133 | 10 | 3 | 5 |
| 7 | 4 | (United Kingdom) Lando Norris | McLaren-Mercedes | 24 | +25.624 | 4 | 2 | 6 |
| 8 | 20 | (Denmark) Kevin Magnussen | Haas-Ferrari | 24 | +28.768 | 1 | 1 | 8 |
| 9 | 5 | (Germany) Sebastian Vettel | Aston Martin Aramco-Mercedes | 24 | +30.218 | 13 | | 9 |
| 10 | 10 | (France) Pierre Gasly | AlphaTauri-RBPT | 24 | +34.170 | 12 | | 10 |
| 11 | 3 | (Australia) Daniel Ricciardo | McLaren-Mercedes | 24 | +39.395 | 14 | | 11 |
| 12 | 47 | (Germany) Mick Schumacher | Haas-Ferrari | 24 | +41.159 | 20 | | 12 |
| 13 | 24 | (China) Zhou Guanyu | Alfa Romeo-Ferrari | 24 | +41.763 | 17 | | 13 |
| 14 | 77 | (Finland) Valtteri Bottas | Alfa Romeo-Ferrari | 24 | +42.338 | 18 | | 14 |
| 15 | 22 | (Japan) Yuki Tsunoda | AlphaTauri-RBPT | 24 | +50.306 | 19 | | PL^{b} |
| 16 | 18 | (Canada) Lance Stroll | Aston Martin Aramco-Mercedes | 24 | +50.700^{c} | 15 | | 15 |
| 17 | 31 | (France) Esteban Ocon | Alpine-Renault | 24 | +51.756 | 6 | | 16 |
| 18 | 14 | (Spain) Fernando Alonso | Alpine-Renault | 24 | +53.985^{d} | 7 | | 17 |
| 19 | 6 | (Canada) Nicholas Latifi | Williams-Mercedes | 24 | +1:16.850 | 16 | | 18 |
| Ret | 23 | (Thailand) Alexander Albon | Williams-Mercedes | 12 | Undertray | 11 | | 19 |
Fastest lap: (United Kingdom) George Russell (Mercedes) – 1:14.233 (lap 4)

Notes

- ^a – Carlos Sainz Jr. received a five-place grid penalty for exceeding his quota of power unit elements.
- ^b – Yuki Tsunoda was due to start 15th, but he was required to start the race from the pit lane due to modifications to the floor, front wing and rear wing.
- ^c – Lance Stroll finished 12th, but he received a ten-second time penalty for a dangerous manoeuvre on Sebastian Vettel.
- ^d – Fernando Alonso finished 15th on track, but he received a post-sprint five-second time penalty for causing a collision with Esteban Ocon.

== Race ==
=== Race report ===
The frontrunners all got a fairly even start, with Lando Norris the only driver in the top seven to gain a position on the opening lap. At turn 7, Daniel Ricciardo hit the back of Magnussen, spinning the latter who then rolled backwards and made a second contact with Ricciardo's McLaren, ending both of their races and triggering a safety car. Ricciardo was awarded a three-place grid penalty for the next race, the Abu Dhabi Grand Prix.

After the race resumed, two more incidents occurred in quick succession. The first involved Verstappen and Hamilton, and the second Norris and Leclerc. Hamilton dropped to eighth, both Verstappen and Leclerc pitted for new front wings, and Norris continued in third. Both Norris and Verstappen were given a five-second time penalty for their respective incidents.

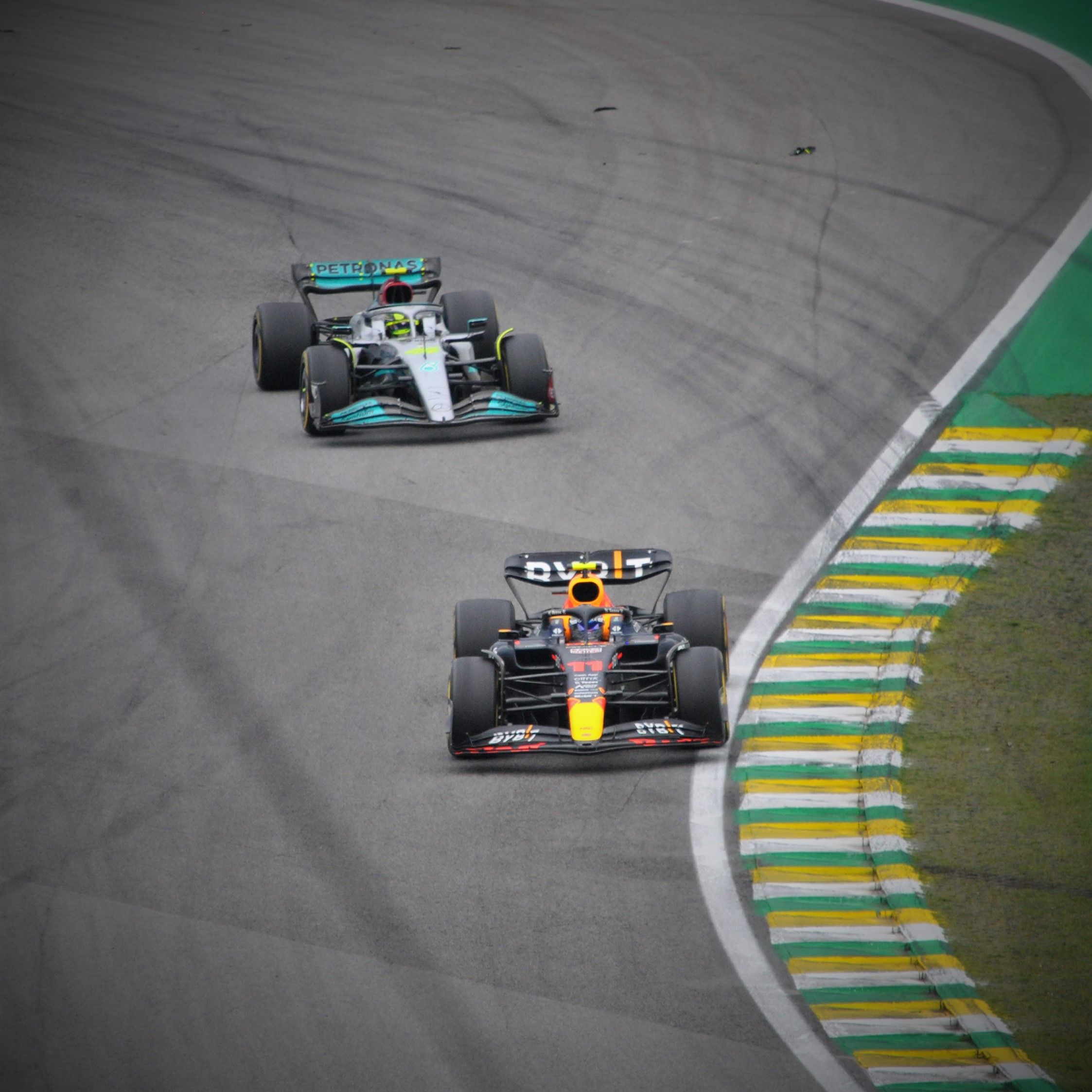
Sergio Pérez leads Lewis Hamilton

Russell built a three-second gap to Sergio Pérez after the first round of pit stops, with a further seven seconds to Sainz in third and Hamilton in fourth. Sainz was switched to a three-stop strategy after an early first stop due to a visor tear-off getting caught in his rear right brake duct. This allowed him to undercut Pérez for second, with the Red Bull driver having already been passed by Hamilton three laps prior.

Norris retired on lap 53 after a gearbox failure, creating a virtual safety car and then a full safety car, giving Sainz and Alonso, the only two drivers on a three-stop strategy, a chance to lose less time in their pit stops for fresh tyres. When the race resumed, Sainz made his way back to third but failed to catch either Mercedes, while Alonso went from ninth to fifth.

George Russell won his first Formula One Grand Prix, leading Lewis Hamilton across the line in Mercedes's first 1–2 finish since the 2020 Emilia Romagna Grand Prix and their 59th overall. It was also the first time two British drivers had finished a Grand Prix first and second since Hamilton and Jenson Button at the 2010 Canadian Grand Prix. Carlos Sainz finished third for his ninth podium of the season. At the conclusion of the race, Alfa Romeo was investigated for a pit lane incident involving Mick Schumacher. The stewards determined that a team member was unreasonably close to the path of the approaching Haas car which was starting its pit stop and fined the team €1,000.

=== Red Bull Racing team orders ===
With Pérez falling down the order after the second safety car restart, his Red Bull Racing teammate, Verstappen, was given permission to pass him in order to overtake Fernando Alonso's Alpine. After failing to overtake Alonso, Verstappen was told by his engineer, Gianpiero Lambiase, to give the position back to Pérez, to assist Pérez in taking second in the Drivers' Championship. Verstappen refused to comply with team orders and told Lambiase not to ask him to do such a thing again, stating that he had his "reasons" to defy such orders, and that he had discussed those reasons with the team before.

After the end of the race, Pérez expressed his frustration to team principal Christian Horner, saying Verstappen has shown "who he really is" and also told the media that Verstappen won two championships because of his contributions. Horner and team advisor Helmut Marko expressed their disapproval with Verstappen's decision to defy team orders and warned him that he needs to help Pérez regain second place in the championship at the final race, the Abu Dhabi Grand Prix. Many media speculated that the reason for Verstappen refusing the team order was due to Pérez's crash at the Portier corner during the last minutes of qualifying for the Monaco Grand Prix, which caused a red flag, costing other drivers, including Verstappen, a chance to improve their grid positions. It has been alleged that Pérez crashed deliberately and that Verstappen ignored team orders in retaliation, having previously warned the team to not give Pérez an advantageous team order. When asked by media about the incident in Monaco, Verstappen refused to give any comment.

=== Race classification ===
| Pos. | No. | Driver | Constructor | Laps | Time/Retired | Grid | Points |
|---|---|---|---|---|---|---|---|
| 1 | 63 | (United Kingdom) George Russell | Mercedes | 71 | 1:38:34.044 | 1 | 26^{1} |
| 2 | 44 | (United Kingdom) Lewis Hamilton | Mercedes | 71 | +1.529 | 2 | 18 |
| 3 | 55 | (Spain) Carlos Sainz Jr. | Ferrari | 71 | +4.051 | 7 | 15 |
| 4 | 16 | (Monaco) Charles Leclerc | Ferrari | 71 | +8.441 | 5 | 12 |
| 5 | 14 | (Spain) Fernando Alonso | Alpine-Renault | 71 | +9.561 | 17 | 10 |
| 6 | 1 | (Netherlands) Max Verstappen | Red Bull Racing-RBPT | 71 | +10.056 | 3 | 8 |
| 7 | 11 | (Mexico) Sergio Pérez | Red Bull Racing-RBPT | 71 | +14.080 | 4 | 6 |
| 8 | 31 | (France) Esteban Ocon | Alpine-Renault | 71 | +18.690 | 16 | 4 |
| 9 | 77 | (Finland) Valtteri Bottas | Alfa Romeo-Ferrari | 71 | +22.552 | 14 | 2 |
| 10 | 18 | (Canada) Lance Stroll | Aston Martin Aramco-Mercedes | 71 | +23.552 | 15 | 1 |
| 11 | 5 | (Germany) Sebastian Vettel | Aston Martin Aramco-Mercedes | 71 | +26.183 | 9 | |
| 12 | 24 | (China) Zhou Guanyu | Alfa Romeo-Ferrari | 71 | +29.325 | 13 | |
| 13 | 47 | (Germany) Mick Schumacher | Haas-Ferrari | 71 | +29.899 | 12 | |
| 14 | 10 | (France) Pierre Gasly | AlphaTauri-RBPT | 71 | +31.867^{2} | 10 | |
| 15 | 23 | (Thailand) Alexander Albon | Williams-Mercedes | 71 | +36.016 | 19 | |
| 16 | 6 | (Canada) Nicholas Latifi | Williams-Mercedes | 71 | +37.038 | 18 | |
| 17 | 22 | (Japan) Yuki Tsunoda | AlphaTauri-RBPT | 70 | +1 lap | PL | |
| Ret | 4 | (United Kingdom) Lando Norris | McLaren-Mercedes | 50 | Gearbox | 6 | |
| Ret | 20 | (Denmark) Kevin Magnussen | Haas-Ferrari | 0 | Collision | 8 | |
| Ret | 3 | (Australia) Daniel Ricciardo | McLaren-Mercedes | 0 | Collision | 11 | |
Fastest lap: (United Kingdom) George Russell (Mercedes) – 1:13.785 (lap 61)

Notes

- ^1 – Includes one point for fastest lap.
- ^2 – Pierre Gasly finished 12th, but he received a five-second time penalty for speeding in the pit lane.

== Championship standings after the race ==
Drivers' Championship standings

| | Pos. | Driver | Points |
|---|---|---|---|
| | 1 | (Netherlands) **Max Verstappen** | 429 |
| 1 | 2 | (Monaco) Charles Leclerc | 290 |
| 1 | 3 | (Mexico) Sergio Pérez | 290 |
| | 4 | (United Kingdom) George Russell | 265 |
| | 5 | (United Kingdom) Lewis Hamilton | 240 |

Constructors' Championship standings

| Pos. | Constructor | Points |
|---|---|---|
| 1 | (Austria) **Red Bull Racing-RBPT** | 719 |
| 2 | (Italy) Ferrari | 524 |
| 3 | (Germany) Mercedes | 505 |
| 4 | (France) Alpine-Renault | 167 |
| 5 | (United Kingdom) McLaren-Mercedes | 148 |

- Note: Only the top five positions are included for both sets of standings.
- **Bold text** indicates 2022 World Champions.

== Notes ==
| Previous race: 2022 Mexico City Grand Prix | FIA Formula One World Championship; 2022 season | Next race: 2022 Abu Dhabi Grand Prix |
| Previous race: 2021 São Paulo Grand Prix | São Paulo Grand Prix | Next race: 2023 São Paulo Grand Prix |
