= Simon Rennie =

British racing engineer

- Born: 29 April 1980 (age 45); Northallerton, England
- Occupation: Race engineer
- Known for: Formula One; (Renault F1, Red Bull Racing)

Simon Rennie (born 29 April 1980) is an English motor racing engineer. He currently is the Group Leader of Simulation Engineering at Red Bull Racing.

== Career ==
Rennie was born in Northallerton, North Yorkshire, and began working for the Renault F1 Team in 2004. 2005 saw him acting as the Data Engineer for the winner of the 2005 World Driver's Championship, Spanish driver Fernando Alonso. Alonso and Renault retained the titles they won in 2005 in the 2006 season.

For the 2007 season Rennie was placed in the same role, this time with Finnish driver Heikki Kovalainen, who arrived at Renault after the departure of Alonso.

In 2008, Rennie remained as a data engineer at Renault. He worked alongside the returning Alonso, who came back to the team after placing 2nd at McLaren. Alonso and Renault won back-to-back victories in the now infamous Singapore race and in Japan two weeks later.

The 2009 season saw Rennie promoted to race engineer to Fernando Alonso. The team failed to reach the race winning success of the previous year. Renault's year was dominated by the Crashgate scandal, where they were accused, and found guilty, of fixing the race in Singapore the previous season.

For the second successive season, he remained in his position in the Renault F1 team for the 2010 season, who had been going through major changes in leadership, personnel and sponsorship. He acted as the race engineer for Polish driver Robert Kubica.

Rennie would have acted as race engineer to Kubica in the 2011 Formula One season, for the newly renamed Renault team, Lotus Renault F1, had it not been for a Rallying incident in Italy, one month before the season opener in Bahrain, which resulted in Kubica being sidelined with multiple fractures and a partially severed right hand. Rennie was race engineer to German driver Nick Heidfeld, who was acting as the replacement for Kubica during his recovery, for the 2011 season; when Heidfeld was replaced midseason by Bruno Senna, Rennie was Senna's race engineer as well.

During 2012, he was one of two race engineers for Kimi Räikkönen. The other of Räikkönen's engineers was Mark Slade. During the Abu Dhabi Grand Prix, Rennie told Räikkönen on the team radio about the advantage Räikkönen had over second-placed Fernando Alonso in the Ferrari and he would keep him updated on the Spaniard's pace. The Finn responded on the radio by saying "Leave me alone, I know what to do". The message has received wide media coverage and was well received by the fans. Lotus team principal Eric Boullier said the message "has become a Formula One classic".

For the 2013 season Rennie joined the defending Drivers' and Constructor's champions Red Bull Racing to replace Mark Webber's long time race engineer Ciaron Pilbeam while Pilbeam took over as chief engineer for Räikkönen at Lotus for 2013, their roles effectively replacing each other. After Webber's retirement, Rennie went on to work with Daniel Ricciardo in 2014. In 2019, Rennie moved to a factory role within the Red Bull team, considered to be a factor in Ricciardo's departure from the team that year. He was replaced as race engineer by Mike Lugg.

In 2020, Rennie returned to trackside action at Red Bull to become Alexander Albon's race engineer, replacing Lugg. Lugg was replaced on Albon's demand because he wanted "a more experienced engineer".

In 2021, Rennie stepped aside as Race Engineer, with Hugh Bird taking over as Race Engineer for Albon's replacement Sergio Pérez.

In 2025, Rennie returned twice for trackside action during the Austrian Grand Prix and Belgian Grand Prix. In both cases, he stepped in as Max Verstappen's race engineer, replacing Gianpiero Lambiase for the weekends, he also took on Lambiase's responsibilities as Head of Racing due to Lambiase's absence for personal reasons in both instances.
