= Gianpiero Lambiase =

British engineer (born 1980)

- Lambiase in 2025
- Born: 14 October 1980 (age 45); Bedford, England
- Other name: GP
- Citizenship: United Kingdom; Italy
- Occupation: Race engineer
- Employer: Red Bull Racing
- Known for: Formula One engineer
- Title: Performance Engineer (2008–09); Race Engineer (2010–); Head of Race Engineering (2022–24); Head of Racing (2024–)
- Children: 1

Gianpiero "GP" Lambiase (born 14 October 1980) is a British and Italian engineer and motorsport executive. Since 2025, Lambiase has served as head of racing for Red Bull in Formula One; he also serves as race engineer for Max Verstappen, guiding him to four consecutive World Drivers' Championship titles from 2021 to 2024.

== Career ==
Gianpiero Lambiase was born on 14 October 1980 in Bedford, England, to Italian parents. Having graduated from University College London with a degree in Mechanical Engineering, Lambiase started his Formula One career in 2005 with Jordan and worked with the Silverstone outfit through its numerous guises for 11 years, even after the team was transformed into Midland, Spyker and Force India. In 2008 he worked as a performance engineer for Giancarlo Fisichella, guiding the Italian to Force India's first pole position and podium in Belgium 2009. In 2010, he became a race engineer for Vitantonio Liuzzi and when the Italian left at the end of that season, he took the same position for Paul di Resta. He worked with di Resta for three years, who was replaced by Sergio Pérez in 2014. After working with Pérez for one season, Lambiase moved to Red Bull Racing.

At Red Bull Racing, he joined Daniil Kvyat as a racing engineer in 2015 and maintained his position when Kvyat was replaced by Max Verstappen. In his role as race engineer, he is responsible for all trackside communications to the driver and the setup of the Formula One car. Lambiase is known for being extremely direct and precise in his communications on the radio, which Verstappen has frequently praised.

In 2022, Lambiase took over as Head of Race Engineering from Guillaume Rocquelin for Red Bull Racing, while also retaining his role as race engineer for Verstappen.

In October 2024, following the announced departure of former Sporting Director and Team Manager Jonathan Wheatley, who became Team Principal of Sauber, rebranded as Audi from 2026, Lambiase was promoted to Head of Racing, effective from the beginning of the 2025 season. In this capacity, he assumed responsibility for the race, heritage, and car build departments, and was tasked with coordinating strategic liaison and compliance with sporting regulations. The structural change resulted from Red Bull’s decision to divide the responsibilities previously held by Wheatley, instead of appointing a direct successor to the dual role of Sporting Director and Team Manager. Lambiase continued to serve as race engineer to Max Verstappen. Following his promotion, Lambiase became the third-ranking figure within Red Bull’s technical and sporting hierarchy, reporting directly to Technical Director Pierre Waché and Team Principal Laurent Mekies, with Acting Head of Sporting Steve Knowles and Head of Race Team Operations Richard Wolverson both reporting to him.

During the 2025 Austrian Grand Prix weekend, Lambiase missed his first F1 race weekend with Verstappen due to personal reasons. In his absence, Simon Rennie, who is currently the Group Leader of Simulation Engineering stepped in as Verstappen's race engineer for the weekend. Rennie also took on Lambiase's responsibilities as Head of Racing for the weekend in Lambiase's absence.

During the 2025 Belgian Grand Prix weekend, Lambiase missed his second F1 race weekend with Verstappen, again due to personal reasons. Similar to Austria, Rennie stepped in as Verstappen's race engineer for the weekend. Rennie also took over Lambiase's responsibilities as Head of Racing for the weekend in Lambiase's absence.

On 9 April 2026, it was announced Lambiase will leave Red Bull following the expiry of his contract with the team at the end of 2027 to join McLaren no later than 2028 as Chief Racing Officer, reporting directly to Team Principal Andrea Stella. He will remain as Verstappen's Race Engineer until the end of 2026, with Tom Hart set to takeover full time from 2027 and at the 2026 Austin, São Paulo (Brazil), and Las Vegas Grands Prix as part of the transition. In addition, Red Bull announced the signing of former Aston Martin Performance Director, Tom McCullough as Lambiase's successor of "Head of Racing" from 2027.
