= Guillaume Rocquelin =

French engineer (born 1974)

Guillaume Roquelin
- Born: 14 August 1974 (age 52); Dijon, France
- Other name: "Rocky"
- Occupation: Engineer
- Years active: 1996-
- Employer: Red Bull Racing
- Known for: Formula One engineer
- Title: Race Engineer (2000-2014); Head of Race Engineering (2015-2022); Head of Driver Academy (2022-present)

Guillaume "Rocky" Rocquelin (born 14 August 1974) is a French Formula One engineer. He is currently the Head of Driver Academy at the Red Bull Racing Formula One team, and was formerly the Head of Race Engineering from 2015 to 2022. He is the former race engineer of four-time world champion Sebastian Vettel.

== Career ==
Rocquelin, or “Rocky” as he is generally referred to at Red Bull, studied engineering at the Grenoble Institute of Technology. He began his motorsport career in the United States, working as a trackside engineer in CART / IndyCar racing for PacWest with Mark Blundell and then later at Newman-Haas.

Rocquelin then moved to Red Bull Racing in Formula One in 2006, starting as David Coulthard's race engineer, where he worked until 2008. From 2009 to 2014, he served as Sebastian Vettel's race engineer being instrumental in his four consecutive world championships from 2010 to 2013. In 2015, he was promoted to Head of Race Engineering.

Rocquelin's role of Head of Race Engineering from 2015 to 2022 consisted of extracting the maximum performance out of both cars on any given weekend. He worked very closely with the engineering teams on both sides of the Red Bull garage and the performance groups back in the factory to ensure that both cars benefit from the best available information at a race weekend.

The 2022 Australian Grand Prix was Rocquelin's last race trackside as he took on a role in helping the development of drivers in the Red Bull Junior Team starting in April 2022. He was replaced by Gianpiero Lambiase who is also Max Verstappen's race engineer.

The 2022 Abu Dhabi Grand Prix saw Rocquelin temporarily return to trackside operations for FP1 as Red Bull Junior Liam Lawson took the seat of Max Verstappen for the session.

The following year's 2023 Abu Dhabi Grand Prix saw Rocquelin return to trackside operations temporarily for FP1 as Jake Dennis and Isack Hadjar took the seats of Max Verstappen and Sergio Pérez respectively.
