= Hugh Bird =

British engineer

- Occupation: Race engineer
- Employer: Red Bull Racing
- Known for: Formula One engineer
- Title: Head of Vehicle Suspension and Trackside Support

Hugh Bird is a British Formula One engineer. He is currently the Head of Vehicle Suspension and Trackside Support and was the race engineer for Sergio Pérez at Red Bull Racing.

== Career ==
After graduating from Cambridge University, Bird started his career in motorsport in 2012 as a simulation and analysis engineer for Red Bull Racing. He then became a simulation performance engineer from 2015 to 2017. For the 2018 Formula One World Championship he was appointed as Max Verstappen's performance engineer in a spell where the Dutchman scored seven victories and several podium finishes. He was appointed as Sergio Pérez's senior race engineer for the 2021 Formula One World Championship, coaching the Mexican to one victory and fourth place in the Drivers' Championship. He continued to be Pérez's race engineer in 2022, guiding Perez to victory at the 2022 Singapore Grand Prix and where Pérez finished in third in the Drivers' Championship. In 2023, he guided Perez to finish in second in the Drivers' Championship, along with victories at Azerbaijan and Saudi Arabia along with podiums in Bahrain, Miami, Austria, Austria, Hungary, Belgium, Italy and Las Vegas. He would remain in the role until the 2024 Dutch Grand Prix where he went on a paternity leave. He was subsequently replaced by Richard Wood temporarily until the United States Grand Prix where he returned as Perez's Race Engineer where he served until the end of the year when Sergio Perez was released from Red Bull. Following Perez's departure, Bird was moved back to the Milton Keynes Factory to the role of "Suspension Group Team Leader".
