= Elliot Dason-Barber =

British engineer (born 1969)

- Born: Elliot Guy Dason-Barber; December 7, 1969 (age 56)
- Education: University of Huddersfield
- Occupation: Engineer
- Employer: Ansible Motion
- Known for: Motorsports Engineer
- Title: Technical director

Elliot Guy Dason-Barber (born 7 December 1969) is a British Formula One and motorsports engineer. He is currently the Technical Director for simulation company Ansible Motion, and has previously served in senior engineering positions at Sauber Motorsport, Caterham F1, Lotus Racing and Red Bull Racing.

== Career ==
Dason-Barber studied mechanical engineering at the University of Huddersfield, graduating in 1993. He began his career at Jaguar Land Rover in 1991 as a sponsored undergraduate and later a vehicle dynamics engineer. Dason-Barber then moved to Ricardo as Head of Vehicle Dynamics, where he provided consulting to the motorsport industry in North America.

In later 2004, Dason-Barber joined the newly established Red Bull Racing as Vehicle Dynamics Group Leader. He was responsible for developing the team's vehicle dynamics capability and contributed to the design and performance development of the Red Bull RB1 through Red Bull RB5 chassis. His work included suspension definition, ride and handling targets, and the creation of both trackside and factory simulation tools, including early driver-in-the-loop simulator systems.

Seeking a new challenge, Dason-Barber joined the newly formed Lotus Racing Formula One programme in 2010 as Head of Vehicle Dynamics, tasked with establishing the department from a clean-sheet structure. He subsequently coupled this role with that of Head of Research and Development, overseeing simulation, rig testing, tyre modelling, and chassis performance studies as the team evolved into Caterham F1.

In 2014, he moved to Sauber Motorsport as Head of Vehicle Performance, being responsible for trackside engineering, aerodynamics, tyres, simulation and vehicle dynamics. He was jointly responsible for the Sauber C34 alongside Eric Gandelin and Willem Toet. He was later promoted to Head of Performance Engineering, leading the teams entire performance engineering programme for the Sauber C35.

Dason-Barber left Sauber and joined JRM Advance Engineering in 2016, initially as Chief Engineer and later Technical Director. He oversaw engineering delivery across motorsport and advanced automotive projects, including Jaguar Land Rover and Aston Martin as well as Arctic Trucks, Subaru and Nismo. In 2025, Dason-Barber was appointed Technical Director at Ansible Motion, where he leads engineering strategy and development of driver-in-the-loop simulation systems used by motorsport teams and automotive manufacturers worldwide.
