= Sauber C35 =

Sauber Formula One car

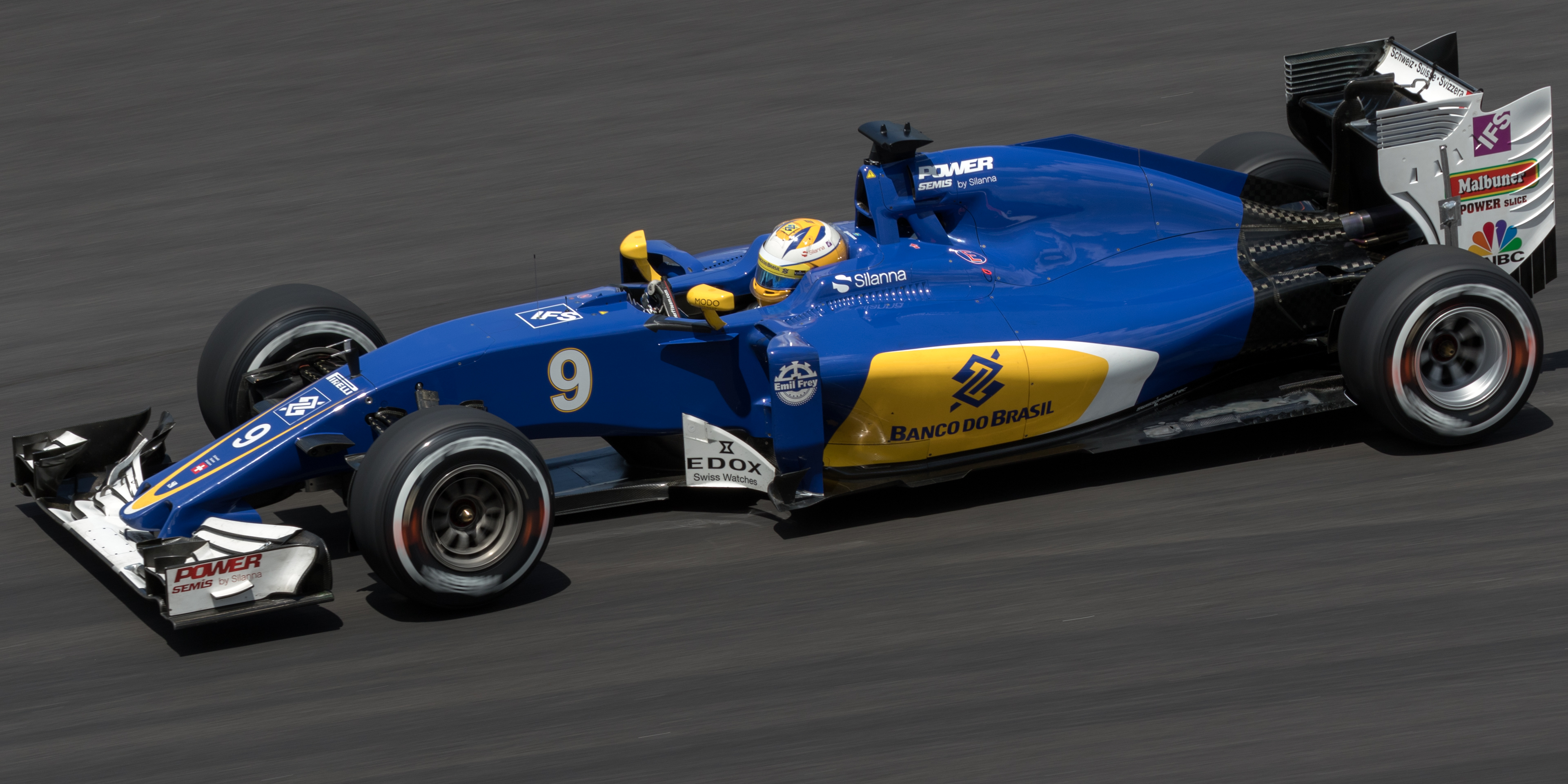
- The Sauber C35, driven by Marcus Ericsson, during the Malaysian Grand Prix
- Category: Formula One
- Constructor: Sauber
- Designers: Mark Smith (Technical Director); Eric Gandelin (Chief Designer); Elliot Dason-Barber (Head of Vehicle Engineering); Vin Dhanani (Head of Vehicle Performance); Seamus Mullarkey (Head of Aerodynamic Research); Mariano Alperin (Head of Aerodynamic Development)
- Predecessor: Sauber C34
- Successor: Sauber C36

Technical specifications
- Chassis: Carbon-fibre composite survival cell
- Engine: Ferrari 061 1.6 L (98 cu in) direct injection V6 turbocharged engine, limited to 15,000 rpm in a mid-mounted, rear-wheel drive layout
- Electric motor: Kinetic and thermal energy recovery systems
- Transmission: Sequential shift gearbox with eight forward and one reverse gears
- Battery: Lithium-ion batteries
- Brakes: Carbon discs with steel calipers
- Tyres: Pirelli P Zero (dry) tyres Pirelli Cinturato (wet) tyres

Competition history
- Notable entrants: Sauber F1 Team
- Notable drivers: 9. (Sweden) Marcus Ericsson; 12. (Brazil) Felipe Nasr
- Debut: 2016 Australian Grand Prix
- Last event: 2016 Abu Dhabi Grand Prix
Races	Wins	Podiums	Poles	F/Laps
21	0	0	0	0

The Sauber C35 is a Formula One racing car designed by Sauber to compete in the 2016 Formula One season. The car was driven by Marcus Ericsson and Felipe Nasr, and used the Ferrari 061 power unit.

The chassis was designed by Mark Smith, Eric Gandelin, Elliot Dason-Barber and Seamus Mullarkey with the car being powered with a customer Ferrari powertrain.

== Competitiveness ==
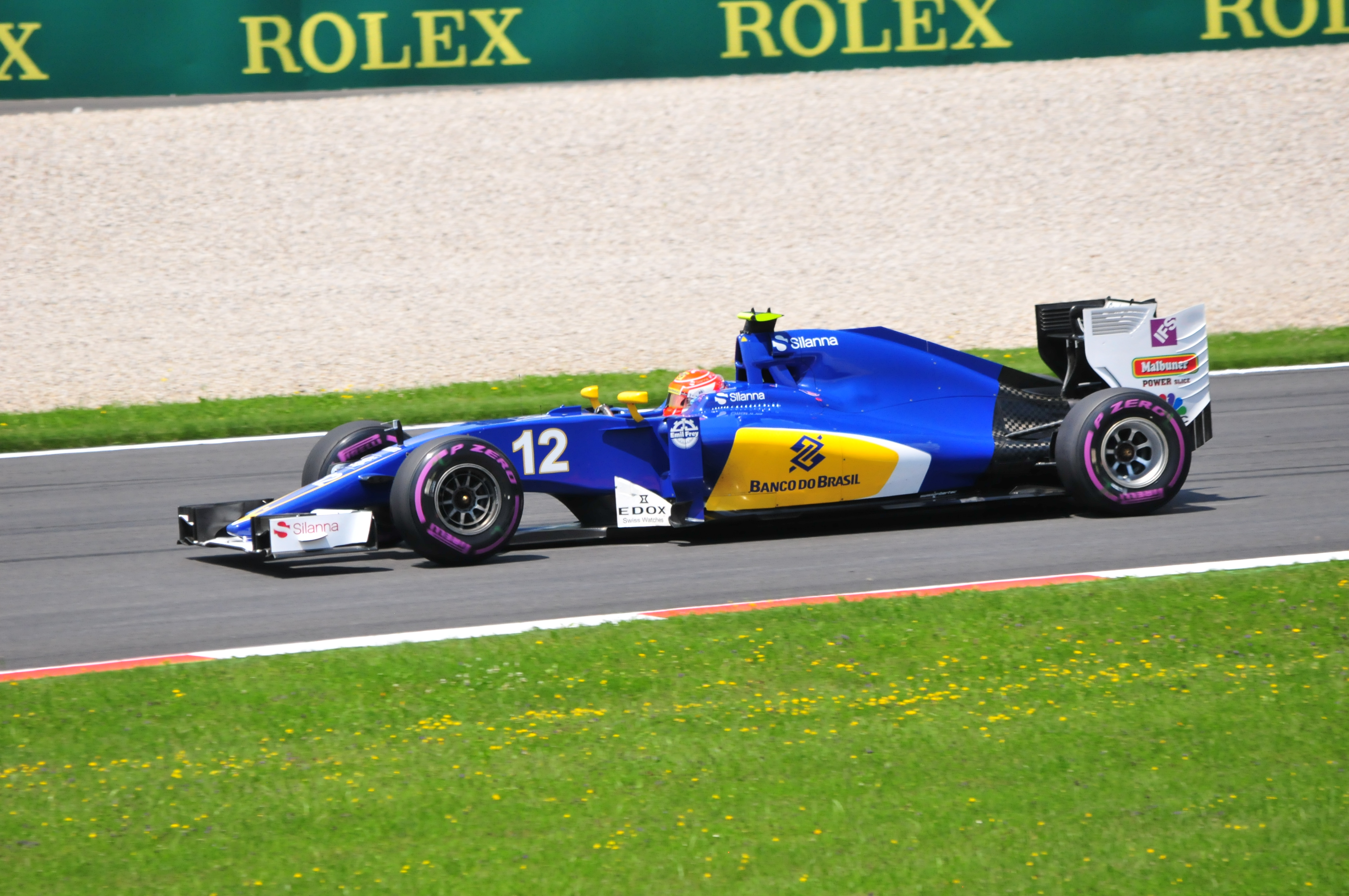
Felipe Nasr driving the C35 at the Austrian Grand Prix

During the first half of the season, the car proved to be less competitive compared to its predecessor due to less development over winter, caused by financial problems of the team.

The team scored its only points of the season during the dramatic Brazilian Grand Prix in very wet conditions. The team also overtook their nearest rivals, Manor, in the constructors' championship when Felipe Nasr crossed the line in 9th, which was enough to give them 10th place in the constructors' championship.

== Livery ==
The livery remained unchanged with a few additional sponsors including CNBC. This was the second and final year for Banco do Brasil sponsorship, prior to Nasr leaving the team.

== Complete Formula One results ==
(key) (results in bold indicate pole position; results in italics indicate fastest lap)

Year	Entrant	Engine	Tyres	Drivers	Grands Prix																					Points	WCC
Year	Entrant	Engine	Tyres	Drivers	AUS	BHR	CHN	RUS	ESP	MON	CAN	EUR	AUT	GBR	HUN	GER	BEL	ITA	SIN	MAL	JPN	USA	MEX	BRA	ABU	Points	WCC
2016	Sauber F1 Team	Ferrari 061	**P**																								
2016	Sauber F1 Team	Ferrari 061	**P**	(Sweden) Marcus Ericsson	Ret	12	16	14	12	Ret	15	17	15	Ret	20	18	Ret	16	17	12	15	14	11	Ret	15	**2**	**10th**
2016	Sauber F1 Team	Ferrari 061	**P**	(Brazil) Felipe Nasr	15	14	20	16	14	Ret	18	12	13	15	17	Ret	17	Ret	13	Ret	19	15	15	9	16	**2**	**10th**
