= Sauber C34 =

2015 Formula One racing car

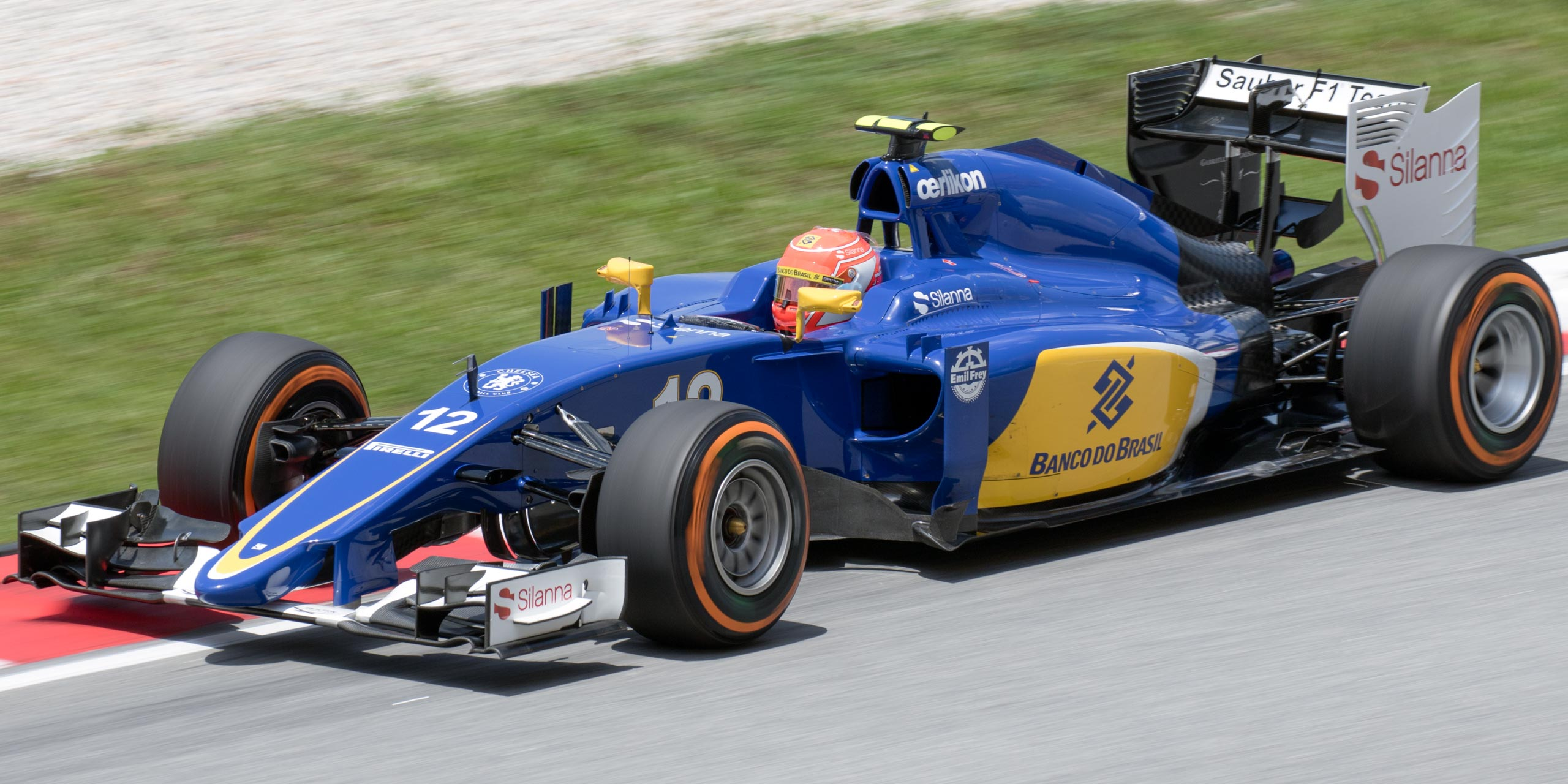
- Felipe Nasr driving the C34 during the Malaysian Grand Prix
- Category: Formula One
- Constructor: Sauber
- Designers: Eric Gandelin (Chief Designer); Elliot Dason-Barber (Head of Vehicle Performance); Vin Dhanani (Head of Vehicle Dynamics); Willem Toet (Head of Aerodynamics); Seamus Mullarkey (Head of Aerodynamic Research); Mariano Alperin (Head of Aerodynamic Development)
- Predecessor: Sauber C33
- Successor: Sauber C35

Technical specifications
- Chassis: Carbon-fibre monocoque
- Suspension (front): Upper and lower wishbones, inboard springs and dampers activated by pushrods
- Suspension (rear): Upper and lower wishbones, inboard springs and dampers activated by pullrods
- Engine: Ferrari 060 1.6 L (1,600 cc; 98 cu in) V6, turbocharged, 90°, 15,000 RPM limited
- Transmission: Ferrari Semi-automatic 8 Speed Forward with one reverse unit, longitudinally mounted, carbon-fibre clutch
- Weight: 702 kg (1,548 lb)
- Tyres: Pirelli P Zero (dry), Cinturato (wet)

Competition history
- Notable entrants: Sauber F1 Team
- Notable drivers: 9. (Sweden) Marcus Ericsson; 12. (Brazil) Felipe Nasr
- Debut: 2015 Australian Grand Prix
- Last event: 2015 Abu Dhabi Grand Prix
Races	Wins	Podiums	Poles	F/Laps
19	0	0	0	0

The Sauber C34 is a Formula One racing car which Sauber used to compete in the 2015 Formula One season. The C34 was driven by Marcus Ericsson and Felipe Nasr.

== History ==
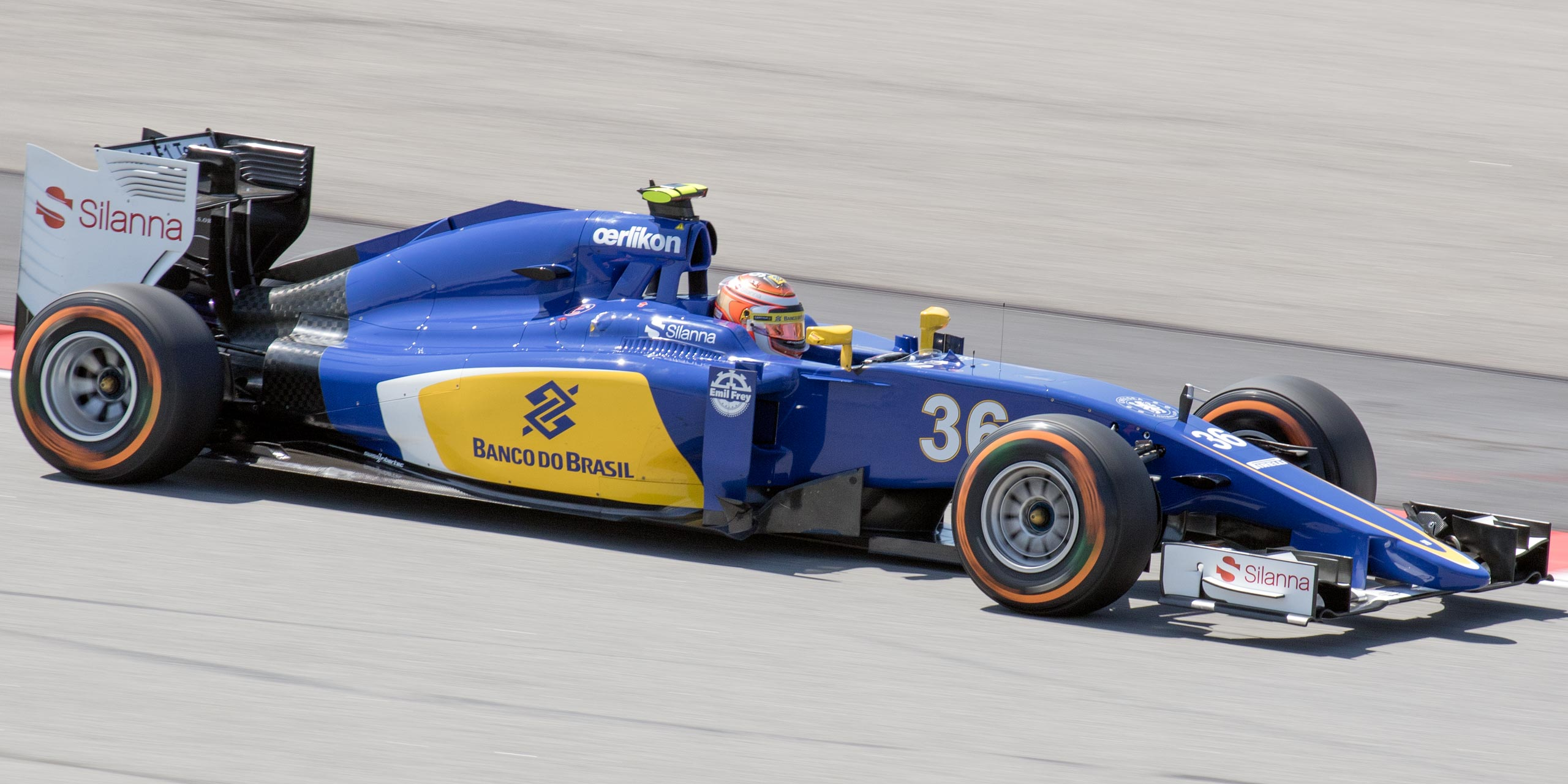
Reserve driver Raffaele Marciello driving the C34 during free practice for the Malaysian Grand Prix.

The car was launched online on 30 January 2015 on the team's website, and it proved to be a vast improvement over the C33. In the opening round of the season, in Australia, the Saubers qualified in eleventh and sixteenth places, with rookie Felipe Nasr ahead of his teammate Marcus Ericsson. They ended, respectively, in fifth and eighth positions. They would score again in the third round, in China, when Nasr finished in eighth place and Ericsson in tenth. Subsequently, the car's competitiveness seemed to decline, mostly due to the financial problems of the team. At the Singapore Grand Prix, Sauber introduced a new aerodynamic package.

Ericsson during the Italian Grand Prix, where he took ninth, serving as his last points finish in 2015.

The most immediate difference can be found in the shorter nose, quite similar in the shape with the ones of the Williams cars, Red Bulls and McLarens. The car also showed new front and rear wings and a slimmer bodywork; thanks to these upgrades – and the high rate of retirements – Nasr was able to finish in tenth position. In the last six races, Sauber managed to collect 10 points from a sixth and a ninth place – both results achieved by Nasr – ending the season with a tally of 36 points and 8th place in the World Constructors' Championship.

== Sponsorship and livery ==
The C34 featured a new blue and white livery along with a new Banco do Brasil sponsorship, resulting from Nasr joining the team. Both Claro and Telcel were dropped following Esteban Gutiérrez' departure from the team. This was the final year for the team being sponsored by Chelsea FC.

At the United States Grand Prix, the team celebrated its 400th race and the car featured the Sauber 400th GP logo, with the hashtag "JoinOurPassion".

== Complete Formula One results ==
(key) (results in bold indicate pole position; results in italics indicate fastest lap)

Year	Entrant	Engine	Tyres	Drivers	Grands Prix																			Points	WCC
Year	Entrant	Engine	Tyres	Drivers	AUS	MAL	CHN	BHR	ESP	MON	CAN	AUT	GBR	HUN	BEL	ITA	SIN	JPN	RUS	USA	MEX	BRA	ABU	Points	WCC
2015	Sauber F1 Team	Ferrari	**P**	(Sweden) Marcus Ericsson	8	Ret	10	14	14	13	14	13	11	10	10	9	11	14	Ret	Ret	12	16	14	36	8th
2015	Sauber F1 Team	Ferrari	**P**	(Brazil) Felipe Nasr	5	12	8	12	12	9	16	11	DNS	11	11	13	10	20^{†}	6	9	Ret	13	15	36	8th

^{†} Driver failed to finish the race, but was classified as they had completed greater than 90% of the race distance.
