= Sauber C36 =

Formula One car

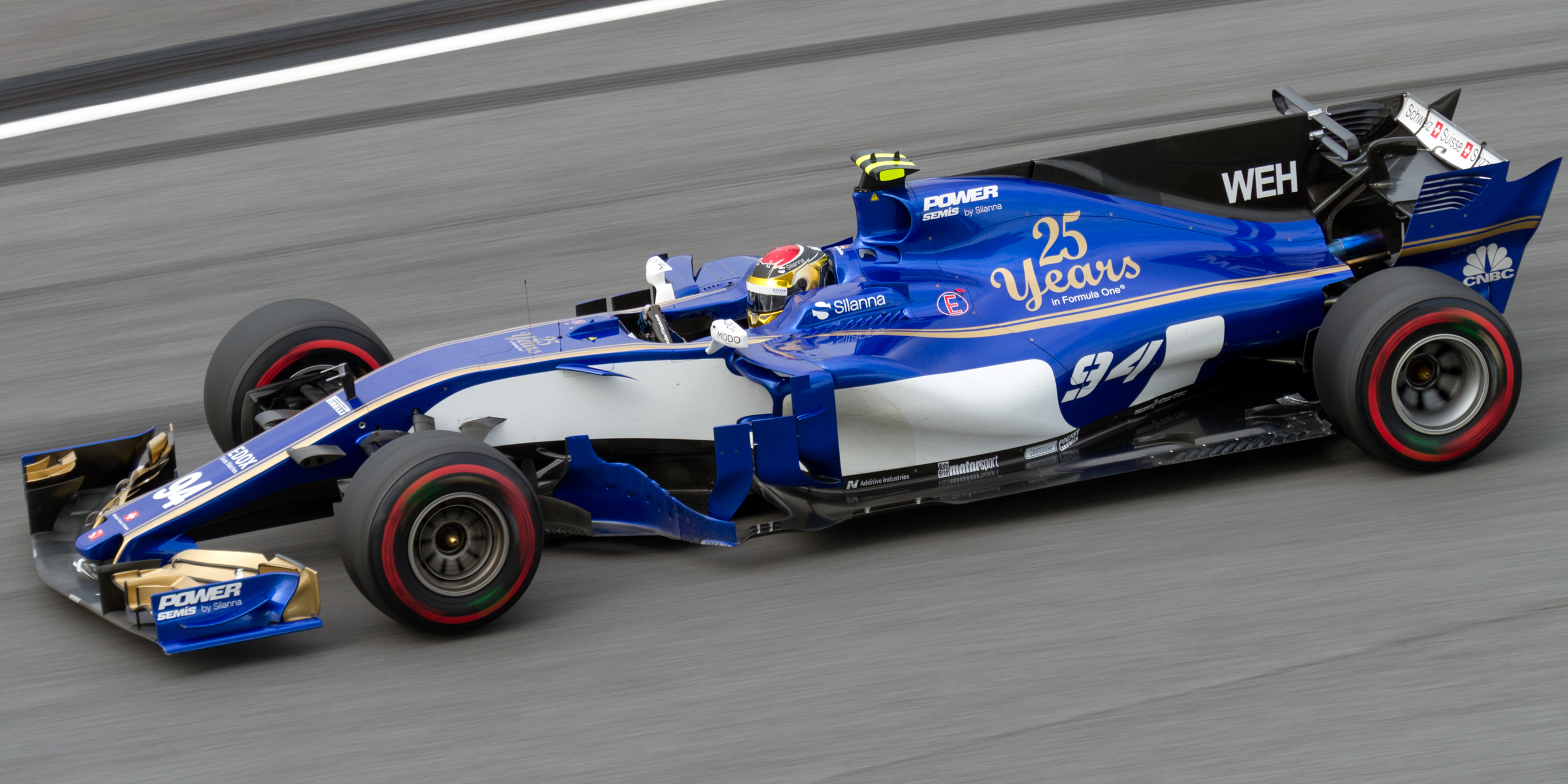
- Pascal Wehrlein driving the C36 at the Malaysian Grand Prix
- Category: Formula One
- Constructor: Sauber
- Designers: Jörg Zander (Technical Director); Eric Gandelin (Chief Designer); Vin Dhanani (Head of Vehicle Performance); Nicolas Hennel (Head of Aerodynamics); Mariano Alperin (Head of Aerodynamic Development)
- Predecessor: Sauber C35
- Successor: Sauber C37

Technical specifications
- Chassis: Carbon-fiber Monocoque
- Suspension (front): Upper and lower wishbone and pushrod activated torsion springs & rockers
- Suspension (rear): Upper and lower wishbone and pullrod activated torsion springs & rockers
- Engine: Ferrari 061 1,600 cc (97.6 cu in), Turbocharged, 90° - V6 engine, limited to 15,000 RPM in a longitudinal layout
- Electric motor: Motor Generator Unit–Kinetic and Motor Generator Unit–Heat
- Transmission: Ferrari 8-speed quick-shift carbon gearbox
- Weight: 728 kg (1,605.0 lb) (incl. driver)
- Brakes: Brembo Carbon brake discs, pads and calipers
- Tyres: Pirelli P Zero (Dry/Slick); Pirelli Cinturato (Wet/Treaded); OZ Racing Wheels: 13"

Competition history
- Notable entrants: Sauber F1 Team
- Notable drivers: 9. (Sweden) Marcus Ericsson; 36. (Italy) Antonio Giovinazzi; 94. (Germany) Pascal Wehrlein
- Debut: 2017 Australian Grand Prix
- Last event: 2017 Abu Dhabi Grand Prix
Races	Wins	Podiums	Poles	F/Laps
20	0	0	0	0

The Sauber C36 is a Formula One racing car designed and constructed by Sauber to compete in the 2017 Formula One World Championship. The car was driven by Marcus Ericsson and Pascal Wehrlein, who joined the team from Manor Racing to replace outgoing Felipe Nasr. Intended to be Sauber's last Ferrari powered car before joining Honda as a factory team, the C36 is one of the few cars of F1's turbo hybrid era to have been powered by a year-old power unit. This deal was eventually terminated by Sauber during the 2017 season when team principal Monisha Kaltenborn was replaced by new team owners Longbow Finance. Wehrlein achieved each of the car's five points, a score which relegated the team to a tenth place finish in the World Constructors Championship for a second consecutive season.

== Design and development ==
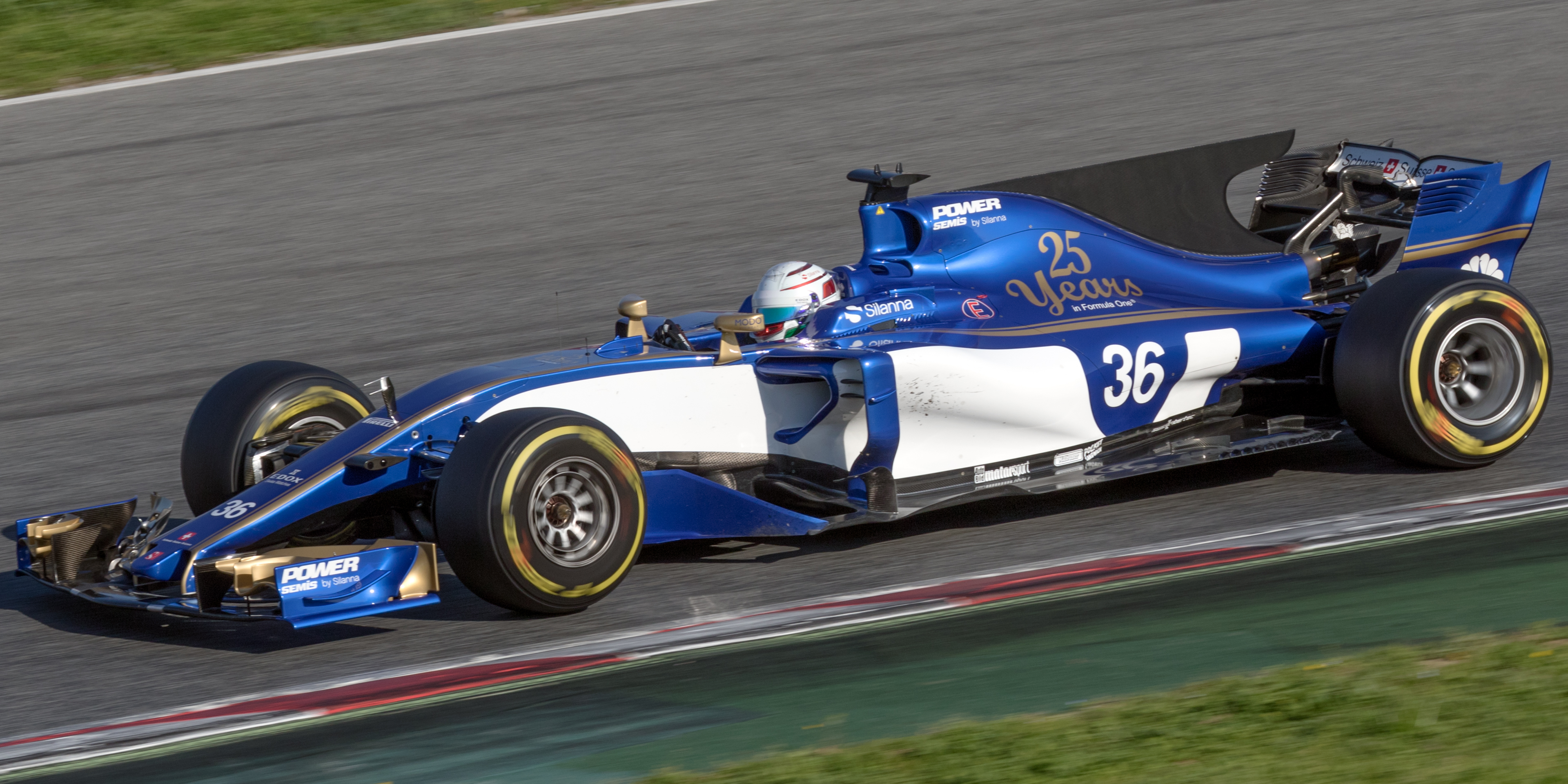
Reserve driver Antonio Giovinazzi testing the C36 during pre-season testing in March 2017.

Prior to the 2017 season, Sauber narrowly beat Manor to win the final prize money-winning position in the F1 World Constructors Championship. This lowly finishing position, combined with years of financial neglect, led to the team's takeover by Finn Rausing, a Swedish billionaire and owner of Longbow Finance. The C36's development was heavily impacted by the team's financial woes, leading Sauber to recycle the previous season's Ferrari 061 V6 power unit. Ferrari's comprehensive redesign of its V6 platform for 2017 changed the mounting points and shape of the new 062 engine, which the team was not prepared for and could not afford to accommodate in the C36. Team representatives argued that performance gains associated with the new Ferrari unit would be limited by 2017's new technical regulations.

The C36 was revealed one week before the first pre-season test at Circuit de Barcelona-Catalunya and featured a blue, white, and gold livery that celebrated the team's 25th anniversary of competition in F1. The C36 completed a respectable 788 laps across both pre-season test sessions, but set a fastest lap time that was slowest of all teams by three tenths. Both race drivers participated in the test in addition to reserve driver Antonio Giovinazzi.

== Competition history ==
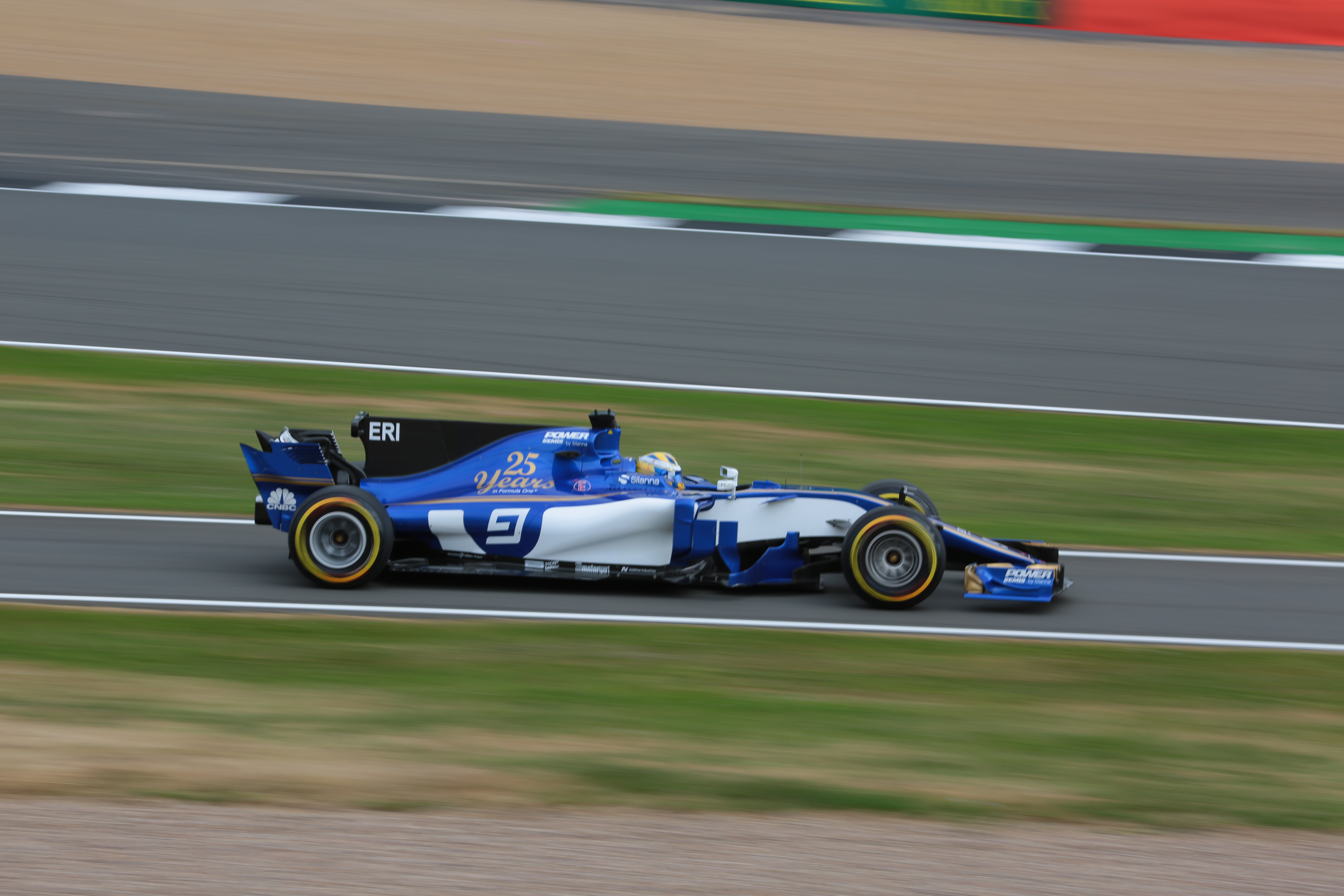
Ericsson took 14th at the British Grand Prix.

The season started difficultly for the team after new lead driver Wehrlein suffered a major crash at the 2017 Race of Champions that sidelined him from the first two rounds. The team drafted reserve driver Giovinazzi to take his place, who finished in a respectable twelfth place on his Formula 1 debut. However, at round two in Shanghai, Giovinazzi crashed heavily twice at the final corner, causing major damage to the chassis and eventually retiring from the race.

Three races after returning from injury, Wehrlein delivered the car's first points finish at round five in Spain. His seventh place result was later corrected to an eighth place finish after incurring a five second time penalty for a pit lane entry infringement.

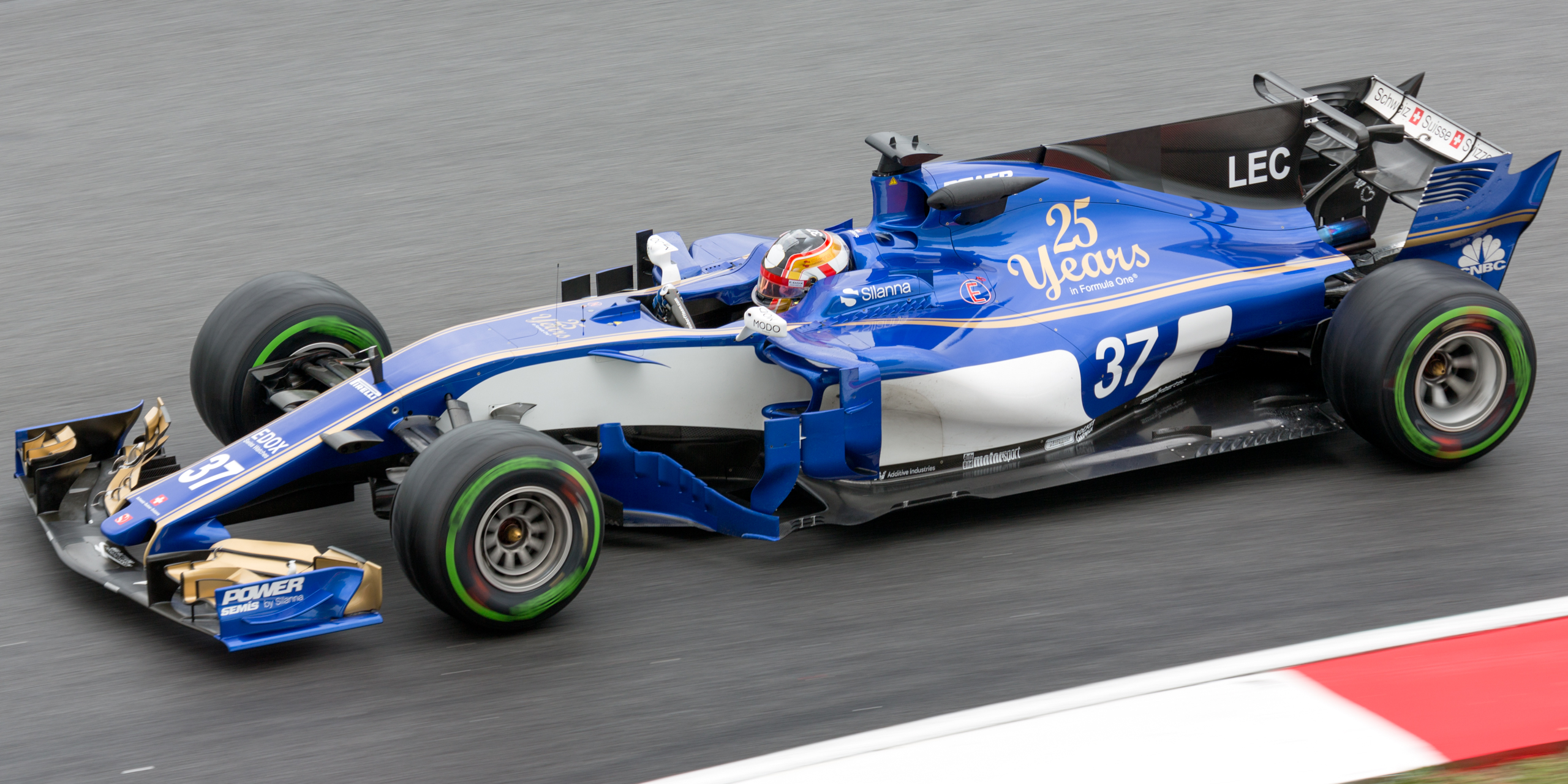
Sauber fielded Ferrari Academy driver Charles Leclerc during the FP1 at the Malaysian Grand Prix. The Monegasque driver would make him full-time debut for the team in the following year.

Three rounds later at the Azerbaijan Grand Prix, in the same weekend of team principal Kaltenborn's departure, Wehrlein finished in tenth position to secure another points finish for the team. He led teammate Marcus Ericsson to the flag, who finished in eleventh place to achieve what would be his best result for the remainder of the season.

The C36 was not a points contender for the rest of the season, achieving notability only for a strange crash between Wehrlein and Jenson Button at Portier corner at the Monaco Grand Prix. A late move by Button on corner entry clipped Wehrlein's right rear tyre, flipping the C36 onto its left side tyres. This revealed the car's underside and floor plank to spectators and the global television feed, pinching Wehrlein against the seawall until track marshals arrived to extricate him. Later in the season at the Malaysian Grand Prix, the C36 fielded Ferrari Academy driver Charles Leclerc in Free Practice 1.

== Complete Formula One results ==
(key) (results in bold indicate pole position; results in italics indicate fastest lap)

Year	Entrant	Engine	Tyres	Drivers	Grands Prix																				Points	WCC
Year	Entrant	Engine	Tyres	Drivers	AUS	CHN	BHR	RUS	ESP	MON	CAN	AZE	AUT	GBR	HUN	BEL	ITA	SIN	MAL	JPN	USA	MEX	BRA	ABU	Points	WCC
2017	Sauber F1 Team	Ferrari 061	**P**																							
2017	Sauber F1 Team	Ferrari 061	**P**	(Sweden) Marcus Ericsson	Ret	15	Ret	15	11	Ret	13	11	15	14	16	16	18†	Ret	18	Ret	15	Ret	13	17	5	10th
2017	Sauber F1 Team	Ferrari 061	**P**	(Italy) Antonio Giovinazzi	12	Ret																			5	10th
2017	Sauber F1 Team	Ferrari 061	**P**	(Germany) Pascal Wehrlein	WD		11	16	8	Ret	15	10	14	17	15	Ret	16	12	17	15	Ret	14	14	14	5	10th

Notes

- † – Driver failed to finish the race, but was classified as they had completed greater than 90% of the race distance.
