= Marcus Ericsson =

Swedish racing driver (born 1990)

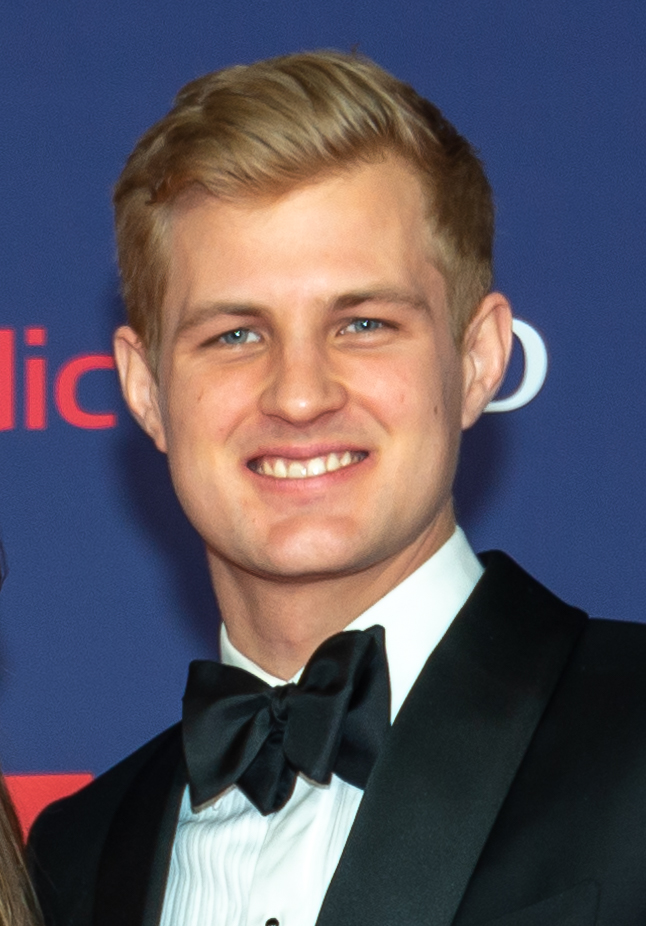
- Ericsson in 2023
- Born: Marcus Thorbjörn Ericsson; 2 September 1990 (age 36); Kumla, Sweden
- Relatives: Hampus Ericsson (brother)
- Categorisation: FIA Platinum

IndyCar Series career
- 127 races run over 8 years
- Team: No. 28 (Andretti Global)
- Best finish: 6th (2021, 2022, 2023)
- First race: 2019 Grand Prix of St. Petersburg (St. Petersburg)
- Last race: 2026 Mission Grand Prix of Monterey (Laguna Seca)
- First win: 2021 Detroit Grand Prix, Race 1 (Belle Isle)
- Last win: 2026 Ontario Honda Dealers Indy Markham (Markham)
Wins	Podiums	Poles
5	13	1

Formula One World Championship career
- Nationality: (Sweden) Swedish
- Active years: 2014–2018
- Team(s): Caterham, Sauber
- Car number: 9
- Entries: 97
- Championships: 0
- Wins: 0
- Podiums: 0
- Career points: 18
- Pole positions: 0
- Fastest laps: 0
- First entry: 2014 Australian Grand Prix
- Last entry: 2018 Abu Dhabi Grand Prix

Previous series
- 2010–2013; 2009–2011; 2009; 2008–2009; 2007: GP2 Series; GP2 Asia Series; Japanese F3; British F3; Formula BMW UK

Championship titles
- 2022; 2009; 2007: Indianapolis 500; Japanese F3; Formula BMW UK

Awards
- 2007, 2009: Swedish Junior Racer of the Year
- Website: marcusericsson.com

Marcus Thorbjörn Ericsson (born 2 September 1990) is a Swedish racing driver, who competes in the IndyCar Series driving the No. 28 Dallara-Honda for Andretti Global. Ericsson competed in Formula One from 2014 to 2018. In American open-wheel racing, Ericsson won the Indianapolis 500 in 2022 with Chip Ganassi Racing.

Born and raised in Kumla, Ericsson began competitive kart racing aged nine, winning several national titles. After a successful debut in car racing in 2007 which saw him take the British Formula BMW title with Fortec Motorsport, he moved up into the British team's British Formula Three Championship squad. After finishing as one of the top rookies in the category, Ericsson turned his attentions to the All-Japan Formula Three Championship where he won the championship in his debut year. In 2010, he moved up to the GP2 Series where he secured one victory during his maiden campaign for Super Nova Racing. Between 2011 and 2012, Ericsson drove for iSport. Ericsson completed the 2013 GP2 season with DAMS, and debuted in Formula One in 2014 with Caterham F1.

== Early career ==
=== Karting ===
Marcus Thorbjörn Ericsson was born on 2 September 1990 in Kumla, Örebro County, Sweden. Ericsson's first taste of motorsport came when he was nine years old racing in karts. "I got a call from Fredrik Ekblom, whom I ran in British Formula 3000 and Indy Lights. He now runs a kart circuit and he told me about a nine-year-old kid who'd walked in off the street and nearly broke the lap record", recalled Richard Dutton, head of Fortec Motorsport. Ekblom managed to convince Ericsson's father, Tomas, to buy his son a kart and the young Swede stayed in karting for the next four years, "I'd never really thought about racing as a career. My family didn't have the money for me to race formula cars so we never thought about it", Ericsson said.

In 2006, Ericsson's career got backing from former Champ Car driver and 1999 Indianapolis 500 winner Kenny Bräck, who said:

I spotted Marcus at a race in Gothenburg. He didn't win the race because his engine blew up with two laps to go but he was clearly the best out there. He didn't get caught in any battles when passing – he'd just wait for the right opportunity, then he pounced and he was away. He has such patience but when he does go for it, it measures so perfectly. He reminded me of watching Alain Prost.

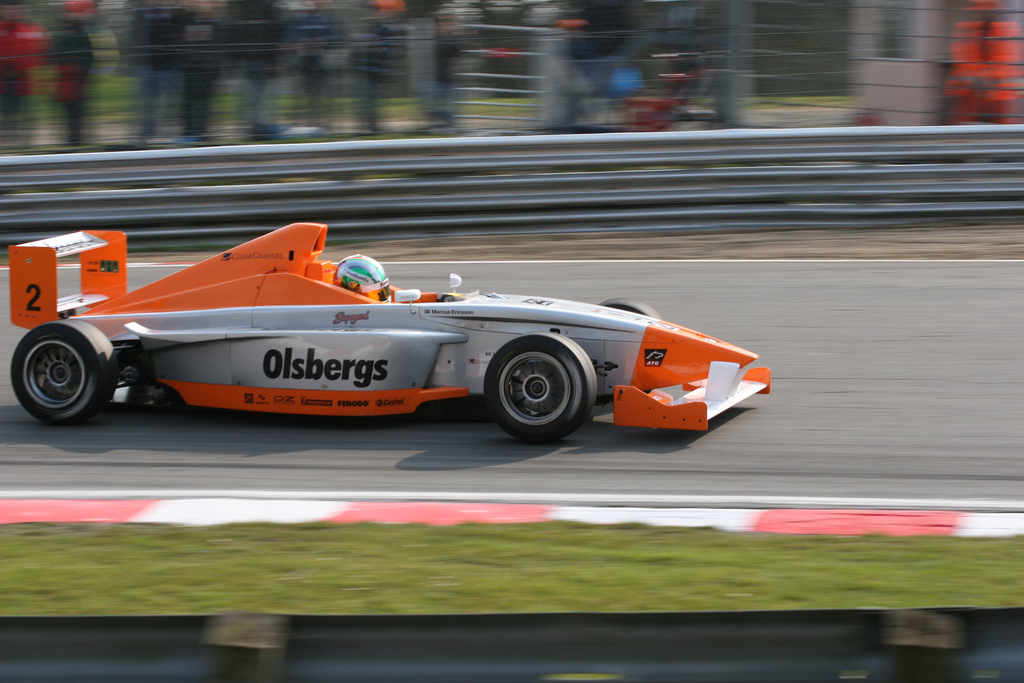
Ericsson won his second Formula BMW race at Brands Hatch by six seconds.

=== Formula BMW ===
Bräck convinced Richard Dutton, who ran Bräck in the British Formula Three Championship in 1989, to race Ericsson for his Fortec Motorsport team's 2007 Formula BMW UK title challenge. Ericsson said of his chances during the season, "I was thinking that I should be around top eight to start with, trying for podiums and maybe wins by the end of the year". Ericsson's first win came at the first meeting of the series at Brands Hatch where he took third place in the first race and won from pole position in the second race. Following his win, Ericsson was described by Autosport as "the best young talent" Bräck had ever seen. Ericsson was in the title race for the whole season, challenging Czech Josef Král and Brit Henry Arundel. In the end, Ericsson, aged 16, won the title by 40 points from Kral, becoming the final Champion of the British Formula BMW series before the series merged with the German series to make a European championship.

=== Formula Three ===
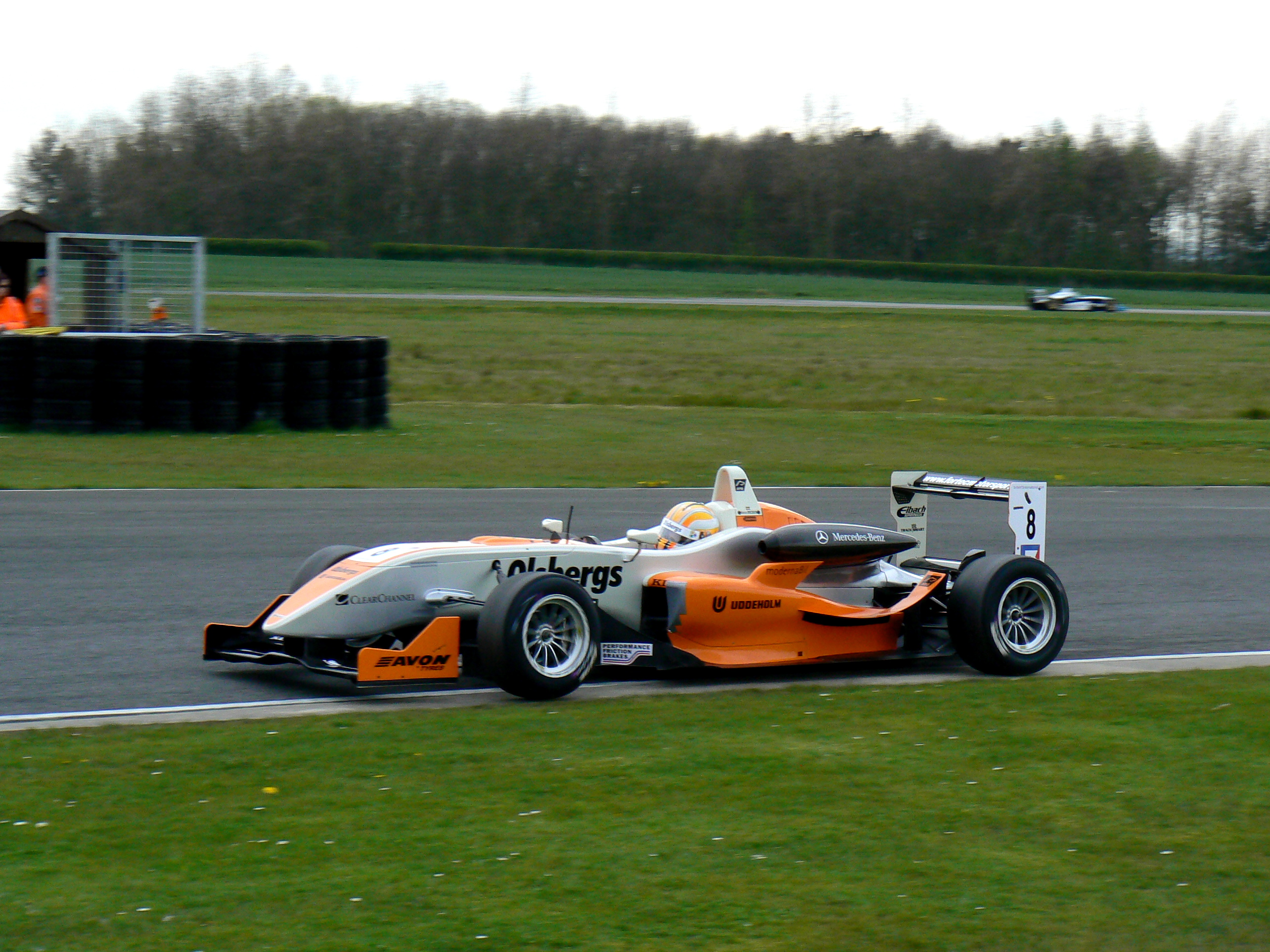
Ericsson driving for Fortec Motorsport at the Croft round of the 2008 British Formula Three Championship

Following his win of the Formula BMW title, Ericsson began aiming for a seat in Formula Three. Tests followed with the British Formula 3 team Räikkönen Robertson Racing as part of his prize for winning the title that year. Afterward Ericsson had a test with frontrunning Formula 3 Euro Series team ASM, later ART Grand Prix. Despite an offer to join ASM, Ericsson opted to stay in England and join Fortec's British Formula 3 team. Ericsson received with two pole positions and a handful of podium finishes, but no victories, which gave him fifth overall in the championship.

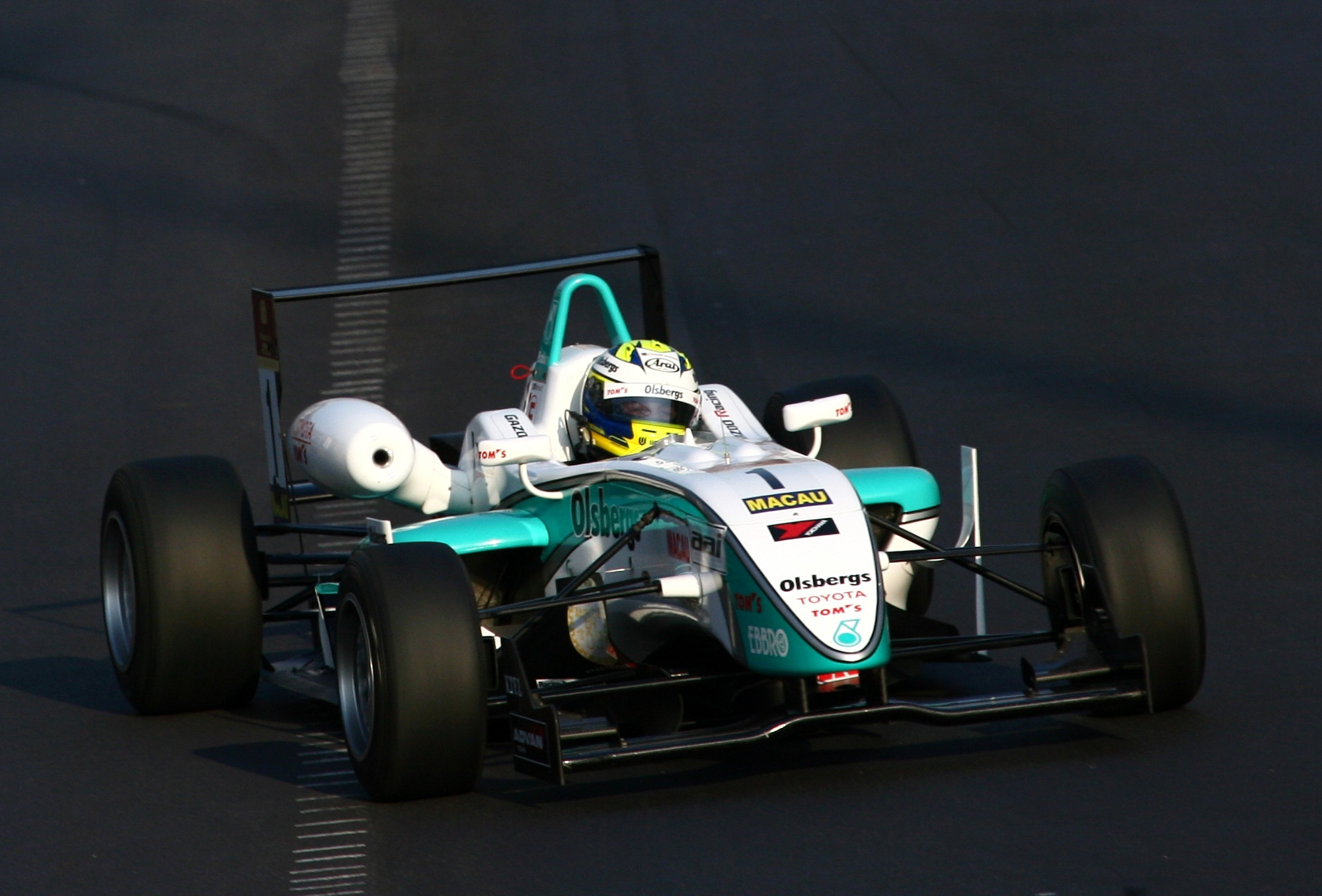
Ericsson driving for TOM'S at the 2009 Macau Grand Prix, where he finished fourth

During the winter of 2008, Ericsson signed a contract with the Japanese F3 team TOM'S to compete full-time in the championship for the upcoming 2009 season. Ericsson said that he was more likely to gain the experience needed to win the Macau Grand Prix in comparison to competing further in the British championship. Ericsson won the Japanese F3 championship and also won races when making guest appearances back in British F3. He consequently participated in the Macau Grand Prix where he qualified in pole position and finished the main race in the fourth position.

=== GP2 Series ===
Ericsson moved into the GP2 Asia Series for the 2009–10 GP2 Asia Series, driving originally for the ART Grand Prix team. However, it was later confirmed that Ericsson would drive for Super Nova Racing in the 2010 GP2 Series, although he was replaced with Jake Rosenzweig for the final two rounds. Ericsson returned to Super Nova for the GP2 Series, partnering Josef Král and later Luca Filippi. He took his first series victory at Valencia, but only scoring points on two further occasions restricted him to seventeenth place in the drivers' championship.

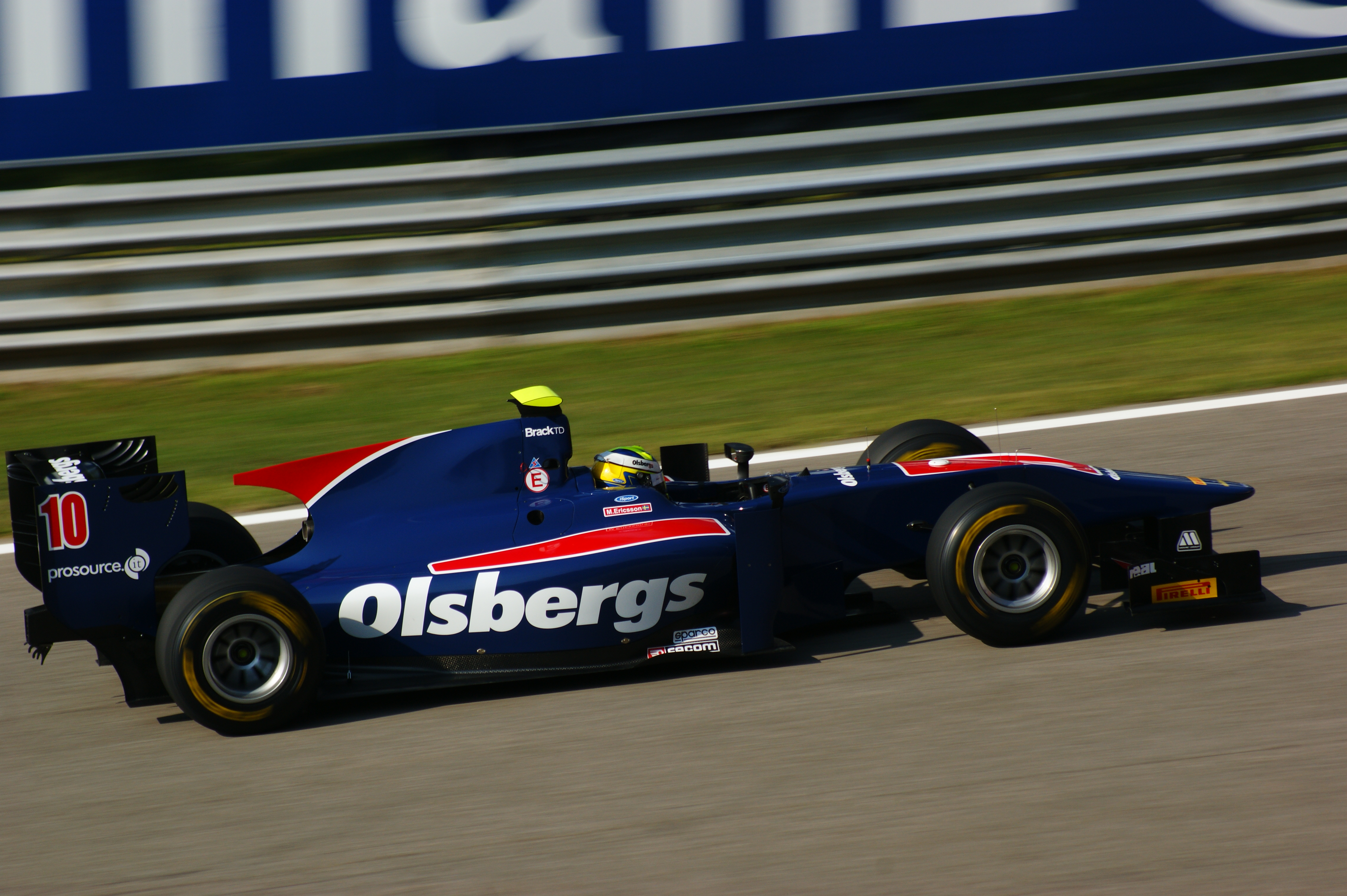
Ericsson driving for iSport at the Monza round of the 2011 GP2 Series

Ericsson switched to the iSport International team for 2011, alongside Sam Bird. He finished sixth in the Asia series championship, and tenth in the main series championship. He remained with iSport for 2012, alongside Jolyon Palmer. He won at Spa, beginning a run of six consecutive points finishes to the end of the season, including two podium finishes. This lifted him to eighth in the championship.

In 2013, Ericsson competed for the reigning champions DAMS, taking pole positions in Spain and Great Britain. In Germany, he won the feature race, and he continued with podium positions in Hungary, Belgium, Singapore, and Abu Dhabi to finish sixth in the championship.

== Formula One ==
Ericsson drove for Brawn GP at the young driver test at Circuito de Jerez over three days, on 1–3 December 2009. He tested alongside IndyCar Series driver Mike Conway. Conway had the edge by three-tenths of a second, however team principal Ross Brawn commended Ericsson for his performance, saying that he had "performed very well showing exceptional maturity in his approach and feedback".

Ericsson has described his five seasons in Formula One, which encompasses 97 Grand Prix starts, as mentally challenging, in contrast to his later success in IndyCar.

=== Caterham (2014) ===
On 21 November 2013, It was announced that Ericsson was a candidate to drive for the Caterham F1 Team in 2014 with Kamui Kobayashi as teammate. On 21 January 2014, the team announced that Ericsson and Kobayashi would be their race driver line up for the forthcoming season, with Robin Frijns as reserve.

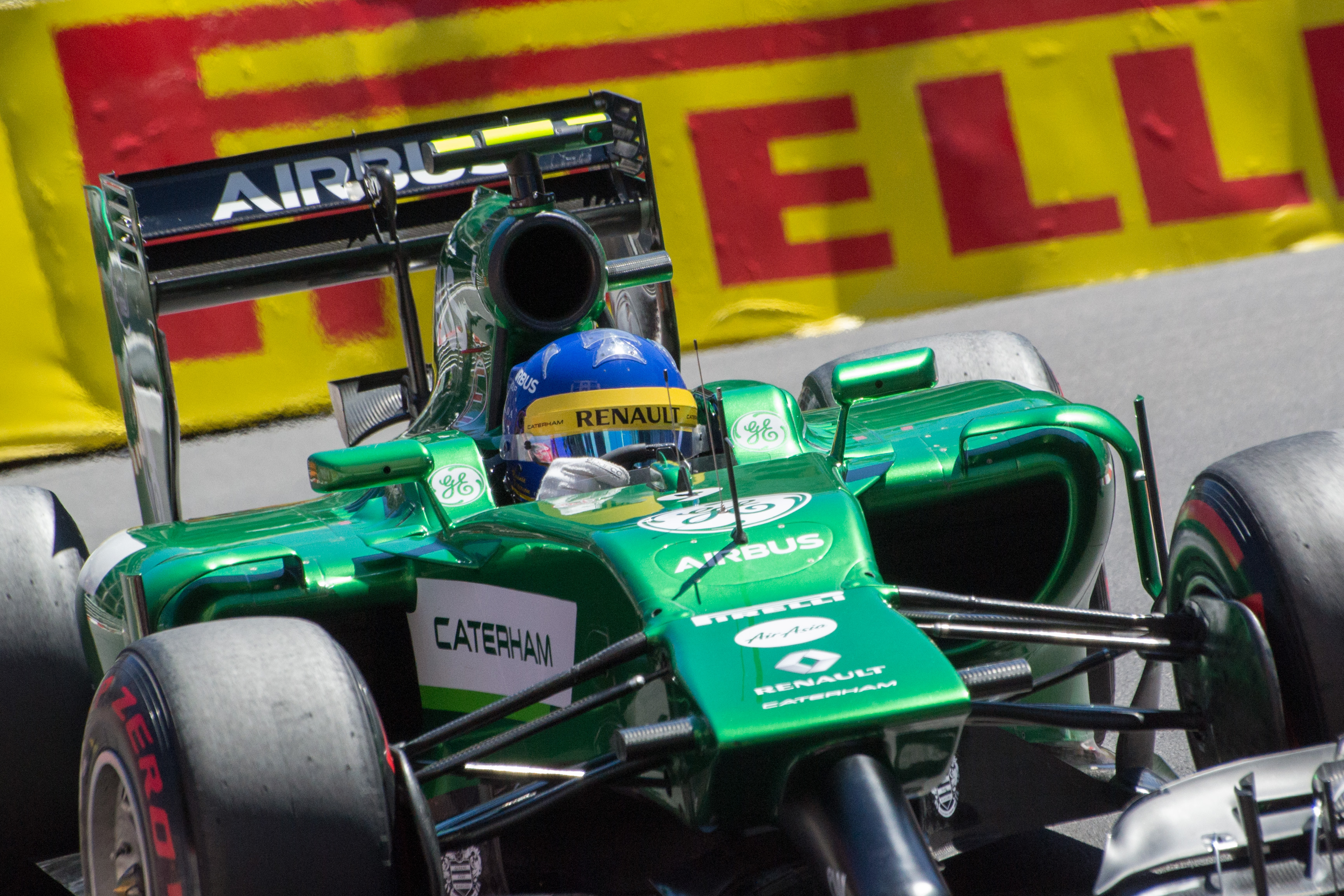
Ericsson during the 2014 Monaco Grand Prix where he wore a special helmet in tribute to famous Swedish Formula One driver Ronnie Peterson

Ericsson qualified 20th in his debut race– the 2014 Australian Grand Prix, running 11th before he fell back with oil pressure problems. In Malaysia, he qualified last, finishing 14th in front of main rival Max Chilton. In Spain, he outqualified Kobayashi for the first time in his career, but he was behind both Marussia cars. He finished the race in 20th position, the last classified finisher. In the next race, the Monaco Grand Prix, he was involved in a collision with Williams driver Felipe Massa during qualifying, which resulted in Massa not advancing to the second part of the qualifying session. Ericsson was penalised with two penalty points and had to start from the pit lane. He finished in 11th place, just missing out on his and Caterham's first points.

After this, Ericsson suffered a crash in the rain in Hungary, when he lost control of his car on the exit of turn three and hit the barriers. He was unhurt, but the car was destroyed. In the Belgian Grand Prix he battled with the Marussias again, losing 16th place to Chilton on the penultimate lap. In Singapore, he finished in 15th place and in Japan, he out-qualified both Marussias and Kobayashi for 19th position. He started 17th, but spun behind the safety car in heavy rain, and had to fight back from last place. He finished 17th, in front of both Marussias and Kobayashi, but his performance was overshadowed by the crash of Bianchi. At the inaugural Russian Grand Prix, he qualified in a career-best 17th position, missing out on making it into Q2 by only 0.15 seconds. During the race, he started 16th but fell back, finishing 19th overall but in front of his main rivals– the other Caterham and the sole Marussia of Chilton, who both eventually retired from the race.

Due to Caterham F1 falling into administration on 21 October 2014, neither team driver was able to compete at the United States Grand Prix. Despite this, Ericsson flew to Texas to commentate the race for Swedish television and secured a new drive for 2015. Ericsson terminated his contract with Caterham on 12 November. He eventually finished the season in 19th position, highest of the Caterham drivers that took part in 2014.

=== Sauber (2015–2019) ===
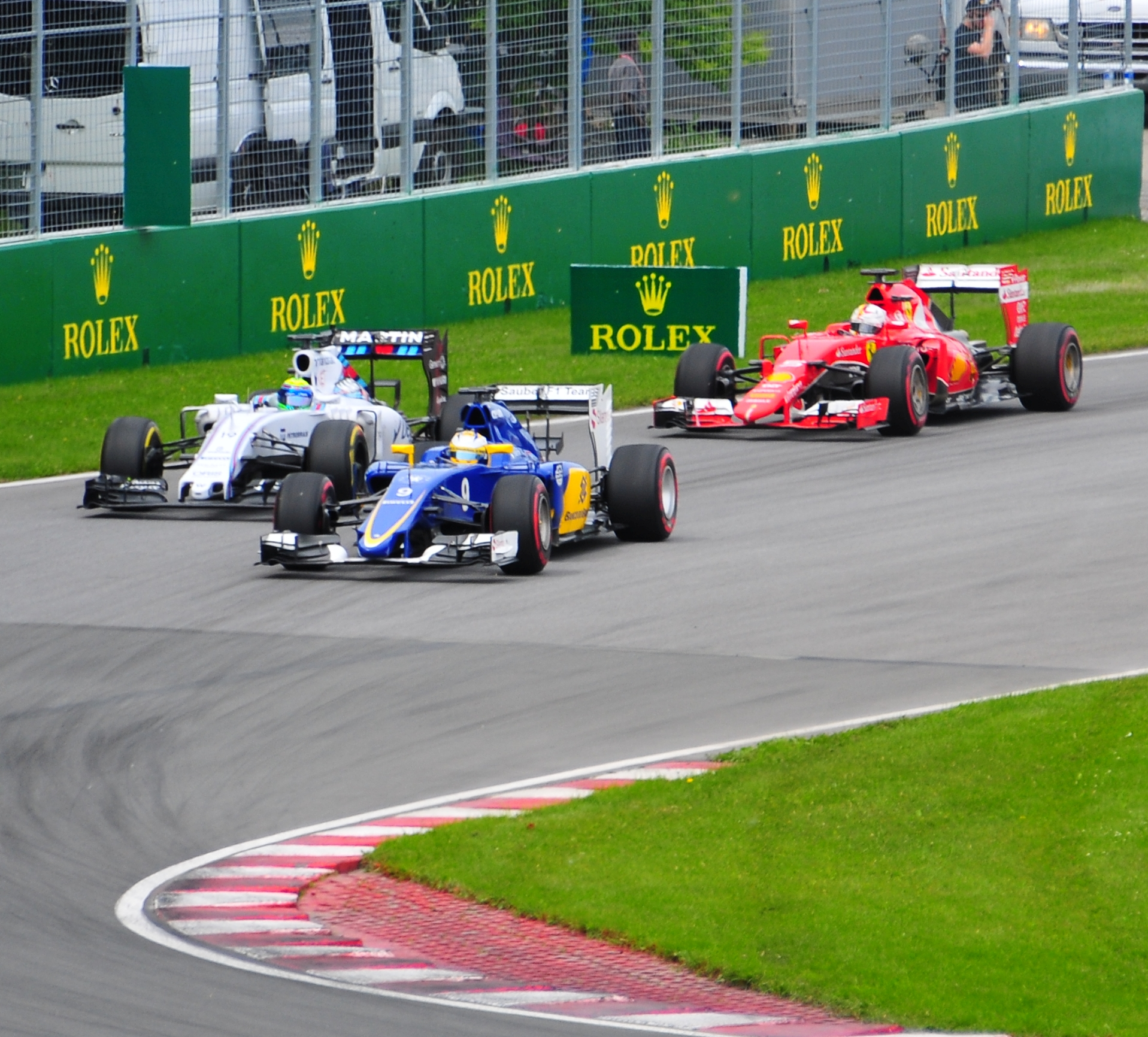
Ericsson (centre) leading Felipe Massa and Sebastian Vettel at the 2015 Canadian Grand Prix

==== 2015 ====
At the 2014 United States Grand Prix, on 1 November 2014, Sauber announced that it had signed Ericsson for 2015. In his first race with the team in Australia, Ericsson finished in eighth position, recording the first points-scoring finish by a Swedish driver since Stefan Johansson finished third at the 1989 Portuguese Grand Prix.

Malaysia was the first time that Ericsson made it into Q3, qualifying tenth but was ultimately promoted to ninth. He spun on the fourth lap after an unsuccessful overtaking attempt on Force India's Nico Hülkenberg which resulted in retirement. In China, Ericsson again made it into Q3 in qualifying, again qualifying tenth. He finished the race in the same position, scoring one point after Max Verstappen's engine failed with only a few laps remaining. In Bahrain he qualified outside the top-ten, and held eighth position when a pit stop error caused him to fall down the field, and he ultimately finished the race in 14th position. In the first European leg of the season he finished 14th in Spain and 13th in Monaco.

In the 2015 British Grand Prix he finished 11th – just outside the points. He scored one more point before the summer break, with a tenth-place finish in Hungary, followed by another tenth position in Belgium. At the Italian Grand Prix Ericsson qualified for Q3, where he ended up tenth, before he was given a grid penalty for blocking Nico Hülkenberg in Q1. Ericsson eventually finished ninth– taking his fifth points position for the year and again being in front of teammate Felipe Nasr.

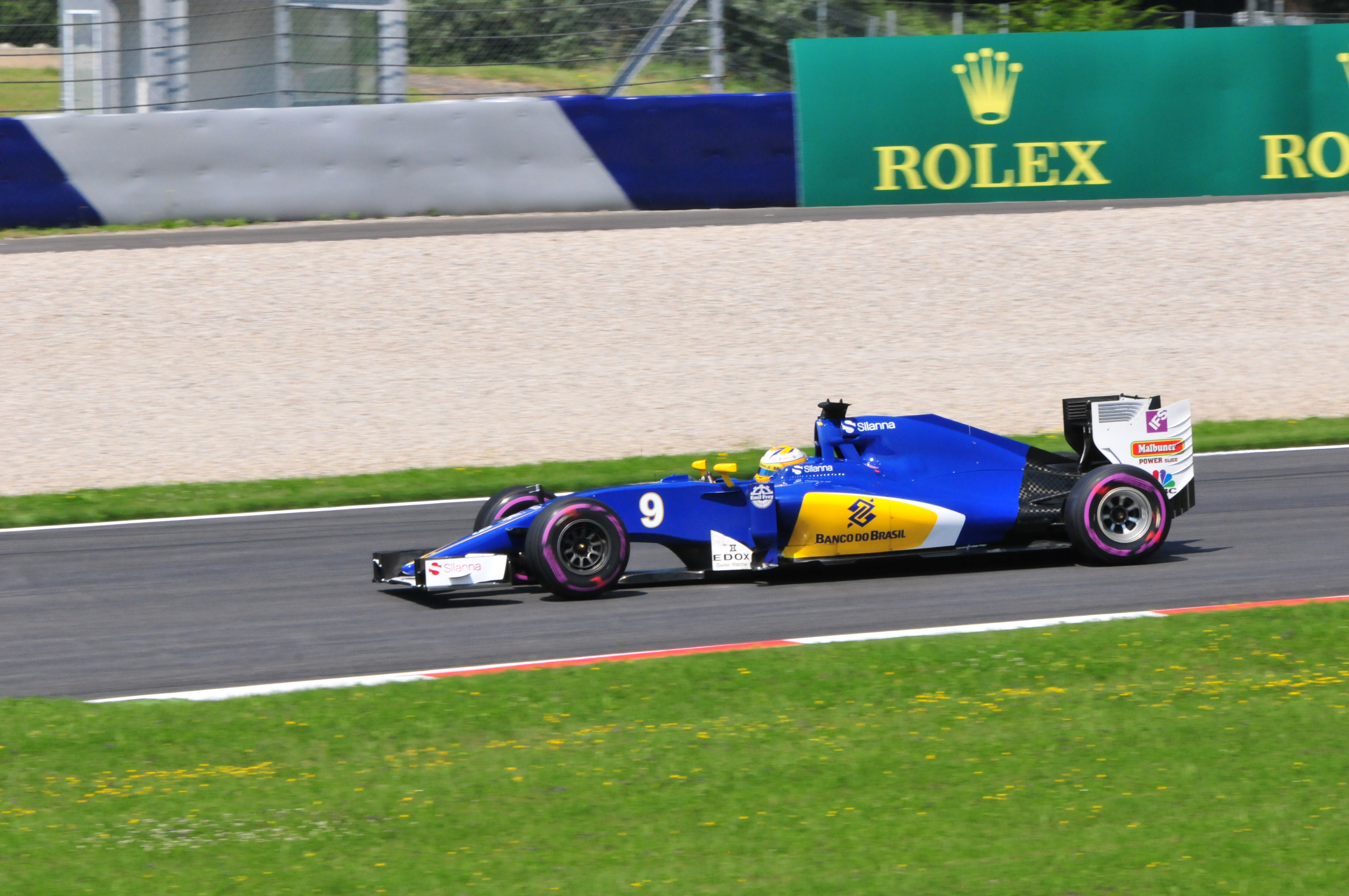
Ericsson driving the C35 Sauber at the 2016 Austrian Grand Prix

During the summer break, Sauber announced that Ericsson along with Nasr had both extended their deals with the team for the 2016 season.

==== 2016 ====
In 2016, Sauber missed pre-season testing due to financial concerns hurting their car development for 2016. Ericsson was running 15th before vibrations forced his retirement in Australia and finished twelfth in Bahrain in the next round. He ran just outside the points in China but steadily dropped to sixteenth, which was still enough to finish ahead of his teammate. In Russia, he recovered from contact on the first lap of the race to take 14th at the finish. In Spain, he finished twelfth, but in Monaco, he was deemed to be at fault for a collision with his teammate, resulting in a grid penalty for Canada that made him start from the back. The following races saw him finishing 17th in Baku and 15th in Austria, with qualifying crashes in Silverstone and Hungary forcing him to start from the pit lane.

In Monza, Ericsson finished 16th whilst in Singapore he made it into Q2 and was close to scoring his first point until a strategic error from the team. He ran close to the points in Malaysia and Suzuka, in front of his teammate in qualifying and the race. In Austin, he ran 11th for part of the race but dropped to 14th by the checkered flag, and in Mexico, he recovered from a first lap crash to finish eleventh, just outside of the points. He crashed out of the race in Brazil but finished 15th in Abu Dhabi.

==== 2017 ====
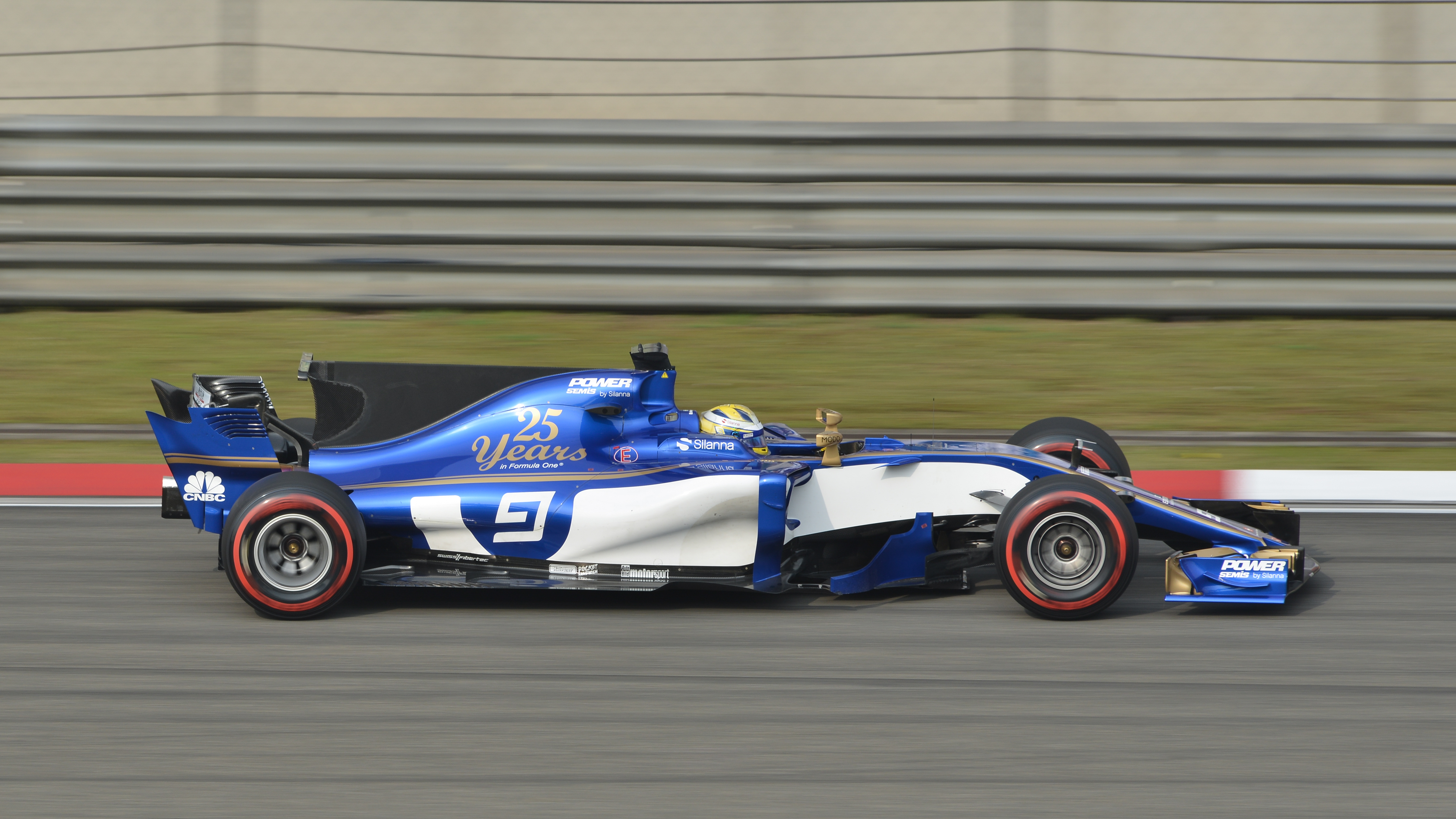
Ericsson driving the C36 Sauber at the 2017 Chinese Grand Prix

Ericsson's 2017 campaign did not start well as a hydraulic issue in Australia caused him to have to retire. He qualified 14th and finished 15th in China. He struggled to match his teammate Wehrlein in Bahrain with his race ending in another retirement caused by a gearbox failure. He finished 15th in Russia, ahead of his teammate for the first time over the season. Ericsson got his best result of the season of 11th in Azerbaijan where he fought for points with his teammate. Sauber started to struggle in Monaco with Ericsson crashing into the barrier while overtaking the safety car to get on the lead lap. He finished 13th in Canada and would fail to score points for the rest of the season.

==== 2018 ====
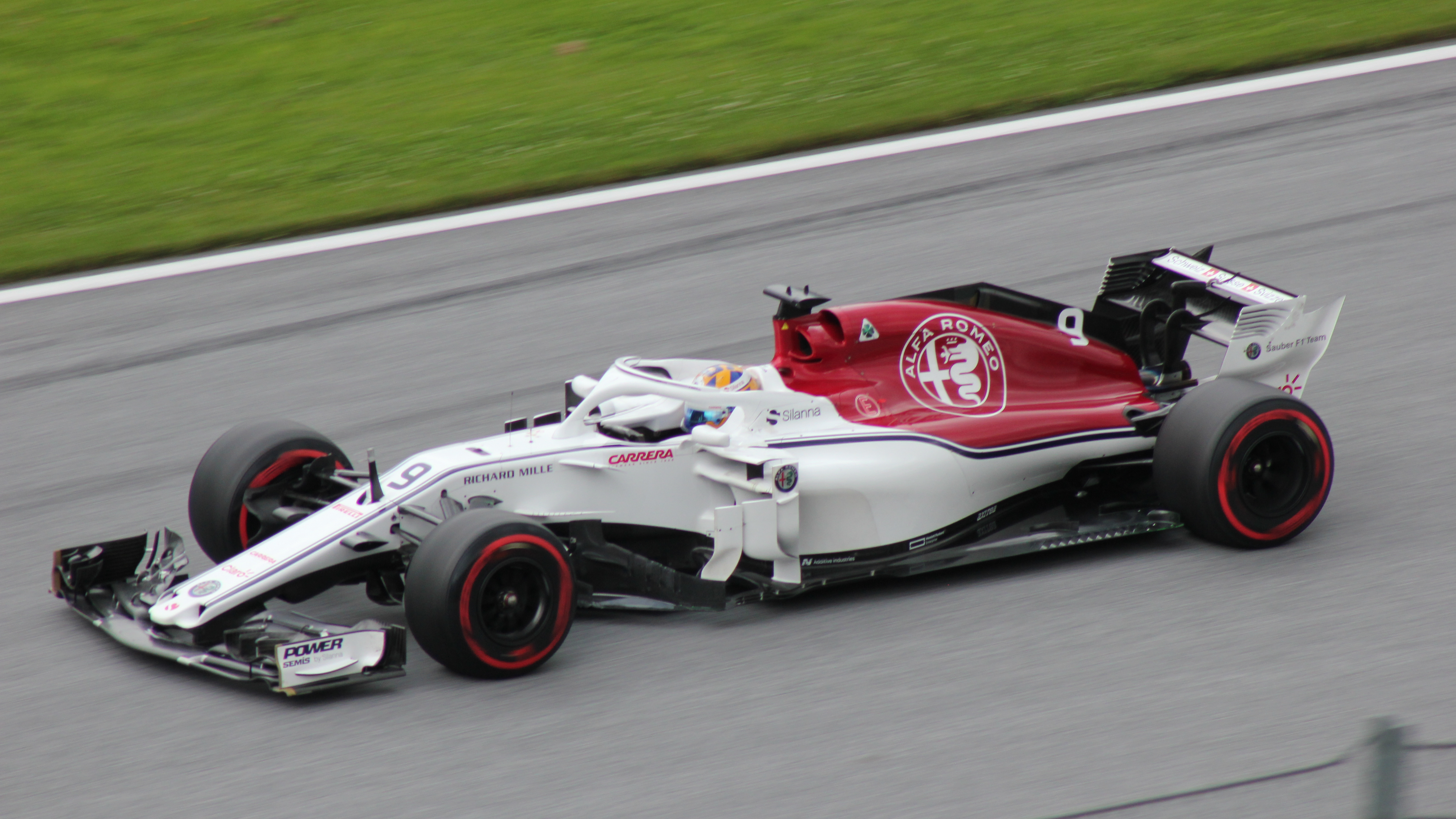
Ericsson driving the C37 Sauber at the 2018 Austrian Grand Prix

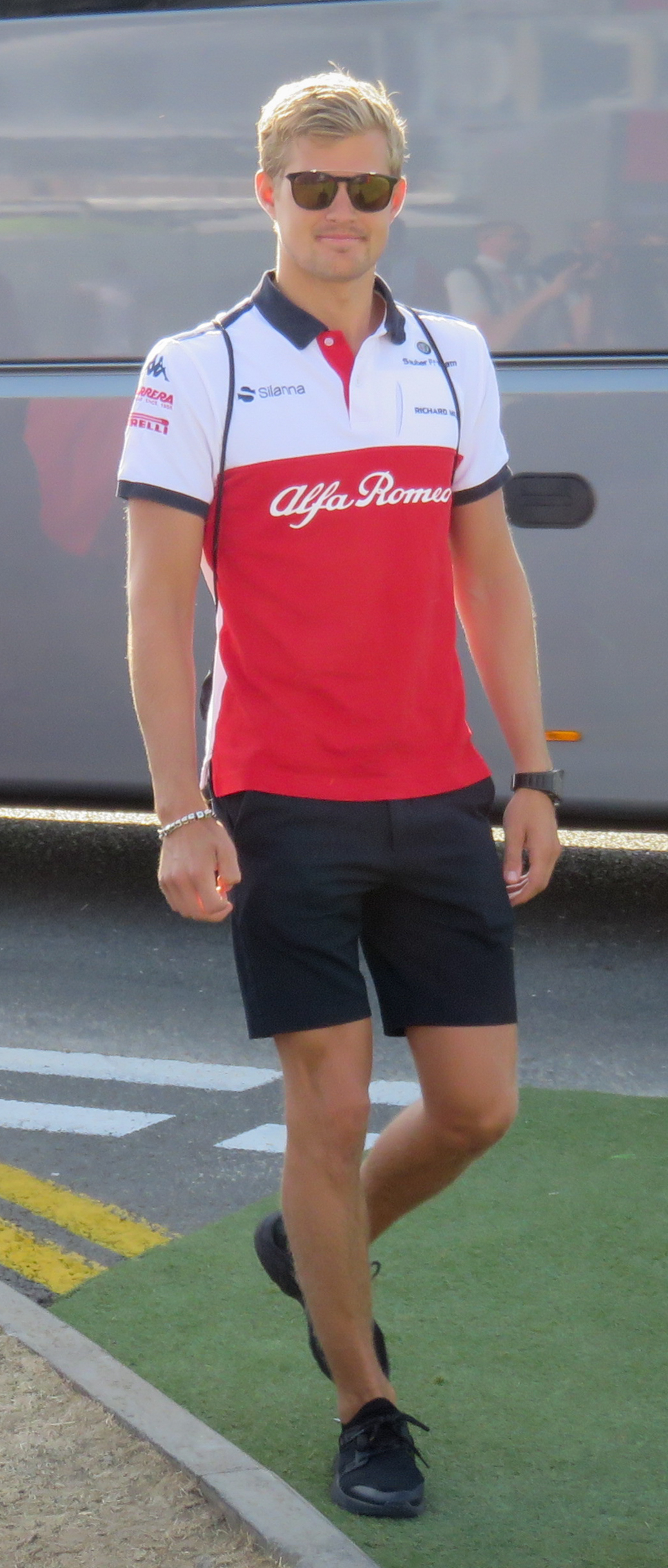
Ericsson in 2018

For 2018, Ericsson retained his seat at Sauber, which became the Alfa Romeo Sauber F1 team in partnership with the Italian car maker. Alongside him was new teammate Charles Leclerc. At the Bahrain Grand Prix, Ericsson finished in ninth place, scoring his first points since the 2015 Italian Grand Prix, after a total of 49 races without scoring a point. He then scored further points at the Austrian, German, Belgian, USA and Mexican Grands Prix. At the Italian Grand Prix, Ericsson had a high speed accident in second practice, when his DRS system failed, causing the car to lose control into turn 1 and slam the wall. Ericsson's car rolled three times before coming to rest on its wheels, but he was uninjured.

==== 2019 ====
Just before the 2018 Russian Grand Prix, it was announced that Ericsson was to be replaced at Sauber by Antonio Giovinazzi, but would remain with the team as their third driver and brand ambassador.

== IndyCar ==
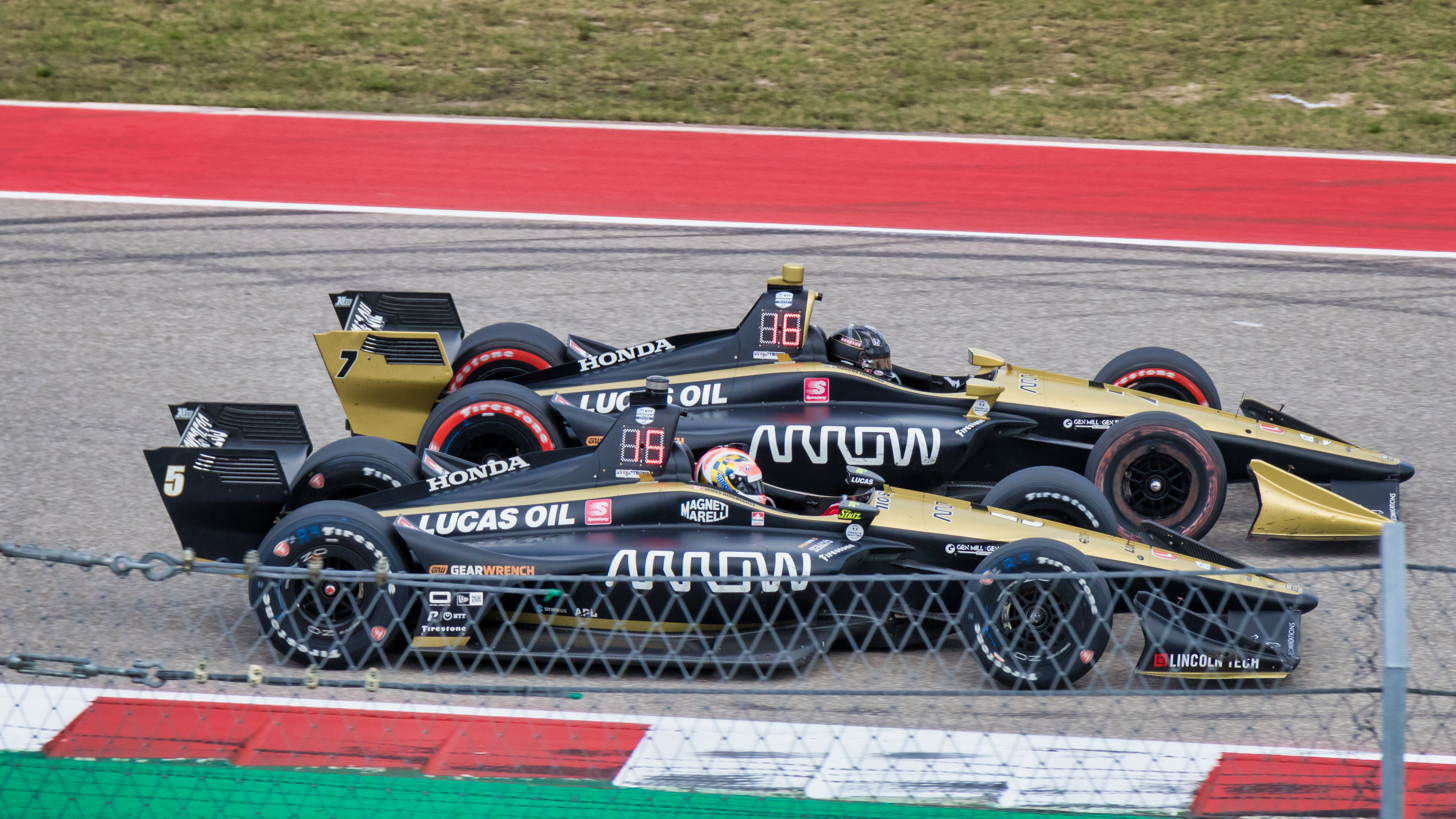
Ericsson (No. 7) driving for Schmidt Peterson Motorsports in 2019

On 30 October 2018, it was announced that Ericsson would race full-time for Schmidt Peterson Motorsports in the 2019 IndyCar Series.

=== Schmidt Peterson Motorsports (2019): Rookie season ===
During his rookie year, Ericsson scored a podium finish at the Detroit Grand Prix. In September, he missed the Grand Prix of Portland as he was on standby for an injured Kimi Räikkönen at the Belgian Grand Prix; Räikkönen would ultimately run the race. Ericsson ended the 2019 season 17th in points.

=== Chip Ganassi Racing (2020–2023) ===
==== 2020: Sophomore season ====
Ericsson moved to Chip Ganassi Racing for the 2020 IndyCar Series season. During the pandemic shortened season, he scored top-ten finishes in over half of his races, with his best result being a fourth-place finish at the second race Road America.

==== 2021: Breakout season ====
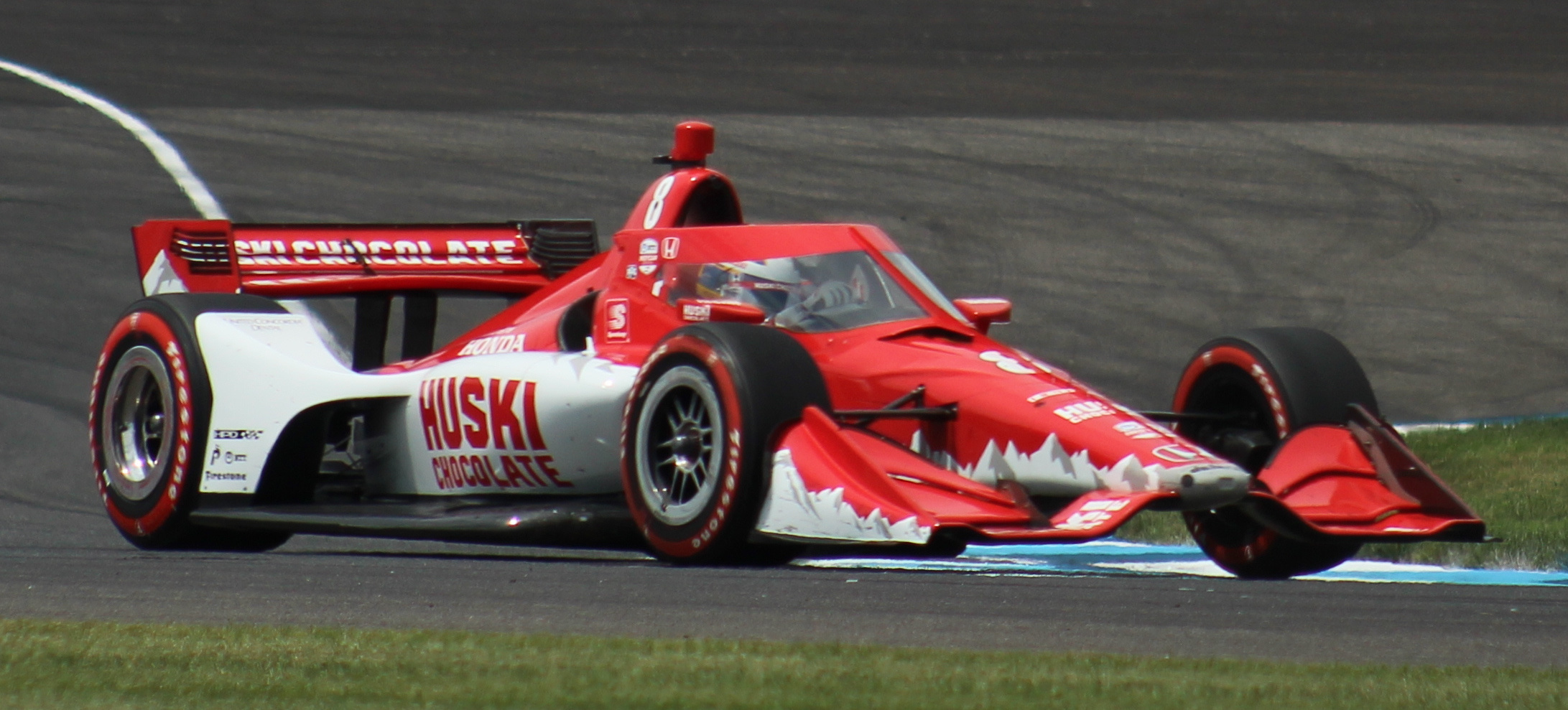
Ericsson driving for Chip Ganassi Racing in 2021

Ericsson was confirmed for longer tenure with Chip Ganassi in October 2020, re-upping for at least another two seasons. 2021 would be Ericsson's breakout year in IndyCar. Although he had middling performances compared to teammates Scott Dixon and Álex Palou before the 2021 Indianapolis 500, Ericsson would outscore both his teammates and the entire IndyCar field following the Indianapolis 500. Ericsson scored his first win in IndyCar and his first win in any category since 2013 in GP2 when he won the first race of the doubleheader in Detroit, a race in which Ericsson benefited from the misfortune of race leader Will Power after Power's car refused to restart during a formation lap following a red flag incident at the end of the race. Ericsson finished second to Josef Newgarden at Mid Ohio and picked up a second victory at the chaotic inaugural round at Nashville, putting him into contention of the series title. Although he would hold top-ten finishes throughout the rest of the season Ericsson would be mathematically eliminated from the championship after a sixth-place finish at Laguna Seca. Ericsson would end the season in sixth place in the driver's championship with 435 points.

==== 2022: Indianapolis 500 winner ====
Ericsson continued to show pace in his third season with Chip Ganassi Racing. He recorded his first podium finish on an oval at the XPEL 375 at the Texas Motor Speedway with a third-place finish. Ericsson, sporting a helmet painted in honor of his countryman and Formula One legend, Ronnie Peterson, won the 2022 Indianapolis 500 under caution after holding off Pato O'Ward on a late restart. Ericsson became the second Swedish driver to win the Indianapolis 500, after Kenny Bräck in 1999. Ericsson's win in the 500 plus solid early season results vaulted him into the points lead of the IndyCar Series championship for the first time in his career. His title challenge continued with a six-race streak of successive top ten finishes, however a second place at Road America ended up being the final podium of his campaign. Ericsson finished sixth in the drivers' standings, being beaten narrowly by teammate Palou.

==== 2023 ====
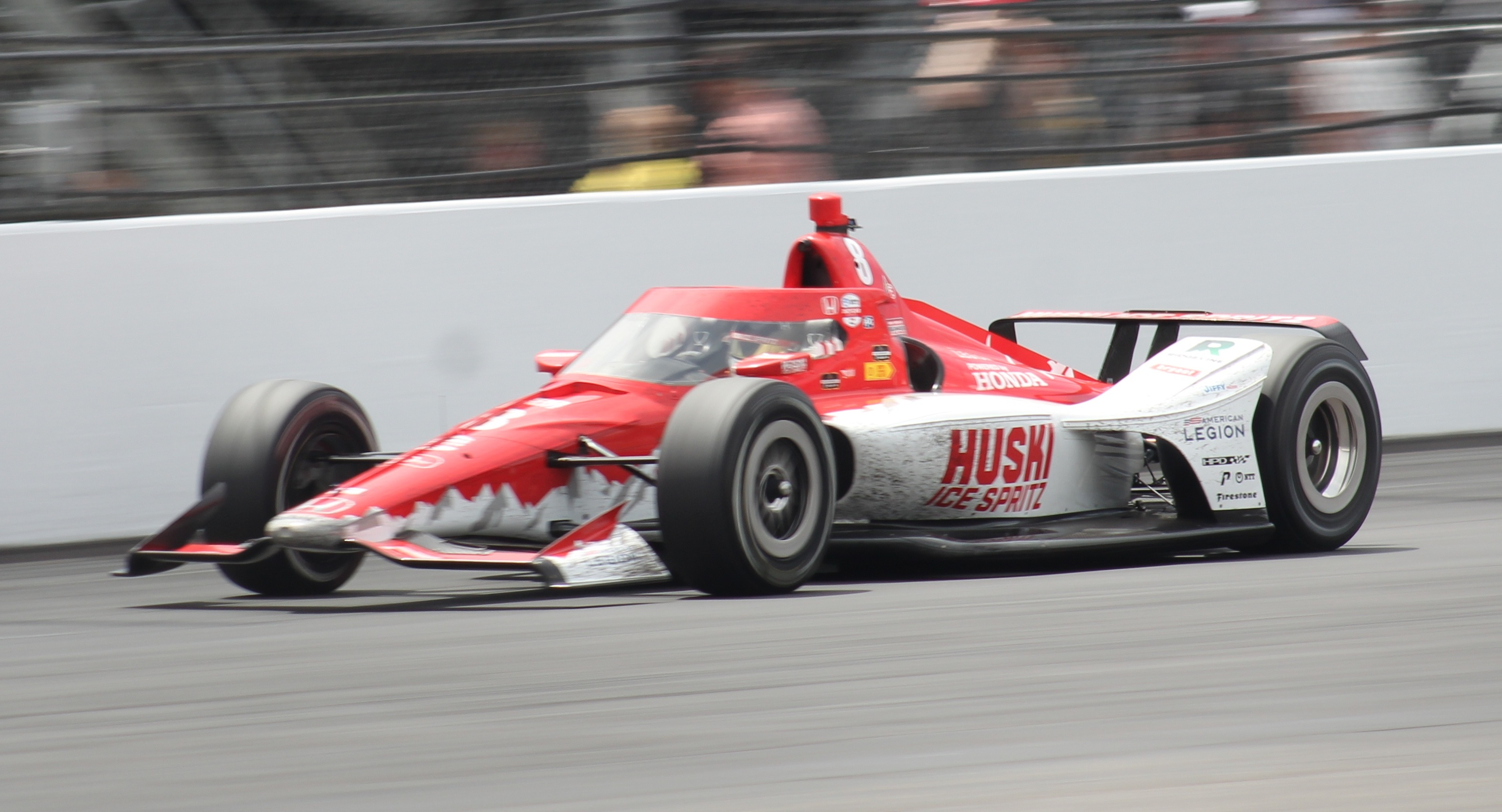
Ericsson driving in the 2023 Indianapolis 500

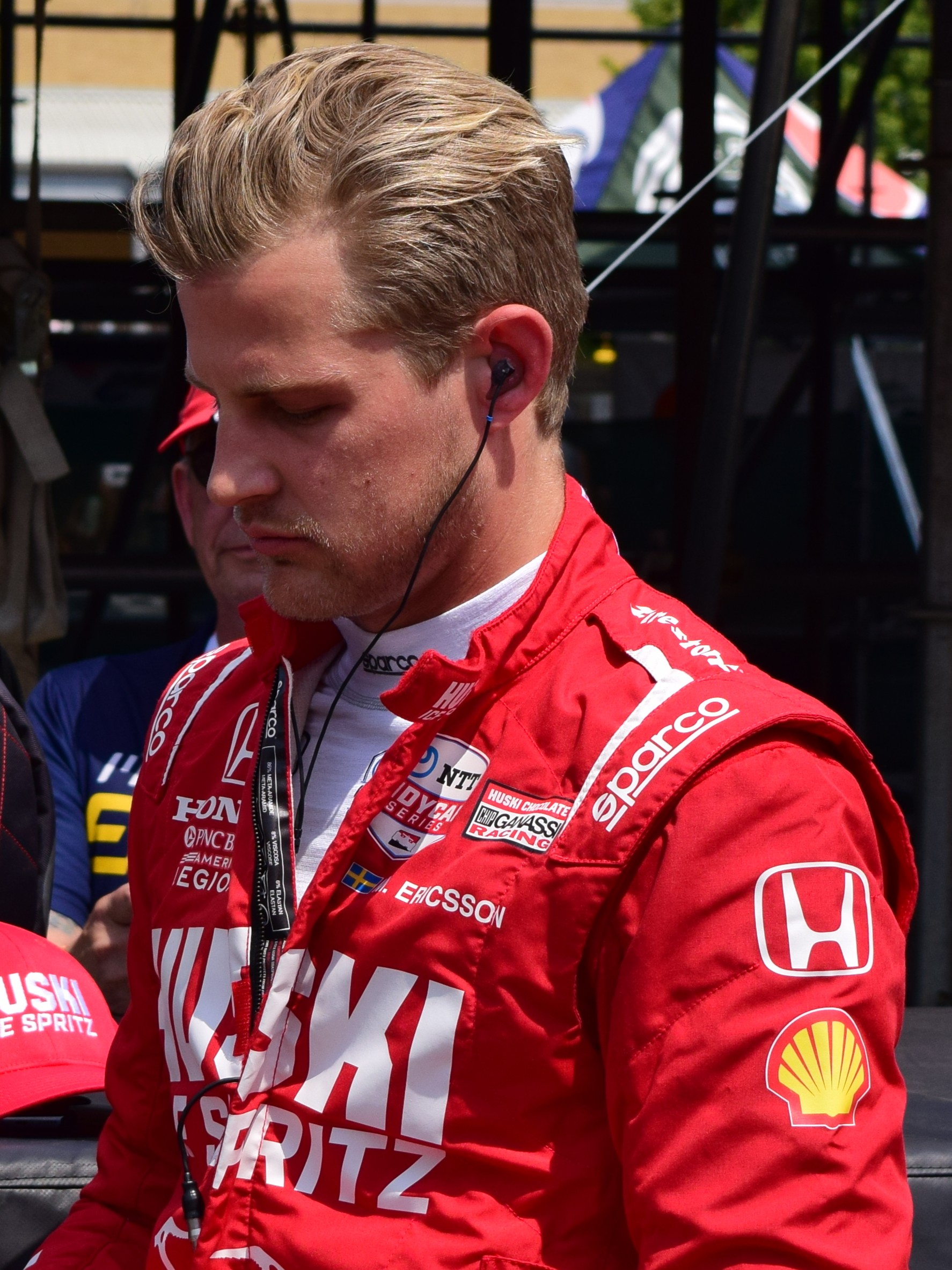
Ericsson during a practice session at the 2023 Honda Indy Toronto

Ericsson started his 2023 campaign by winning the first race of the season in St. Petersburg. Ericsson finished second in the 2023 Indianapolis 500 after being overtaken by Josef Newgarden on the final lap. Ericsson would finish sixth in the standings for the third consecutive year.

=== Andretti Autosport (2024–present) ===
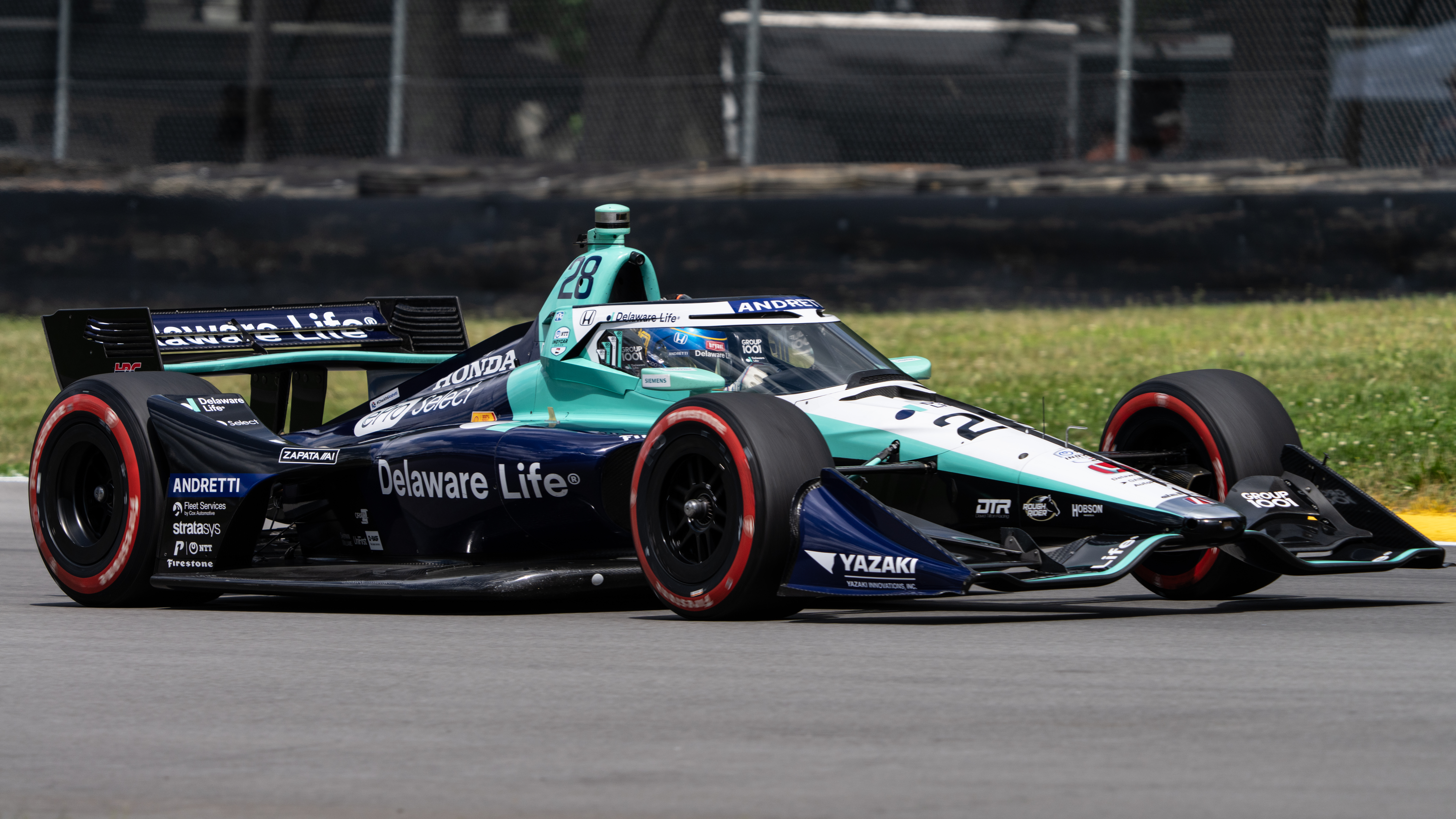
Ericsson's 2024 car for Andretti Autosport

On 23 August 2023, it was announced that Ericsson would be leaving Chip Ganassi Racing and joining Andretti Autosport for 2024.

Ericsson initially finished second in the 2025 Indianapolis 500 but was disqualified after the race due to his car failing the technical inspection.

== Personal life ==
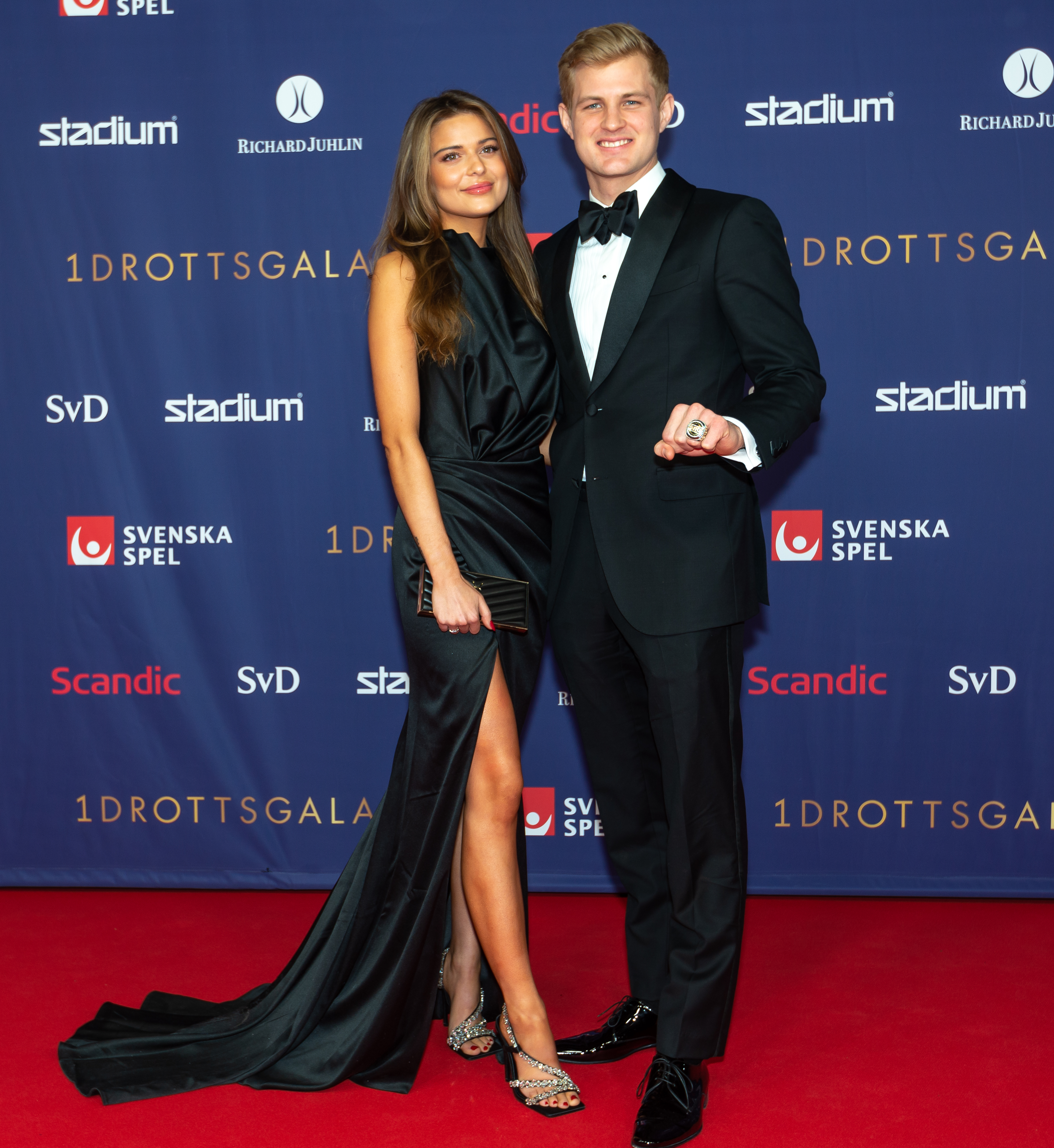
Ericcson and his wife at the 2023 Swedish Sports Awards

Ericsson's younger brother, Hampus, is also a racing driver. Ericsson has stated that he is coaching and mentoring him, and managing his career.

Ericsson is married to Iris Tritsaris Jondahl. The two live in Indianapolis.

== Racing record ==
=== Karting career summary ===
Season	Series	Team	Position
2000	MKR Series Sweden — Formula Micro		18th
2001	MKR Series Sweden — Formula Micro		**3rd**
2002	MKR Series Sweden — Formula Mini		4th
2003	MKR Series Sweden — Formula Mini	SMK Örebro	**1st**
2004	European Championship – Northern Region Qualification — ICA Junior	Ward Racing	18th
2004	Tom Trana Trophy — ICA Junior		**3rd**
2004	South Garda Winter Cup — ICA Junior		17th
2004	European Championship — ICA Junior	Ward Racing	24th
2004	Italian Open Masters — ICA Junior		25th
2004	Swedish Championship — ICA Junior	Ward Racing	4th
2005	South Garda Winter Cup — ICA Junior		10th
2005	Torneo Industrie — ICA		**2nd**
2005	Nordic Championship — ICA Junior		**1st**
2005	Italian Open Masters — ICA Junior		**3rd**
2005	European Championship — ICA Junior	Ward Racing	17th
2005	Swedish Championship — ICA Junior	Ward Racing	**1st**
2006	Italian Open Masters — ICA		16th
2006	CIK-FIA European Championship — ICA	Ward Racing	12th
2006	Viking Trophy — ICA	Ward Racing	21st
2006	Andrea Margutti Trophy — ICA		26th
2006	South Garda Winter Cup — ICA		17th
2012	WSK Final Cup — KZ2	Ward Racing	18th

=== Racing career summary ===
Season	Series	Team name	Races	Wins	Poles	F/Laps	Podiums	Points	Position
2007	Formula BMW UK	Fortec Motorsport	18	7	11	6	13	676	**1st**
2008	British Formula 3 Championship	Fortec Motorsport	22	0	2	4	5	141	5th
2008	Macau Grand Prix	Carlin Motorsport	1	0	0	0	0	N/A	NC
2009	All-Japan Formula 3 Championship	TOM'S	16	5	5	9	11	112	**1st**
2009	Macau Grand Prix	TOM'S	1	0	1	0	0	N/A	4th
2009	British Formula 3 Championship	Räikkönen Robertson Racing	6	2	1	0	3	65	11th
2009	Formula One	Brawn GP	Test driver						
2009–10	GP2 Asia Series	ART Grand Prix	2	0	0	0	0	0	24th
2009–10	GP2 Asia Series	Super Nova Racing	2	0	0	0	0	0	24th
2010	GP2 Series	Super Nova Racing	20	1	0	0	1	11	17th
2011	GP2 Series	iSport International	18	0	0	0	2	25	10th
2011	GP2 Asia Series	iSport International	4	0	0	0	1	9	6th
2011	GP2 Final	iSport International	2	0	0	0	1	10	**2nd**
2012	GP2 Series	iSport International	24	1	0	1	5	124	8th
2013	GP2 Series	DAMS	22	1	2	3	5	121	6th
2014	Formula One	Caterham F1 Team	16	0	0	0	0	0	19th
2015	Formula One	Sauber F1 Team	19	0	0	0	0	9	18th
2016	Formula One	Sauber F1 Team	21	0	0	0	0	0	22nd
2017	Formula One	Sauber F1 Team	20	0	0	0	0	0	20th
2018	Formula One	Alfa Romeo Sauber F1 Team	21	0	0	0	0	9	17th
2019	IndyCar Series	Arrow Schmidt Peterson Motorsports	16	0	0	1	1	290	17th
2019	Formula One	Alfa Romeo Racing	Reserve driver						
2020	IndyCar Series	Chip Ganassi Racing	14	0	0	1	0	291	12th
2021	IndyCar Series	Chip Ganassi Racing	16	2	0	1	3	435	6th
2022	IndyCar Series	Chip Ganassi Racing	17	1	0	1	3	506	6th
2022	IMSA SportsCar Championship - DPi	Cadillac Racing	1	0	0	0	0	275	23rd
2022	Porsche Carrera Cup Scandinavia	Porsche Experience Racing	2	0	0	1	0	21	18th
2023	IndyCar Series	Chip Ganassi Racing	17	1	0	0	3	438	6th
2023	Porsche Carrera Cup Scandinavia	Porsche Experience Racing	2	0	0	0	0	14	22nd
2024	IndyCar Series	Andretti Global	17	0	0	2	1	297	15th
2024	IMSA SportsCar Championship - GTP	Wayne Taylor Racing with Andretti	1	0	0	0	0	245	33rd
2025	IndyCar Series	Andretti Global	17	0	0	0	0	234	20th
2025–26	24H Series Middle East - GT3	Leipert Motorsport							
2026	IMSA SportsCar Championship - GTD	Wayne Taylor Racing	1	0	0	0	0	249	66th
2026	IndyCar Series	Andretti Global	18	1	1	1	2	429	7th
2026	GT World Challenge America - Pro-Am	Random Vandals Racing	1	0	0	0	0	0	NC†

^{*} Season still in progress.

=== Complete Formula BMW UK results ===
(key) (Races in bold indicate pole position) (Races in italics indicate fastest lap)

Year	Team	1	2	3	4	5	6	7	8	9	10	11	12	13	14	15	16	17	18	DC	Pts
2007	Fortec Motorsport	BRH; 1; 3	**BRH**; **2**; 1	ROC; 1; 4	ROC; 2; 3	THR; 1; 2	THR; 2; 5	CRO; 1; 2	**CRO**; **2**; 2	**OUL**; **1** Ret	**OUL**; **2**; 1	DON; 1; 2	**DON**; **2**; 5	**SNE**; **1**; 1	**SNE**; **2**; 12	**BRH**; **1**; 1	**BRH**; **2**; 1	**KNO**; **1**; 1	**KNO**; **2**; 1	1st	676

=== Complete British Formula Three Championship results ===
(key) (Races in bold indicate pole position) (Races in italics indicate fastest lap)

Year	Team	Chassis	Engine	1	2	3	4	5	6	7	8	9	10	11	12	13	14	15	16	17	18	19	20	21	22	DC	Pts
2008	Fortec Motorsport	Dallara F308	Mercedes HWA	OUL; 1; 6	OUL; 2; 2	**CRO**; **1**; 5	CRO; 2 Ret	MOZ; 1; 7	MOZ; 2; 7	ROC; 1; 2	ROC; 2; 10	SNE; 1; 6	SNE; 2; 8	THR; 1; 2	THR; 2 Ret	BRH; 1; 5	**BRH**; **2** Ret	SPA; 1; 7	SPA; 2; 5	SIL; 1; 3	SIL; 2; 2	BUC; 1; 11	BUC; 2; 12	DON; 1; 8	DON; 2; 7	5th	141
2009	Räikkönen Robertson Racing	Dallara F309	Mercedes HWA	OUL; 1	OUL; 2	SIL; 1	SIL; 2	ROC; 1; 2	**ROC**; **2**; 1	HOC; 1; 1	HOC; 2; 4	SNE; 1	SNE; 2	DON; 1	DON; 2	SPA; 1	SPA; 2	SIL; 1	SIL; 2	ALG; 1	ALG; 2	BRH; 1; 4	BRH; 2; 3			11th	65

=== Complete Japanese Formula 3 Championship results ===
(key) (Races in bold indicate pole position) (Races in italics indicate fastest lap)

Year	Team	Engine	1	2	3	4	5	6	7	8	9	10	11	12	13	14	15	16	DC	Pts
2009	Petronas Team TOM'S	Toyota	**FUJ**; **1**; 2	FUJ; 2; 3	OKA; 1; 10	OKA; 2; 10	SUZ; 1; 1	SUZ; 2; 2	FUJ; 1; 2	**FUJ**; **2**; 1	SUZ; 1; 5	**SUZ**; **2**; 1	**MOT**; **1**; 1	MOT; 2; 5	AUT; 1; 2	AUT; 2; 6	SUG; 1; 2	**SUG**; **2**; 1	1st	112

=== Complete GP2 Series results ===
(key) (Races in bold indicate pole position; races in italics indicate fastest lap)

Year	Entrant	1	2	3	4	5	6	7	8	9	10	11	12	13	14	15	16	17	18	19	20	21	22	23	24	DC	Points
2010	Super Nova Racing	CAT; FEA; 11	CAT; SPR; Ret	MON; FEA; 12	MON; SPR; 9	IST; FEA; Ret	IST; SPR; Ret	VAL; FEA; 7	VAL; SPR; 1	SIL; FEA; 12	SIL; SPR; 18	HOC; FEA; 6	HOC; SPR; Ret	HUN; FEA; 12	HUN; SPR; 10	SPA; FEA; 13	SPA; SPR; 7	MNZ; FEA; Ret	MNZ; SPR; 11	YMC; FEA; 11	YMC; SPR; Ret					17th	11
2011	iSport International	IST; FEA; 9	IST; SPR; 8	CAT; FEA; 5	CAT; SPR; 3	MON; FEA; Ret	MON; SPR; Ret	VAL; FEA; Ret	VAL; SPR; 11	SIL; FEA; 3	SIL; SPR; 4	NÜR; FEA; 5	NÜR; SPR; 16	HUN; FEA; 5	HUN; SPR; 16	SPA; FEA; Ret	SPA; SPR; 12	MNZ; FEA; 14	MNZ; SPR; 8							10th	25
2012	iSport International	SEP; FEA; 13	SEP; SPR; Ret	BHR1; FEA; 13	BHR1; SPR; 16	BHR2; FEA; 7	BHR2; SPR; 7	CAT; FEA; 13	CAT; SPR; 22	MON; FEA; 2	MON; SPR; 4	VAL; FEA; 2	VAL; SPR; Ret	SIL; FEA; 21	SIL; SPR; 7	HOC; FEA; 11	HOC; SPR; 15	HUN; FEA; 18	HUN; SPR; Ret	SPA; FEA; 1	SPA; SPR; 4	MNZ; FEA; 3	MNZ; SPR; 7	MRN; FEA; 7	MRN; SPR; 2	8th	124
2013	DAMS	SEP; FEA; Ret	SEP; SPR; 13	BHR; FEA; 13	BHR; SPR; Ret	**CAT**; **FEA**; Ret	CAT; SPR; 20	MON; FEA; Ret	MON; SPR; 18	**SIL**; **FEA**; 11	SIL; SPR; 8	NÜR; FEA; 1	NÜR; SPR; 13	HUN; FEA; 2	HUN; SPR; 4	SPA; FEA; 2	SPA; SPR; 15	MNZ; FEA; Ret	MNZ; SPR; 23	MRN; FEA; 7	MRN; SPR; 2	YMC; FEA; 3	YMC; SPR; 6			6th	121

==== Complete GP2 Asia Series results ====
(key) (Races in bold indicate pole position; races in italics indicate fastest lap)

Year	Entrant	1	2	3	4	5	6	7	8	DC	Points
2009–10	ART Grand Prix	YMC1; FEA; 11	YMC1; SPR; 12							24th	0
2009–10	Super Nova Racing			YMC2; FEA; 17	YMC2; SPR; 12	BHR1; FEA	BHR1; SPR	BHR2; FEA	BHR2; SPR	24th	0
2011	iSport International	YMC; FEA; 4	YMC; SPR; 3	IMO; FEA; 10	IMO; SPR; 16					6th	9

==== Complete GP2 Final results ====
(key) (Races in bold indicate pole position) (Races in italics indicate fastest lap)

Year	Entrant	1	2	DC	Points
2011	iSport International	YMC; FEA; 4	YMC; SPR; 2	2nd	10

=== Complete Formula One results ===
(key) (Races in bold indicate pole position; races in italics indicate fastest lap)

Year	Entrant	Chassis	Engine	1	2	3	4	5	6	7	8	9	10	11	12	13	14	15	16	17	18	19	20	21	WDC	Points
2014	Caterham F1 Team	Caterham CT05	Renault Energy F1‑2014 1.6 V6 t	AUS; Ret	MAL; 14	BHR; Ret	CHN; 20	ESP; 20	MON; 11	CAN; Ret	AUT; 18	GBR; Ret	GER; 18	HUN; Ret	BEL; 17	ITA; 19	SIN; 15	JPN; 17	RUS; 19	USA	BRA	ABU			19th	0
2015	Sauber F1 Team	Sauber C34	Ferrari 060 1.6 V6 t	AUS; 8	MAL; Ret	CHN; 10	BHR; 14	ESP; 14	MON; 13	CAN; 14	AUT; 13	GBR; 11	HUN; 10	BEL; 10	ITA; 9	SIN; 11	JPN; 14	RUS; Ret	USA; Ret	MEX; 12	BRA; 16	ABU; 14			18th	9
2016	Sauber F1 Team	Sauber C35	Ferrari 061 1.6 V6 t	AUS; Ret	BHR; 12	CHN; 16	RUS; 14	ESP; 12	MON; Ret	CAN; 15	EUR; 17	AUT; 15	GBR; Ret	HUN; 20	GER; 18	BEL; Ret	ITA; 16	SIN; 17	MAL; 12	JPN; 15	USA; 14	MEX; 11	BRA; Ret	ABU; 15	22nd	0
2017	Sauber F1 Team	Sauber C36	Ferrari 061 1.6 V6 t	AUS; Ret	CHN; 15	BHR; Ret	RUS; 15	ESP; 11	MON; Ret	CAN; 13	AZE; 11	AUT; 15	GBR; 14	HUN; 16	BEL; 16	ITA; 18^{†}	SIN; Ret	MAL; 18	JPN; Ret	USA; 15	MEX; Ret	BRA; 13	ABU; 17		20th	0
2018	Alfa Romeo Sauber F1 Team	Sauber C37	Ferrari 062 EVO 1.6 V6 t	AUS; Ret	BHR; 9	CHN; 16	AZE; 11	ESP; 13	MON; 11	CAN; 15	FRA; 13	AUT; 10	GBR; Ret	GER; 9	HUN; 15	BEL; 10	ITA; 15	SIN; 11	RUS; 13	JPN; 12	USA; 10	MEX; 9	BRA; Ret	ABU; Ret	17th	9

^{†} Did not finish, but was classified as he had completed more than 90% of the race distance.

=== American open-wheel racing results ===
==== IndyCar Series ====
(key) (Races in bold indicate pole position; races in italics indicate fastest lap)

Year	Team	No.	Chassis	Engine	1	2	3	4	5	6	7	8	9	10	11	12	13	14	15	16	17	18	Rank	Points	Ref
2019	Arrow Schmidt Peterson Motorsports	7	Dallara DW12	Honda	STP; 20	COA; 15	ALA; 7	LBH; 20	IMS; 24	INDY; 23	DET; 13	DET; 2	TXS; 7	ROA; 13	TOR; 20	IOW; 11	MOH; 23	POC; 12	GTW; 16	POR	LAG; 11		17th	290	
2020	Chip Ganassi Racing	8	Dallara DW12	Honda	TXS; 19	IMS; 6	ROA; 10	ROA; 4	IOW; 9	IOW; 9	INDY; 32	GTW; 5	GTW; 23	MOH; 15	MOH; 5	IMS; 10	IMS; 15	STP; 7					12th	291	
2021	Chip Ganassi Racing	8	Dallara DW12	Honda	ALA; 8	STP; 7	TXS; 19	TXS; 12	IMS; 10	INDY; 11	DET; 1	DET; 9	ROA; 6	MOH; 2	NSH; 1	IMS; 9	GTW; 9	POR; 7	LAG; 6	LBH; 28			6th	435	
2022	Chip Ganassi Racing	8	Dallara DW12	Honda	STP; 9	TXS; 3	LBH; 22	ALA; 12	IMS; 4	INDY; 1	DET; 7	ROA; 2	MOH; 6	TOR; 5	IOW; 8	IOW; 6	IMS; 11	NSH; 14	GTW; 7	POR; 11	LAG; 9		6th	506	
2023	Chip Ganassi Racing	8	Dallara DW12	Honda	STP; 1	TXS; 8	LBH; 3	ALA; 10	IMS; 8	INDY; 2	DET; 9	ROA; 6	MOH; 27	TOR; 11	IOW; 4	IOW; 9	NSH; 7	IMS; 10	GTW; 10	POR; 7	LAG; 15		6th	438	
2024	Andretti Global	28	Dallara DW12	Honda	STP; 23	THE; DNQ	LBH; 5	ALA; 18	IMS; 16	INDY; 33	DET; 2	ROA; 9	LAG; 10	MOH; 5	IOW; 9	IOW; 23	TOR; 18	GTW; 24	POR; 6	MIL; 27	MIL; 5	NSH; 25	15th	297	
2025	Andretti Global	28	Dallara DW12	Honda	STP; 6	THE; 21	LBH; 12	ALA; 20	IMS; 26	INDY; 31	DET; 13	GTW; 13	ROA; 21	MOH; 12	IOW; 15	IOW; 22	TOR; 5	LAG; 25	POR; 22	MIL; 19	NSH; 15		20th	234	
2026	Andretti Global	28	Dallara DW12	Honda	STP; 6	PHX; 17	**ARL**; 4	ALA; 9	LBH; 25	IMS; 22	INDY; 13	DET; 8	GTW; 2*	ROA; 13	MOH; 21	NSH; 6	POR; 6	MRK; 1	WSH; 4	MIL; 8	MIL; 9	LAG; 9	7th	429	

==== Indianapolis 500 ====
Year	Chassis	Engine	Start	Finish	Team
2019	Dallara	Honda	13	23	Arrow Schmidt Peterson Motorsports
2020	Dallara	Honda	11	32	Chip Ganassi Racing
2021	Dallara	Honda	9	11	Chip Ganassi Racing
2022	Dallara	Honda	5	1	Chip Ganassi Racing
2023	Dallara	Honda	10	2	Chip Ganassi Racing
2024	Dallara	Honda	32	33	Andretti Global
2025	Dallara	Honda	9	31	Andretti Global
2026	Dallara	Honda	17	13	Andretti Global

=== Complete IMSA SportsCar Championship results ===
(key) (Races in bold indicate pole position; races in italics indicate fastest lap)

Year	Entrant	No.	Class	Make	Engine	1	2	3	4	5	6	7	8	9	10	Rank	Points
2022	Cadillac Racing	02	DPi	Cadillac DPi-V.R	Cadillac 5.5 L V8	DAY; 6	SEB	LBH	LGA	MOH	DET	WGL	MOS	ELK	PET	23rd	275
2024	Wayne Taylor Racing with Andretti	10	GTP	Acura ARX-06	Acura AR24e 2.4 L Turbo V6	DAY; 9	SEB	LBH	LGA	DET	WGL	ELK	IMS	PET		33rd	245
2026	Wayne Taylor Racing		GTD	Lamborghini Huracán GT3 Evo 2	Lamborghini DGF 5.2 L V10	DAY; 8	SEB	LBH	LGA	WGL	MOS	ELK	VIR	IMS	PET	66th	249

Sporting positions
Preceded by Niall Breen	Formula BMW UK; Champion; 2007	Succeeded by Series merged into Formula BMW Europe
Preceded by Carlo van Dam	All-Japan Formula Three; Champion; 2009	Succeeded by Yuji Kunimoto
Preceded by Hélio Castroneves	Indianapolis 500; Winner; 2022	Succeeded by Josef Newgarden
