= Eric Gandelin =

French engineer

- Born: 12 March 1977 (age 48); Bourg-la-Reine, France
- Occupation: Engineer
- Employer: Audi Revolut F1 Team
- Known for: Formula One engineer
- Title: Chief designer

Eric Gandelin (born 12 March 1977) is a French Formula One engineer. He is currently the chief designer, chassis of the Audi F1 Team.

== Career ==
Gandelin began his motorsport career in 1999 as a Composite Design Engineer at Prost Grand Prix, working on composite structures and chassis components. In 2002, he joined Sauber F1 Team as a Composite Design Engineer, where he continued working on carbon-fibre structures and structural design for the team’s Formula One cars.

In 2008, Gandelin was appointed Head of Concept Design at BMW Sauber, leading early-stage vehicle architecture including overall car layout, crash structures, packaging of major components and the foundational design direction for new Formula One projects. He was promoted to Chief Designer in 2013, overseeing the complete chassis design process and technical integration of Sauber’s Formula One cars.

From July 2017 to July 2021, Gandelin served as Head of Future Car Projects at Sauber, focusing on long-term vehicle concepts, regulation-driven design studies and development programmes aligned with upcoming Formula One technical regulations. Following this period, he returned to the role of Chief Designer, continuing to lead chassis design activities as the Hinwil team evolved to become the Audi Factory Team.
