= 2016 Italian Grand Prix =

Race 14 of 21 in the 2016 Formula One World Championship
| ← Previous race | Next race → |
- Layout of the Monza circuit

Race details
- Date: 4 September 2016
- Official name: Formula 1 Gran Premio Heineken d'Italia 2016
- Location: Autodromo Nazionale di Monza; Monza, Italy
- Course: Permanent racing facility
- Course length: 5.793 km (3.600 miles)
- Distance: 53 laps, 306.720 km (190.587 miles)
- Weather: Sunny, warm
- Attendance: 147,500 (Weekend)

Pole position
| Driver | (United Kingdom) Lewis Hamilton | Mercedes |
- Time: 1:21.135

Fastest lap
| Driver | (Spain) Fernando Alonso | McLaren-Honda |
- Time: 1:25.340 on lap 51

Podium
| First | (Germany) Nico Rosberg | Mercedes |
| Second | (United Kingdom) Lewis Hamilton | Mercedes |
| Third | (Germany) Sebastian Vettel | Ferrari |

The 2016 Italian Grand Prix (formally known as the Formula 1 Gran Premio Heineken d'Italia 2016) was a Formula One motor race held on 4 September 2016 at the Autodromo Nazionale di Monza in Monza, Italy. It was the fourteenth round of the 2016 FIA Formula One World Championship, and marked the 86th running of the Italian Grand Prix and the 81st time the race was held at Monza.

Mercedes driver and winner of the previous year's race, Lewis Hamilton, entered the race leading the World Drivers' Championship by nine points ahead of teammate Nico Rosberg. In the World Constructors' Championship, Mercedes held a lead of 181 points. Red Bull Racing was placed second and Ferrari third.

== Background ==
=== Tyres ===
Pirelli provided the teams with medium, soft and supersoft tyres. Pirelli anticipated that the difference between the different compounds would be less than one second per lap, with the differences between soft and supersoft to be around 0.7 of a second, and the difference between soft and medium about 0.9 seconds.

== Qualifying ==
| Pos. | Car no. | Driver | Constructor | Qualifying times | | | Final grid |
| Pos. | Car no. | Driver | Constructor | Q1 | Q2 | Q3 | Final grid |
|---|---|---|---|---|---|---|---|
| 1 | 44 | (United Kingdom) Lewis Hamilton | Mercedes | 1:21.854 | 1:21.498 | 1:21.135 | 1 |
| 2 | 6 | (Germany) Nico Rosberg | Mercedes | 1:22.497 | 1:21.809 | 1:21.613 | 2 |
| 3 | 5 | (Germany) Sebastian Vettel | Ferrari | 1:23.077 | 1:22.275 | 1:21.972 | 3 |
| 4 | 7 | (Finland) Kimi Räikkönen | Ferrari | 1:23.217 | 1:22.568 | 1:22.065 | 4 |
| 5 | 77 | (Finland) Valtteri Bottas | Williams-Mercedes | 1:23.264 | 1:22.499 | 1:22.388 | 5 |
| 6 | 3 | (Australia) Daniel Ricciardo | Red Bull Racing-TAG Heuer | 1:23.158 | 1:22.638 | 1:22.389 | 6 |
| 7 | 33 | (Netherlands) Max Verstappen | Red Bull Racing-TAG Heuer | 1:23.229 | 1:22.857 | 1:22.411 | 7 |
| 8 | 11 | (Mexico) Sergio Pérez | Force India-Mercedes | 1:23.439 | 1:22.922 | 1:22.814 | 8 |
| 9 | 27 | (Germany) Nico Hülkenberg | Force India-Mercedes | 1:23.259 | 1:22.951 | 1:22.836 | 9 |
| 10 | 21 | (Mexico) Esteban Gutiérrez | Haas-Ferrari | 1:23.386 | 1:22.856 | 1:23.184 | 10 |
| 11 | 19 | (Brazil) Felipe Massa | Williams-Mercedes | 1:23.489 | 1:22.967 | | 11 |
| 12 | 8 | (France) Romain Grosjean | Haas-Ferrari | 1:23.421 | 1:23.092 | | 17^{1} |
| 13 | 14 | (Spain) Fernando Alonso | McLaren-Honda | 1:23.783 | 1:23.273 | | 12 |
| 14 | 94 | (Germany) Pascal Wehrlein | MRT-Mercedes | 1:23.760 | 1:23.315 | | 13 |
| 15 | 22 | (United Kingdom) Jenson Button | McLaren-Honda | 1:23.666 | 1:23.399 | | 14 |
| 16 | 55 | (Spain) Carlos Sainz Jr. | Toro Rosso-Ferrari | 1:23.661 | 1:23.496 | | 15 |
| 17 | 26 | (Russia) Daniil Kvyat | Toro Rosso-Ferrari | 1:23.825 | | | 16 |
| 18 | 12 | (Brazil) Felipe Nasr | Sauber-Ferrari | 1:23.956 | | | 18 |
| 19 | 9 | (Sweden) Marcus Ericsson | Sauber-Ferrari | 1:24.087 | | | 19 |
| 20 | 30 | (United Kingdom) Jolyon Palmer | Renault | 1:24.230 | | | 20 |
| 21 | 20 | (Denmark) Kevin Magnussen | Renault | 1:24.436 | | | 21 |
107% time: 1:27.583
| – | 31 | (France) Esteban Ocon | MRT-Mercedes | No time | | | 22^{1,}^{2} |

Notes

- ^1 – Romain Grosjean and Esteban Ocon received a five-place grid penalty for an unscheduled gearbox change.
- ^2 – Esteban Ocon failed to set a lap time in qualifying. His participation in the race was at the discretion of the stewards.

== Race ==
Lewis Hamilton started poorly and was overtaken by his teammate Nico Rosberg, Sebastian Vettel, Kimi Räikkönen, Valtteri Bottas and Daniel Ricciardo. Rosberg went into a comfortable lead with Hamilton slowly recovering, firstly picking off Ricciardo then Bottas shortly afterwards. Hamilton didn't have the pace or tyres to catch his teammate Rosberg who went on to win the race. Sebastian Vettel finished third ahead of his Ferrari teammate Räikkönen. Ricciardo took 5th ahead of Bottas.

=== Race classification ===
| Pos. | No. | Driver | Constructor | Laps | Time/Retired | Grid | Points |
|---|---|---|---|---|---|---|---|
| 1 | 6 | (Germany) Nico Rosberg | Mercedes | 53 | 1:17:28.089 | 2 | 25 |
| 2 | 44 | (United Kingdom) Lewis Hamilton | Mercedes | 53 | +15.070 | 1 | 18 |
| 3 | 5 | (Germany) Sebastian Vettel | Ferrari | 53 | +20.990 | 3 | 15 |
| 4 | 7 | (Finland) Kimi Räikkönen | Ferrari | 53 | +27.561 | 4 | 12 |
| 5 | 3 | (Australia) Daniel Ricciardo | Red Bull Racing-TAG Heuer | 53 | +45.295 | 6 | 10 |
| 6 | 77 | (Finland) Valtteri Bottas | Williams-Mercedes | 53 | +51.015 | 5 | 8 |
| 7 | 33 | (Netherlands) Max Verstappen | Red Bull Racing-TAG Heuer | 53 | +54.236 | 7 | 6 |
| 8 | 11 | (Mexico) Sergio Pérez | Force India-Mercedes | 53 | +1:04.954 | 8 | 4 |
| 9 | 19 | (Brazil) Felipe Massa | Williams-Mercedes | 53 | +1:05.617 | 11 | 2 |
| 10 | 27 | (Germany) Nico Hülkenberg | Force India-Mercedes | 53 | +1:18.656 | 9 | 1 |
| 11 | 8 | (France) Romain Grosjean | Haas-Ferrari | 52 | +1 Lap | 17 | |
| 12 | 22 | (United Kingdom) Jenson Button | McLaren-Honda | 52 | +1 Lap | 14 | |
| 13 | 21 | (Mexico) Esteban Gutiérrez | Haas-Ferrari | 52 | +1 Lap | 10 | |
| 14 | 14 | (Spain) Fernando Alonso | McLaren-Honda | 52 | +1 Lap | 12 | |
| 15 | 55 | (Spain) Carlos Sainz Jr. | Toro Rosso-Ferrari | 52 | +1 Lap | 15 | |
| 16 | 9 | (Sweden) Marcus Ericsson | Sauber-Ferrari | 52 | +1 Lap | 19 | |
| 17 | 20 | (Denmark) Kevin Magnussen | Renault | 52 | +1 Lap | 21 | |
| 18 | 31 | (France) Esteban Ocon | MRT-Mercedes | 51 | +2 Laps | 22 | |
| Ret^{1} | 26 | (Russia) Daniil Kvyat | Toro Rosso-Ferrari | 36 | Battery | 16 | |
| Ret | 94 | (Germany) Pascal Wehrlein | MRT-Mercedes | 26 | Oil leak | 13 | |
| Ret | 30 | (United Kingdom) Jolyon Palmer | Renault | 7 | Collision damage | 20 | |
| Ret^{2} | 12 | (Brazil) Felipe Nasr | Sauber-Ferrari | 6 | Collision damage | 18 | |

Notes

- ^1 – Daniil Kvyat received a 5-second time penalty for speeding in the pit-lane, which was added to his finishing time (despite his being retired and not classified in the race).
- ^2 – Felipe Nasr received a 10-second penalty for causing a collision with Jolyon Palmer, which, unlike Kvyat's penalty, was not added to his finishing time.

== Championship standings after the race ==
Drivers' Championship standings

| Pos. | Driver | Points |
|---|---|---|
| 1 | (United Kingdom) Lewis Hamilton | 250 |
| 2 | (Germany) Nico Rosberg | 248 |
| 3 | (Australia) Daniel Ricciardo | 161 |
| 4 | (Germany) Sebastian Vettel | 143 |
| 5 | (Finland) Kimi Räikkönen | 136 |

Constructors' Championship standings

| | Pos. | Constructor | Points |
|---|---|---|---|
| | 1 | (Germany) Mercedes | 498 |
| | 2 | (Austria) Red Bull Racing-TAG Heuer | 290 |
| | 3 | (Italy) Ferrari | 279 |
| 1 | 4 | (United Kingdom) Williams-Mercedes | 111 |
| 1 | 5 | Force India-Mercedes | 108 |

- Note: Only the top five positions are included for both sets of standings.

== See also ==
- 2016 Monza GP2 Series round
- 2016 Monza GP3 Series round

| Previous race: 2016 Belgian Grand Prix | FIA Formula One World Championship; 2016 season | Next race: 2016 Singapore Grand Prix |
| Previous race: 2015 Italian Grand Prix | Italian Grand Prix | Next race: 2017 Italian Grand Prix |
