= 2016 Formula One World Championship =

67th season of FIA Formula One World Championship

The 2016 FIA Formula One World Championship was the 70th season of the Fédération Internationale de l'Automobile (FIA)'s Formula One motor racing. It featured the 67th Formula One World Championship, a motor racing championship for Formula One cars which is recognised by the sport's governing body, the FIA, as the highest class of competition for open-wheel racing cars. Teams and drivers took part in twenty-one Grands Prix—making for the longest season in the sport's history to that point—starting in Australia on 20 March and finishing in Abu Dhabi on 27 November as they competed for the World Drivers' and World Constructors' championships.

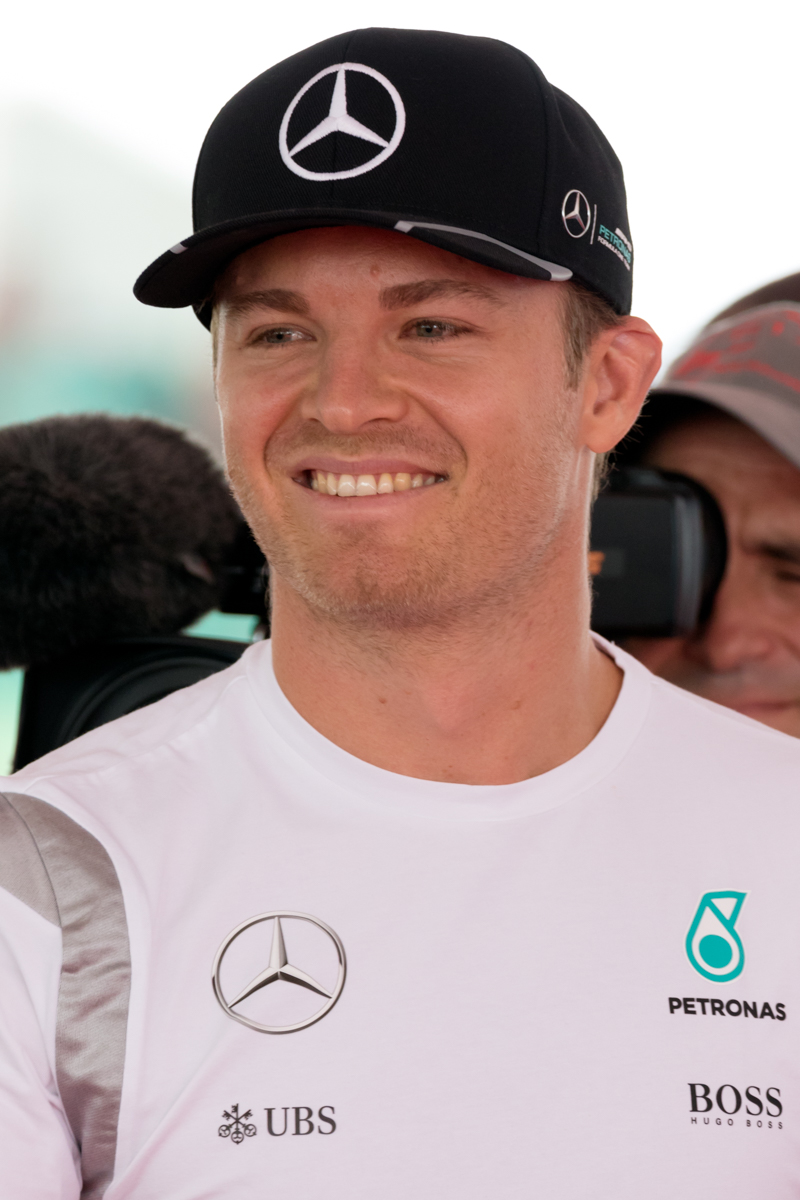
Nico Rosberg won his first and only World Drivers' Championship, shortly before announcing his retirement from the sport.

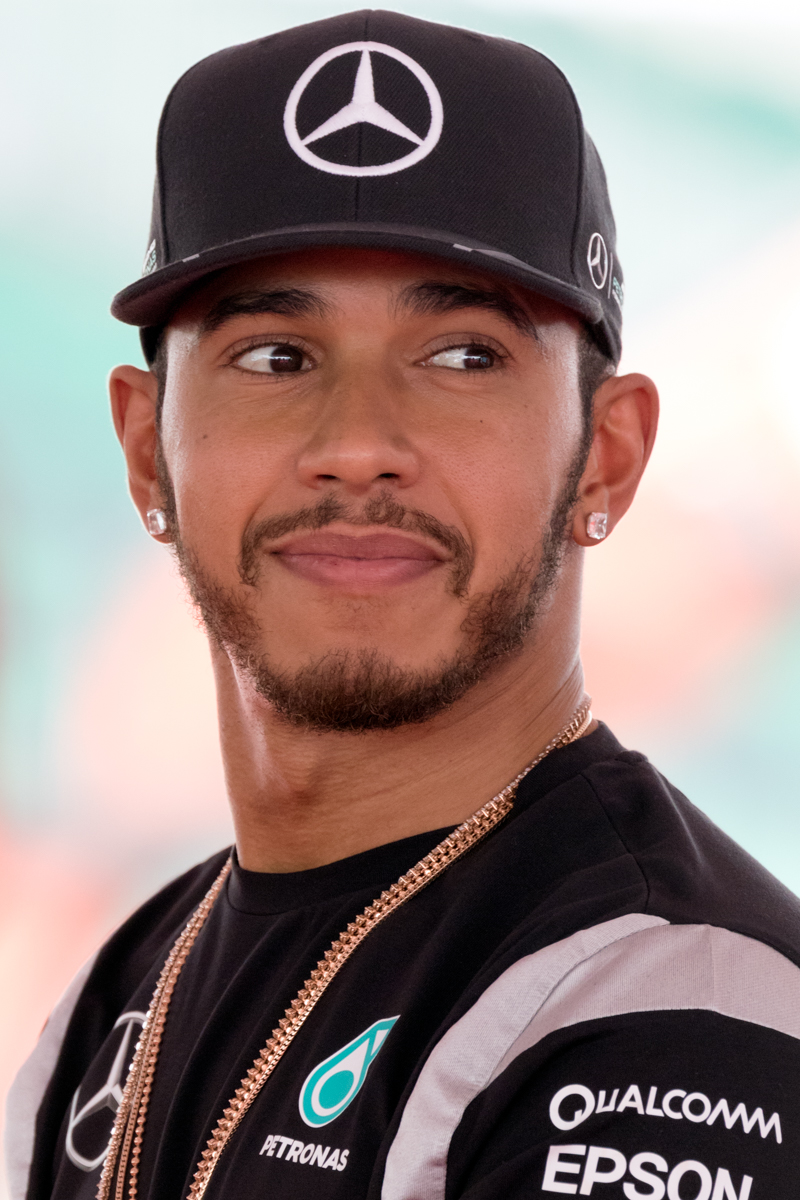
Lewis Hamilton, the then three-time and defending World Champion, finished runner-up by 5 points driving for Mercedes.

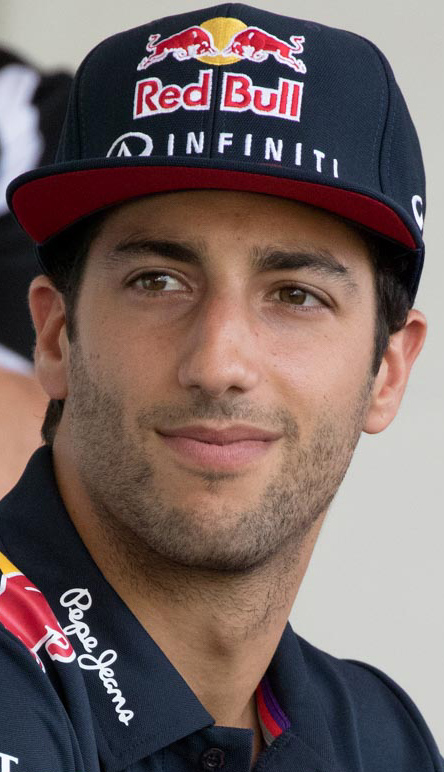
Daniel Ricciardo (pictured in 2015) finished the season in third place, driving for Red Bull.

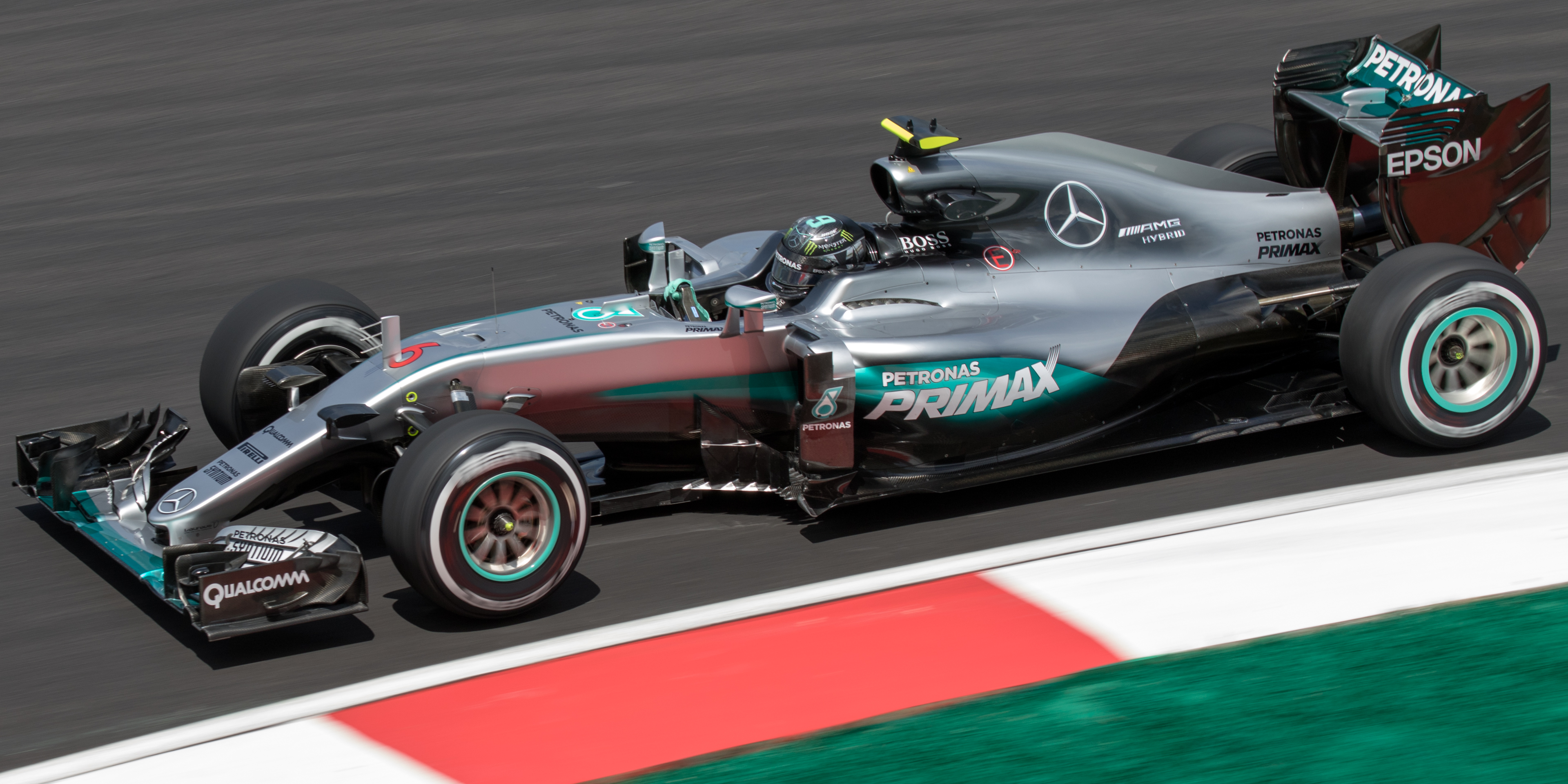
Mercedes successfully defended their World Constructors' title in a highly dominant performance, winning 19 of the 21 races ran during the season.

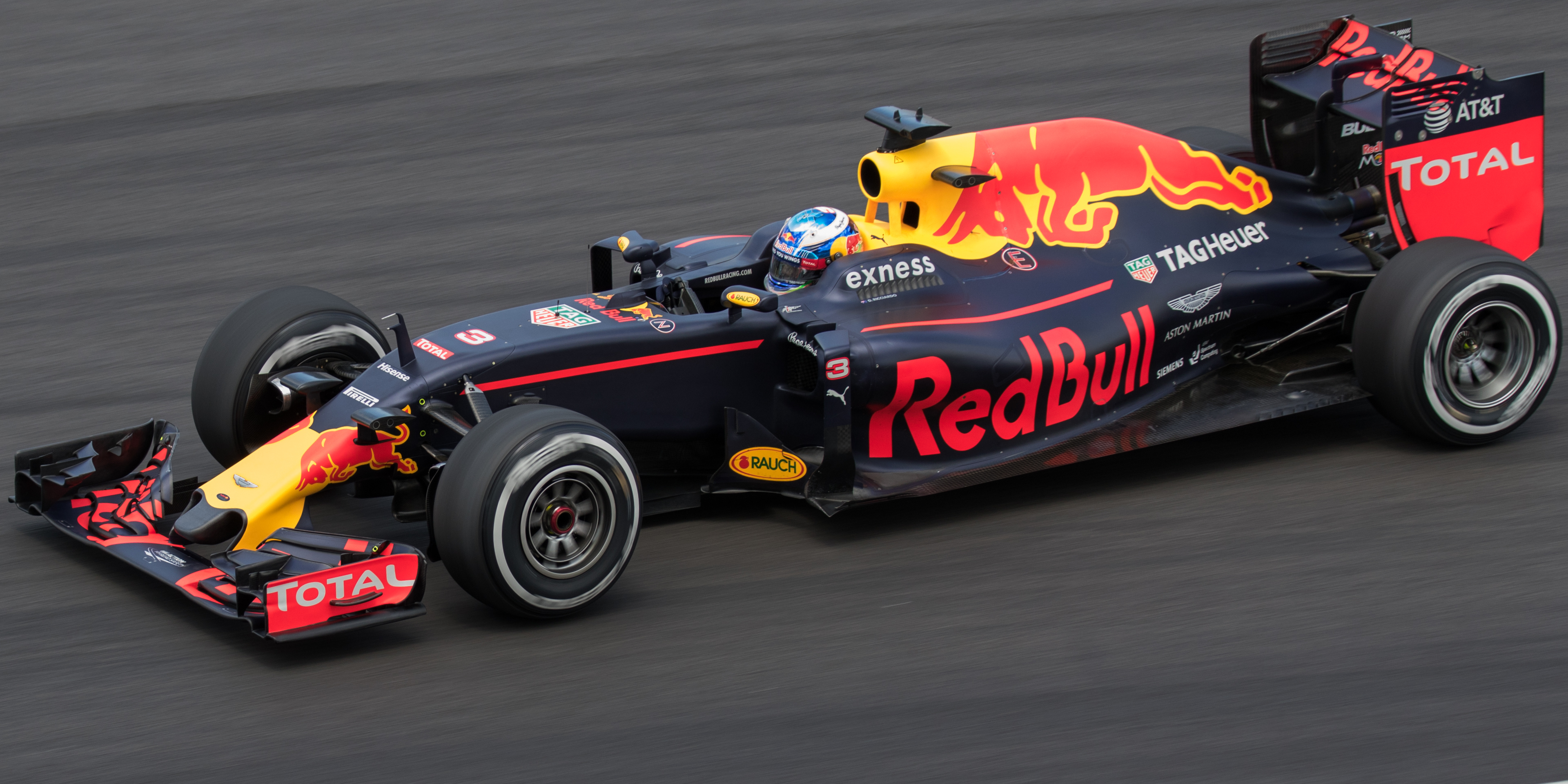
Red Bull Racing finished second in the Constructors' Championship.

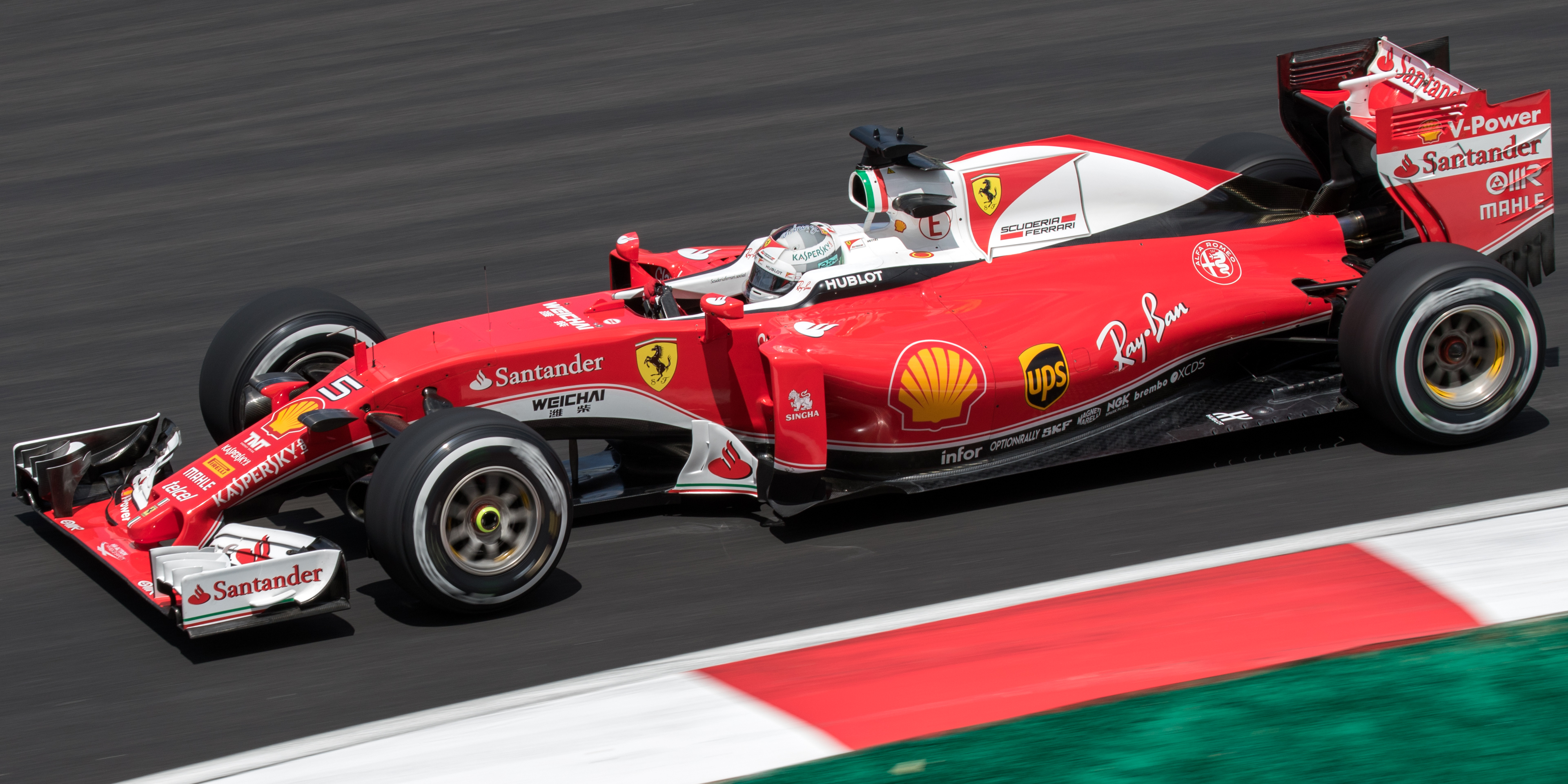
Ferrari finished third in the Constructors' Championship.

The 2016 season saw the grid expand to twenty-two cars with the addition of the Haas F1 Team entry. Renault returned to the sport as a constructor after a four-year absence following their takeover of Lotus prior to the start of the season. The calendar similarly expanded, with the return of the German Grand Prix. The European Grand Prix was also revived, with the event visiting a new circuit in Azerbaijan's capital city, Baku.

Nico Rosberg won his only World Drivers' Championship title in the final race of the season. With nine wins and seven other podiums, Rosberg beat teammate and defending World Champion Lewis Hamilton by five points, despite Hamilton winning more races than Rosberg throughout the season. In doing so, Rosberg followed the success of his father in 1982 - becoming the second son of a champion to become champion himself, a feat previously achieved by Damon Hill in 1996 and the third title winner for Mercedes. Rosberg announced his retirement from the sport shortly after winning the title, effectively ending the on-track Silver War between the Mercedes duo.

In the World Constructors' Championship, Mercedes successfully defended their title for the second consecutive year with a then-record points tally of 765 points, beating Red Bull Racing by 297 points. Ferrari finished third overall, a further seventy points behind.

As of 2026, this is the last championship for a German driver. This was the last season to be held during Bernie Ecclestone's tenure as Chief Executive of the Formula One Group. Ecclestone would be removed from his role on 23 January 2017 after nearly 40 years in the job following Liberty Media's purchase of the sport from CVC Capital Partners. It was the final full season for 2009 World Champion Jenson Button, who would only make one more Grand Prix appearance at the 2017 Monaco Grand Prix. Renault also returned as a full works manufacturer team for the first time in over six years.

== Entries ==
The following teams and drivers took part in the 2016 Formula One World Championship. All teams competed with tyres supplied by Pirelli.

Entrant	Constructor	Chassis	Power unit	Race drivers		
Entrant	Constructor	Chassis	Power unit	No.	Driver name	Rounds
(Italy) Scuderia Ferrari	Ferrari	SF16-H	Ferrari 061	5; 7	(Germany) Sebastian Vettel (Finland) Kimi Räikkönen	All; All
Sahara Force India F1 Team	Force India-Mercedes	VJM09	Mercedes PU106C Hybrid	11; 27	(Mexico) Sergio Pérez (Germany) Nico Hülkenberg	All; All
(United States) Haas F1 Team	Haas-Ferrari	VF-16	Ferrari 061	8; 21	(France) Romain Grosjean (Mexico) Esteban Gutiérrez	All; All
(United Kingdom) McLaren Honda Formula 1 Team	McLaren-Honda	MP4-31	Honda RA616H	14; 47; 22	(Spain) Fernando Alonso (Belgium) Stoffel Vandoorne (United Kingdom) Jenson Button	1, 3–21; 2 All
(Germany) Mercedes AMG Petronas F1 Team	Mercedes	F1 W07 Hybrid	Mercedes PU106C Hybrid	6; 44	(Germany) Nico Rosberg (United Kingdom) Lewis Hamilton	All; All
(United Kingdom) Manor Racing MRT (Note: Manor entered rounds 1–12 as "Pertamina Manor Racing MRT".)	MRT-Mercedes	MRT05	Mercedes PU106C Hybrid	88; 31; 94	(Indonesia) Rio Haryanto (France) Esteban Ocon (Germany) Pascal Wehrlein	1–12; 13–21; All
(Austria) Red Bull Racing	Red Bull Racing-TAG Heuer	RB12	TAG Heuer F1-2016 (Note: Red Bull Racing used Renault R.E.16 power units. For sponsorship purposes, these engines were rebadged as "TAG Heuer".)	3; 26; 33	(Australia) Daniel Ricciardo (Russia) Daniil Kvyat (Netherlands) Max Verstappen	All; 1–4; 5–21
(France) Renault Sport Formula One Team	Renault	R.S.16	Renault R.E.16	20; 30	(Denmark) Kevin Magnussen (United Kingdom) Jolyon Palmer	All; All
(Switzerland) Sauber F1 Team	Sauber-Ferrari	C35	Ferrari 061	9; 12	(Sweden) Marcus Ericsson (Brazil) Felipe Nasr	All; All
(Italy) Scuderia Toro Rosso	Toro Rosso-Ferrari	STR11	Ferrari 060	33; 26; 55	(Netherlands) Max Verstappen (Russia) Daniil Kvyat (Spain) Carlos Sainz Jr.	1–4; 5–21; All
(United Kingdom) Williams Martini Racing	Williams-Mercedes	FW38	Mercedes PU106C Hybrid	19; 77	(Brazil) Felipe Massa (Finland) Valtteri Bottas	All; All

=== Free practice drivers ===
Five drivers drove in free practice sessions in place of regular drivers.

Drivers that took part in free practice sessions
Constructor	Practice drivers		
Constructor	No.	Driver name	Rounds
Force India-Mercedes	34	(Mexico) Alfonso Celis Jr.	2, 4, 9, 14, 18, 21
Haas-Ferrari	50	(Monaco) Charles Leclerc	10–12, 20
Manor-Mercedes	42	(United Kingdom) Jordan King	18, 21
Renault	46; 45	(Russia) Sergey Sirotkin (France) Esteban Ocon	4, 20; 5, 10–12

=== Team changes ===
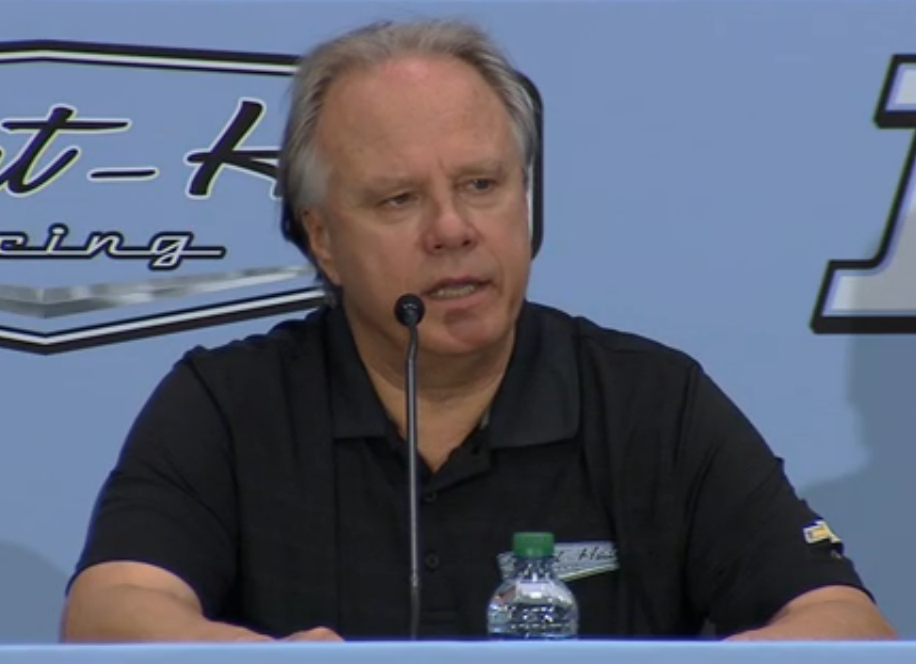

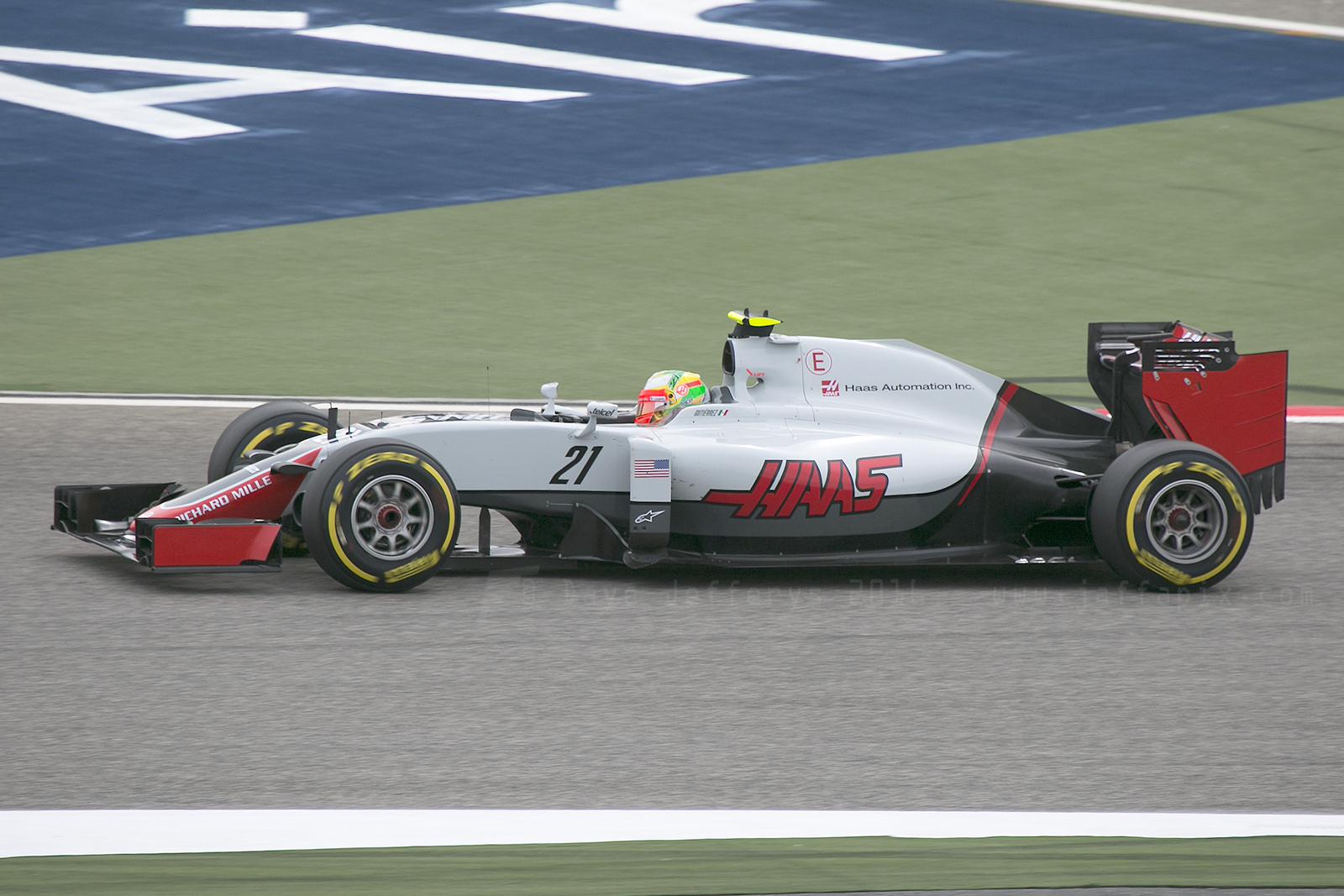
Gene Haas, founder of NASCAR team Stewart–Haas Racing (top), entered a new team in 2016 (VF-16 pictured bottom).

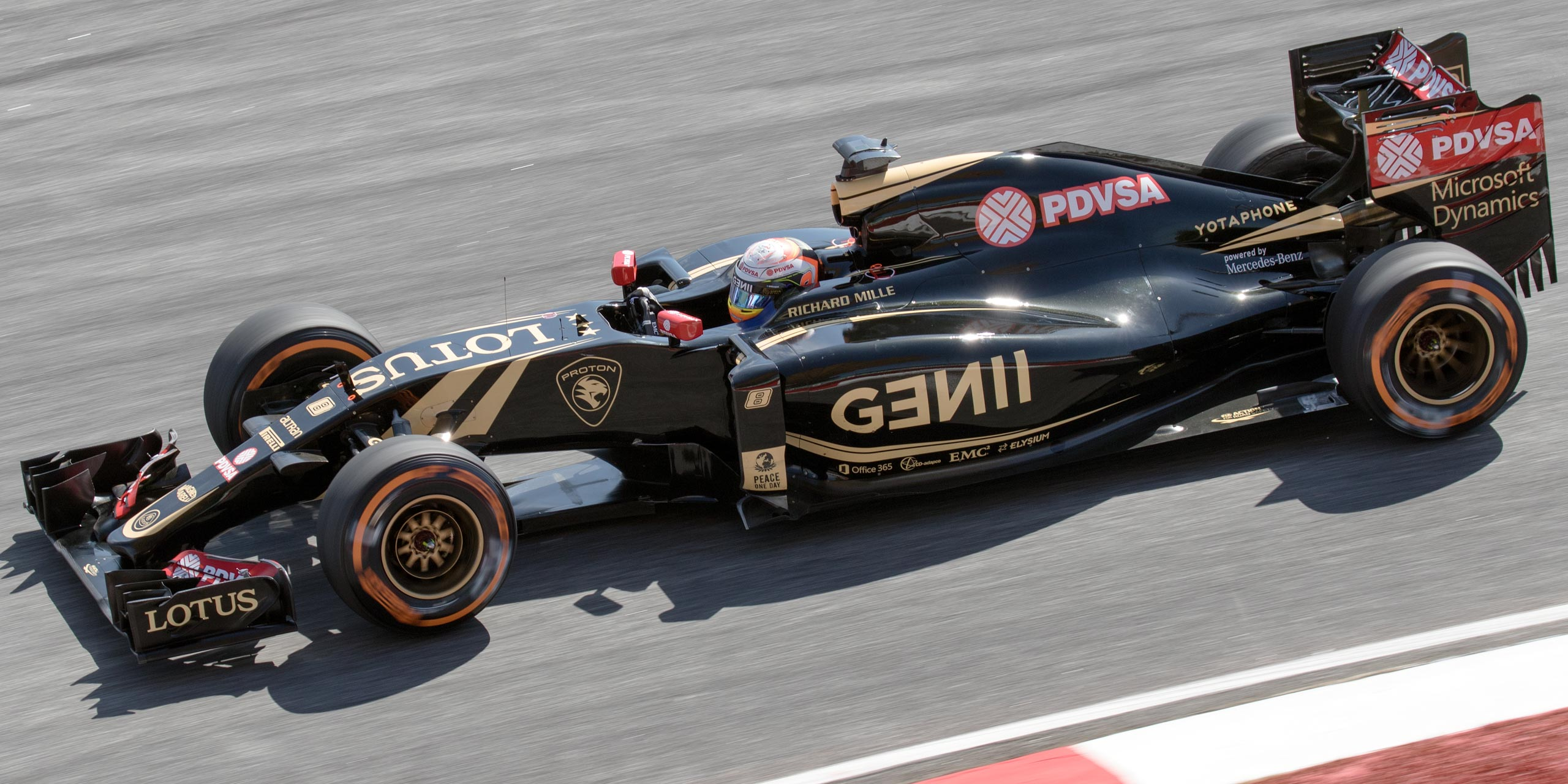

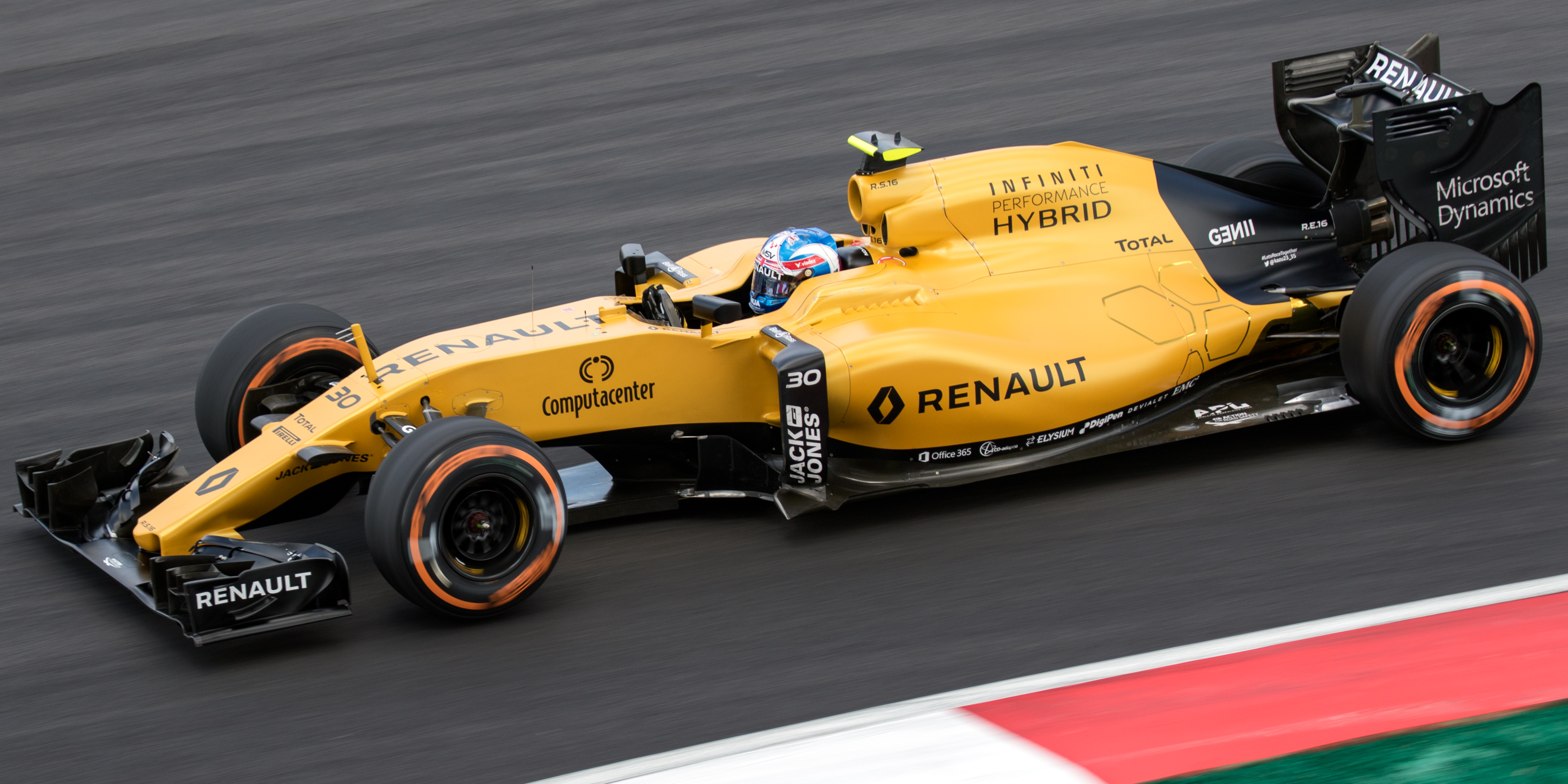
Lotus (E23 Hybrid pictured top) were purchased by Renault (R.S.16 pictured bottom).

Several team changes took place before the season began. Haas F1 Team, a team formed by NASCAR Sprint Cup Series team owner Gene Haas, joined the Formula One grid, becoming the first American team to compete since the unrelated Haas Lola team competed in 1986. (Note: An American-registered constructor known as US F1 was accepted to the grid in 2010, but the team collapsed before the start of that season.) The team used power units supplied by Ferrari and a chassis developed by Dallara. Dallara had last participated in Formula One as the chassis manufacturer for HRT in 2010. Renault returned to Formula One as a full factory-supported team after they purchased Lotus from Genii Capital, the venture capital firm they had originally sold the same team to in 2010, and supplied engines to up until the end of 2014. Lotus's participation in the 2016 season was in question pending the resolution of a High Court case brought against the team by HM Revenue and Customs over unpaid PAYE tax.

Both Red Bull Racing and Scuderia Toro Rosso underwent changes regarding their power unit supply. The former formally ended their nine-year partnership with engine supplier Renault at the end of the 2015 season, with the team citing the lack of performance from the Renault Energy-F1 2015 engine as a leading factor in the change. The team continued using Renault engines, but they were rebadged as TAG Heuer. Team principal Christian Horner named Renault's partnership with Mario Illien and his company Ilmor as a reason for staying with the manufacturer. Meanwhile, Scuderia Toro Rosso returned to using Ferrari power units, as they had done prior to the start of 2014, after Renault announced that they would no longer supply customer engines. The team used the type 060 power unit used by Ferrari teams in 2015 after Ferrari received approval from the World Motor Sport Council to supply year-old engines.

Marussia applied for their team name to be changed to Manor Racing, a request granted in January 2016. The team adopted the formal name of "Manor Racing MRT" and switched from Ferrari to Mercedes power, with the team upgrading to a 2016-specification engine after having used a year-old Ferrari engine in 2015. The team underwent a management reshuffle following the resignation of team principal John Booth and sporting director Graeme Lowdon.

Sauber underwent a change in ownership in the week prior to the Hungarian Grand Prix, with the team being purchased by Longbow Finance. Despite the acquisition and the retirement of team founder Peter Sauber, the team continued to use the Sauber identity.

=== Driver changes ===
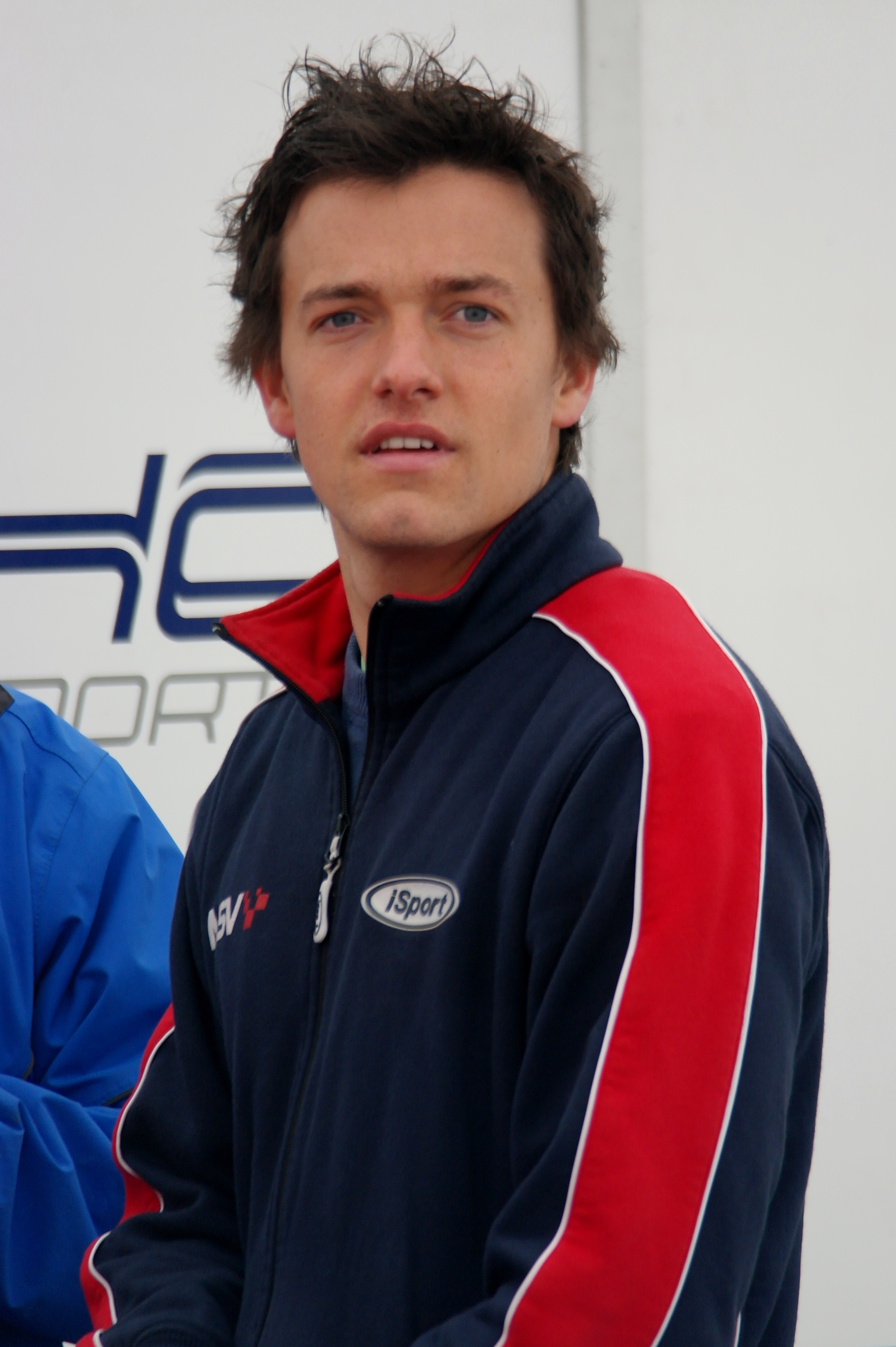
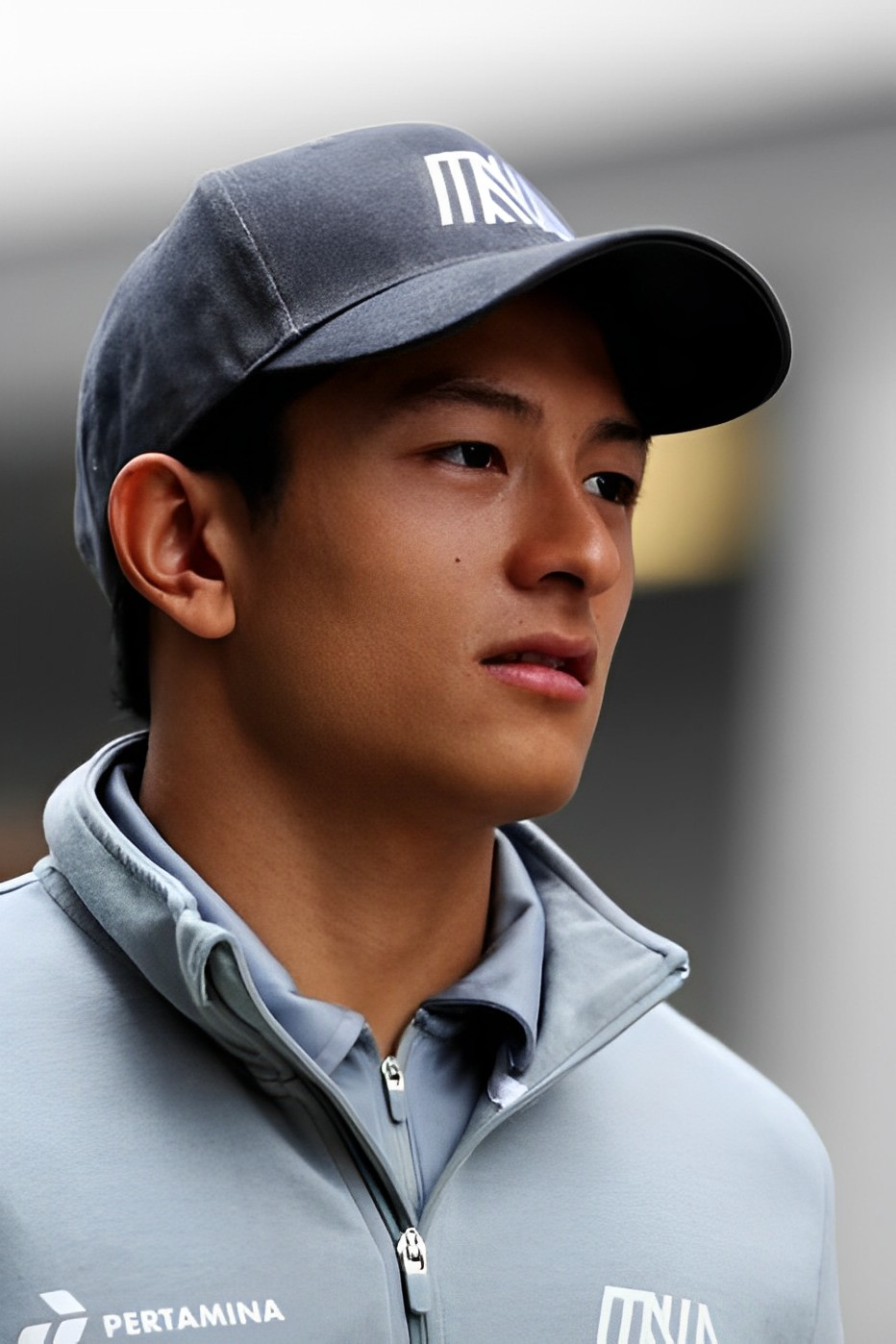
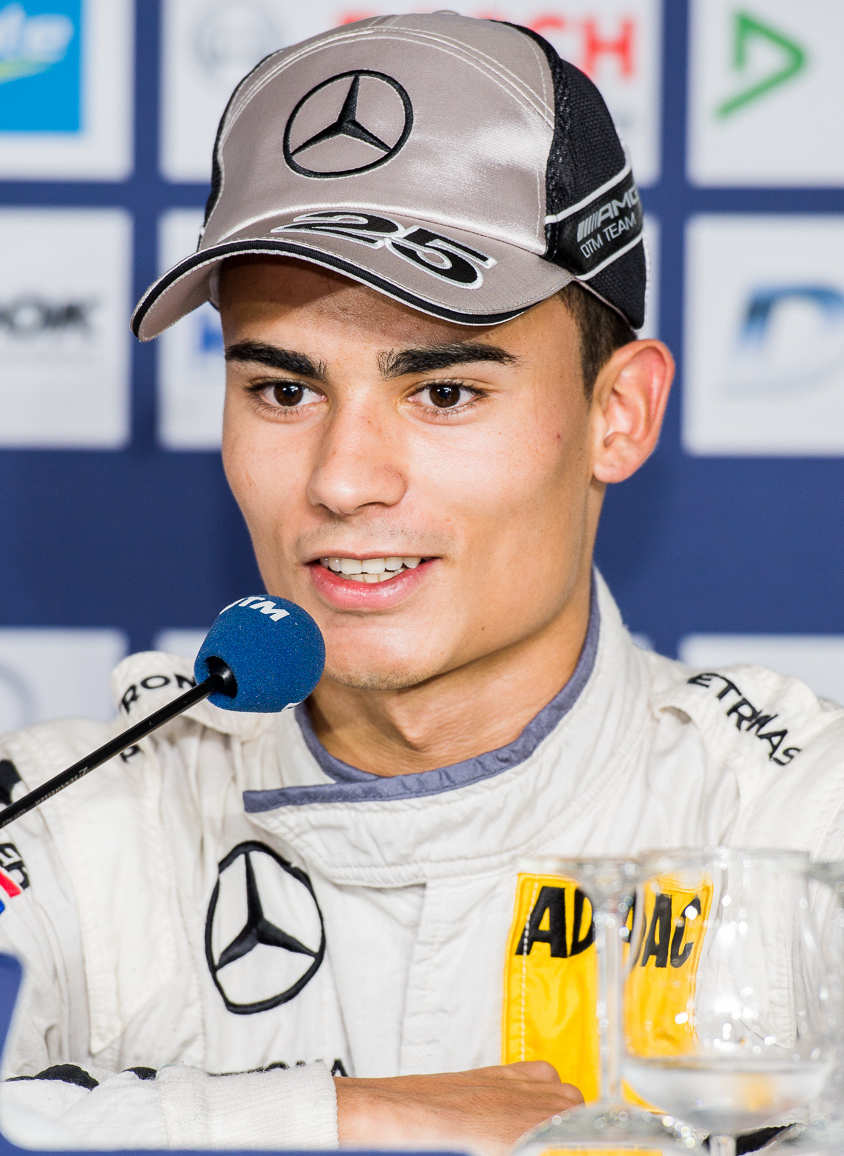
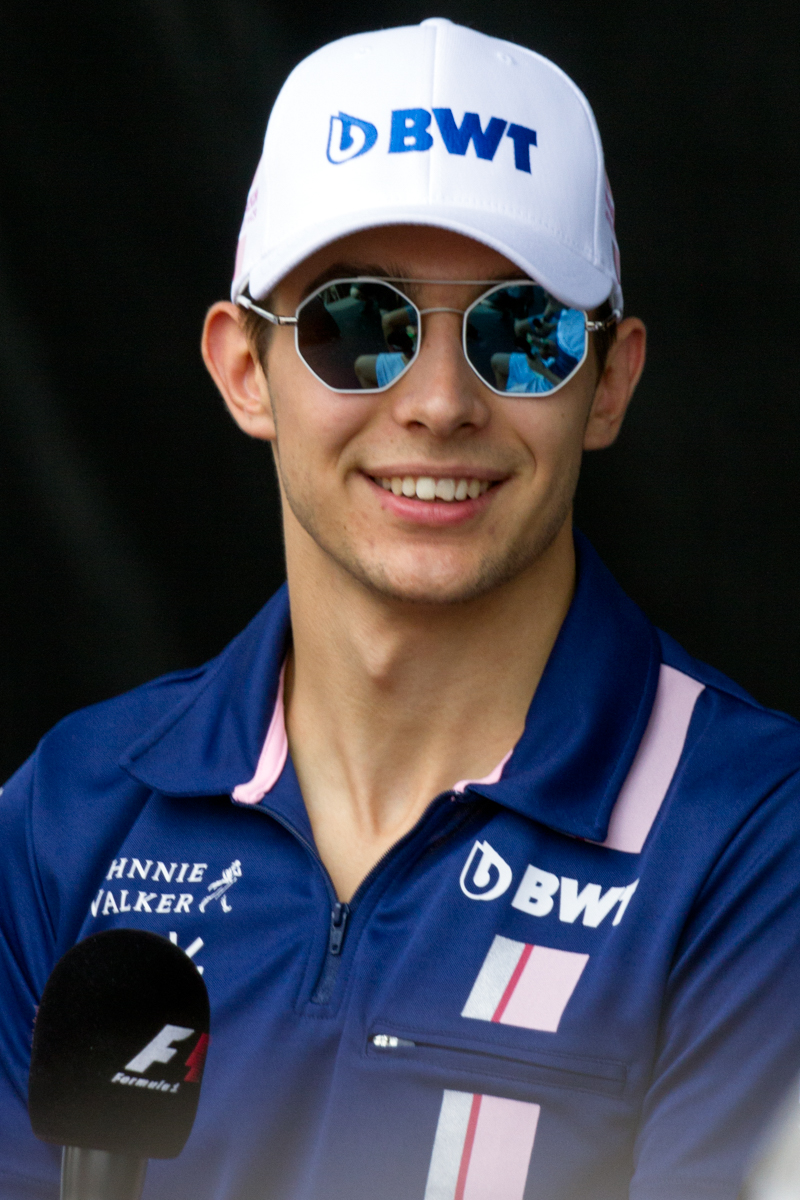
Jolyon Palmer, Rio Haryanto, Pascal Wehrlein, and Esteban Ocon made their Formula One debuts in 2016, Palmer with Renault, and the latter three with Manor. Haryanto was terminated after 12 round due to sponsor issues.

The driver line-ups saw a couple of changes prior to the 2016 season and three more while the season was underway. Romain Grosjean left Lotus at the end of the 2015 season. He signed with the newly formed Haas F1 Team for 2016, where he was joined by former Sauber driver Esteban Gutiérrez. Gutiérrez returned to competition after spending a season as Ferrari's test and reserve driver.

After having taken over the Lotus team, Renault introduced a new driver-line up. Jolyon Palmer, the 2014 GP2 Series champion, made his race debut in Melbourne. Palmer had previously made regular free practice appearances with the team when it was known as Lotus in 2015. Despite originally having signed a contract with Lotus for 2016, Pastor Maldonado announced he would not be driving for Renault after his sponsors were unable to fulfil their contractual obligations to the team. He was replaced by Kevin Magnussen, who was released by McLaren when they chose not to renew his contract after he entered a single race for the team in 2015.

Manor did not retain their 2015 drivers either, opting to sign two rookies for its 2016 campaign: reigning Deutsche Tourenwagen Masters champion Pascal Wehrlein and GP2 Series regular Rio Haryanto, who became the first and, as of 2026, only Indonesian driver to race in the championship. Will Stevens and Roberto Merhi—who drove for the team when it competed as Marussia—were not retained by the team. Both moved to the FIA World Endurance Championship with Manor Motorsport, (Note: Although the Manor Motorsport team shares a name with Manor Racing and was established by former Manor Racing personnel, the two teams are separate entities.) while Alexander Rossi, who also raced for the team in 2015, was moved to a test and reserve role while he joined the IndyCar Series.

=== Mid-season changes ===
After suffering broken ribs and a pneumothorax injury as a result of an accident during the Australian Grand Prix, Fernando Alonso was ruled out of the Bahrain Grand Prix as a precaution after medical exams. McLaren reserve driver and reigning GP2 Series champion Stoffel Vandoorne made his Formula One debut, replacing Alonso. Alonso returned to his seat for the Chinese Grand Prix two weeks later. Daniil Kvyat and Max Verstappen traded places ahead of the Spanish Grand Prix, with Verstappen promoted to Red Bull Racing and Kvyat returning to Scuderia Toro Rosso. Red Bull explained the decision to swap their drivers as being made to relieve pressure on Kvyat following criticism for his role in a first-lap accident in the Russian Grand Prix, and to ease ongoing tension between Verstappen and teammate Carlos Sainz Jr. at Toro Rosso. Rio Haryanto lost his race seat after the German Grand Prix, when his sponsors were unable to meet their financial obligations to the team. He stayed with the team, filling a testing and reserve role. His race seat was filled by 2015 GP3 Series champion and Renault test driver Esteban Ocon, who made his Formula One debut with MRT at the Belgian Grand Prix.

== Calendar ==
Nations that hosted a Grand Prix in 2016 are highlighted in green, with circuit locations marked with a black dot. Former host nations are shown in dark grey, and former host circuits are marked with a white dot.

The following twenty-one Grands Prix took place in 2016.

Round	Grand Prix	Circuit	Date
1	Australian Grand Prix	(Australia) Albert Park Circuit, Melbourne	20 March
2	Bahrain Grand Prix	Bahrain International Circuit, Sakhir	3 April
3	Chinese Grand Prix	(China) Shanghai International Circuit, Shanghai	17 April
4	Russian Grand Prix	(Russia) Sochi Autodrom, Sochi	1 May
5	Spanish Grand Prix	(Spain) Circuit de Barcelona-Catalunya, Montmeló	15 May
6	Monaco Grand Prix	Circuit de Monaco, Monte Carlo	29 May
7	Canadian Grand Prix	(Canada) Circuit Gilles Villeneuve, Montreal	12 June
8	European Grand Prix	(Azerbaijan) Baku City Circuit, Baku	19 June
9	Austrian Grand Prix	(Austria) Red Bull Ring, Spielberg	3 July
10	British Grand Prix	(United Kingdom) Silverstone Circuit, Silverstone	10 July
11	Hungarian Grand Prix	(Hungary) Hungaroring, Mogyoród	24 July
12	German Grand Prix	(Germany) Hockenheimring, Hockenheim	31 July
13	Belgian Grand Prix	(Belgium) Circuit de Spa-Francorchamps, Stavelot	28 August
14	Italian Grand Prix	(Italy) Autodromo Nazionale di Monza, Monza	4 September
15	Singapore Grand Prix	Marina Bay Street Circuit, Singapore	18 September
16	Malaysian Grand Prix	(Malaysia) Sepang International Circuit, Kuala Lumpur	2 October
17	Japanese Grand Prix	(Japan) Suzuka International Racing Course, Suzuka	9 October
18	United States Grand Prix	(United States) Circuit of the Americas, Austin, Texas	23 October
19	Mexican Grand Prix	Autódromo Hermanos Rodríguez, Mexico City	30 October
20	Brazilian Grand Prix	(Brazil) Autódromo José Carlos Pace, São Paulo	13 November
21	Abu Dhabi Grand Prix	(United Arab Emirates) Yas Marina Circuit, Abu Dhabi	27 November

=== Calendar changes ===
Formula One visited Azerbaijan for the first time in 2016 for the revival of the European Grand Prix. The race was run on a street circuit in the capital, Baku.

There were a few revisions to the calendar from the previous season. The European Grand Prix returned to the calendar after a three-year absence. The race was moved from its previous home in Valencia to a brand-new street circuit in Baku, the capital of Azerbaijan. It was the first Grand Prix held in Azerbaijan. The German Grand Prix returned to the calendar as well, taking place at the Hockenheimring. The event had been cancelled in 2015 when a venue could not be secured. The circuit had previously hosted the race in 2014 as part of their agreement with the Nürburgring to alternate between venues, with the Hockenheimring hosting the race every even-numbered year.

Three races were contracted for 2016 but did not feature on the calendar. The Grand Prix of America was set to be held for the first time at the Port Imperial Street Circuit in New Jersey, in accordance with a fifteen-year contract. The race was originally scheduled to debut in 2013, but was delayed for the fourth consecutive year. The Indian Grand Prix was removed from the calendar after the 2013 race, following a dispute over taxation. After several failed attempts at reviving the race in 2014 and 2015, the event's return was deferred until the 2016 season; however, it was once again left off the final calendar for the season. In 2006, Formula One Management had signed a seven-year contract to run the Korean Grand Prix at the Korea International Circuit beginning in 2010. However, the event was discontinued in 2014, and was omitted from the calendar for the third consecutive season in 2016.

== Rule changes ==
=== General changes ===
The FIA and Formula One Management were granted greater power to change the Sporting and Technical regulations and to make decisions affecting the governance of the sport. From the Monaco race weekend onwards, the FIA allowed drivers to choose alternative helmet designs for one race weekend per season, a practice previously prohibited as drivers were required to wear the same design to make them more recognisable to spectators and television audiences.

=== Technical ===
Cars were required to be designed with a separate wastegate for exhaust gases to pass through in a bid to increase the noise of the cars following criticism since the introduction of the 2014 generation of engines. The FIA also opted to increase the number of tokens available for power unit development starting in 2016. While the initial plans would have given manufacturers fifteen tokens for the season, the number was raised to thirty-two, the same number as 2014, in order to allow struggling manufacturers such as Renault and Honda to improve their development. This decision also allowed further development on parts that were initially planned to be closed off, including the upper and lower crankcase, valve drive, crankshaft, air-valve system and ancillaries drive.

=== Sporting regulations ===
==== Schedule ====
Starting in 2016, the number of pre-season tests were reduced from three to two. The FIA formally increased the maximum events allowed in a season from 20 to 21 to accommodate the calendar's approval.

==== Tyres ====
Tyre supplier Pirelli introduced a fifth dry tyre compound known as "ultrasoft", with the manufacturer stating that they would only be available on street circuits. Pirelli further changed their approach to tyre supply in 2016, bringing three dry compounds to races instead of two. The compounds are made public two weeks before each event. Pirelli assigns two "choice" compounds, and a third set (the softest available regardless of Pirelli's selection) are given to teams reaching Q3. Drivers select their remaining ten tyre sets for the event between the three compounds and must use two dry compounds during the race.

==== Penalties ====
The stewards were given greater powers in enforcing track limits, with drivers required to stay between the white lines marking the edges of the circuit, except in cases of driver error. Any driver who caused the start of a race to be aborted would have been required to start the race from pit lane at the restart. The procedure for issuing gearbox penalties was amended as well, so that penalties were applied in the order that they were awarded, bringing the system in line with the wider grid penalty system.

==== Safety improvements ====
The usage of the Virtual Safety Car system was expanded to practice sessions as well to avoid the unnecessary use of red flags and session stoppages. The rules governing the use of the drag reduction system, which is deactivated when under Virtual Safety Car periods and full-course yellow flags, were also amended. Drivers were now allowed to make use of the device as soon as a Virtual Safety Car period has ended; while they previously had to wait two laps before the system was reactivated.

==== Qualifying ====
The qualifying process was heavily revised two weeks before the season began. The three-period format first introduced in 2006 was retained, but with a progressive "knock-out" style of elimination. However, following widespread criticism of the format at the opening rounds, the format was abandoned after two races, and the system used between 2006 and 2015 re-introduced at the Chinese Grand Prix.

==== Other ====
The stewards' powers to monitor pit-to-car communications were broadened for the 2016 season, with race control able to monitor the radio feeds for each driver in real time and consult with engineering advisors to further monitor the content in a bid to crack down on driver coaching and the use of coded messages. Following a series of controversial penalties at the British and Hungarian Grands Prix and extended debate over the application of the rules, however, the FIA relaxed the restrictions on radio-communication which were introduced at the start of the season; starting with the German Grand Prix, applying them to the formation lap only.

The process new drivers go through in order to qualify for a superlicence was changed as well, with additional restrictions—including the requirement that drivers complete eighty percent of two seasons from a series outside a recognised points-paying championship—put in place as part of the wider FIA Global Pathway. The new points system was retroactively applied, with all results for all eligible drivers automatically qualifying for superlicence points. The changes were introduced following the controversy which surrounded Max Verstappen qualifying for a superlicence at the age of sixteen after a single season competing in European Formula 3.

== Season report ==
=== Pre-season ===
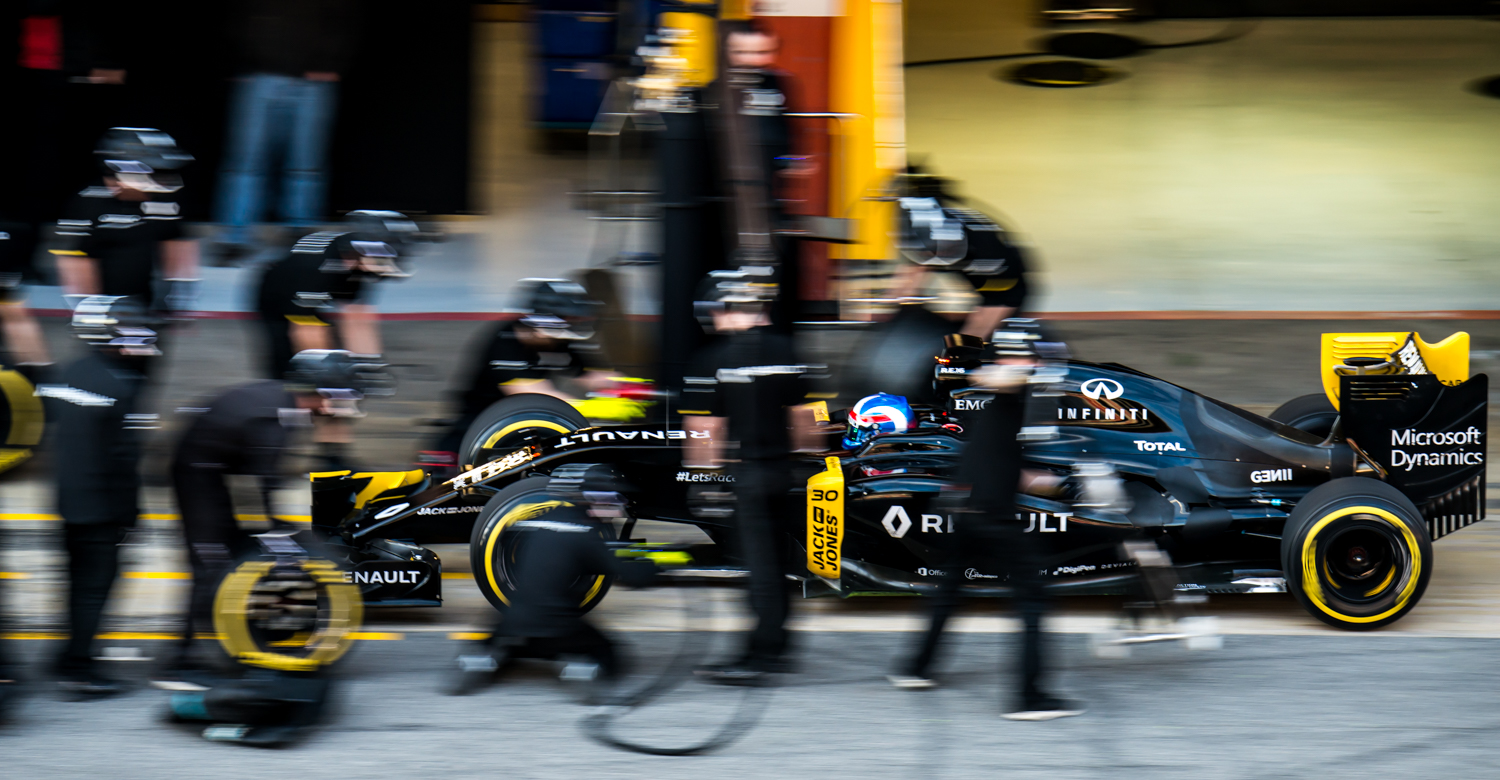
Jolyon Palmer performing a practice pit stop in his Renault R.S.16. The black testing livery was later replaced.

For the second year in a row, Hamilton decided not to exercise his option of switching his car number to 1, as was his prerogative as reigning World Champion, and would instead race with his career number 44. A pre-season tyre test was held at Circuit Paul Ricard in France in January, conducted by Pirelli to evaluate their wet weather tyres. The first pre-season team test was held a month later at the Circuit de Catalunya. Ferrari were fastest on three of the four testing days, with Nico Hülkenberg topping the time sheets for Force India on the third day. A second test, also in Barcelona, was conducted on 1–4 March. Ferrari ended the two tests with the best time set overall on the newly introduced ultra-soft tyres, while Mercedes covered the most distance in testing, almost 5,000 km (3,100 mi). The second four days of testing also saw the teams examine a proposed feature for driver head protection, dubbed the "halo".

=== Opening rounds ===
The season started with the Australian Grand Prix, and featured the newly introduced elimination-style qualifying format. This format was heavily criticized by teams, drivers, fans and the press, which led to a review of the format before the next race. The race ended with a 1–2 finish for Mercedes with Nico Rosberg taking victory from Lewis Hamilton in second. Sebastian Vettel and Ferrari finished on the last remaining step of the podium. Teammate Kimi Räikkönen retired with a suspected turbo failure on lap 21. On lap 16, whilst attempting to overtake Esteban Gutiérrez in the new Haas F1 car at turn three, Fernando Alonso crashed at high speed into the outside barrier before barrel-rolling and landing upside-down against the barrier. Gutiérrez ended up in the gravel trap with terminal rear tyre damage, and quickly went over to Alonso who managed to exit his cockpit unaided. Due to the huge amount of debris caused by the accident the race was red flagged, with the cars subsequently lining up in the pitlane. Romain Grosjean finished sixth in the other Haas and they became the first brand new team to score points in their inaugural race since Toyota did so in 2002.

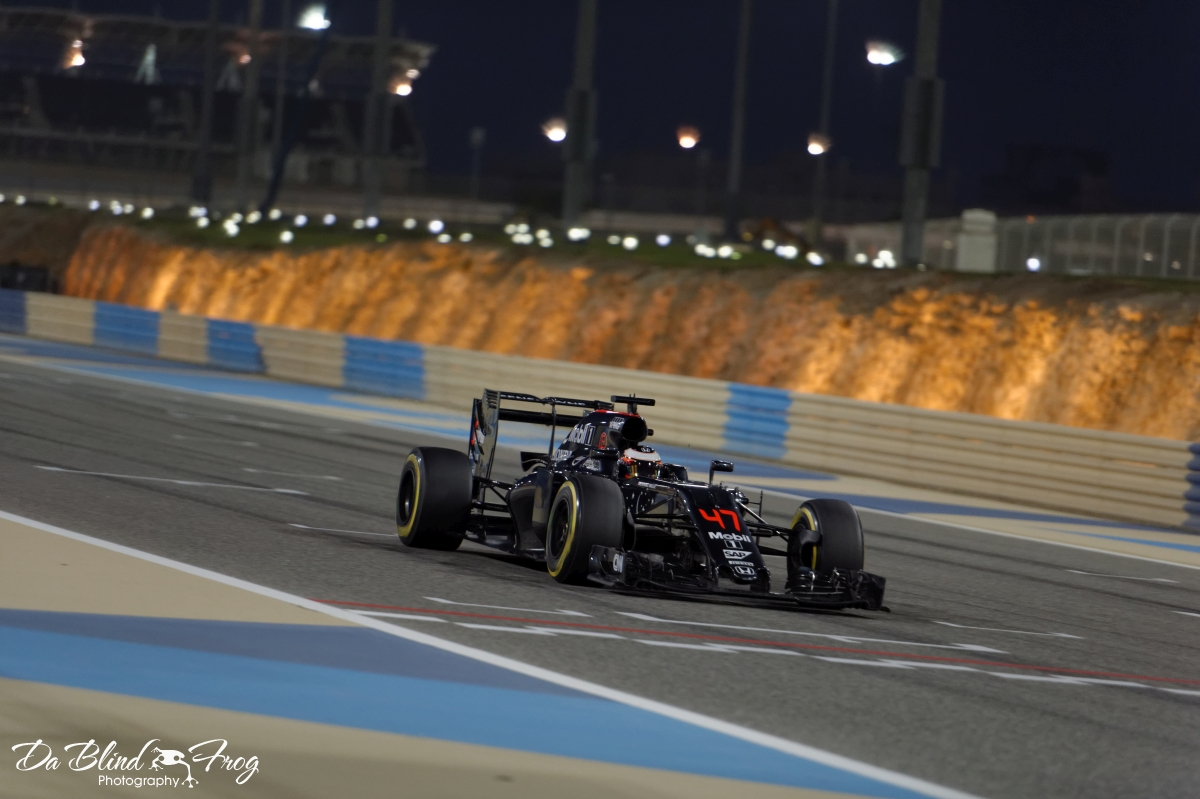
Stoffel Vandoorne made his debut in the Bahrain Grand Prix, scoring his first Formula One career point for McLaren.

At the next race in Bahrain, Alonso was ruled out of taking part on medical grounds and was later revealed to have suffered broken ribs and a pneumothorax as a result of the previous race's collision, and was replaced by rookie Stoffel Vandoorne. Following the widespread criticism of the new qualifying format, the teams voted to abandon it and revert to the system used in 2015. However, in the week before the race weekend, the sport's Strategy Working Group over-ruled the teams in order to keep the elimination style for 2016. After qualifying, the system once again came under heavy fire with Hamilton securing pole position ahead of Rosberg and Vettel. The race saw Rosberg take his second consecutive victory of 2016 followed by Räikkönen and Hamilton, respectively. The Ferrari of Sebastian Vettel and the Renault of Jolyon Palmer retired before the race started with engine and hydraulics failures, respectively. Following a first-lap collision with Hamilton, Valtteri Bottas was penalised and given two points on his licence.

At the next Grand Prix in China, the elimination style qualifying format was permanently dropped in favour of the previous format used between 2006 and 2015. This yielded Nico Rosberg's first pole position of the year after Hamilton suffered a number of setbacks both in qualifying and during the race itself, eventually finishing in seventh place, with his teammate taking his third consecutive victory of the 2016 season. The race finished with no retirements, a feat that has only been achieved six times. The next race in Russia featured a number of incidents on the first lap with Vettel and Kvyat getting involved. Kvyat hit Vettel twice forcing him to retire. Rosberg won the race with his teammate Lewis Hamilton finishing second after starting 10th and Rosberg achieved his first grand slam and extended his championship lead going into the European races.

=== European rounds ===
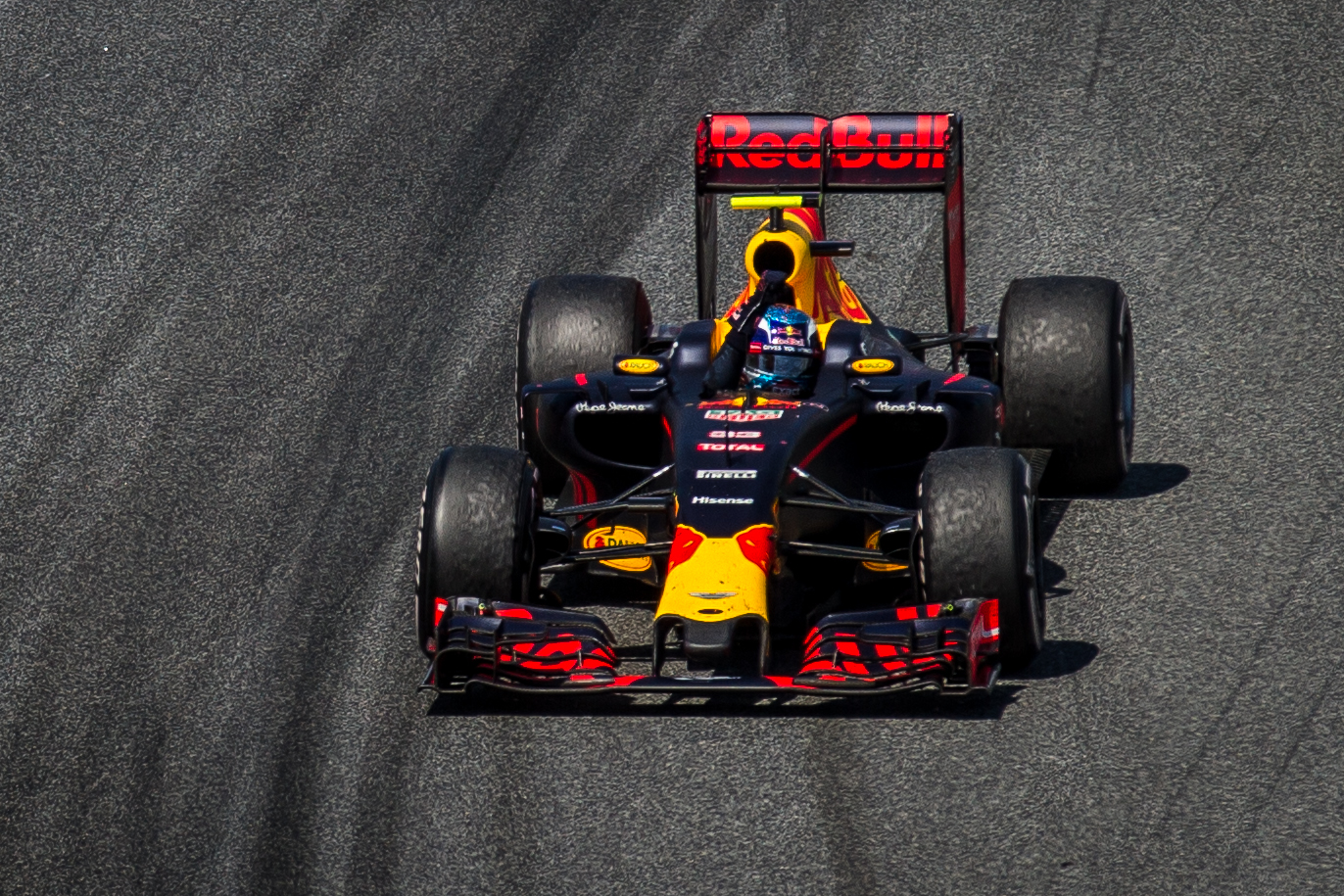
Max Verstappen became the youngest ever winner in Formula One when he won the Spanish Grand Prix.

Before the race in Spain, Daniil Kvyat and Max Verstappen swapped places with Kvyat going to Toro Rosso and Verstappen to Red Bull. The start of the race saw Hamilton and Rosberg collide, handing the lead to Daniel Ricciardo. The race also saw the youngest race winner as Max Verstappen won the Grand Prix, defending against Kimi Räikkönen after Red Bull committed Ricciardo to an additional pit stop.

At the next round in Monaco, Ricciardo took the first pole position of his career. Helped by the race starting behind the safety car he held the lead for 33 laps, but was unable to convert it to a win after his team made a costly error during his pit-stop. As a result, Lewis Hamilton inherited the lead and went on to win the race, his first of the season. Ricciardo finished second ahead of Sergio Pérez. Hamilton then went on to win the Canadian Grand Prix despite losing the lead to Sebastian Vettel at the start, reclaiming the position with a one-stop strategy while Vettel and Ferrari committed to two stops. Valtteri Bottas finished third, his first podium of the season. Rosberg won the returning European Grand Prix with his second grand slam of the season and of his career, ahead of Sebastian Vettel and Sergio Pérez, while Hamilton finished fifth after struggling with a software issue that limited his engine's ability to harvest energy.

Hamilton took pole position at the next round in Austria while Rosberg started sixth after a grid penalty. The two drivers followed opposing strategies to be first and second after the pit stops, with Hamilton on the preferred racing tyre gradually catching Rosberg. The two made contact as Hamilton tried to pass Rosberg on the final lap; Hamilton won the race, while Rosberg broke his front wing and finished fourth behind Verstappen and Räikkönen. A stewards' inquiry found that Rosberg had caused an avoidable collision, and handed him a ten-second penalty, though the race result was not affected. Hamilton reduced the deficit to Rosberg to a single point at the next round in Great Britain, where difficult conditions saw the drivers contend with a drying circuit and varying grip levels. Hamilton established an early lead, while Rosberg and Verstappen fought over second place. Rosberg prevailed, but suffered a critical fault with his gearbox late in the race. Mercedes instructed him to reset the gearbox and to avoid using seventh gear or else risk a catastrophic failure, which prompted an investigation by the stewards for providing him with assistance. Rosberg was ultimately penalised for the radio call, having ten seconds added to his race time, which demoted him to third behind Verstappen.

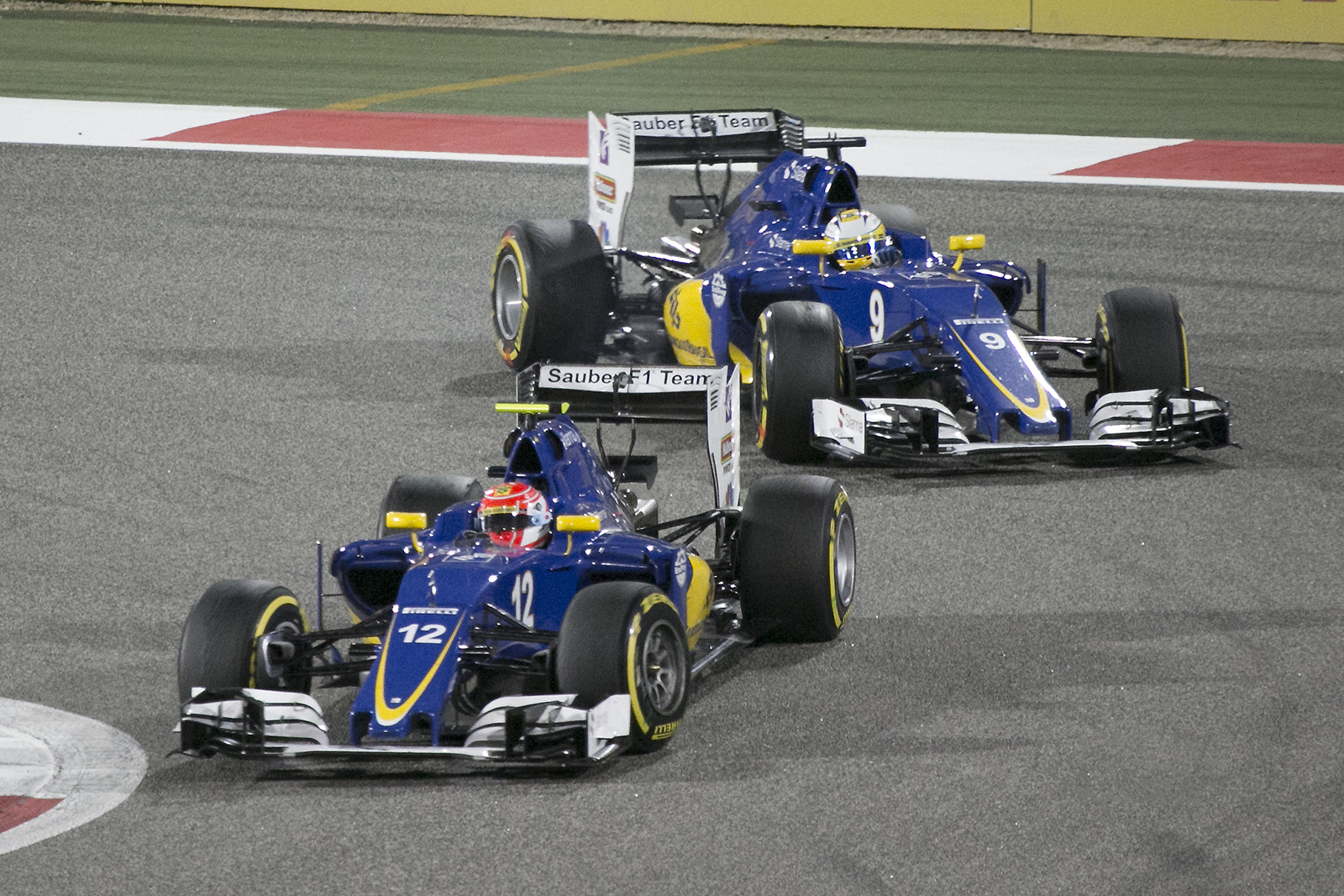
Following the Austrian Grand Prix, Sauber was the last remaining team that had not scored a single point in the 2016 Formula One World Championship.

Lewis Hamilton took the championship lead from Nico Rosberg at the next round in Hungary, leading another Mercedes 1–2 finish to gain a six-point lead in the Drivers' Championship standings. The Grand Prix was marked by controversy: Rosberg secured pole position on a drying circuit in qualifying after McLaren's Fernando Alonso spun in front of him necessitating a double waved yellow flag. Although race stewards confirmed that Rosberg had slowed, he nevertheless secured pole with his lap time. The race saw Jenson Button fall afoul of new restrictions on pit-to-car communications that demanded that any car with an issue serious enough to require the intervention of the team be pitted or retired. Button reported a brake issue—which was later revealed to be a faulty sensor—and was penalised for unauthorised assistance.

Following penalties for Rosberg and Button for unauthorised pit-to-car communications in the previous races, the FIA repealed all regulations for the next round in Germany. Hamilton further consolidated his championship lead, beating Rosberg off the line at the start; for his part, Rosberg was caught by the Red Bulls of Daniel Ricciardo and Max Verstappen and was unable to pass them. Rosberg's race was further complicated by a time penalty for an aggressive pass on Verstappen that forced the Red Bull driver wide. However, Hamilton remained pessimistic about his position as championship leader, as with nine races left in the season, he was anticipating grid penalties for exceeding his engine allocation.

With Mercedes opting to take a series of grid penalties to build up a stockpile of components, Hamilton was forced to start the next race in Belgium from the back of the grid. He took advantage of first-lap contact between Vettel, Räikkönen and Verstappen to work his way through the field before a heavy accident involving Kevin Magnussen at Eau Rouge forced the race to be temporarily stopped. When the race resumed, Nico Rosberg led the race until the chequered flag, while Hamilton ultimately finished third after being unable to catch Daniel Ricciardo. Further down the order, Verstappen was subject to increasing criticism over his driving tactics after being caught in several incidents with Räikkönen and Sergio Pérez, while Esteban Ocon finished sixteenth on debut for MRT.

Rosberg reduced Hamilton's championship lead to two points at the next round in Italy, taking advantage of a slow start by Hamilton to establish an early lead that went unchallenged through the race. Hamilton dropped as low as fifth at the start, recovering to fourth in the opening laps and got ahead of the Ferraris of Vettel and Räikkönen by making one pit-stop less. Vettel went on to finish third—his first podium finish in five races—with Räikkönen fourth as the team introduced upgrades to the type 061 power unit in the hopes of recovering second place in the World Constructors' Championship from Red Bull.

=== Return to Asia ===
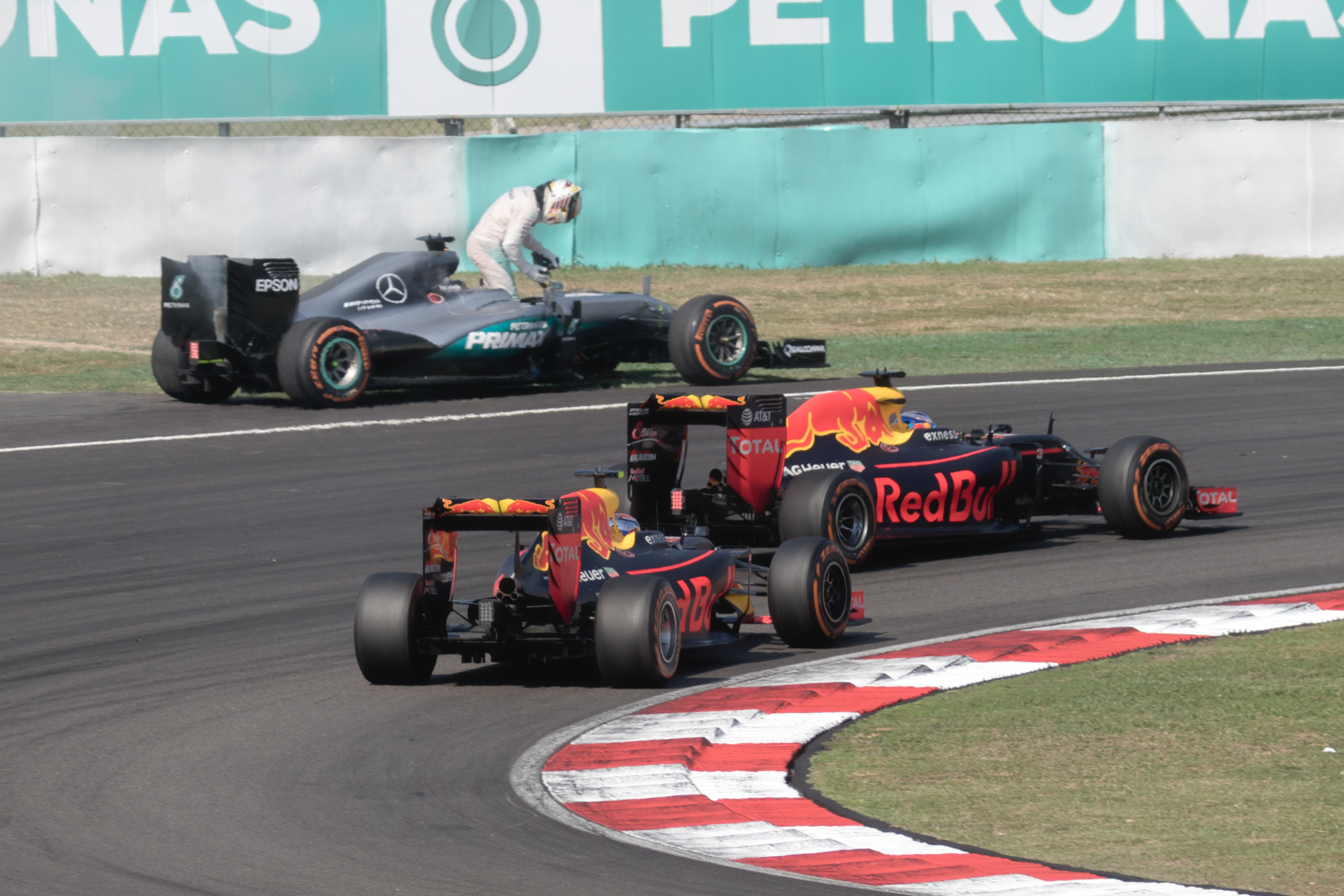
Lewis Hamilton's engine failure in Malaysia was a key moment in the Drivers' Championship fight.

Rosberg reclaimed the championship lead in Singapore, qualifying on pole while Hamilton was forced to settle for third after struggling with mechanical issues and driving errors. A late pit stop during the race by Mercedes saw Hamilton pass Kimi Räikkönen for third which he held until the end of the race. Red Bull Racing decided to pit Daniel Ricciardo from second to prevent coming under threat from Hamilton. Rosberg decided to stay out because his lead over Ricciardo was not large enough to pit and stay ahead, but was able to hold on to first place to take the win. Ricciardo made late efforts to catch Rosberg from 27 seconds behind, but could not quite catch him, finishing 0.6 seconds behind at the chequered flag. With Hamilton finishing third, Rosberg turned a two-point deficit into an eight-point lead.

Mercedes's streak of ten consecutive wins came to an end in Malaysia. Hamilton established an early lead, but retired sixteen laps from the end of the race when his engine failed, leaving Daniel Ricciardo in control of the race. Nico Rosberg was turned around by Sebastian Vettel in a first corner accident that eliminated Vettel and forced Rosberg to work his way up through the field. Ricciardo raced Max Verstappen for the lead when Hamilton's retirement triggered a Virtual Safety Car, prompting Red Bull to pit both drivers at the same time. On fresher tyres, Ricciardo was able to withstand pressure from Verstappen to win his first race since the 2014 Belgian Grand Prix. Nico Rosberg finished third despite having ten seconds added to his race time for contact with Kimi Räikkönen, extending his championship lead to twenty-three points.

Rosberg further extended his championship lead to thirty-three points in Japan, starting the race from pole and winning it. Meanwhile, Hamilton suffered a poor start, slipping from second on the grid to eighth by the end of the first lap. He was forced to run a race of recovery, using pit strategy to reclaim third place going into the final phase of the race, but was unable to pass Max Verstappen, and finished third. The result secured Mercedes's third consecutive World Constructors' Championship title.

=== Championship conclusion ===
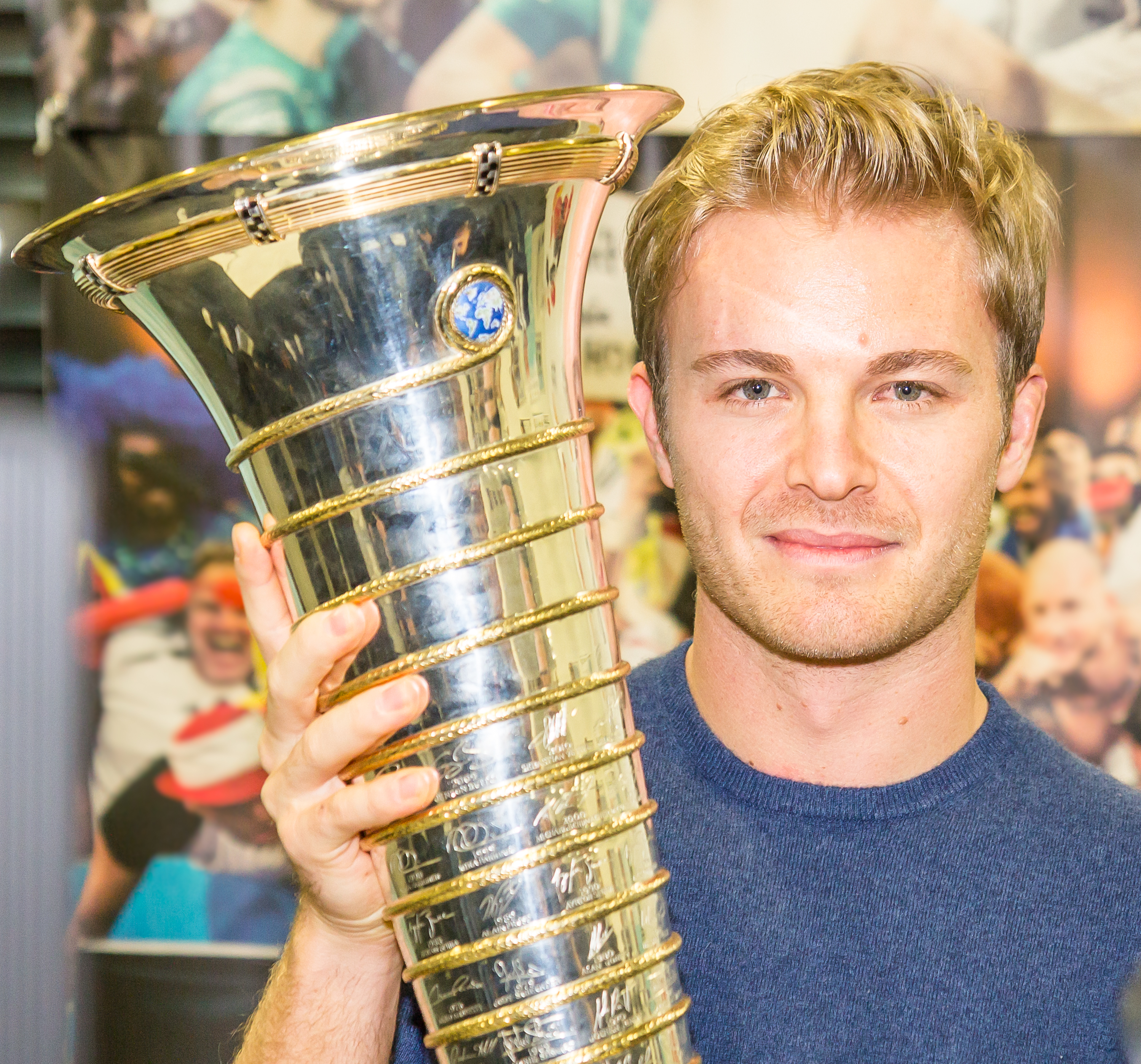
Nico Rosberg became the first reigning champion to retire from Formula One since Alain Prost in 1993.

With the championship leaving Asia for the Americas, Hamilton gradually started to erode Rosberg's championship lead. Mercedes scored a 1–2 finish in the United States, with Rosberg taking advantage of a Virtual Safety Car triggered by Max Verstappen to take second place from Daniel Ricciardo. Hamilton led another Mercedes 1–2 in Mexico, with the race overshadowed by a late incident that saw Verstappen run wide and cut part of the circuit, triggering an angry radio message from Sebastian Vettel. Vettel inherited third place when Verstappen was penalised, only to be penalised himself for dangerous driving when defending against Ricciardo. The final amended results saw Ricciardo finish third, ahead of Verstappen and Vettel. Treacherous weather conditions saw the Brazilian Grand Prix subject to several race stoppages—most notably after Kimi Räikkönen crashed on the main straight—but when racing resumed, Mercedes took another 1–2 finish. Hamilton won the race ahead of Rosberg for the third time in as many races, with Max Verstappen completing the podium.

Going into the final round at Abu Dhabi, Rosberg led Hamilton by twelve points. That meant that if Hamilton won the race, Rosberg needed to finish third to win the championship. Hamilton secured pole ahead of Rosberg and led from the start. In the closing laps of the race, he slowed down in attempt to allow other drivers to catch and pass Rosberg, despite repeated instructions from Mercedes not to risk losing the race to Sebastian Vettel, who used pit strategy to bring himself into contention and was quickly catching up. Hamilton went on to win the race, while Rosberg secured his maiden Drivers' Championship title with second place.

Five days after winning the title, Rosberg announced his immediate retirement from the sport at the FIA Prize Giving Ceremony in Vienna. He was the first reigning champion to do so since Alain Prost in 1993.

== Results and standings ==
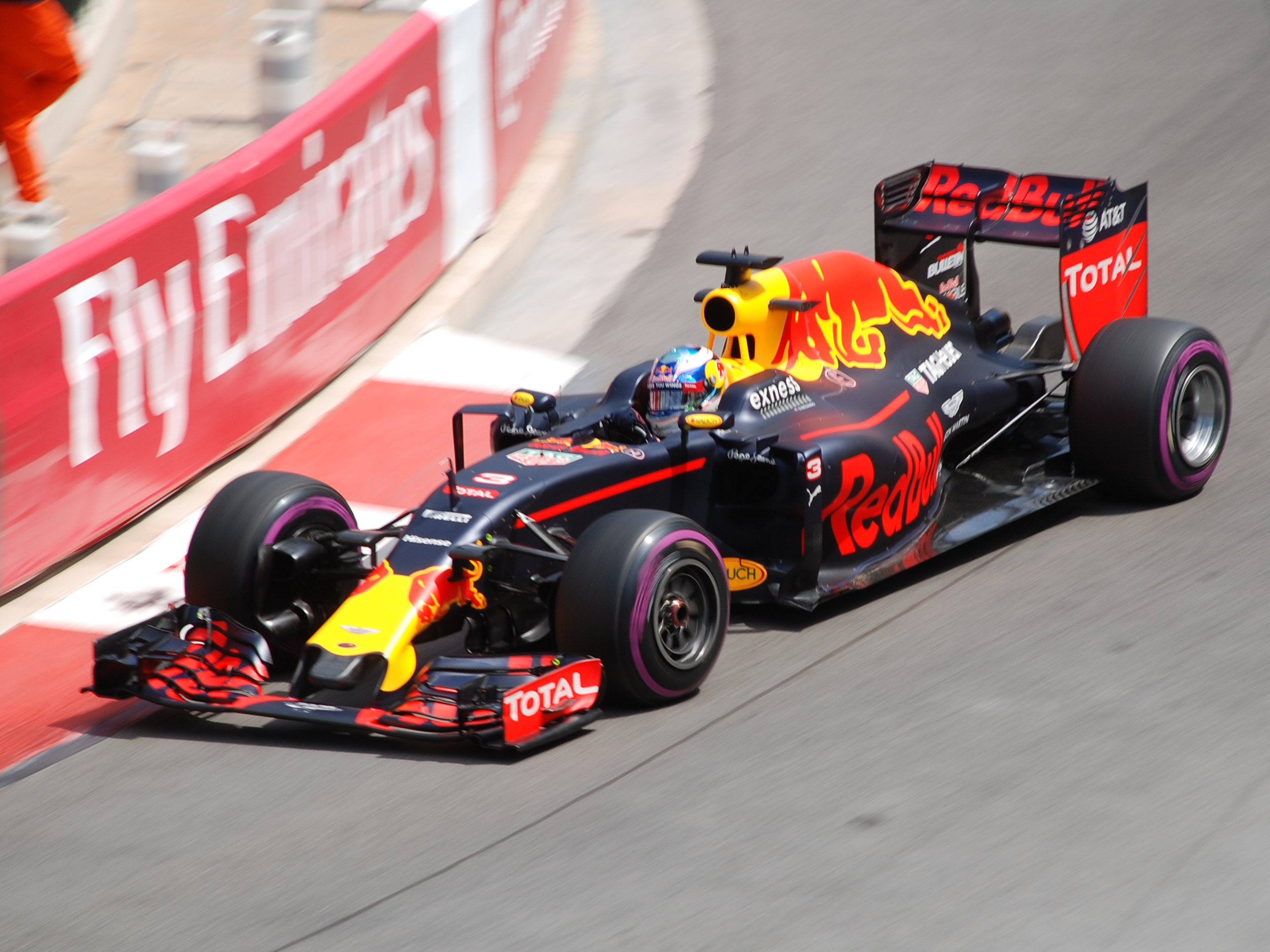
Daniel Ricciardo took the first pole position of his career in Monaco.

=== Grands Prix ===
Round	Grand Prix	Pole position	Fastest lap	Winning driver	Winning constructor	Report
1	(Australia) Australian Grand Prix	(United Kingdom) Lewis Hamilton	(Australia) Daniel Ricciardo	(Germany) Nico Rosberg	(Germany) Mercedes	Report
2	Bahrain Grand Prix	(United Kingdom) Lewis Hamilton	(Germany) Nico Rosberg	(Germany) Nico Rosberg	(Germany) Mercedes	Report
3	(China) Chinese Grand Prix	(Germany) Nico Rosberg	(Germany) Nico Hülkenberg	(Germany) Nico Rosberg	(Germany) Mercedes	Report
4	(Russia) Russian Grand Prix	(Germany) Nico Rosberg	(Germany) Nico Rosberg	(Germany) Nico Rosberg	(Germany) Mercedes	Report
5	(Spain) Spanish Grand Prix	(United Kingdom) Lewis Hamilton	(Russia) Daniil Kvyat	(Netherlands) Max Verstappen	(Austria) Red Bull Racing-TAG Heuer	Report
6	Monaco Grand Prix	(Australia) Daniel Ricciardo	(United Kingdom) Lewis Hamilton	(United Kingdom) Lewis Hamilton	(Germany) Mercedes	Report
7	(Canada) Canadian Grand Prix	(United Kingdom) Lewis Hamilton	(Germany) Nico Rosberg	(United Kingdom) Lewis Hamilton	(Germany) Mercedes	Report
8	(Azerbaijan) European Grand Prix	(Germany) Nico Rosberg	(Germany) Nico Rosberg	(Germany) Nico Rosberg	(Germany) Mercedes	Report
9	(Austria) Austrian Grand Prix	(United Kingdom) Lewis Hamilton	(United Kingdom) Lewis Hamilton	(United Kingdom) Lewis Hamilton	(Germany) Mercedes	Report
10	(United Kingdom) British Grand Prix	(United Kingdom) Lewis Hamilton	(Germany) Nico Rosberg	(United Kingdom) Lewis Hamilton	(Germany) Mercedes	Report
11	(Hungary) Hungarian Grand Prix	(Germany) Nico Rosberg	(Finland) Kimi Räikkönen	(United Kingdom) Lewis Hamilton	(Germany) Mercedes	Report
12	(Germany) German Grand Prix	(Germany) Nico Rosberg	(Australia) Daniel Ricciardo	(United Kingdom) Lewis Hamilton	(Germany) Mercedes	Report
13	(Belgium) Belgian Grand Prix	(Germany) Nico Rosberg	(United Kingdom) Lewis Hamilton	(Germany) Nico Rosberg	(Germany) Mercedes	Report
14	(Italy) Italian Grand Prix	(United Kingdom) Lewis Hamilton	(Spain) Fernando Alonso	(Germany) Nico Rosberg	(Germany) Mercedes	Report
15	Singapore Grand Prix	(Germany) Nico Rosberg	(Australia) Daniel Ricciardo	(Germany) Nico Rosberg	(Germany) Mercedes	Report
16	(Malaysia) Malaysian Grand Prix	(United Kingdom) Lewis Hamilton	(Germany) Nico Rosberg	(Australia) Daniel Ricciardo	(Austria) Red Bull Racing-TAG Heuer	Report
17	(Japan) Japanese Grand Prix	(Germany) Nico Rosberg	(Germany) Sebastian Vettel	(Germany) Nico Rosberg	(Germany) Mercedes	Report
18	United States Grand Prix	(United Kingdom) Lewis Hamilton	(Germany) Sebastian Vettel	(United Kingdom) Lewis Hamilton	(Germany) Mercedes	Report
19	(Mexico) Mexican Grand Prix	(United Kingdom) Lewis Hamilton	(Australia) Daniel Ricciardo	(United Kingdom) Lewis Hamilton	(Germany) Mercedes	Report
20	(Brazil) Brazilian Grand Prix	(United Kingdom) Lewis Hamilton	(Netherlands) Max Verstappen	(United Kingdom) Lewis Hamilton	(Germany) Mercedes	Report
21	(United Arab Emirates) Abu Dhabi Grand Prix	(United Kingdom) Lewis Hamilton	(Germany) Sebastian Vettel	(United Kingdom) Lewis Hamilton	(Germany) Mercedes	Report

=== Scoring system ===
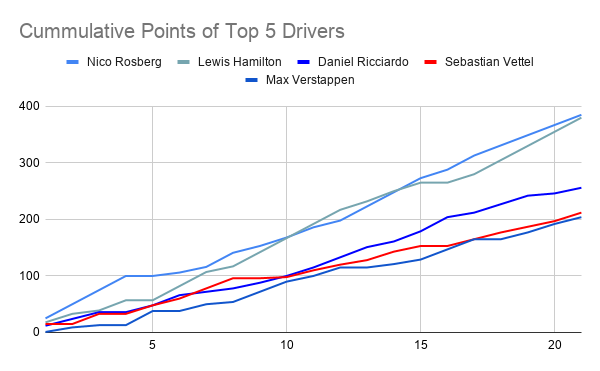

Points were awarded to the top ten classified finishers in every race, using the following structure:

Position	1st	2nd	3rd	4th	5th	6th	7th	8th	9th	10th
Points	25	18	15	12	10	8	6	4	2	1

In the event of a tie, a count-back system was used as a tie-breaker, with a driver's best result used to decide the standings. (Note: In the event that two or more drivers or constructors achieved the same best result an equal number of times, their next-best result would be used, and so on. If two or more or constructors would have achieved equal results an equal number of times, the FIA would have nominated the winner according to such criteria as it thought fit.)

=== World Drivers' Championship standings ===
Pos.	Driver	AUS (Australia)	BHR (Bahrain)	CHN (China)	RUS (Russia)	ESP (Spain)	MON (Monaco)	CAN (Canada)	EUR (Azerbaijan)	AUT (Austria)	GBR (United Kingdom)	HUN (Hungary)	GER (Germany)	BEL (Belgium)	ITA (Italy)	SIN (Singapore)	MAL (Malaysia)	JPN (Japan)	USA (United States)	MEX (Mexico)	BRA (Brazil)	ABU (United Arab Emirates)	Points
1	(Germany) Nico Rosberg	1	1^{F}	1^{P}	1^{P}^{F}	Ret	7	5^{F}	1^{P}^{F}	4	3^{F}	2^{P}	4^{P}	1^{P}	1	1^{P}	3^{F}	1^{P}	2	2	2	2	385
2	(United Kingdom) Lewis Hamilton	2^{P}	3^{P}	7	2	Ret^{P}	1^{F}	1^{P}	5	1^{P}^{F}	1^{P}	1	1	3^{F}	2^{P}	3	Ret^{P}	3	1^{P}	1^{P}	1^{P}	1^{P}	380
3	(Australia) Daniel Ricciardo	4^{F}	4	4	11	4	2^{P}	7	7	5	4	3	2^{F}	2	5	2^{F}	1	6	3	3^{F}	8	5	256
4	(Germany) Sebastian Vettel	3	DNS	2	Ret	3	4	2	2	Ret	9	4	5	6	3	5	Ret	4^{F}	4^{F}	5	5	3^{F}	212
5	(Netherlands) Max Verstappen	10	6	8	Ret	1	Ret	4	8	2	2	5	3	11	7	6	2	2	Ret	4	3^{F}	4	204
6	(Finland) Kimi Räikkönen	Ret	2	5	3	2	Ret	6	4	3	5	6^{F}	6	9	4	4	4	5	Ret	6	Ret	6	186
7	(Mexico) Sergio Pérez	13	16	11	9	7	3	10	3	17†	6	11	10	5	8	8	6	7	8	10	4	8	101
8	(Finland) Valtteri Bottas	8	9	10	4	5	12	3	6	9	14	9	9	8	6	Ret	5	10	16	8	11	Ret	85
9	(Germany) Nico Hülkenberg	7	15	15^{F}	Ret	Ret	6	8	9	19†	7	10	7	4	10	Ret	8	8	Ret	7	7	7	72
10	(Spain) Fernando Alonso	Ret		12	6	Ret	5	11	Ret	18†	13	7	12	7	14^{F}	7	7	16	5	13	10	10	54
11	(Brazil) Felipe Massa	5	8	6	5	8	10	Ret	10	20†	11	18	Ret	10	9	12	13	9	7	9	Ret	9	53
12	(Spain) Carlos Sainz Jr.	9	Ret	9	12	6	8	9	Ret	8	8	8	14	Ret	15	14	11	17	6	16	6	Ret	46
13	(France) Romain Grosjean	6	5	19	8	Ret	13	14	13	7	Ret	14	13	13	11	DNS	Ret	11	10	20	DNS	11	29
14	(Russia) Daniil Kvyat	DNS	7	3	15	10^{F}	Ret	12	Ret	Ret	10	16	15	14	Ret	9	14	13	11	18	13	Ret	25
15	(United Kingdom) Jenson Button	14	Ret	13	10	9	9	Ret	11	6	12	Ret	8	Ret	12	Ret	9	18	9	12	16	Ret	21
16	(Denmark) Kevin Magnussen	12	11	17	7	15	Ret	16	14	14	17†	15	16	Ret	17	10	Ret	14	12	17	14	Ret	7
17	(Brazil) Felipe Nasr	15	14	20	16	14	Ret	18	12	13	15	17	Ret	17	Ret	13	Ret	19	15	15	9	16	2
18	(United Kingdom) Jolyon Palmer	11	DNS	22	13	13	Ret	Ret	15	12	Ret	12	19	15	Ret	15	10	12	13	14	Ret	17	1
19	(Germany) Pascal Wehrlein	16	13	18	18	16	14	17	Ret	10	Ret	19	17	Ret	Ret	16	15	22	17	Ret	15	14	1
20	(Belgium) Stoffel Vandoorne		10																				1
21	(Mexico) Esteban Gutiérrez	Ret	Ret	14	17	11	11	13	16	11	16	13	11	12	13	11	Ret	20	Ret	19	Ret	12	0
22	(Sweden) Marcus Ericsson	Ret	12	16	14	12	Ret	15	17	15	Ret	20	18	Ret	16	17	12	15	14	11	Ret	15	0
23	(France) Esteban Ocon													16	18	18	16	21	18	21	12	13	0
24	(Indonesia) Rio Haryanto	Ret	17	21	Ret	17	15	19	18	16	Ret	21	20										0
Pos.	Driver	AUS (Australia)	BHR (Bahrain)	CHN (China)	RUS (Russia)	ESP (Spain)	MON (Monaco)	CAN (Canada)	EUR (Azerbaijan)	AUT (Austria)	GBR (United Kingdom)	HUN (Hungary)	GER (Germany)	BEL (Belgium)	ITA (Italy)	SIN (Singapore)	MAL (Malaysia)	JPN (Japan)	USA (United States)	MEX (Mexico)	BRA (Brazil)	ABU (United Arab Emirates)	Points

Key
Colour	Result
Gold	Winner
Silver	Second place
Bronze	Third place
Green	Other points position
Blue	Other classified position
Blue	Not classified, finished (NC)
Purple	Not classified, retired (Ret)
Red	Did not qualify (DNQ)
Black	Disqualified (DSQ)
White	Did not start (DNS)
White	Race cancelled (C)
Blank	Did not practice (DNP)
Blank	Excluded (EX)
Blank	Did not arrive (DNA)
Blank	Withdrawn (WD)
Blank	Did not enter (empty cell)
Annotation	Meaning
P	Pole position
F	Fastest lap

Notes:

- † – Drivers did not finish the Grand Prix, but were classified as they completed more than 90% of the race distance.

=== World Constructors' Championship standings ===
In the event of a tie, a count-back system was used as a tie-breaker, with a constructor's best result used to decide the standings.

Pos.	Constructor	AUS (Australia)	BHR (Bahrain)	CHN (China)	RUS (Russia)	ESP (Spain)	MON (Monaco)	CAN (Canada)	EUR (Azerbaijan)	AUT (Austria)	GBR (United Kingdom)	HUN (Hungary)	GER (Germany)	BEL (Belgium)	ITA (Italy)	SIN (Singapore)	MAL (Malaysia)	JPN (Japan)	USA (United States)	MEX (Mexico)	BRA (Brazil)	ABU (United Arab Emirates)	Points
1	(Germany) Mercedes	1	1^{F}	1^{P}	1^{P}^{F}	Ret	1^{F}	1^{P}	1^{P}^{F}	1^{P}^{F}	1^{P}	1	1	1^{P}	1	1^{P}	3^{F}	1^{P}	1^{P}	1^{P}	1^{P}	1^{P}	765
1	(Germany) Mercedes	2^{P}	3^{P}	7	2	Ret^{P}	7	5^{F}	5	4	3^{F}	2^{P}	4^{P}	3^{F}	2^{P}	3	Ret^{P}	3	2	2	2	2	765
2	(Austria) Red Bull Racing-TAG Heuer	4^{F}	4	3	11	1	2^{P}	4	7	2	2	3	2^{F}	2	5	2^{F}	1	2	3	3^{F}	3^{F}	4	468
2	(Austria) Red Bull Racing-TAG Heuer	DNS	7	4	15	4	Ret	7	8	5	4	5	3	11	7	6	2	6	Ret	4	8	5	468
3	(Italy) Ferrari	3	2	2	3	2	4	2	2	3	5	4	5	6	3	4	4	4^{F}	4^{F}	5	5	3^{F}	398
3	(Italy) Ferrari	Ret	DNS	5	Ret	3	Ret	6	4	Ret	9	6^{F}	6	9	4	5	Ret	5	Ret	6	Ret	6	398
4	Force India-Mercedes	7	15	11	9	7	3	8	3	17†	6	10	7	4	8	8	6	7	8	7	4	7	173
4	Force India-Mercedes	13	16	15^{F}	Ret	Ret	6	10	9	19†	7	11	10	5	10	Ret	8	8	Ret	10	7	8	173
5	(United Kingdom) Williams-Mercedes	5	8	6	4	5	10	3	6	9	11	9	9	8	6	12	5	9	7	8	11	9	138
5	(United Kingdom) Williams-Mercedes	8	9	10	5	8	12	Ret	10	20†	14	18	Ret	10	9	Ret	13	10	16	9	Ret	Ret	138
6	(United Kingdom) McLaren-Honda	14	10	12	6	9	5	11	11	6	12	7	8	7	12	7	7	16	5	12	10	10	76
6	(United Kingdom) McLaren-Honda	Ret	Ret	13	10	Ret	9	Ret	Ret	18†	13	Ret	12	Ret	14^{F}	Ret	9	18	9	13	16	Ret	76
7	(Italy) Toro Rosso-Ferrari	9	6	8	12	6	8	9	Ret	8	8	8	14	14	15	9	11	13	6	16	6	Ret	63
7	(Italy) Toro Rosso-Ferrari	10	Ret	9	Ret	10^{F}	Ret	12	Ret	Ret	10	16	15	Ret	Ret	14	14	17	11	18	13	Ret	63
8	(United States) Haas-Ferrari	6	5	14	8	11	11	13	13	7	16	13	11	12	11	11	Ret	11	10	19	Ret	11	29
8	(United States) Haas-Ferrari	Ret	Ret	19	17	Ret	13	14	16	11	Ret	14	13	13	13	DNS	Ret	20	Ret	20	DNS	12	29
9	(France) Renault	11	11	17	7	13	Ret	16	14	12	17†	12	16	15	17	10	10	12	12	14	14	17	8
9	(France) Renault	12	DNS	22	13	15	Ret	Ret	15	14	Ret	15	19	Ret	Ret	15	Ret	14	13	17	Ret	Ret	8
10	(Switzerland) Sauber-Ferrari	15	12	16	14	12	Ret	15	12	13	15	17	18	17	16	13	12	15	14	11	9	15	2
10	(Switzerland) Sauber-Ferrari	Ret	14	20	16	14	Ret	18	17	15	Ret	20	Ret	Ret	Ret	17	Ret	19	15	15	Ret	16	2
11	(United Kingdom) MRT-Mercedes	16	13	18	18	16	14	17	18	10	Ret	19	17	16	18	16	15	21	17	21	12	13	1
11	(United Kingdom) MRT-Mercedes	Ret	17	21	Ret	17	15	19	Ret	16	Ret	21	20	Ret	Ret	18	16	22	18	Ret	15	14	1
Pos.	Constructor	AUS (Australia)	BHR (Bahrain)	CHN (China)	RUS (Russia)	ESP (Spain)	MON (Monaco)	CAN (Canada)	EUR (Azerbaijan)	AUT (Austria)	GBR (United Kingdom)	HUN (Hungary)	GER (Germany)	BEL (Belgium)	ITA (Italy)	SIN (Singapore)	MAL (Malaysia)	JPN (Japan)	USA (United States)	MEX (Mexico)	BRA (Brazil)	ABU (United Arab Emirates)	Points

Key
Colour	Result
Gold	Winner
Silver	Second place
Bronze	Third place
Green	Other points position
Blue	Other classified position
Blue	Not classified, finished (NC)
Purple	Not classified, retired (Ret)
Red	Did not qualify (DNQ)
Black	Disqualified (DSQ)
White	Did not start (DNS)
White	Race cancelled (C)
Blank	Did not practice (DNP)
Blank	Excluded (EX)
Blank	Did not arrive (DNA)
Blank	Withdrawn (WD)
Blank	Did not enter (empty cell)
Annotation	Meaning
P	Pole position
F	Fastest lap

Notes:

- † – Drivers did not finish the Grand Prix, but were classified as they completed more than 90% of the race distance.
- The standings are sorted by best result, rows are not related to the drivers. In case of tie on points, a certain position is achieved determines the outcome.

== See also ==
- 2016 Formula One pre-season testing
