= 2016 Singapore Grand Prix =

Race 15 of 21 in the 2016 Formula One World Championship
← Previous race	Next race →
- Layout of the Marina Bay Street Circuit

Race details
- Date: 18 September 2016
- Official name: 2016 Formula 1 Singapore Airlines Singapore Grand Prix
- Location: Marina Bay Street Circuit; Marina Bay, Singapore
- Course: Temporary street circuit
- Course length: 5.065 km (3.147 miles)
- Distance: 61 laps, 308.828 km (191.897 miles)
- Weather: Clear; 30 °C (86 °F) air temperature 34–35 °C (93–95 °F) track temperature 1.5 m/s (4.9 ft/s) wind from the east
- Attendance: 218,824 (Weekend); 73,000 (3-Day Average)

Pole position
Driver	(Germany) Nico Rosberg	Mercedes
- Time: 1:42.584

Fastest lap
Driver	(Australia) Daniel Ricciardo	Red Bull Racing-TAG Heuer
- Time: 1:47.187 on lap 49

Podium
First	(Germany) Nico Rosberg	Mercedes
Second	(Australia) Daniel Ricciardo	Red Bull Racing-TAG Heuer
Third	(United Kingdom) Lewis Hamilton	Mercedes

The 2016 Singapore Grand Prix (formally known as the 2016 Formula 1 Singapore Airlines Singapore Grand Prix) was a Formula One motor race held on 18 September 2016 at the Marina Bay Street Circuit in Marina Bay, Singapore. It was the fifteenth round of the 2016 Formula One World Championship, and marked the seventeenth running of the Singapore Grand Prix and the ninth time the race had been held at Marina Bay.

Nico Rosberg started the race from pole position and led throughout, holding off a late challenge by Daniel Ricciardo to win by less than half a second in his 200th race in Formula One. Sebastian Vettel was awarded the Driver of the Day award after moving 17 spots to claim 5th position.

== Background ==
=== Championship standings before the race ===
Mercedes driver Lewis Hamilton entered the race leading the World Drivers' Championship by two points, ahead of teammate Nico Rosberg. In the World Constructors' Championship, Mercedes held a lead of 208 points. Red Bull Racing was placed second and Ferrari third. Ferrari driver Sebastian Vettel was the defending race winner.

== Qualifying ==
Pos.	Car no.	Driver	Constructor	Qualifying times			Final grid
Pos.	Car no.	Driver	Constructor	Q1	Q2	Q3	Final grid
1	6	(Germany) Nico Rosberg	Mercedes	1:45.316	1:43.020	1:42.584	1
2	3	(Australia) Daniel Ricciardo	Red Bull Racing-TAG Heuer	1:44.255	1:43.933	1:43.115	2
3	44	(United Kingdom) Lewis Hamilton	Mercedes	1:45.167	1:43.471	1:43.288	3
4	33	(Netherlands) Max Verstappen	Red Bull Racing-TAG Heuer	1:45.036	1:44.112	1:43.328	4
5	7	(Finland) Kimi Räikkönen	Ferrari	1:44.964	1:44.159	1:43.540	5
6	55	(Spain) Carlos Sainz Jr.	Toro Rosso-Ferrari	1:45.499	1:44.493	1:44.197	6
7	26	(Russia) Daniil Kvyat	Toro Rosso-Ferrari	1:45.291	1:44.475	1:44.469	7
8	27	(Germany) Nico Hülkenberg	Force India-Mercedes	1:46.081	1:44.737	1:44.479	8
9	14	(Spain) Fernando Alonso	McLaren-Honda	1:45.373	1:44.653	1:44.553	9
10	11	(Mexico) Sergio Pérez	Force India-Mercedes	1:45.204	1:44.703	1:44.582	17^{1}
11	77	(Finland) Valtteri Bottas	Williams-Mercedes	1:46.086	1:44.740		10
12	19	(Brazil) Felipe Massa	Williams-Mercedes	1:46.056	1:44.991		11
13	22	(United Kingdom) Jenson Button	McLaren-Honda	1:45.262	1:45.144		12
14	21	(Mexico) Esteban Gutiérrez	Haas-Ferrari	1:45.465	1:45.593		13
15	8	(France) Romain Grosjean	Haas-Ferrari	1:45.609	1:45.723		20^{2}
16	9	(Sweden) Marcus Ericsson	Sauber-Ferrari	1:46.427	1:47.827		14
17	20	(Denmark) Kevin Magnussen	Renault	1:46.825			15
18	12	(Brazil) Felipe Nasr	Sauber-Ferrari	1:46.860			16
19	30	(United Kingdom) Jolyon Palmer	Renault	1:46.960			18
20	94	(Germany) Pascal Wehrlein	MRT-Mercedes	1:47.667			19
21	31	(France) Esteban Ocon	MRT-Mercedes	1:48.296			21
22	5	(Germany) Sebastian Vettel	Ferrari	1:49.116			22^{3}
107% time: 1:51.552

Notes:

- ^1 – Sergio Pérez received a five-place grid penalty for failing to slow for yellow flags and an additional three-place grid penalty for passing Esteban Gutiérrez under yellows.
- ^2 – Romain Grosjean received a five-place grid penalty for a new gearbox.
- ^3 – Sebastian Vettel received a five-place grid penalty for unscheduled gearbox changes, and a twenty-place grid penalty for using additional power unit elements.

== Race ==
Romain Grosjean was unable to start the race due to brake problems. At the start Nico Rosberg got away in the lead and Fernando Alonso made a strong start up to 5th. Carlos Sainz collided with Nico Hülkenberg sending the latter into the pit wall and out of the race, while Sainz was able to continue. The safety car was deployed while Hülkenberg's car was cleared. As the safety car came in and the race resumed a Marshall was still on the track still picking up debris from the accident. After the restart Lewis Hamilton could not overtake Rosberg and Daniel Ricciardo ahead of him. Valtteri Bottas made a pit stop, but there was a delay in fastening and adjusting the detached seat belt. Bottas experienced the previous incident at the 2014 Brazilian Grand Prix, when his seat belts also loosened. Jenson Button retired from the race at two-thirds distance with a brake issue. Rosberg won the race after having to withstand late race pressure from Ricciardo with Lewis Hamilton driving a steady race to 3rd. Kimi Räikkönen came home 4th ahead of his teammate Sebastian Vettel while Max Verstappen was able to take 6th with Fernando Alonso falling back to 7th.

=== Race classification ===
Pos.	No.	Driver	Constructor	Laps	Time/Retired	Grid	Points
1	6	(Germany) Nico Rosberg	Mercedes	61	1:55:48.950	1	25
2	3	(Australia) Daniel Ricciardo	Red Bull Racing-TAG Heuer	61	+0.488	2	18
3	44	(United Kingdom) Lewis Hamilton	Mercedes	61	+8.038	3	15
4	7	(Finland) Kimi Räikkönen	Ferrari	61	+10.219	5	12
5	5	(Germany) Sebastian Vettel	Ferrari	61	+27.694	22	10
6	33	(Netherlands) Max Verstappen	Red Bull Racing-TAG Heuer	61	+1:11.197	4	8
7	14	(Spain) Fernando Alonso	McLaren-Honda	61	+1:29.198	9	6
8	11	(Mexico) Sergio Pérez	Force India-Mercedes	61	+1:51.062	17	4
9	26	(Russia) Daniil Kvyat	Toro Rosso-Ferrari	61	+1:51.557	7	2
10	20	(Denmark) Kevin Magnussen	Renault	61	+1:59.952	15	1
11	21	(Mexico) Esteban Gutiérrez	Haas-Ferrari	60	+1 Lap	13	
12	19	(Brazil) Felipe Massa	Williams-Mercedes	60	+1 Lap	11	
13	12	(Brazil) Felipe Nasr	Sauber-Ferrari	60	+1 Lap	16	
14	55	(Spain) Carlos Sainz Jr.	Toro Rosso-Ferrari	60	+1 Lap	6	
15	30	(United Kingdom) Jolyon Palmer	Renault	60	+1 Lap	18	
16	94	(Germany) Pascal Wehrlein	MRT-Mercedes	60	+1 Lap	19	
17	9	(Sweden) Marcus Ericsson	Sauber-Ferrari	60	+1 Lap	14	
18	31	(France) Esteban Ocon	MRT-Mercedes	59	+2 Laps	21	
Ret	22	(United Kingdom) Jenson Button	McLaren-Honda	43	Brakes	12	
Ret	77	(Finland) Valtteri Bottas	Williams-Mercedes	35	Overheating	10	
Ret	27	(Germany) Nico Hülkenberg	Force India-Mercedes	0	Collision	8	
DNS	8	(France) Romain Grosjean	Haas-Ferrari	0	Brakes	—	

== Championship standings after the race ==
- Bold text and an asterisk indicates who still had a theoretical chance of becoming World Champion.

Drivers' Championship standings

	Pos.	Driver	Points
1	1	(Germany) Nico Rosberg*	273
1	2	(United Kingdom) Lewis Hamilton*	265
	3	(Australia) Daniel Ricciardo*	179
	4	(Germany) Sebastian Vettel*	153
	5	(Finland) Kimi Räikkönen*	148

Constructors' Championship standings

	Pos.	Constructor	Points
	1	(Germany) Mercedes*	538
	2	(Austria) Red Bull Racing-TAG Heuer*	316
	3	(Italy) Ferrari*	301
1	4	Force India-Mercedes	112
1	5	(United Kingdom) Williams-Mercedes	111

- Note: Only the top five positions are included for both sets of standings.

== See also ==
- 2016 TCR International Series Singapore round

== Footnotes ==
Previous race: 2016 Italian Grand Prix	FIA Formula One World Championship; 2016 season	Next race: 2016 Malaysian Grand Prix
Previous race: 2015 Singapore Grand Prix	Singapore Grand Prix	Next race: 2017 Singapore Grand Prix
