= 2015 Japanese Grand Prix =

14th round of the 2015 Formula One season

Race 14 of 19 in the 2015 Formula One World Championship
← Previous race	Next race →
- Suzuka Circuit

Race details
- Date: 27 September 2015
- Official name: 2015 Formula 1 Japanese Grand Prix
- Location: Suzuka Circuit; Suzuka, Japan
- Course: Permanent racing facility
- Course length: 5.807 km (3.608 miles)
- Distance: 53 laps, 307.471 km (191.054 miles)
- Weather: Partly cloudy 27 °C (81 °F) air temperature 52–54 °C (126–129 °F) track temperature 4.5 m/s (15 ft/s) wind from the east
- Attendance: 165,000

Pole position
Driver	(Germany) Nico Rosberg	Mercedes
- Time: 1:32.584

Fastest lap
Driver	(United Kingdom) Lewis Hamilton	Mercedes
- Time: 1:36.145 on lap 33

Podium
First	(United Kingdom) Lewis Hamilton	Mercedes
Second	(Germany) Nico Rosberg	Mercedes
Third	(Germany) Sebastian Vettel	Ferrari

The 2015 Japanese Grand Prix (formally known as the 2015 Formula 1 Japanese Grand Prix) was a Formula One motor race that was held on 27 September 2015 at the Suzuka Circuit in Suzuka, Japan. The race was the fourteenth round of the 2015 World Championship, and marked the forty-first running of the Japanese Grand Prix.

Lewis Hamilton entered the race as the defending winner of the Grand Prix and Drivers' Championship leader with a 41-point lead over his Mercedes teammate Nico Rosberg. Ferrari's Sebastian Vettel came into the event eight points further back in third. Mercedes led the Constructors' Championship over Ferrari by 153 points, with Williams a further 110 points behind Ferrari.

Hamilton won the race, having overtaken Rosberg at the start, who fell back to fourth, but recovered to finish second. Rosberg's deficit in the Drivers' Championship therefore increased to 48 points. Sebastian Vettel finished third for Ferrari. This was the first race in which all cars were classified as finishers since the 2011 European Grand Prix, which would not be replicated again until the 2016 Chinese Grand Prix.

== Report ==
=== Background ===
For the third year in a row, Pirelli opted to bring its two hardest dry weather compounds for this event, the orange-banded hard compound as the "prime" selection, while the white-banded medium tyre used as the "option" selection. The two wet-weather tyres, the green-banded intermediate and blue-banded full wet tyres, were also available to use as they are at all events. Pirelli cited the nature of the track and the high lateral energy loads experienced in the corners, in particular 130R – typically taken at full throttle and top speed in dry weather racing – as reasons for the hardest tyres being used. The suppliers expected a performance difference of 0.6–0.8 seconds per lap between the compounds.

The Japanese Grand Prix was one of only two events in the 2015 season to have only one drag reduction system (DRS) zone, the other being Monaco. The DRS zone at Suzuka was in its traditional spot, on the start/finish straight between turn 18 and turn 1, with the detection point just before the Casio Triangle complex.

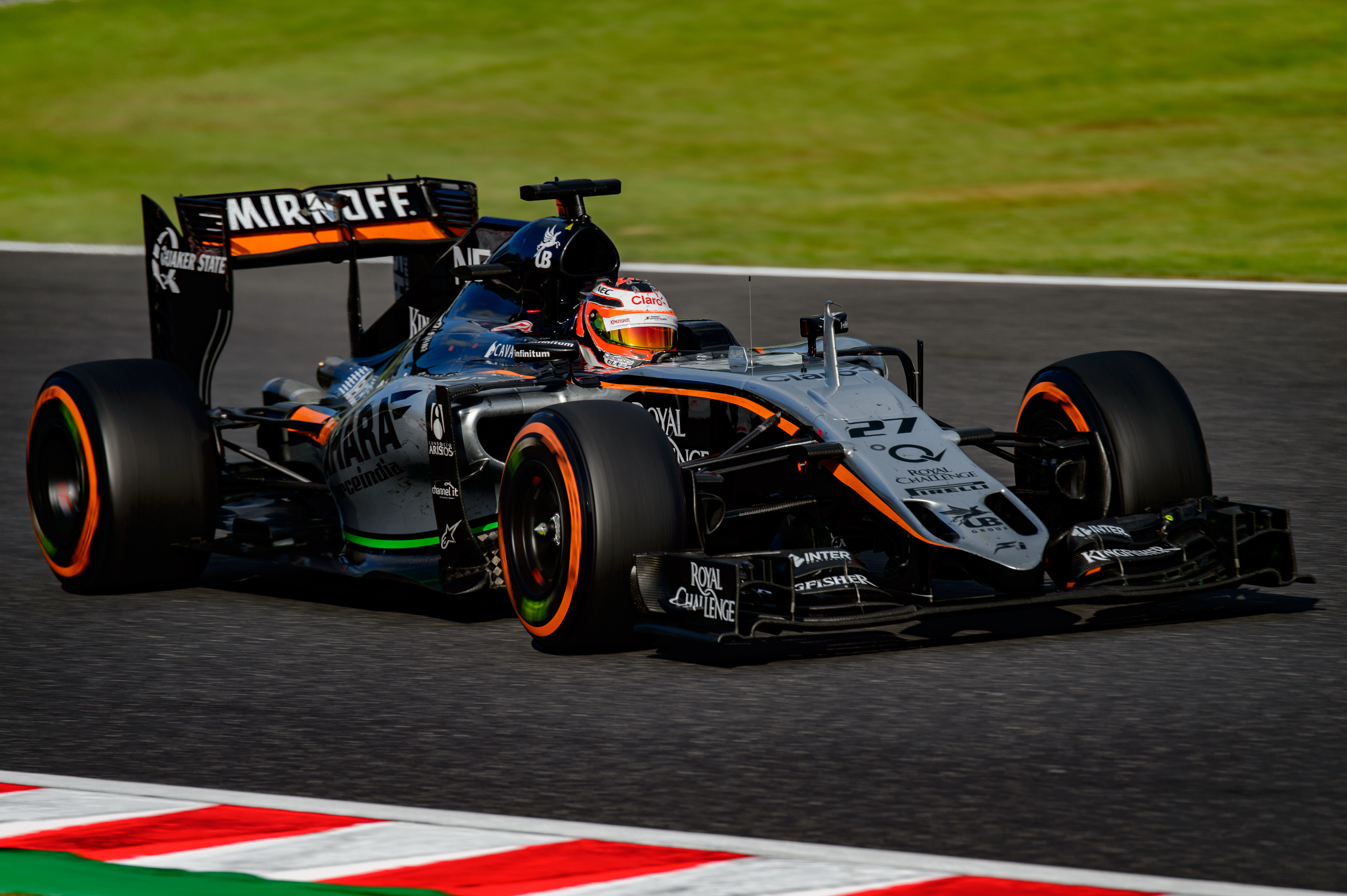
Nico Hülkenberg served a three-place grid penalty carried over from the Singapore Grand Prix.

Force India driver Nico Hülkenberg served a three-place grid penalty following qualifying after being deemed at-fault for a collision with Williams driver Felipe Massa at the previous event in Singapore. Red Bull equipped both of their cars with new turning vanes for the Grand Prix in order to improve the airflow underneath the car and therefore create more downforce. The new device had previously only been used by Daniil Kvyat during the previous race in Singapore. After a poor performance in Singapore, Mercedes introduced a revised rear wing endplate, while McLaren brought a new front wing to Suzuka.

This was the first running of the Japanese Grand Prix after Jules Bianchi's crash at the previous edition, which proved fatal when Bianchi succumbed to his injuries nine months following the accident. The Manor Marussia team announced that they would mark the occasion in a "very private way". In the wake of the accident, the Dunlop corner was slightly changed and revised in safety standards, and the organisers of the Japanese Grand Prix installed a large crane in place of the tractor that Bianchi hit. The Lotus team's equipment arrived late in Suzuka, while team members were also kept from entering their hospitality unit after cash-flow problems caused the unit not to be paid for in time.

Going into the weekend, Lewis Hamilton was leading the World Drivers' Championship on 252 points, 41 ahead of his Mercedes teammate Nico Rosberg. Sebastian Vettel of Ferrari was 8 more points behind on 203, followed by Kimi Räikkönen and Valtteri Bottas on 107 and 101 points respectively. In the World Constructors' Championship, Mercedes was leading Ferrari by 153 points, with Williams an additional 112 points behind in third.

=== Free practice ===
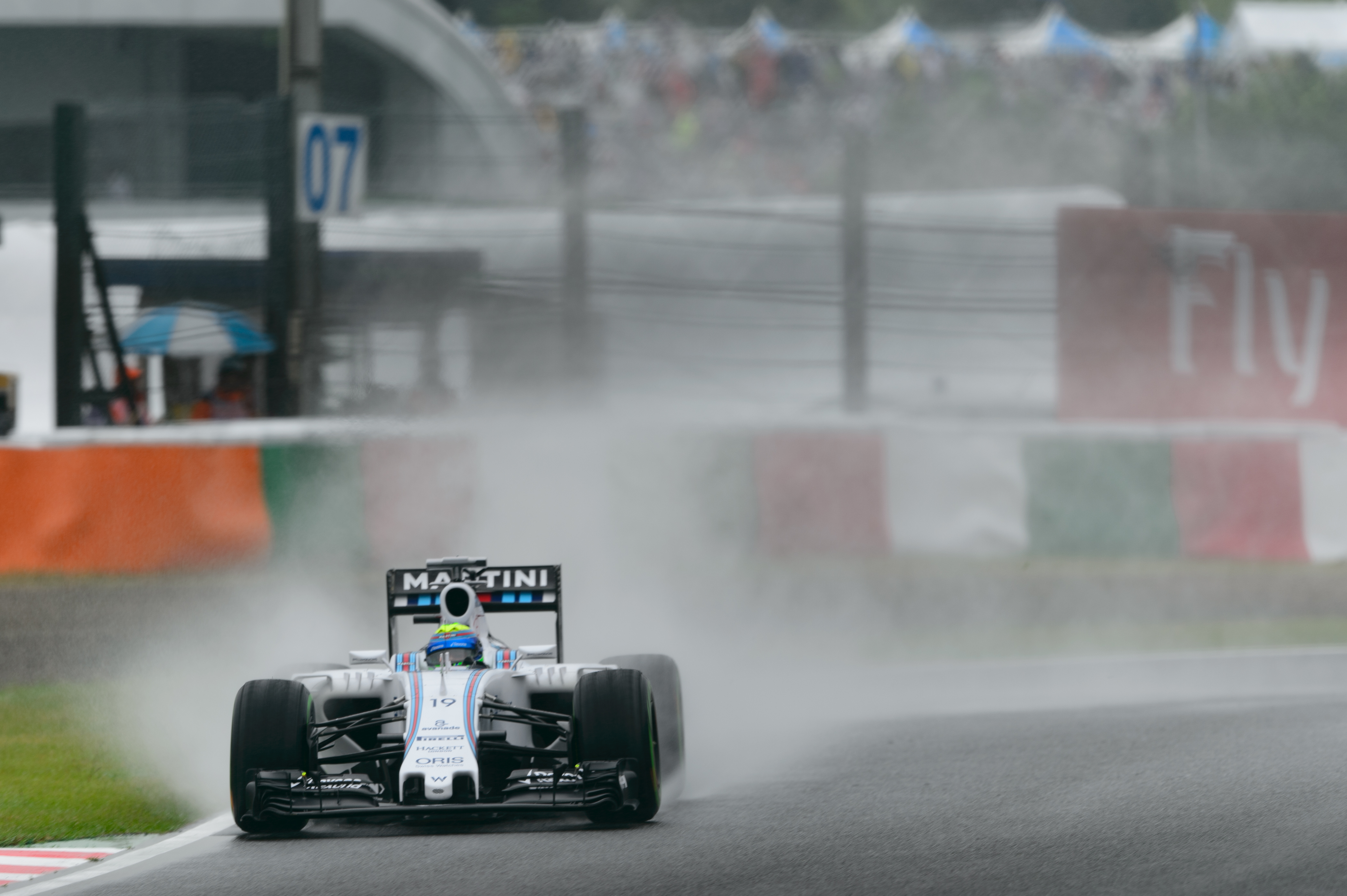
Felipe Massa pictured during the first free practice session, held in rainy conditions on Friday morning.

Per the regulations for the 2015 season, three practice sessions were held; there were two 90-minute sessions on Friday and another one-hour session before qualifying on Saturday. In first practice, Carlos Sainz Jr. set the fastest time with a 1:49.434 in rainy conditions, about half a second ahead of second placed Daniil Kvyat. Eight drivers chose not to set a time, with complaints about aquaplaning in the later stage of the session. The first fifty minutes of the session saw most drivers only drive installation laps. While the first timed laps were set on full wet tyres, the two Williams cars were the first to go out on intermediate tyres. Nico Rosberg ran with the power unit that he had used briefly at the Italian Grand Prix before it was changed due to a coolant leak. He switched back to the one he used in the previous race in Singapore for the rest of the weekend. Jolyon Palmer again took over for Romain Grosjean at Lotus, but he did not set a timed lap.

While the rain had stopped at the beginning of the second session, the track was still damp and all drivers initially ran on intermediate tyres. Daniil Kvyat eventually set the fastest time at 1:48.277, just 0.023 seconds ahead of Nico Rosberg, with Lewis Hamilton in third, half a second down on Kvyat. Sebastian Vettel set the fifth fastest time while driving the most timed laps of the session at nineteen. Sainz, fastest in first practice, heard "strange noises" from his power unit, but eventually finished seventh fastest. Felipe Massa was the only Williams driver to run, as Valtteri Bottas saved wet-weather-tyres. After more than half an hour, more rain fell and a number of drivers went out to get more running on the full-wet tyres. This included Fernando Alonso, who had been forced to wait forty minutes to start his running due to an unspecified issue with the power unit.

The third session on Saturday was held in dry conditions. The two Mercedes drivers Nico Rosberg and Lewis Hamilton set the fastest times, with Rosberg being about three-tenths of a second quicker than Hamilton. Red Bull driver Daniel Ricciardo was third, half a second down on Rosberg's 1:33.995 lap time. Kvyat in the other Red Bull did not have a good session, ending up eleventh fastest after running wide at both Spoon and the Degner corners. Behind Ricciardo, the Williams cars led the two Ferrari drivers in a session where drivers did a lot of laps to make up for the limited running on Friday.

=== Qualifying ===
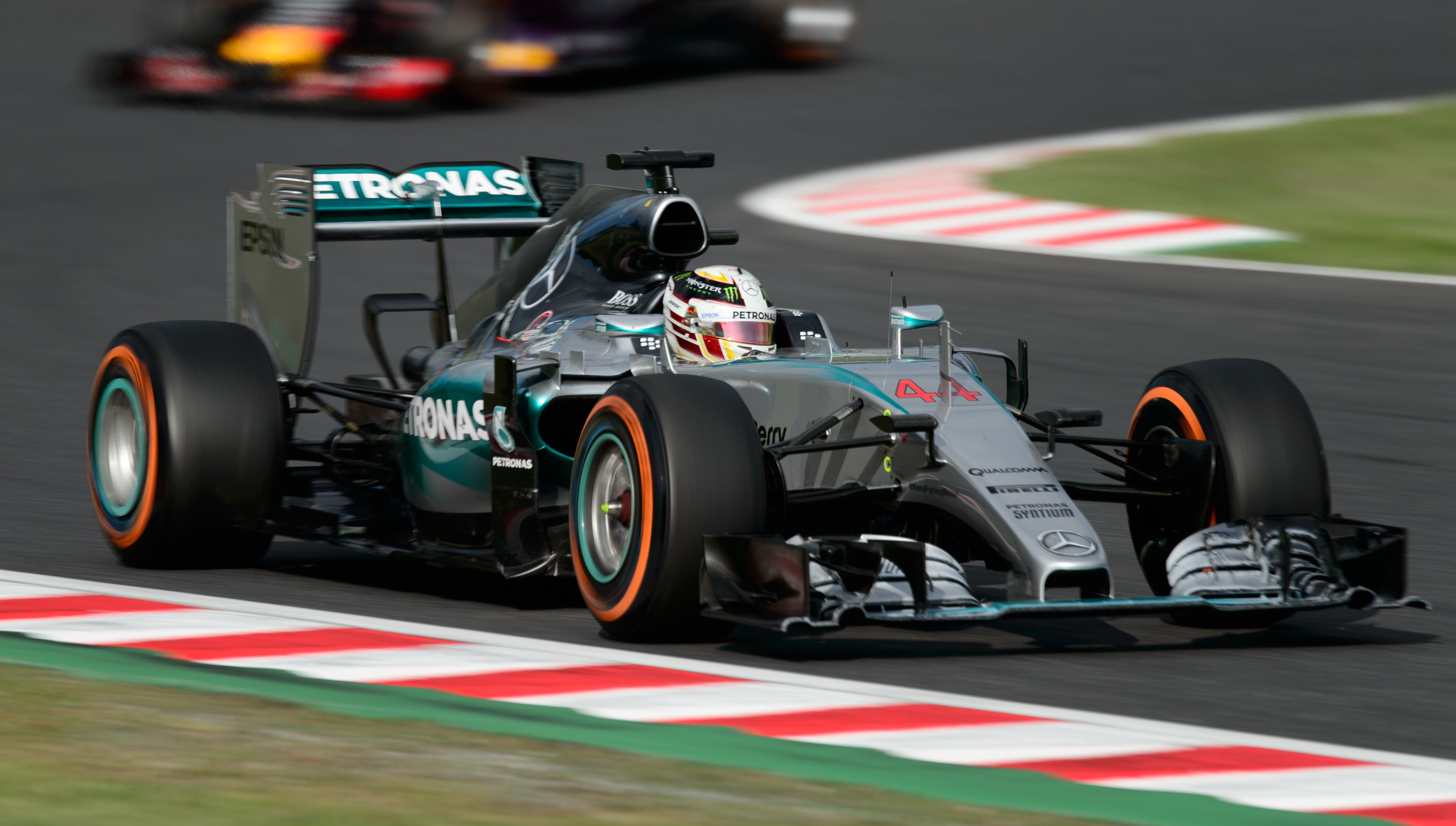
Lewis Hamilton qualified second but went on to win the race.

Qualifying consisted of three parts, 18, 15 and 12 minutes in length respectively, with five drivers eliminated from competing after each of the first two sessions. The first part of qualifying (Q1) was disrupted towards the end, when Max Verstappen's Toro Rosso came to a halt at the hairpin, preventing a number of drivers from improving on their lap times. Marcus Ericsson, whose first timed lap had been hampered by a spin, was one of the affected drivers and was eliminated in 17th place. Jenson Button also did not make it into Q2. While his second run was also affected by Verstappen, he lost time in his first due to a failure of communication concerning his engine mode. Also eliminated were the second Sauber of Felipe Nasr and both Manor Marussia cars.

Just as in Q1, the two Mercedes cars set the fastest times in Q2 as well. Verstappen was unable to continue and therefore only four of the running cars were to be eliminated. Those were Hülkenberg, the second Toro Rosso of Sainz, Pastor Maldonado and Fernando Alonso, who said his lap was likely the best he had ever driven at the circuit.

The top ten drivers contested Q3 for pole position and it was the two Mercedes drivers who set the fastest times once more, with Rosberg beating teammate Hamilton by only 0.076 seconds. Valtteri Bottas put his Williams in third while Massa lost fourth on the grid to the Ferrari of Sebastian Vettel due to a mistake towards the end of the lap. Behind Massa, Kimi Räikkönen took sixth place with what he described as an "average" lap. The positions remained unchanged as the drivers were prevented from setting better lap times, when Daniil Kvyat crashed into the barriers at turn ten, bringing out the red flag. He had touched the grass and over-corrected, and his car rolled over on impact, but Kvyat was unharmed. With only 36 seconds of the session remaining after the red flags were lifted, it was impossible to set new fast laps. Lewis Hamilton was disappointed, since he had been one and a half tenths up on his teammate on his second fast lap when the red flags came out.

=== Race ===
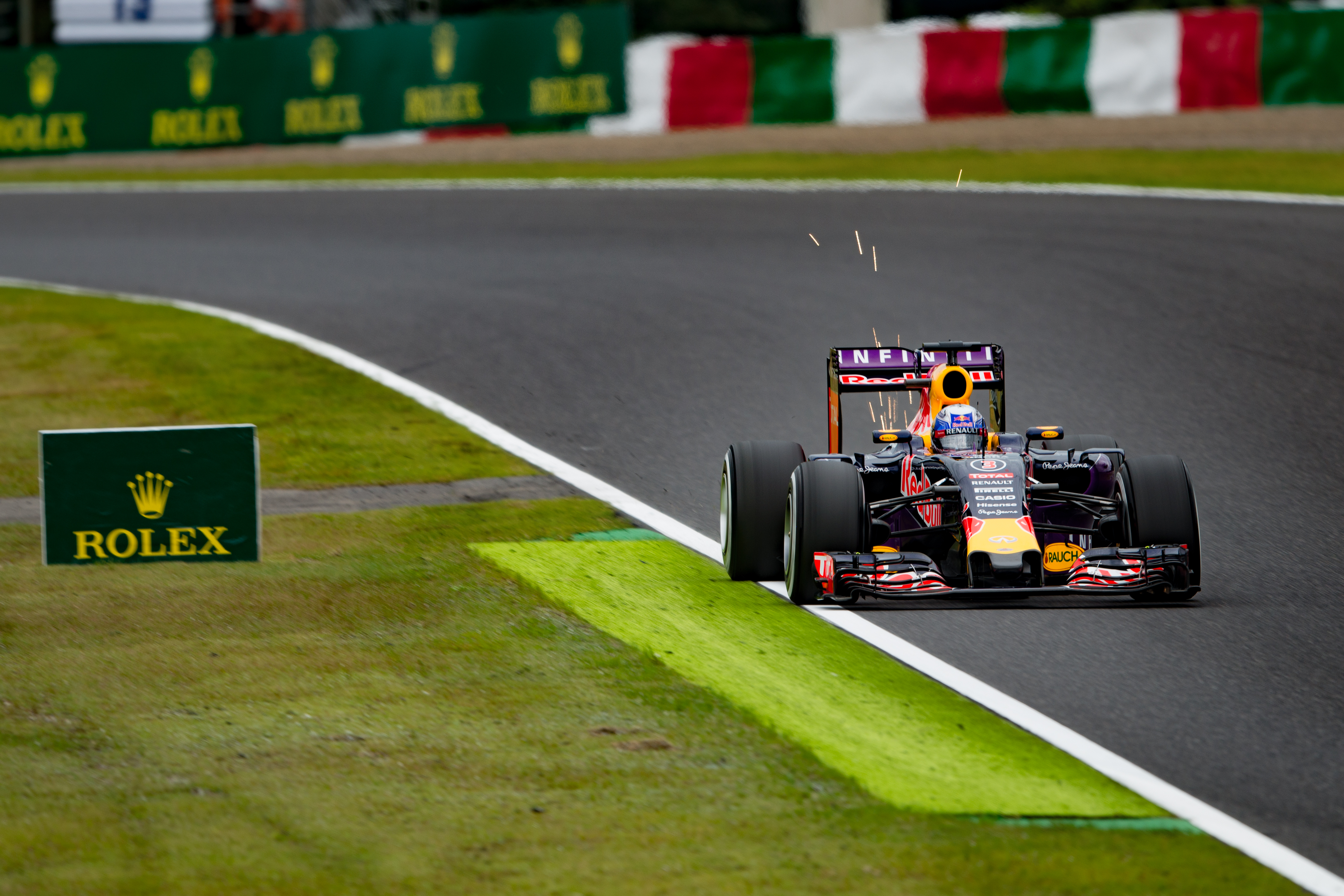
A first lap puncture dropped Daniel Ricciardo down the field, he finished fifteenth.

At the start of the race, Lewis Hamilton was able to pass teammate Nico Rosberg, who had less power available due to a temperature problem. Rosberg lost two more positions to Vettel and Bottas going into turn two, as he "had to avoid collision" with Hamilton. Further back, Daniel Ricciardo and Felipe Massa touched, resulting in punctured tyres for both drivers, with Sergio Pérez also having to go into the pit lane with a puncture. Hamilton led Vettel by 1.6 seconds after the first lap, increasing his advantage over the next couple of laps. Alonso, who had moved up the order at the start, lost ninth position to Sainz on lap four. Meanwhile, Rosberg tried to pass Bottas for third, but was told to hold off as his engine was overheating. By lap eight, Daniil Kvyat had moved up into 15th position, having started from the pit lane. Fernando Alonso was the first to come into the pit lane for a scheduled stop on lap nine. By lap eleven, Rosberg was told to resume his attempts to overtake Bottas, who in turn went into the garage for his first stop, rejoining in sixth place.

Sebastian Vettel was the next one of the front runners to pit, coming in on lap 13, while teammate Kimi Räikkönen followed a lap later. Rosberg made a pit stop on lap 15 and emerged behind Bottas, overtaking him two laps later. Meanwhile, Hamilton went into the pit lane for a tyre change on lap 16. By lap 18, Hamilton was leading Vettel by 8.1 seconds, with Rosberg a further 3.8 seconds behind. Max Verstappen entered the point scoring ranks with a pass on Fernando Alonso into turn one on lap 26. Two laps later, his Toro Rosso teammate Sainz damaged his front wing when hitting a bollard on his way into the pit lane, leading to a front wing change.

At the second round of pit stops, Räikkönen managed to get ahead of Bottas, who made pit stops simultaneously with Nico Rosberg on lap 29. Another two laps later, Vettel made a pit stop and emerged behind Rosberg, who claimed second, about ten seconds down on Hamilton, who made a pit stop on lap 32. Bottas was briefly challenged by the Lotus of Romain Grosjean, but Grosjean went off track on lap 33, while Will Stevens received a five-second penalty for speeding in the pit lane. On lap 43, Marcus Ericsson overtook Pérez for 12th and two laps later, Verstappen moved ahead of teammate Sainz for ninth. Pérez lost another position to Kvyat on lap 45. Another lap later, Stevens went into a spin while fighting for position with Alexander Rossi, who finished ahead of his more experienced teammate for the second race in a row. By lap 49, Kvyat moved ahead of Ericsson as well to claim 13th position. Two laps from the end, Felipe Nasr became the first retirement of the race, albeit he would be classified in last, four laps behind the winner. Lewis Hamilton took victory comfortably, finishing 18.9 seconds ahead of Rosberg.

=== Post-race ===
At the podium interviews, conducted by Kai Ebel, a German TV reporter, Lewis Hamilton stressed that it was important to him to "strike back" after his retirement in Singapore. Later on in the press conference, he commented on equalling Ayrton Senna's number of victories: "Also knowing that this would be the race that I would equal Ayrton, who won here and who had quite an interesting [sic] here. So, yeah, quite an emotional day. But to be honest I'm not a teary guy, so I'm just full of joy and happiness and light and I'm really grateful for [...] all the people who have helped me get to where I am today and this team, because without them I would not be here." Nico Rosberg acknowledged that "it's going the wrong way" in terms of his championship hopes as he would have needed a victory and declared: "Just need to try to win next time out." Sebastian Vettel lamented his chances at second place, as he said that he could have stayed in front of Rosberg had he made a pit stop a lap earlier during the second round of stops, However, he stated that "with hindsight, it's always easy so, nevertheless, it's a great day". Hamilton followed up on his delight at matching Senna later on, saying: "For me to win here at a race where I loved watching Ayrton drive and to match his wins, it doesn't feel real at the moment." Senna had won his three world championship titles at Suzuka.

While successful on track, the Mercedes team got into a discussion with Formula One chief executive Bernie Ecclestone over the TV coverage time their drivers received during the Grand Prix. Over the ninety-minute race, Mercedes cars were visible for only six minutes, leading to their non-executive chairman Niki Lauda saying: "I was watching TV all day long, and funny enough I saw Saubers and a lot of Honda cars, but I don't know why [...]. Somebody must do the filming here. I have to ask what's wrong with him. I want to see Bernie next week and ask him what is the reason." Speaking about hitting the pit bollard at his stop, Carlos Sainz Jr. said it had been a "rookie error" due to his urgency to overtake Pastor Maldonado during the pit stops. Daniil Kvyat, who finished 13th after starting in the pit lane complained about the race, saying: "It was pretty boring for me out there this afternoon because a combination of circumstances meant I had to just sit back and was unable to attack. [...] In the end, I did manage to overtake some people, but it wasn't great. It's frustrating and annoying, but there was nothing I could do."

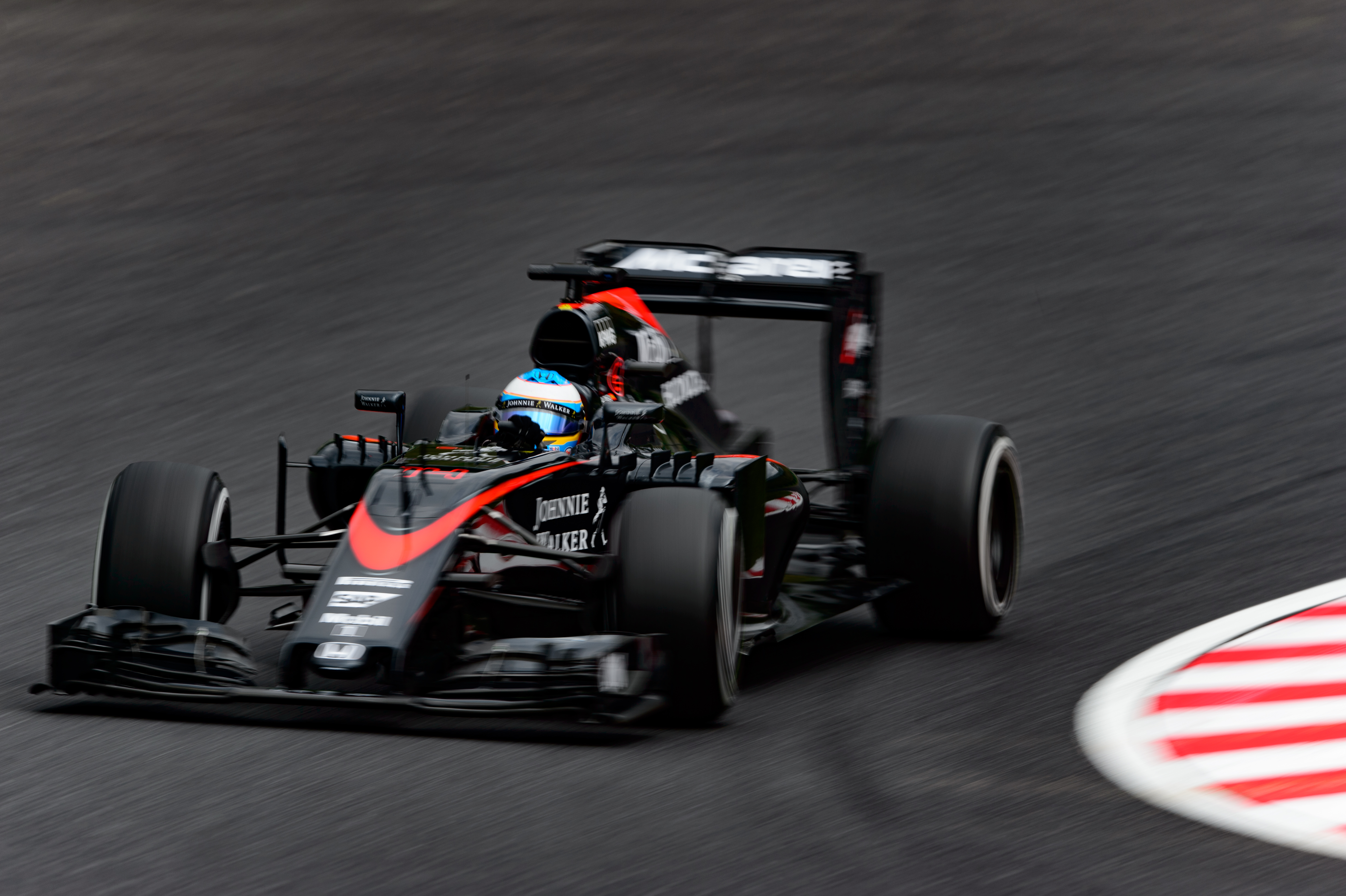
A radio message from Fernando Alonso sparked controversy at McLaren.

Friction emerged at McLaren over the race weekend. Fernando Alonso publicly criticised the power unit provided by local company Honda. When being overtaken by Max Verstappen on lap 27, Alonso yelled "GP2 engine, GP2!" on the team radio, comparing his power unit with those of Formula One's feeder series. Alonso elaborated after the race, saying: "I feel embarrassed when I'm racing sometimes because it's frustrating when you see the other cars making mistakes, going off the racing line, getting sideways. You look in the mirror on the straight to look for them and they are already side by side with you. The deficit we have on power is like another category." Team CEO Ron Dennis in turn criticised Alonso for his outspoken words, saying: "It doesn't show the professionalism I would like all our drivers to show." Jenson Button had expounded the problems of the power unit on team radio as well, lamenting the fact that other cars had been able to pass him into 130R corner. The row in the team, which The Daily Telegraph described as being a "complete meltdown", came amidst speculation about the future of both drivers. Ron Dennis admitted publicly to not having dealt with the question of Jenson Button's role in 2016 earlier, following much debate over the driver's future. However, speculation ended when Button was confirmed as a McLaren driver for 2016 just five days later. After the race, Alonso had also left his future with the team open, but made it clear a day later that he intended to end his career with the team, writing: "No one should have any doubt that I have three years with McLaren and my career in F1 will end with this team, hopefully winning everything." About his comments on the team radio he said: "We keep working hard. We all want to win and sometimes transmit the team radios, but it should be private chats."

As a result of the race, Hamilton extended his lead over teammate Nico Rosberg in the Drivers' Championship to 48 points, with Sebastian Vettel a further eleven points behind in third. Mercedes cemented their lead in the Constructors' standings, now leading Ferrari by 506 to 337 points, with Williams in third, an additional 129 points behind.

== Classification ==
=== Qualifying ===
Pos.	Car no.	Driver	Constructor	Qualifying times			Final grid
Pos.	Car no.	Driver	Constructor	Q1	Q2	Q3	Final grid
1	6	(Germany) Nico Rosberg	Mercedes	1:33.015	1:32.632	1:32.584	1
2	44	(United Kingdom) Lewis Hamilton	Mercedes	1:32.844	1:32.789	1:32.660	2
3	77	(Finland) Valtteri Bottas	Williams-Mercedes	1:34.326	1:33.416	1:33.024	3
4	5	(Germany) Sebastian Vettel	Ferrari	1:34.431	1:33.844	1:33.245	4
5	19	(Brazil) Felipe Massa	Williams-Mercedes	1:34.744	1:33.377	1:33.337	5
6	7	(Finland) Kimi Räikkönen	Ferrari	1:34.171	1:33.361	1:33.347	6
7	3	(Australia) Daniel Ricciardo	Red Bull Racing-Renault	1:34.399	1:34.153	1:33.497	7
8	8	(France) Romain Grosjean	Lotus-Mercedes	1:34.398	1:34.278	1:33.967	8
9	11	(Mexico) Sergio Pérez	Force India-Mercedes	1:35.001	1:34.174	no time	9
10	26	(Russia) Daniil Kvyat	Red Bull Racing-Renault	1:34.646	1:34.201	no time	PL^{1}
11	27	(Germany) Nico Hülkenberg	Force India-Mercedes	1:35.328	1:34.390		13^{2}
12	55	(Spain) Carlos Sainz Jr.	Toro Rosso-Renault	1:34.873	1:34.453		10
13	13	(Venezuela) Pastor Maldonado	Lotus-Mercedes	1:34.796	1:34.497		11
14	14	(Spain) Fernando Alonso	McLaren-Honda	1:35.467	1:34.785		12
15	33	(Netherlands) Max Verstappen	Toro Rosso-Renault	1:34.522	no time		17^{3}
16	22	(United Kingdom) Jenson Button	McLaren-Honda	1:35.664			14
17	9	(Sweden) Marcus Ericsson	Sauber-Ferrari	1:35.673			15
18	12	(Brazil) Felipe Nasr	Sauber-Ferrari	1:35.760			16
19	28	(United Kingdom) Will Stevens	Marussia-Ferrari	1:38.783			18
107% time: 1:39.343
—	53	(United States) Alexander Rossi	Marussia-Ferrari	1:47.114			19^{4}

Notes

- ^1 – Daniil Kvyat had to receive a new chassis due to his heavy crash during Q3, resulting in a pit lane start penalty.
- ^2 – Nico Hülkenberg received a 3-place grid penalty for causing a collision with Felipe Massa at the previous race in Singapore.
- ^3 – Max Verstappen received a 3-place grid penalty for stopping his car in a potentially dangerous position during Q1.
- ^4 – Alexander Rossi received permission from the stewards to start the race, despite not setting a time within 107% of the fastest lap time during Q1.

=== Race ===
Pos.	No.	Driver	Constructor	Laps	Time/Retired	Grid	Points
1	44	(United Kingdom) Lewis Hamilton	Mercedes	53	1:28:06.508	2	25
2	6	(Germany) Nico Rosberg	Mercedes	53	+18.964	1	18
3	5	(Germany) Sebastian Vettel	Ferrari	53	+20.850	4	15
4	7	(Finland) Kimi Räikkönen	Ferrari	53	+33.768	6	12
5	77	(Finland) Valtteri Bottas	Williams-Mercedes	53	+36.746	3	10
6	27	(Germany) Nico Hülkenberg	Force India-Mercedes	53	+55.559	13	8
7	8	(France) Romain Grosjean	Lotus-Mercedes	53	+1:12.298	8	6
8	13	(Venezuela) Pastor Maldonado	Lotus-Mercedes	53	+1:13.575	11	4
9	33	(Netherlands) Max Verstappen	Toro Rosso-Renault	53	+1:35.315	17	2
10	55	(Spain) Carlos Sainz Jr.	Toro Rosso-Renault	52	+1 lap	10	1
11	14	(Spain) Fernando Alonso	McLaren-Honda	52	+1 lap	12	
12	11	(Mexico) Sergio Pérez	Force India-Mercedes	52	+1 lap	9	
13	26	(Russia) Daniil Kvyat	Red Bull Racing-Renault	52	+1 lap	PL	
14	9	(Sweden) Marcus Ericsson	Sauber-Ferrari	52	+1 lap	15	
15	3	(Australia) Daniel Ricciardo	Red Bull Racing-Renault	52	+1 lap	7	
16	22	(United Kingdom) Jenson Button	McLaren-Honda	52	+1 lap	14	
17	19	(Brazil) Felipe Massa	Williams-Mercedes	51	+2 laps	5	
18	53	(United States) Alexander Rossi	Marussia-Ferrari	51	+2 laps	19	
19	28	(United Kingdom) Will Stevens	Marussia-Ferrari	50	+3 laps	18	
20^{1}	12	(Brazil) Felipe Nasr	Sauber-Ferrari	49	Mechanical	16	

Notes

- ^1 – Felipe Nasr was classified as he had completed 90% of the race distance.

== Championship standings after the race ==
- Bold text and an asterisk indicates who still had a mathematical chance of becoming World Champion.

Drivers' Championship standings

Pos.	Driver	Points
1	(United Kingdom) Lewis Hamilton*	277
2	(Germany) Nico Rosberg*	229
3	(Germany) Sebastian Vettel*	218
4	(Finland) Kimi Räikkönen	119
5	(Finland) Valtteri Bottas	111

Constructors' Championship standings

Pos.	Constructor	Points
1	(Germany) Mercedes*	506
2	(Italy) Ferrari*	337
3	(United Kingdom) Williams-Mercedes	208
4	(Austria) Red Bull Racing-Renault	139
5	Force India-Mercedes	77

- Note: Only the top five positions are included for both sets of standings.
- Bold text and an asterisk indicates competitors who still had a mathematical chance of becoming World Champion.

Previous race: 2015 Singapore Grand Prix	FIA Formula One World Championship; 2015 season	Next race: 2015 Russian Grand Prix
Previous race: 2014 Japanese Grand Prix	Japanese Grand Prix	Next race: 2016 Japanese Grand Prix
