= 2015 Singapore Grand Prix =

Race 13 of 19 in the 2015 Formula One World Championship
← Previous race	Next race →
- Marina Bay Street Circuit

Race details
- Date: 20 September 2015
- Official name: 2015 Formula 1 Singapore Airlines Singapore Grand Prix
- Location: Marina Bay Street Circuit; Marina Bay, Singapore
- Course: Temporary street circuit
- Course length: 5.065 km (3.147 miles)
- Distance: 61 laps, 308.828 km (191.897 miles)
- Weather: Dry; 28–29 °C (82–84 °F) air temperature 34–36 °C (93–97 °F) track temperature 0.5 m/s (1.6 ft/s) wind from the west
- Attendance: 260,912 (Weekend); 86,970 (3-Day Average)

Pole position
Driver	(Germany) Sebastian Vettel	Ferrari
- Time: 1:43.885

Fastest lap
Driver	(Australia) Daniel Ricciardo	Red Bull Racing-Renault
- Time: 1:50.041 on lap 52

Podium
First	(Germany) Sebastian Vettel	Ferrari
Second	(Australia) Daniel Ricciardo	Red Bull Racing-Renault
Third	(Finland) Kimi Räikkönen	Ferrari

The 2015 Singapore Grand Prix (formally known as the 2015 Formula 1 Singapore Airlines Singapore Grand Prix) was a Formula One motor race held on 20 September 2015 at the Marina Bay Street Circuit in Marina Bay, Singapore. The race was the thirteenth round of the 2015 season. It was the eighth time the race was run as a round of the Formula One World Championship.

Defending race winner Lewis Hamilton of Mercedes entered as the leader in the World Drivers' Championship with 252 points, 53 points ahead of teammate Nico Rosberg and 74 points ahead of Ferrari's Sebastian Vettel. Mercedes came into the race leading the Constructors' Championship by 181 points ahead of Ferrari, with Williams a further 82 points back in third place.

Vettel won the race from pole position, ahead of Red Bull's Daniel Ricciardo in second and Vettel's Ferrari teammate Kimi Räikkönen in third. The Mercedes team struggled at Singapore; Lewis Hamilton recorded his first retirement of the season, while Nico Rosberg managed only fourth place, closing the gap in the championship to 41 points.

This is the only Grand Prix in the 2015 season where Mercedes did not secure a pole position, with their drivers qualifying fifth and sixth.

== Report ==
=== Background ===
Coming to Singapore, Nico Rosberg was forced to change his power unit after his engine failure at the previous race in Italy. Using his fourth unit of the season, Rosberg was one power unit change away from a possible grid penalty. Alexander Rossi made his Formula One debut after signing a five-race deal to replace Roberto Merhi at Manor Marussia. Acting as race stewards at the Grand Prix were Garry Connelly from Australia and Vincenzo Spano from Venezuela, who assisted driver steward Martin Donnelly in his first appearance in this position since the 2014 Malaysian Grand Prix. Sauber brought a "heavily-updated car" to the Grand Prix, featuring a shorter nose and revised front and rear wings as well as a new engine cover and brake ducts. Toro Rosso also came to Singapore with new parts, bringing a revised front wing. Red Bull introduced a new component as well: Daniil Kvyat's car was equipped with new turning vanes installed to improve the airflow under the car and therefore create more downforce. The feature would be run by both cars at the following Japanese Grand Prix. Further updates included changes to the diffuser, rear wing, brake ducts and bodywork of the Force India VJM08B and modifications to the floor in front of the rear wheels of the Ferrari SF15-T.

The FIA approved minor changes to the layout of the Marina Bay Street Circuit ahead of the Grand Prix. The modifications ran from turn 11 to turn 13; drivers still turned right at turn 11 but it now kinked left slightly on entry, with the track shifting to the left-hand side of Fullerton Road. This changed the profile of turn 12, as drivers now used the other side of the Anderson Bridge, while the hairpin at turn 13 has been widened by a metre in order to increase overtaking opportunities. The drag reduction system (DRS) had two activation zones for the race; the first between turns five and seven down the length of Raffles Boulevard, and the second on the start/finish straight between turn 23 to turn one.

As in the previous year's event, and third season in a row, Pirelli, Formula One's sole tyre supplier, brought its yellow-banded soft compound tyre as the harder "prime" tyre and the red-banded supersoft compound tyre as the softer "option" tyre, as well as the green-banded intermediate weather and the blue-banded full-wet weather compounds.

With forest fires continuing to burn in neighboring Indonesia, heavy smog was a concern for the event. Unhealthy levels forced the cancellation of other events in Singapore in the week leading up to the Grand Prix. Race organisers, however, did not speculate whether the Grand Prix was also under threat of cancellation. It was later reported that the smog had lifted and that the race could go ahead without any restrictions.

Coming into the race weekend, Lewis Hamilton was leading the Drivers' Championship with 252 points, 53 points ahead of Nico Rosberg, his teammate at Mercedes. Another 21 points behind in third was Sebastian Vettel, driving for Ferrari. In the Constructors' Standings, Mercedes were leading on 451 points, followed by Ferrari and Williams with 270 and 188 points respectively.

=== Free practice ===
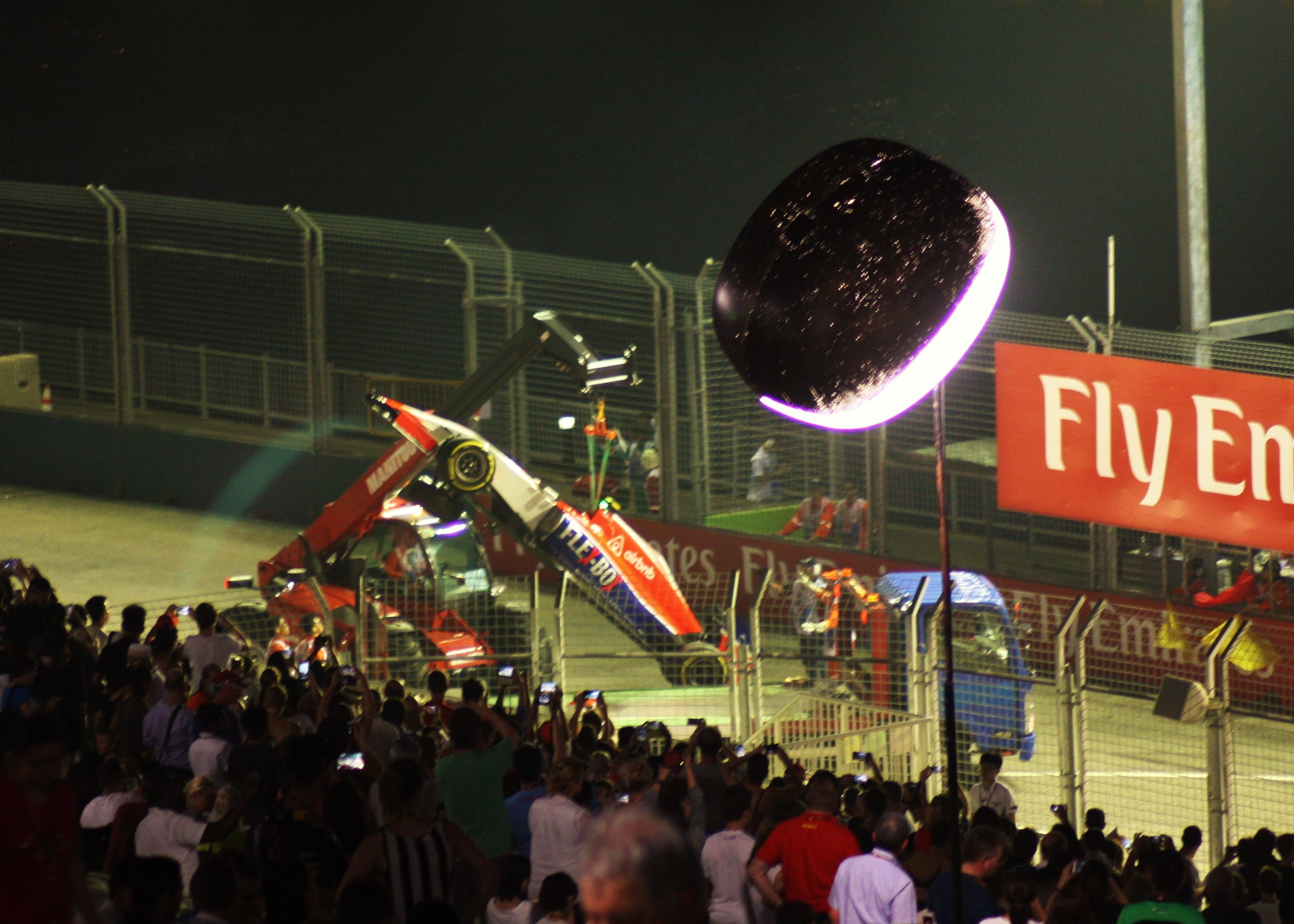
Alexander Rossi crashed towards the end of the first free practice session.

Per the regulations for the 2015 season, three practice sessions were held; there were two 90-minute sessions on Friday and another one-hour session before qualifying on Saturday. Since Singapore was a night race, the practice sessions started at a later local time; 18:00 for the first and 21:30 for the second session on Friday. This meant that the gap between the first two practice sessions was half an hour shorter than in other races. The two Mercedes cars were fastest in the first session on Friday, with Nico Rosberg topping the time sheets at 1:47.995. Championship leader Lewis Hamilton was second, 0.319 seconds behind, while Daniel Ricciardo was 0.017 seconds slower in third, ahead of the two Ferrari cars of Sebastian Vettel and Kimi Räikkönen, even though Vettel briefly left the track in turn five towards the end of the session. While Ricciardo felt he could go even faster, his teammate Daniil Kvyat was able to put in only eight laps due to a fuel system problem, and he finished the session eighteenth, just ahead of the two Manor Marussia drivers. Manor's Alexander Rossi placed last, albeit close to teammate Will Stevens, before crashing out at turn 18, ending the last timed runs of all other drivers left on track.

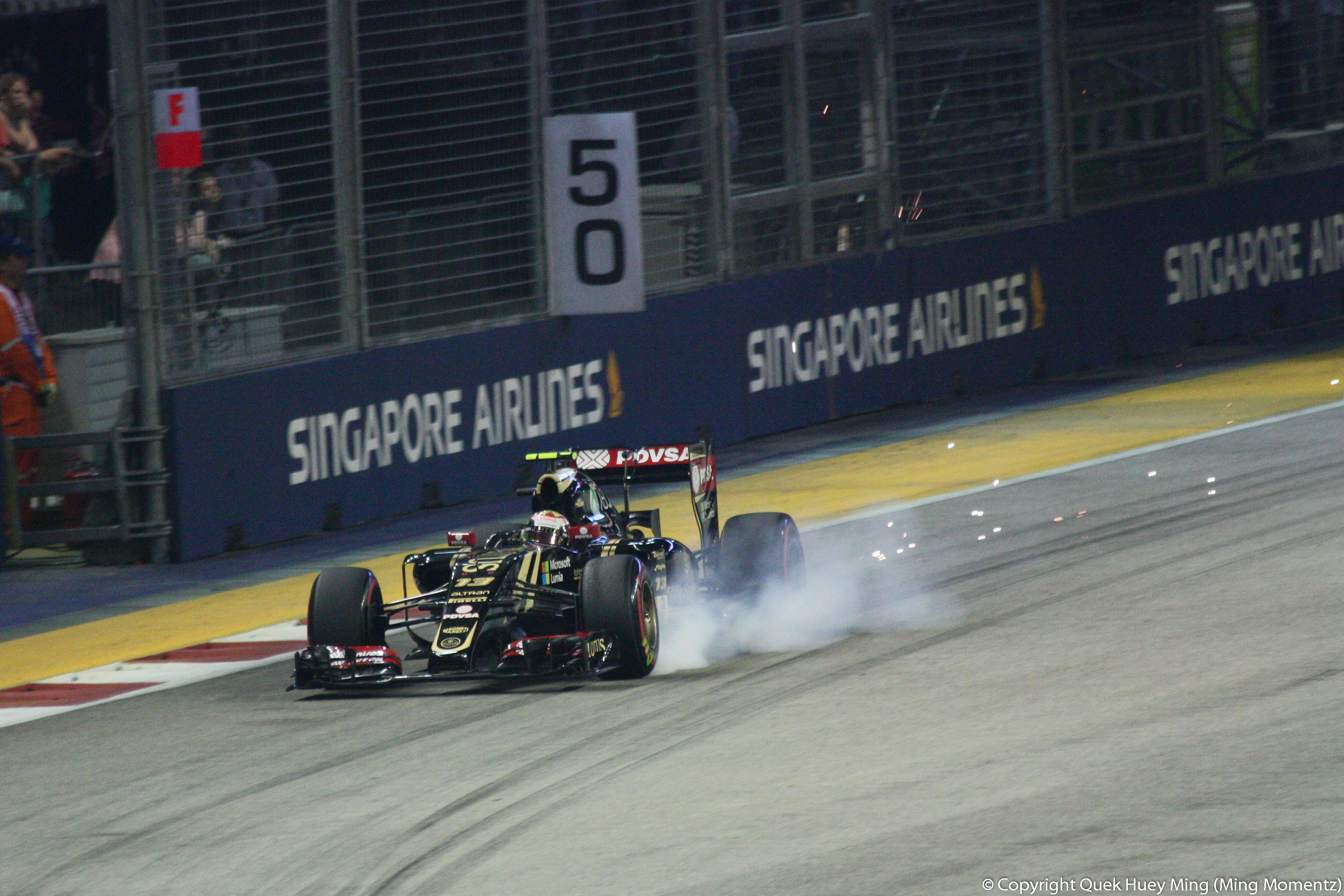
Pastor Maldonado locks up into turn two during the second practice session.

Early on in practice two, Will Stevens became the second Manor driver to make contact with the barriers, damaging his car. Teammate Rossi was limited to only three laps of running as his team spent most of the session repairing the damage from the shunt in first practice, he eventually finished almost 14 seconds down on Daniil Kvyat, who topped the session with a time of 1:46.142. The second Red Bull of Daniel Ricciardo finished third, with Räikkönen in between the two. Hamilton was the fastest Mercedes driver in fourth, while Rosberg managed only seventh fastest, behind Sebastian Vettel and Sergio Pérez. Fernando Alonso finished eighth for McLaren, also within a second of Kvyat. However, his teammate Jenson Button, who was 14th with a detuned power unit, still expressed disappointment at the team's pace, saying he had hoped the car to be better. Several drivers made minor contact with the walls on the narrow Singapore circuit, including Pastor Maldonado and Carlos Sainz Jr., who suffered a left-rear puncture after hitting the wall at turn five. After the performances by both Red Bull and Ferrari, Lewis Hamilton expected a "genuine challenge" from both teams over the rest of the weekend. Meanwhile, both Red Bull's Daniel Ricciardo and Ferrari's Sebastian Vettel were less optimistic. While Ricciardo said he was "still not looking to them [Mercedes]", Vettel felt that Mercedes "looked a bit slow but I'm sure they will change it for tomorrow".

In the third practice session on Saturday evening, the two Ferraris were in front, with Vettel fastest at 1:45.682, while Räikkönen was almost half a second off his teammate's pace. The two Red Bull cars of Kvyat and Ricciardo were behind, followed by both Mercedes cars, who trailed Vettel by more than a second. Meanwhile, Fernando Alonso continued McLaren's good form and finished seventh fastest. Lewis Hamilton had several problems during the session; an early run was interrupted by him leaving the track and he was later called to drive through the pit lane to cool down his overheating car. Valtteri Bottas was the fastest Williams driver in eleventh, just in front of Nico Hülkenberg, who drove a revised version of his Force India. The two Manor Marussia cars were again last, with Rossi almost three seconds ahead of Stevens.

=== Qualifying ===
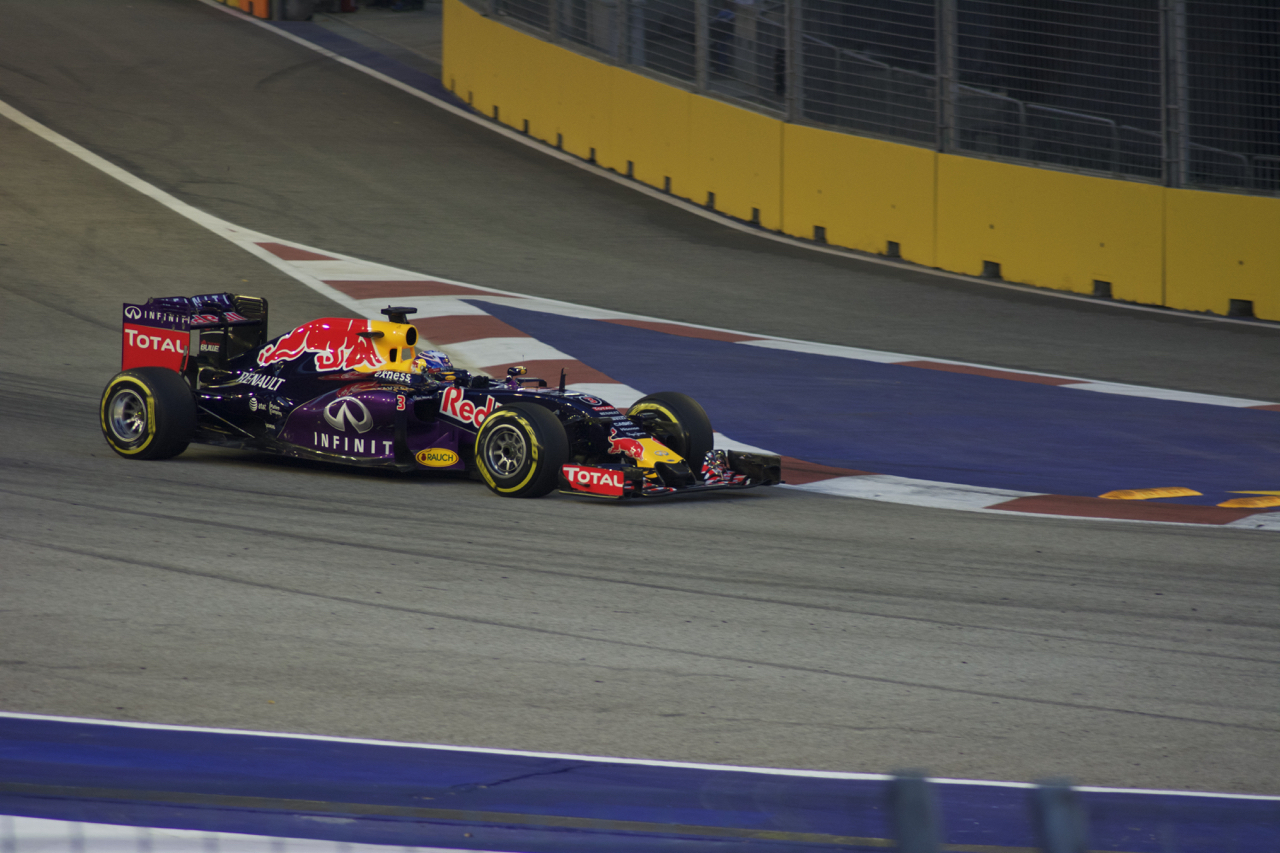
Daniel Ricciardo, pictured in qualifying, finished the race in second place.

Qualifying consisted of three parts, 18, 15 and 12 minutes in length respectively, with five drivers eliminated from competing after each of the first two sessions. During the first part of qualifying (Q1), only the Ferrari were confident enough to run only on the slower, harder tyres, while the rest of the field needed to equip the super-soft compound. Daniil Kvyat topped the session with a time of 1:45.340 on the supersoft tyre. Pastor Maldonado was eliminated, as were the two Manor Marussia drivers, who were even further off the pace than usual. Both of the team's drivers received a five-place grid penalty for a gearbox change. Both Sauber drivers also did not make it into Q2, when Jenson Button was the last to set a fast lap, edging out Felipe Nasr by less than a tenth of a second.

Vettel set the fastest time in the second part of qualifying as well, being two-tenths faster than second placed Daniil Kvyat. While Max Verstappen made it into Q3, his teammate Sainz hit the wall in turn 19 close to the end of the session, damaging his suspension and front wing, with parts of debris left on the track. With the session ending under yellow flags, both Force India and both McLaren drivers joined Sainz in elimination, with Nico Hülkenberg fastest in eleventh place on the grid. Drivers were unable to improve on their lap times because of the yellow flags.

At the beginning of Q3, Lewis Hamilton aborted his first fast lap. Mercedes seemed to struggle most in the final sector, where Hamilton lost half a second to the Red Bull of Kvyat. Hamilton later stated that the team had problems generating heat in the tyres, essential for the final sector that benefitted high traction. It was Sebastian Vettel who took pole position, having led the final two parts of qualifying, ahead of Daniel Ricciardo, who lost time in the first sector after having to back off from Valtteri Bottas in front of him. The other Ferrari and Red Bull of Räikkönen and Kvyat claimed third and fourth on the grid respectively, followed by both Mercedes cars, who were one and a half seconds down on Vettel's pole time of 1:43.885. This was the first pole position for Ferrari since the 2012 German Grand Prix, the first in dry conditions for five years, and also prevented Lewis Hamilton from equalling Ayrton Senna's record of eight consecutive pole positions. Vettel's pole also brought an end to Mercedes's 23-race long run of pole positions, and it was the first time since the beginning of the 2014 season that the first spot on the grid was not taken by a Mercedes-powered car.

=== Race ===
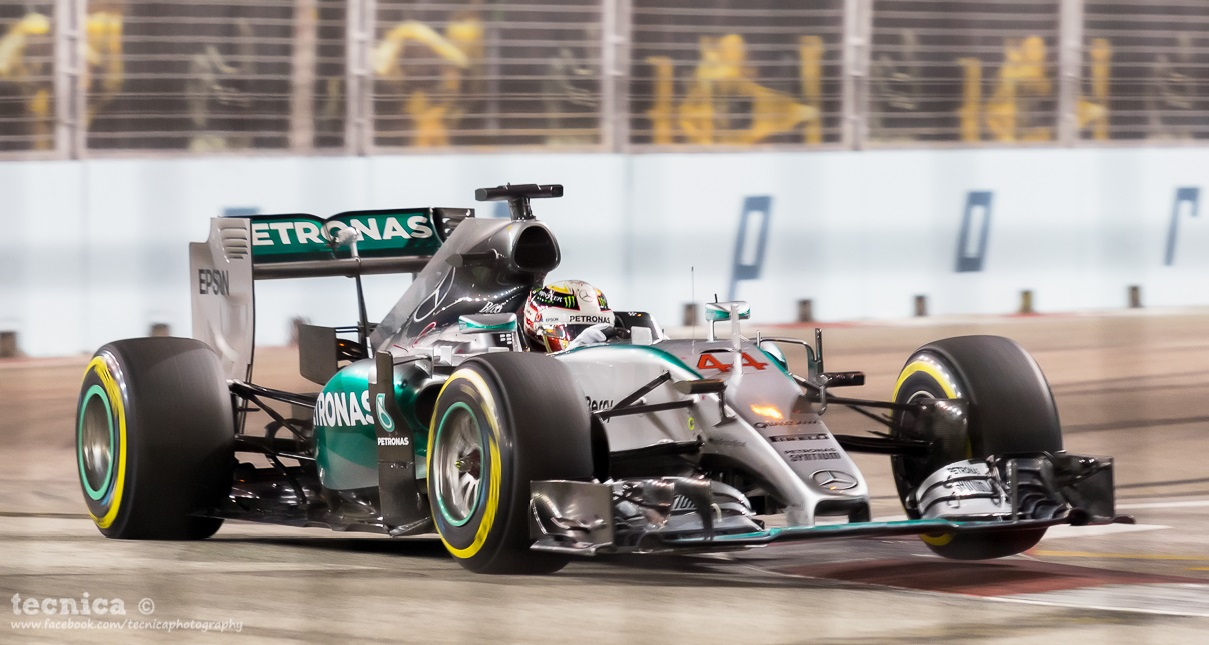
Lewis Hamilton retired from a race for the first time since the 2014 Belgian Grand Prix.

Before the formation lap, Rosberg appeared to have an issue with his car, when he stopped at the end of pit lane on the way to the start grid. However, his mechanics were able to rectify the problem, described by Niki Lauda as "a glitch", and he made it to the grid. With everyone starting on the super-soft tyre compound, a race with two pit stops was expected for most drivers. At the start, all drivers at the front of the field held their positions, while further back, Nico Hülkenberg, who had a good start, and Sergio Pérez nearly collided while fighting for position. Max Verstappen's Toro Rosso STR10 stalled on the grid and was pushed back to the pit lane, only to start his race shortly after, more than one lap down on the leaders. Vettel was able to build a gap to Ricciardo behind him quickly, leading the Red Bull by three seconds after the first lap. Fernando Alonso, who had enjoyed a decent start to move up into eleventh, came under pressure from Sainz by lap four, followed by Grosjean, who lost places at the start because he had to move around the stationary Verstappen. While Vettel's lead was about five seconds on lap five, Verstappen unlapped himself by lap six and posted fast lap times. Meanwhile, Nico Rosberg held off the two Williams cars of Bottas and Massa, while Lewis Hamilton in front was able to move clear of the pack fighting for sixth place. Kimi Räikkönen in third place was held at a distance by Ricciardo, trailing him by 1.6 seconds on lap nine. A lap later, Grosjean became the first driver to pit. More cars came in on lap eleven, leading to heavy traffic that prevented Sainz and Alonso from leaving their pit boxes, costing time. Alonso emerged from pit lane ahead of Grosjean, who moved past him into thirteenth. Felipe Massa had a slow stop of 4.8 seconds when he made a pit stop at the end of lap 13. When he emerged from pit lane, Nico Hülkenberg was approaching on the racing line. Both drivers collided, with Hülkenberg being catapulted off Massa's front right tyre, causing him to retire from the race. A Virtual Safety Car period ensued, that saw all drivers pit that had not done so before. Since Kvyat had made a pit stop shortly before the safety car was deployed, both Mercedes cars were able to move in front of him, leaving Kvyat in sixth place. Jenson Button's stop took a long time, dropping him to 16th place. By lap 16, the virtual was replaced by the actual safety car, which stayed out until the end of lap 18.

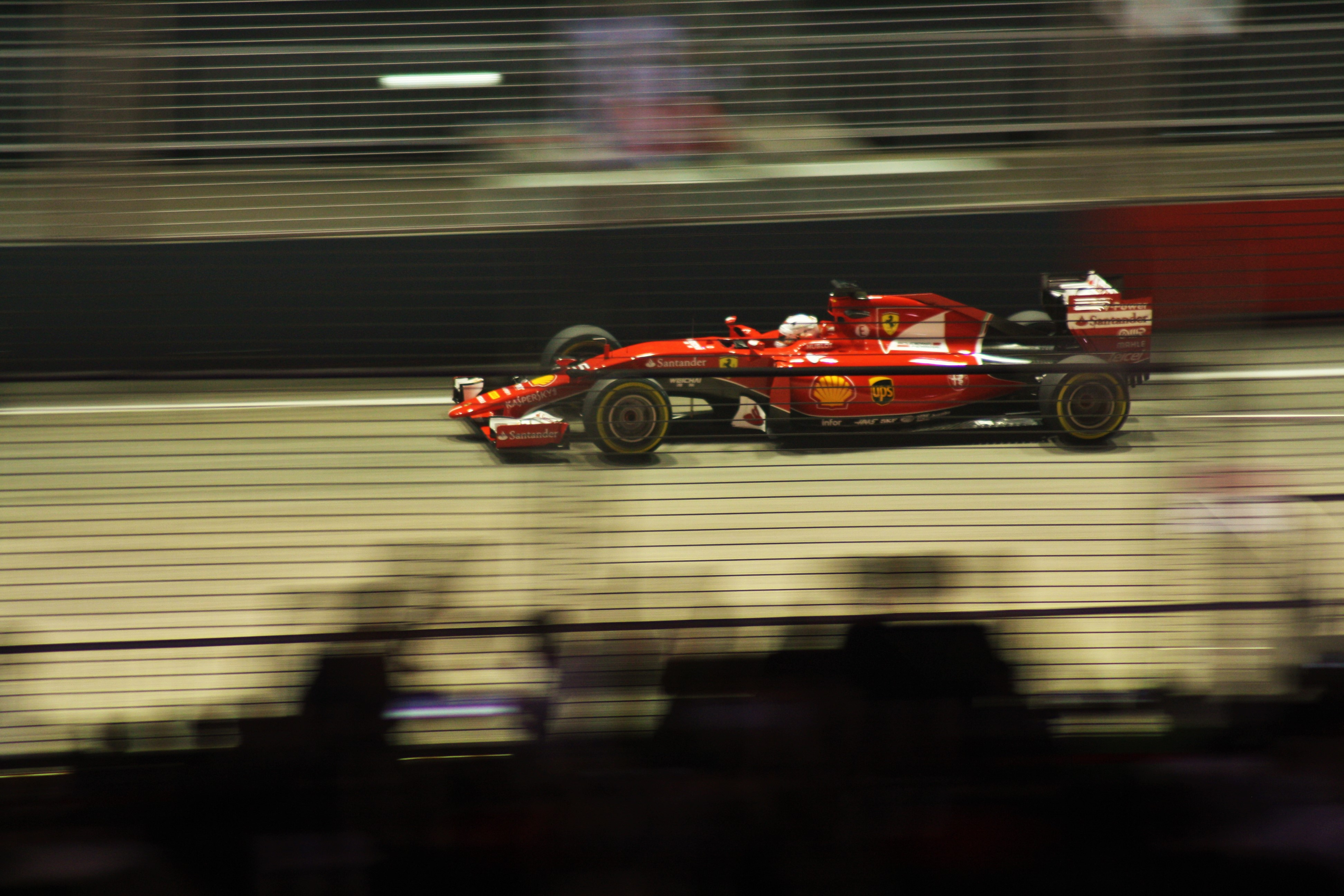
Sebastian Vettel won the race for Scuderia Ferrari.

At the restart, Sainz was caught out by his car being stuck in neutral, losing many places and dropping back to 18th position, but managed to continue. The safety car had meanwhile allowed his teammate Verstappen to move closer to the pack, being about half a lap down on lap 20. The next laps saw Vettel setting a steady pace at the front to conserve his tyres, leading Hamilton to declare that "Vettel's backing up Ricciardo" on team radio. On lap 26, Hamilton reported a loss of power to his crew. He subsequently lost positions rapidly, dropping back to ninth by lap 28, eventually retiring on lap 33. Meanwhile, Felipe Massa had problems with his car as well. Similar to Sainz, he saw his car switch to neutral. After driving through pit lane without stopping on lap 30, he retired a lap later, with Fernando Alonso also ending his race on lap 34 with a defective gearbox. On the same lap, Daniil Kvyat came in for his second pit stop, but trouble with the tyres caused him to lose positions as he dropped to ninth. Around the same time, Vettel held a five-second advantage over Ricciardo, while Pérez overtook Grosjean for ninth on lap 36.

A second safety car period was caused on lap 37 by a man walking on the track. Several drivers again used the safety car to pit for new tyres, including Jenson Button, who emerged in tenth place. By lap 40, Alexander Rossi was instructed to unlap himself behind the safety car, but when he failed to do so in an acceptable time, the race was resumed on lap 41, with Rossi stuck between the front runners. By lap 42, Button was racing Pastor Maldonado for position, when both collided in turn 15, damaging Button's front wing, who was forced to pit to have it exchanged. Button rejoined in 14th place, telling his team on the radio "I should have known, really, that he's mental", speaking about Maldonado. By lap 45, Max Verstappen, who had started more than a lap behind, was up to ninth and set the new fastest lap of the race. One lap later, he took eighth place from Grosjean. His teammate Sainz followed two laps later, with Grosjean complaining that Sainz had left him "nowhere to go". Meanwhile, at the front, Ricciardo set a fastest lap on lap 51, being 2.9 seconds behind leading man Vettel. Lap 53 saw Jenson Button become the second McLaren to retire, suffering from a gearbox issue as well. During the closing stages of the race, Valtteri Bottas in fifth experienced gearbox problems of his own, but was able to continue. On lap 60, Grosjean ran wide and let Felipe Nasr move through into the final point scoring position, tenth. During the last lap, Toro Rosso instructed Verstappen to let his teammate Sainz pass him for eighth, but Verstappen refused and stayed in place. Sebastian Vettel crossed the line to win the race, which took the entire allowed span of two hours.

=== Post-race ===
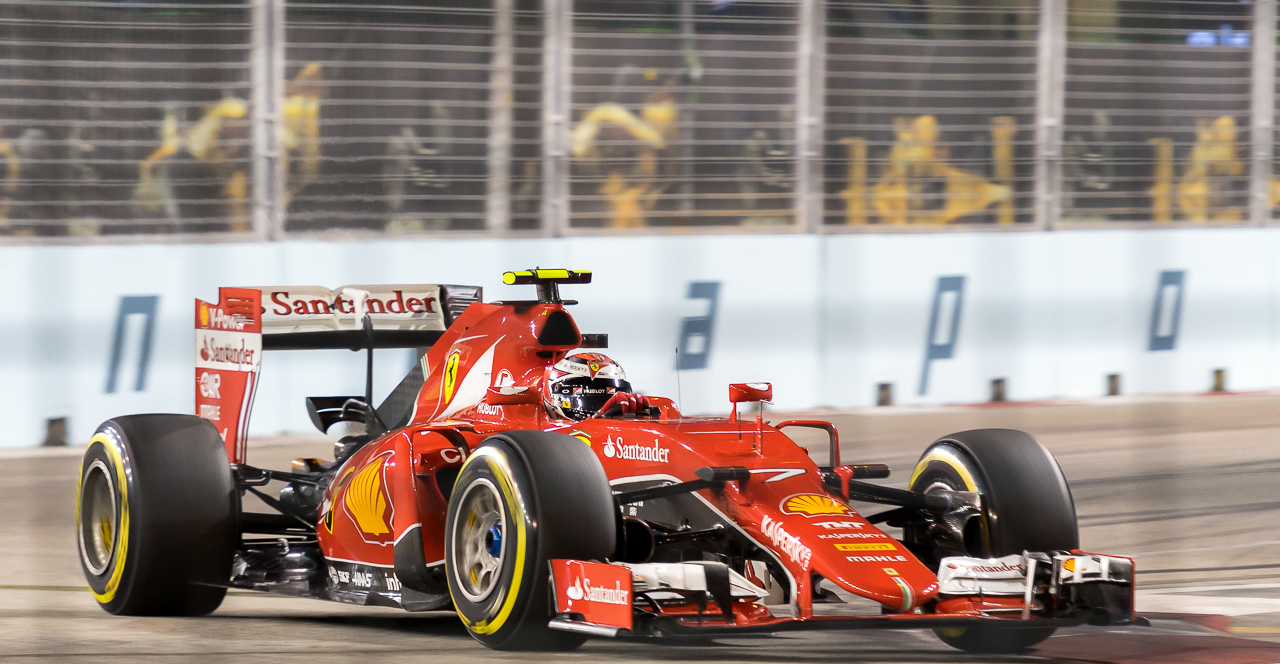
Kimi Räikkönen recorded his second podium finish of the season.

At the podium interviews, conducted by former team owner Eddie Jordan, Sebastian Vettel described the race as one of his best ever, calling it "a great day; we had a really great weekend". He also revealed that his drink bottle had failed halfway into the race, causing him to become thirsty as drivers lose two to three litres in sweat during the Singapore race. Second placed Daniel Ricciardo said he felt that an undercut, overtaking Vettel by pitting earlier might have been possible had it not been for the safety car periods. Kimi Räikkönen expressed surprise at his performance, considering that he had struggled with the handling of the car both in qualifying and the race. Speaking about the track intruder, Sebastian Vettel stated at the post-race press conference that he "saw him taking a picture" and continued: "I hope it was a good one at least. I hope it was in focus! Yeah, pretty crazy, we approach that corner at around 280–290 klicks so, I don't know, I wouldn't cross the track if I was him. It was crazy, obviously [...]." The intruder was later revealed to be 27-year-old British citizen Yogvitam Pravin Dhokia. He appeared in court on the Tuesday following the race and was offered a bail of S$15,000, which he was unable to pay. He was later sentenced to serve six weeks in jail.

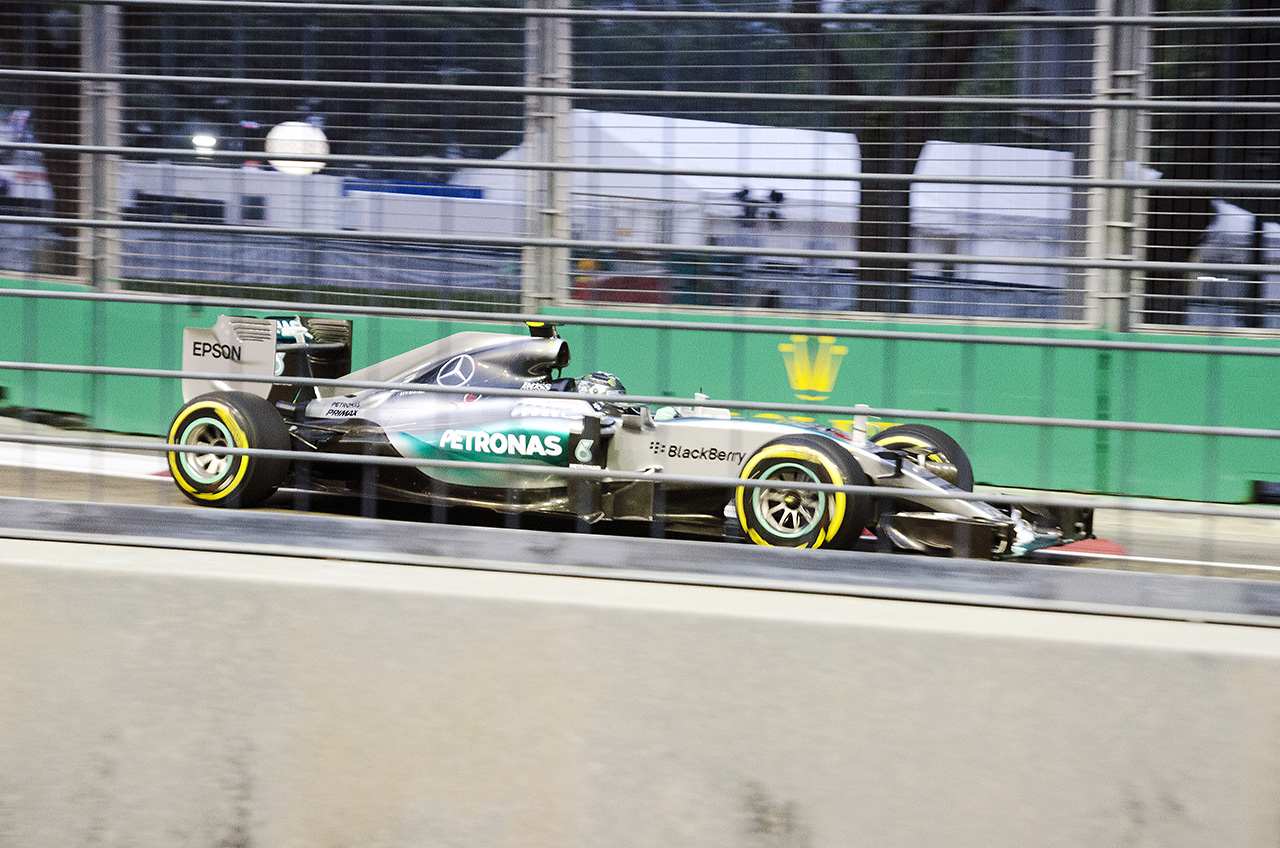
Nico Rosberg was fourth for Mercedes.

Still during the race, the stewards handed Nico Hülkenberg a three-place grid penalty for the following race in Japan for causing the collision with Felipe Massa on lap 14. Hülkenberg was "frustrated" with the decision, saying: "The accident with Felipe was very unlucky and I don't understand why I've been given a penalty before there has even been the chance to discuss the incident in the stewards' room [...] In my view it was my corner and I'm surprised Felipe backed out of it much too late, locking up just before he hit me." Massa had a different view about the incident, stating: "I was braking for the corner and he turned his car in on mine, leaving me with nowhere to go, so we hit." Force India decided not to appeal the decision. Williams's Head of Vehicle Performance Rob Smedley lamented the slow pit stop of his team that preceded the incident, saying that Massa should have exited the pit lane safely ahead of Hülkenberg. While initial reactions in the United Kingdom agreed with the stewards' decision, German tabloid Bild called the penalty a "joke". Hülkenberg later accepted that he was at fault and apologised to Massa via text message. Concerning the accident between Button and Maldonado, no further action was taken by the stewards. Jenson Button however followed up on his "mental"-remark during the race, by stating that he felt Maldonado's driving was "very strange" and that he "won't ever change". Maldonado answered by saying: "No driver's happy if there's a car in front of them and they want to get past, especially if it damages their car trying to overtake [...]. We both got damage to our cars; he was behind me trying to get past, I was defending my position. That's racing."

Following the controversial refusal by Max Verstappen to follow team orders and let his teammate pass in the final lap of the race, team principal Franz Tost later backed up his driver: "The team wanted to swap positions because we thought Carlos was faster with the new tyres, but this was not the case, he could not catch up. He was too far away, so Max said no, and he was right." The Ferrari team came under criticism after the race, when team personnel broke through a barrier by security to enter parc fermé and celebrate Vettel's victory. The team announced that they intended to "send a written unconditional apology" to the Grand Prix officials and security staff over the incident.

As a result of the race, Hamilton's lead in the Drivers' Championship was cut down to 41 points, with Rosberg still in second place. Sebastian Vettel moved closer as well, now being 49 points behind Hamilton. Felipe Massa's retirement saw him drop from fourth to sixth in the standings, being overtaken by both Räikkönen and Bottas. In the Constructors' Championship, Ferrari closed the gap to leaders Mercedes, now trailing 310 to 463 points. This race would prove to be the only one that Lewis Hamilton did not finish in the season.

== Classification ==
=== Qualifying ===
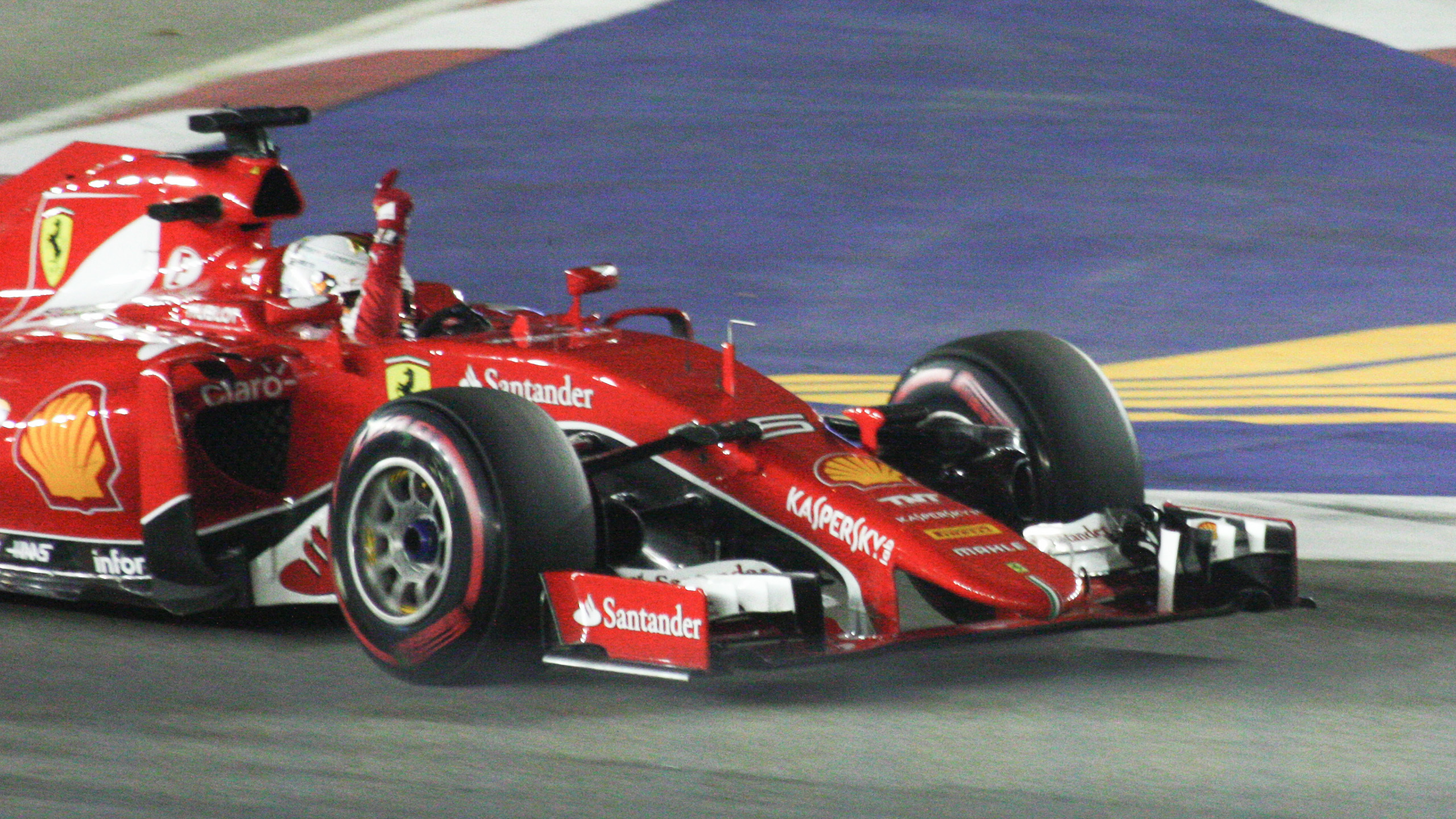
Sebastian Vettel celebrates taking pole position.

Pos.	Car no.	Driver	Constructor	Qualifying times			Final grid
Pos.	Car no.	Driver	Constructor	Q1	Q2	Q3	Final grid
1	5	(Germany) Sebastian Vettel	Ferrari	1:46.017	1:44.743	1:43.885	1
2	3	(Australia) Daniel Ricciardo	Red Bull Racing-Renault	1:46.166	1:45.291	1:44.428	2
3	7	(Finland) Kimi Räikkönen	Ferrari	1:46.467	1:45.140	1:44.667	3
4	26	(Russia) Daniil Kvyat	Red Bull Racing-Renault	1:45.340	1:44.979	1:44.745	4
5	44	(United Kingdom) Lewis Hamilton	Mercedes	1:45.765	1:45.650	1:45.300	5
6	6	(Germany) Nico Rosberg	Mercedes	1:46.201	1:45.653	1:45.415	6
7	77	(Finland) Valtteri Bottas	Williams-Mercedes	1:46.231	1:45.887	1:45.676	7
8	33	(Netherlands) Max Verstappen	Toro Rosso-Renault	1:46.483	1:45.635	1:45.798	8
9	19	(Brazil) Felipe Massa	Williams-Mercedes	1:46.879	1:45.701	1:46.077	9
10	8	(France) Romain Grosjean	Lotus-Mercedes	1:46.860	1:45.805	1:46.413	10
11	27	(Germany) Nico Hülkenberg	Force India-Mercedes	1:46.669	1:46.305		11
12	14	(Spain) Fernando Alonso	McLaren-Honda	1:46.600	1:46.328		12
13	11	(Mexico) Sergio Pérez	Force India-Mercedes	1:46.576	1:46.385		13
14	55	(Spain) Carlos Sainz Jr.	Toro Rosso-Renault	1:46.465	1:46.894		14
15	22	(United Kingdom) Jenson Button	McLaren-Honda	1:46.891	1:47.019		15
16	12	(Brazil) Felipe Nasr	Sauber-Ferrari	1:46.965			16
17	9	(Sweden) Marcus Ericsson	Sauber-Ferrari	1:47.088			17
18	13	(Venezuela) Pastor Maldonado	Lotus-Mercedes	1:47.323			18
19	28	(United Kingdom) Will Stevens	Marussia-Ferrari	1:51.021			19^{1}
20	53	(United States) Alexander Rossi	Marussia-Ferrari	1:51.523			20^{2}
107% time: 1:52.713

Notes

- ^1 – Will Stevens received a five-place grid penalty for an unscheduled gearbox change, but remained 19th due to Rossi's identical penalty.
- ^2 – Alexander Rossi received a five-place grid penalty for an unscheduled gearbox change.

=== Race ===
Pos.	No.	Driver	Constructor	Laps	Time/Retired	Grid	Points
1	5	(Germany) Sebastian Vettel	Ferrari	61	2:01:22.118	1	25
2	3	(Australia) Daniel Ricciardo	Red Bull Racing-Renault	61	+1.478	2	18
3	7	(Finland) Kimi Räikkönen	Ferrari	61	+17.154	3	15
4	6	(Germany) Nico Rosberg	Mercedes	61	+24.720	6	12
5	77	(Finland) Valtteri Bottas	Williams-Mercedes	61	+34.204	7	10
6	26	(Russia) Daniil Kvyat	Red Bull Racing-Renault	61	+35.508	4	8
7	11	(Mexico) Sergio Pérez	Force India-Mercedes	61	+50.836	13	6
8	33	(Netherlands) Max Verstappen	Toro Rosso-Renault	61	+51.450	8	4
9	55	(Spain) Carlos Sainz Jr.	Toro Rosso-Renault	61	+52.860	14	2
10	12	(Brazil) Felipe Nasr	Sauber-Ferrari	61	+1:30.045	16	1
11	9	(Sweden) Marcus Ericsson	Sauber-Ferrari	61	+1:37.507	17	
12	13	(Venezuela) Pastor Maldonado	Lotus-Mercedes	61	+1:37.718	18	
13^{1}	8	(France) Romain Grosjean	Lotus-Mercedes	59	Gearbox	10	
14	53	(United States) Alexander Rossi	Marussia-Ferrari	59	+2 Laps	20	
15	28	(United Kingdom) Will Stevens	Marussia-Ferrari	59	+2 Laps	19	
Ret	22	(United Kingdom) Jenson Button	McLaren-Honda	52	Gearbox	15	
Ret	14	(Spain) Fernando Alonso	McLaren-Honda	33	Gearbox	12	
Ret	44	(United Kingdom) Lewis Hamilton	Mercedes	32	Power unit	5	
Ret	19	(Brazil) Felipe Massa	Williams-Mercedes	30	Gearbox	9	
Ret	27	(Germany) Nico Hülkenberg	Force India-Mercedes	12	Collision^{2}	11	

Notes

- ^1 – Romain Grosjean was classified despite retiring due to completing 90% of the race distance.
- ^2 – Nico Hülkenberg was penalised with a three-place grid penalty at the Japanese Grand Prix for causing the collision with Massa.

== Championship standings after the race ==
- Bold text and an asterisk indicates who still had a mathematical chance of becoming World Champion.

Drivers' Championship standings

	Pos.	Driver	Points
	1	(United Kingdom) Lewis Hamilton*	252
	2	(Germany) Nico Rosberg*	211
	3	(Germany) Sebastian Vettel*	203
1	4	(Finland) Kimi Räikkönen*	107
1	5	(Finland) Valtteri Bottas	101

Constructors' Championship standings

Pos.	Constructor	Points
1	(Germany) Mercedes*	463
2	(Italy) Ferrari*	310
3	(United Kingdom) Williams-Mercedes	198
4	(Austria) Red Bull Racing-Renault	139
5	Force India-Mercedes	69

- Note: Only the top five positions are included for both sets of standings.

== See also ==
- 2015 TCR International Series Singapore round

Previous race: 2015 Italian Grand Prix	FIA Formula One World Championship; 2015 season	Next race: 2015 Japanese Grand Prix
Previous race: 2014 Singapore Grand Prix	Singapore Grand Prix	Next race: 2016 Singapore Grand Prix
