= 2015 Italian Grand Prix =

2015 Formula 1 race

Race 12 of 19 in the 2015 Formula One World Championship
← Previous race	Next race →
- Layout of the Autodromo Nazionale di Monza

Race details
- Date: 6 September 2015
- Official name: Formula 1 Gran Premio d'Italia 2015
- Location: Autodromo Nazionale di Monza; Monza, Italy
- Course: Permanent racing facility
- Course length: 5.793 km (3.600 miles)
- Distance: 53 laps, 306.720 km (190.587 miles)
- Weather: Partly cloudy 22–23 °C (72–73 °F) air temperature 38–39 °C (100–102 °F) track temperature 1.5 m/s (4.9 ft/s) wind from changing directions
- Attendance: 154,000 (Weekend) 80,000 (Race Day)

Pole position
Driver	(United Kingdom) Lewis Hamilton	Mercedes
- Time: 1:23.397

Fastest lap
Driver	(United Kingdom) Lewis Hamilton	Mercedes
- Time: 1:26.672 on lap 48

Podium
First	(United Kingdom) Lewis Hamilton	Mercedes
Second	(Germany) Sebastian Vettel	Ferrari
Third	(Brazil) Felipe Massa	Williams-Mercedes

The 2015 Italian Grand Prix (formally known as the Formula 1 Gran Premio d'Italia 2015) was a Formula One motor race held on 6 September 2015 at the Autodromo Nazionale di Monza in Monza, Italy. The race was the twelfth round of the 2015 season, and marked the 85th running of the Italian Grand Prix.

Lewis Hamilton of Mercedes was the defending race winner, and entered with a 28-point lead over teammate Nico Rosberg in the Drivers' Championship, with Sebastian Vettel a further 39 points behind. Mercedes lead the Constructors' Championship by 184 points over Ferrari, with Williams a further 81 points behind in third.

Hamilton completed the second grand slam of his career by winning the race, taking pole position, setting the fastest lap and leading every lap of the race. He finished 25 seconds ahead of Vettel, while Felipe Massa finished third for Williams. Rosberg retired with three laps to go due to an engine failure, resulting in Hamilton extending his lead in the Drivers' Championship to 53 points. Hamilton's victory was confirmed a few hours after the race following an investigation from race stewards after it was discovered that the left-rear tyre on his Mercedes was below Pirelli's recommended minimum tyre pressure standards in a random check but due to procedural inconsistencies, no sanctions were imposed against either Mercedes driver or the team.

This race marked the 41st and final podium finish for 2008 World Championship runner-up Felipe Massa and, as of 2026, the most recent podium achieved for a Brazilian driver in Formula One.

== Report ==
=== Background ===
Tyre supplier Pirelli brought its white-banded medium compound tyre as the harder "prime" tyre and the yellow-banded soft compound as the softer "option" compound, as opposed to the previous year where the company brought the hard compound as the prime and medium compound as the option. Sauber's Head of Track Engineering, Giampaolo Dallara, praised the updated choice, summing up that it will challenge teams to make time in the corners in addition to going for pure top speed, putting on a better show for the fans. However, Pirelli had received criticism from several drivers and commentators following tyre failures on Nico Rosberg's and Sebastian Vettel's cars at the Belgian Grand Prix. Prior to the Italian Grand Prix, Formula One commercial rights holder Bernie Ecclestone called for the drivers to keep their concerns to themselves, saying: "We're not going to let them [Pirelli] go. They're doing a good job."

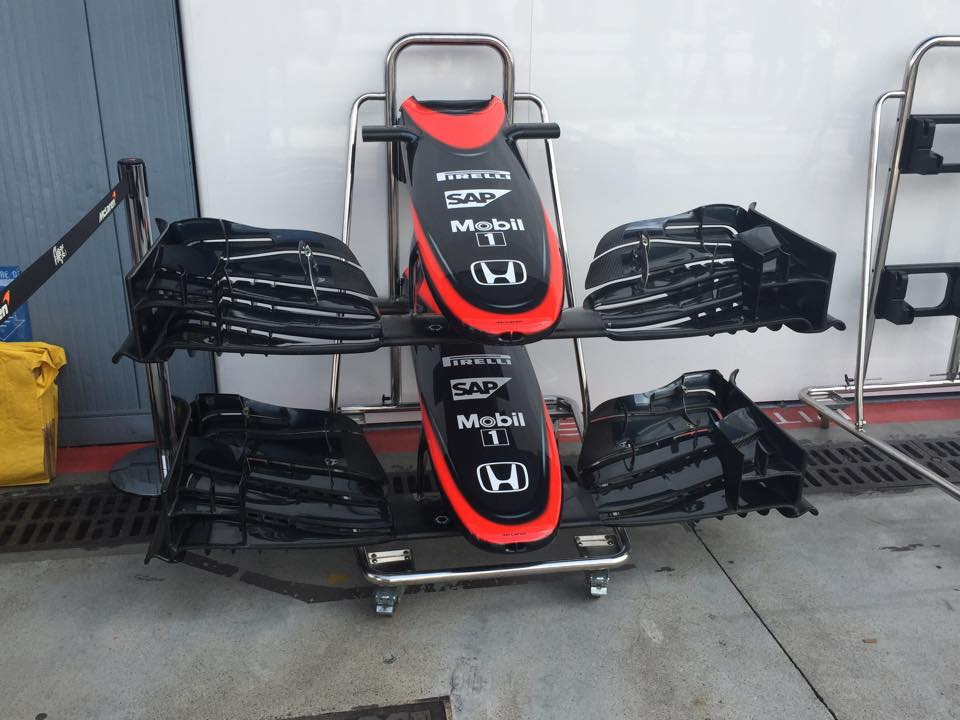
McLaren reintroduced their snub noses for the race.

The Lotus team, who had their cars impounded by bailiffs following Belgium two weeks earlier, managed to get their cars back in time for the Grand Prix. Despite their financial troubles, the team said it had enough funds for the rest of the season. Meanwhile, contract negotiations were high in the agenda prior to the weekend, with Williams announcing that the team would retain Felipe Massa and Valtteri Bottas for 2016, while Nico Hülkenberg signed a new two-year deal with Force India. An additional talking point was the future of the Italian Grand Prix at Monza, with the event at risk to be dropped from the calendar. After the race, Ferrari driver Sebastian Vettel spoke out in favour of the venue, saying: "If we take this race away from the calendar for any shitty money reasons, you are basically ripping our hearts out".

In terms of technical developments, Ferrari upgraded their engine for their home race by using three of their development tokens while Mercedes spent all seven of their remaining engine tokens. As a result of this, Mercedes became the first team in 2015 to use all their tokens, with both Honda and Ferrari having four tokens remaining and Renault having twelve tokens left for later in the season. Because of these changes both Mercedes cars were on their third powerplants, whilst both Ferrari cars were on their fourth power units. Additionally, Toro Rosso, Red Bull and McLaren received grid penalties for exceeding their parts usage, forcing them to start at the back of the grid. McLaren went back to using their snub nose design, which they had replaced earlier in the season ahead of the Austrian Grand Prix, in order to achieve better aerodynamics and lower drag for the high-speed Monza circuit.

Prior to the race, Lewis Hamilton was leading the World Championship on 227 points, 28 clear of teammate Rosberg. Sebastian Vettel was in third place, another 39 points adrift. In the Constructors' standings, Mercedes were in front on 426 points, with Ferrari and Williams second and third on 242 and 161 points respectively. This race was Scuderia Ferrari's 900th start in a World Championship event as a team.

=== Free practice ===
Per the regulations for the 2015 season, three practice sessions were held; there were two 90-minute sessions on Friday and another one-hour session before qualifying on Saturday. In what The Guardian described as an "as dominant as ever" performance, Mercedes and Lewis Hamilton led the times in both practice sessions on Friday, with Nico Rosberg in second on both occasions. During the first session on Friday morning, Hamilton led his teammate by half a second, with Sebastian Vettel in third, another full second behind. Daniel Ricciardo was the fastest driver in a Renault-powered car, and trailed Hamilton by more than two seconds. Jolyon Palmer again replaced Romain Grosjean in the Lotus during the first practice and ended the session half a second off his teammate's pace in fifteenth. Carlos Sainz Jr. briefly brought out a red flag when he got stuck in the gravel after spinning out at Parabolica.

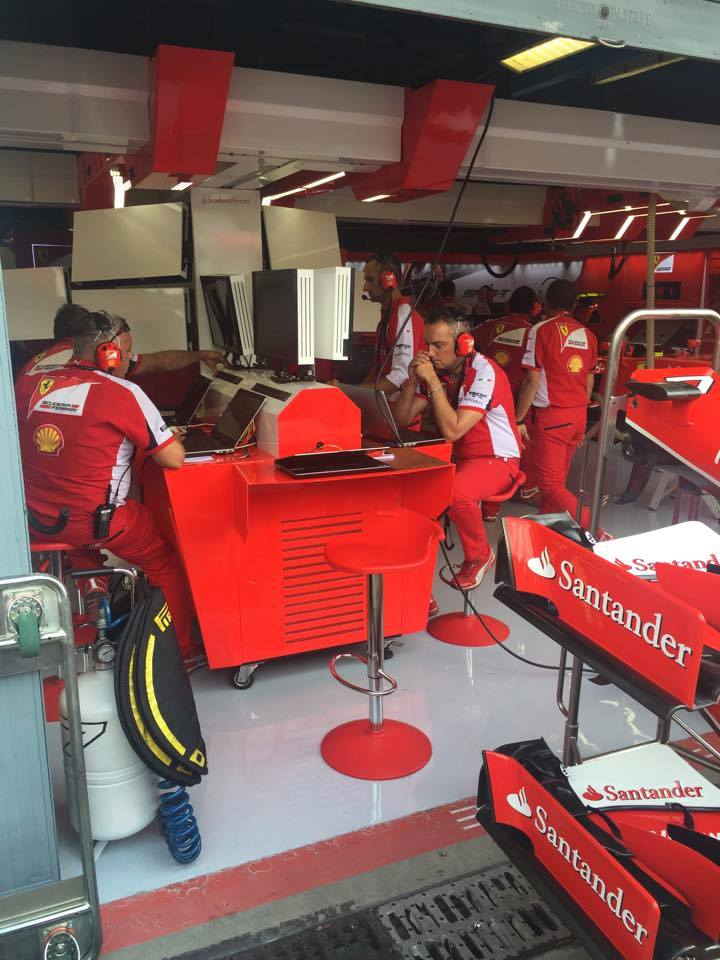
A view into the Ferrari garage on Saturday

At the second practice session on Friday afternoon, Ferrari was able to reduce the gap to Mercedes, with Vettel third a little more than seven-tenths of a second behind Hamilton. Nico Rosberg was just 0.021 seconds off his teammate's time of 1m24.279s, even leading through the first two sectors but losing fastest time through the third and final sector. The two Force India cars of Sergio Pérez and Nico Hülkenberg split the two Ferrari drivers, with Kimi Räikkönen finishing in sixth. Max Verstappen was the second Toro Rosso driver of the day to spin out into the gravel, but he was able to continue after losing control of his car at the Ascari chicane. There were technical problems for both Daniel Ricciardo and Jenson Button. While the Australian had to cut his first run short due to a hydraulical issue, Button was summoned back into the pit lane after only three laps with an unspecified problem.

In the third session on Saturday morning, Lewis Hamilton once more finished fastest, but this time it was Sebastian Vettel in second, 0.264s behind Hamilton's time of 1m24.544s. The session started on a slightly wet track caused by rain over the night, but it soon dried up. Ricciardo's session was marred by another technical problem, this time an engine failure to his newly equipped power unit. His teammate Daniil Kvyat did not have a productive session either as he spent most of the time in the garage, setting only seventeenth best time.

=== Qualifying ===
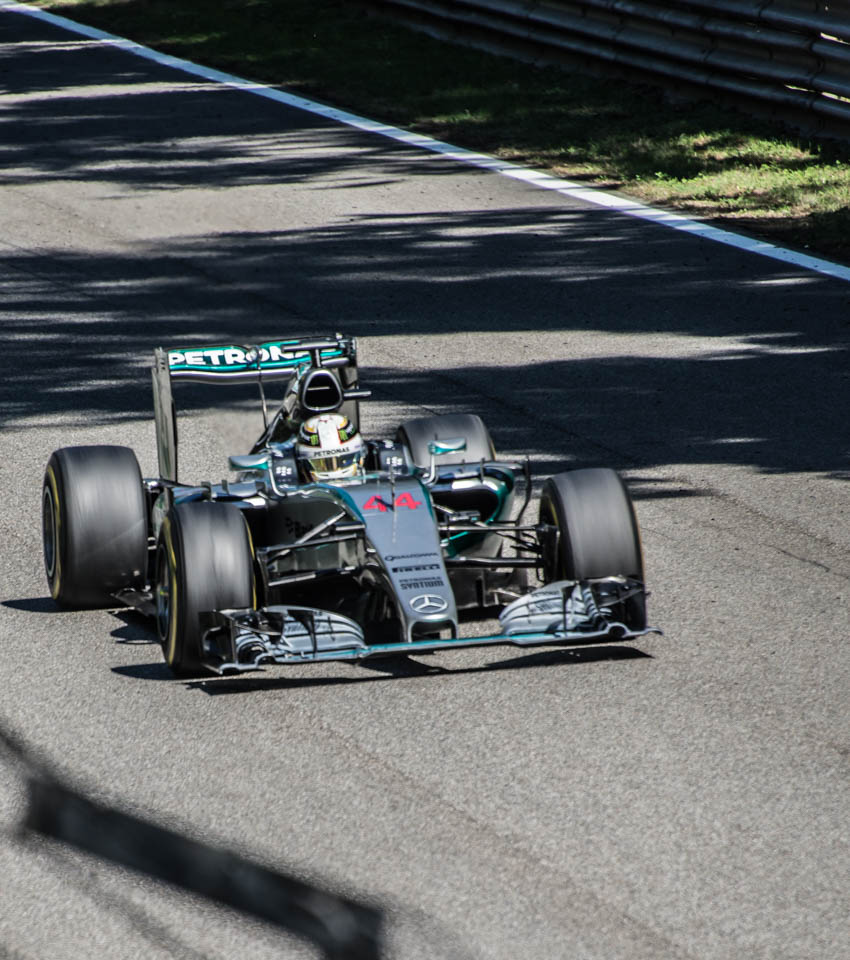
Lewis Hamilton qualified on pole position and went on to win the race.

Qualifying consisted of three parts, 18, 15 and 12 minutes in length respectively, with five drivers eliminated from competing after each of the first two sessions. Before qualifying began on Saturday afternoon, Mercedes was forced to change the power unit in Nico Rosberg's car back to the one used in Belgium, which had already run for six full races, after finding an issue with the new specification unit. Meanwhile, Lotus was forced to borrow tyre blankets from other teams, as their own had been rendered unusable by rain during the night. When the session began, Nico Hülkenberg was one of the first out on track, but his fast lap was disrupted by Marcus Ericsson, who was later penalised for the incident. Both Daniel Ricciardo and Max Verstappen spent most of the session in the pit lane. While Ricciardo was able to get out and set a lap sufficient to see him proceed to the second part of qualifying (Q2), Verstappen went out only to see his engine cover blown off at Curva Grande, scattering the track with debris, though at the very end of the session, so no other cars were affected. Next to Verstappen, both Manor Marussia and McLaren drivers were eliminated.

During the first timed runs in Q2, Lewis Hamilton was seven-tenths of a second quicker than teammate Rosberg, while the Ferrari cars split the pair to place provisional second and third. Nevertheless, both Mercedes drivers did not go out again. Sebastian Vettel set a second timed lap to improve his time, now a little more than a tenth behind Hamilton. Many drivers only set one timed lap towards the end of the session, with Pastor Maldonado, Felipe Nasr, Carlos Sainz Jr. and Daniil Kvyat unable to move on into Q3, while Ricciardo did not set a time, leaving him fifteenth for the time being.

When Q3 was contested by the top ten drivers, Nico Rosberg was the first to set a time, but Hamilton immediately went faster, setting a time of 1:23.397, which eventually secured him pole position. Again, both Ferrari drivers went faster than Rosberg, being about three-tenths of a second behind Hamilton. During the last timed runs, Räikkönen moved ahead of Vettel to qualify on the front row, while Rosberg improved his time, but stayed in fourth on the grid. He would later refer to his old power unit as the main reason for his qualifying performance. Nico Hülkenberg posted a time good enough for ninth, but his car came to a halt at the pit lane entrance, after his team had miscalculated the fuel put into his car. The two Williams of Massa and Bottas qualified fifth and sixth respectively, with Hülkenberg's teammate Pérez behind them in seventh, ahead of Romain Grosjean. Marcus Ericsson rounded up the top ten, but was later dropped to twelfth on the grid for impeating Hülkenberg in Q1. It was Hamilton's eleventh pole position in twelve races in the season so far.

Toro Rosso's Max Verstappen was handed a drive-through penalty to be served within the first three laps of the race due to an unsafe pit release during qualifying. Kimi Räikkönen expressed delight with his front row performance, saying that the team was surprised by the strong result and calling it "our best qualifying of the year as a team".

=== Race ===
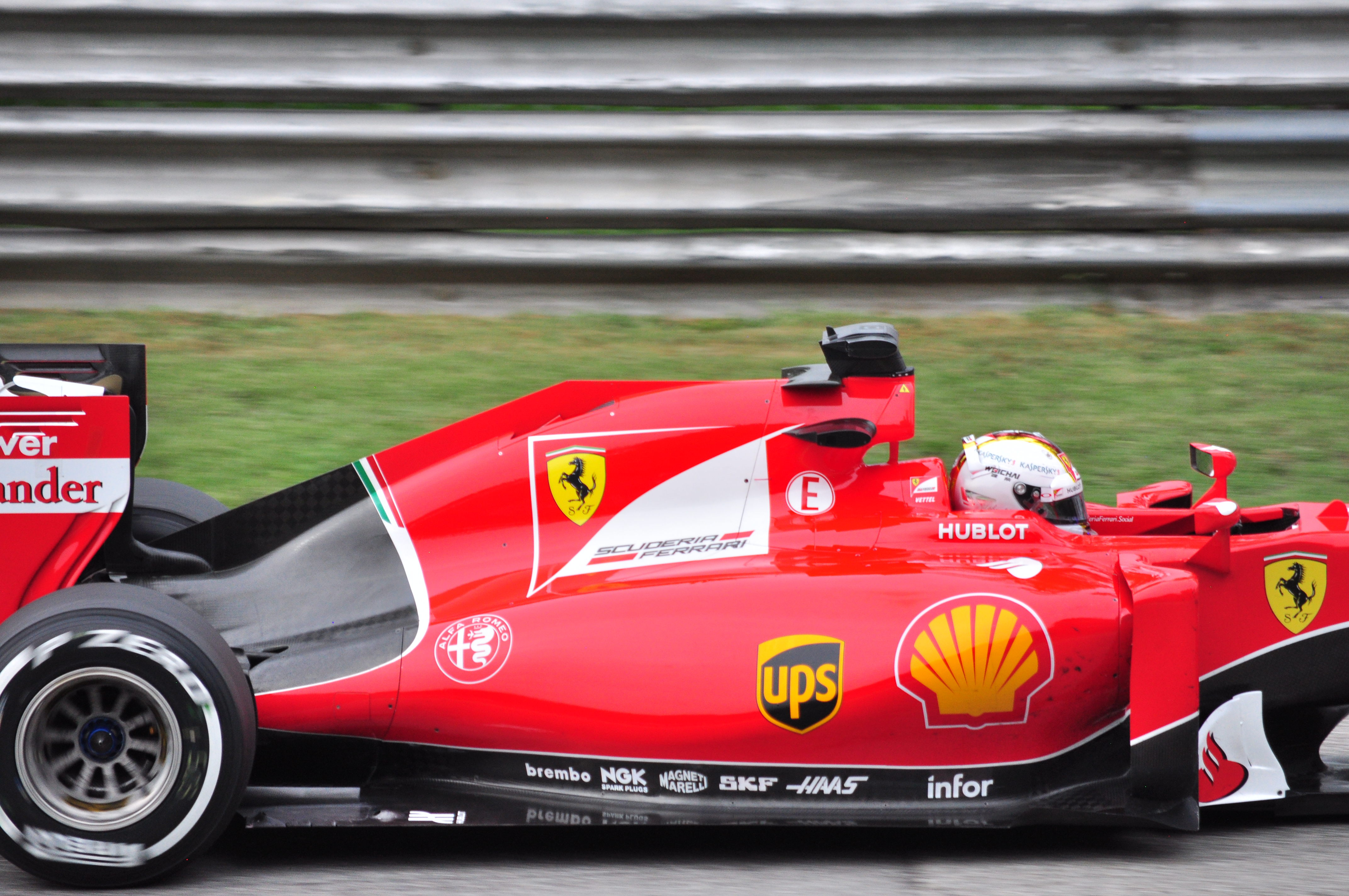
Sebastian Vettel finished second for Ferrari.

As the race got under way, Kimi Räikkönen's Ferrari remained motionless on the spot and only started after all other cars had passed the Finn. Meanwhile, Hamilton got through the first chicane in front of Vettel, but his teammate Rosberg had to avoid Räikkönen's car and lost two places to the two Williams of Felipe Massa and Valtteri Bottas. Both Lotus drivers were forced to retire before the end of the second lap, Grosjean due to contact with another car, while Maldonado damaged his chassis when he went over a kerb. While Räikkönen charged through the field to get back up to twelfth place by lap three, Lewis Hamilton quickly increased his advantage over Vettel and moved out of the one-second DRS window. Nico Rosberg was unable to pass Bottas on track and was told by his team to cool his brakes. Further back, the Red Bull sponsored cars moved up the order as well, with Carlos Sainz Jr., Daniel Ricciardo and Daniil Kvyat fighting for tenth position. Sainz yielded his place on lap 11, when he needed to go into the pit lane for a five-second penalty handed to him for cutting the chicane at the start. By lap 14, Hamilton led Vettel by over eight seconds, with Rosberg still behind both Williams in fifth place, pushing Bottas by enabling DRS on the long straights. Behind the German were the two Force India cars of Sergio Pérez and Nico Hülkenberg.

On lap 18, Rosberg was the first of the front runners to come in, attempting to "undercut" the two Williams, who were forced to pit shortly after. Massa came in a lap later and Bottas on lap 22, both emerging from the pit lane behind the Mercedes of Rosberg, who was now third. By lap 26, both Hamilton and Vettel had made pit stops as well, as Hamilton was leading the Ferrari by more than twelve seconds. By that point, Räikkönen, who had yet to stop, was in third place but easily overtaken by Rosberg on lap 28. On lap 29, Daniel Ricciardo, also still on his original tyres, moved past Pérez into sixth position, only for the Mexican to retrieve it a lap later. At the end of lap 29, Räikkönen made a pit stop but almost collided with Roberto Merhi at the pit entrance. After his stop, the Finn emerged tenth, but quickly moved up the order again, taking eighth from Marcus Ericsson on lap 32. By lap 36, Nico Rosberg had moved within four seconds of Sebastian Vettel in front of him, while Räikkönen moved into seventh at the expense of Nico Hülkenberg.

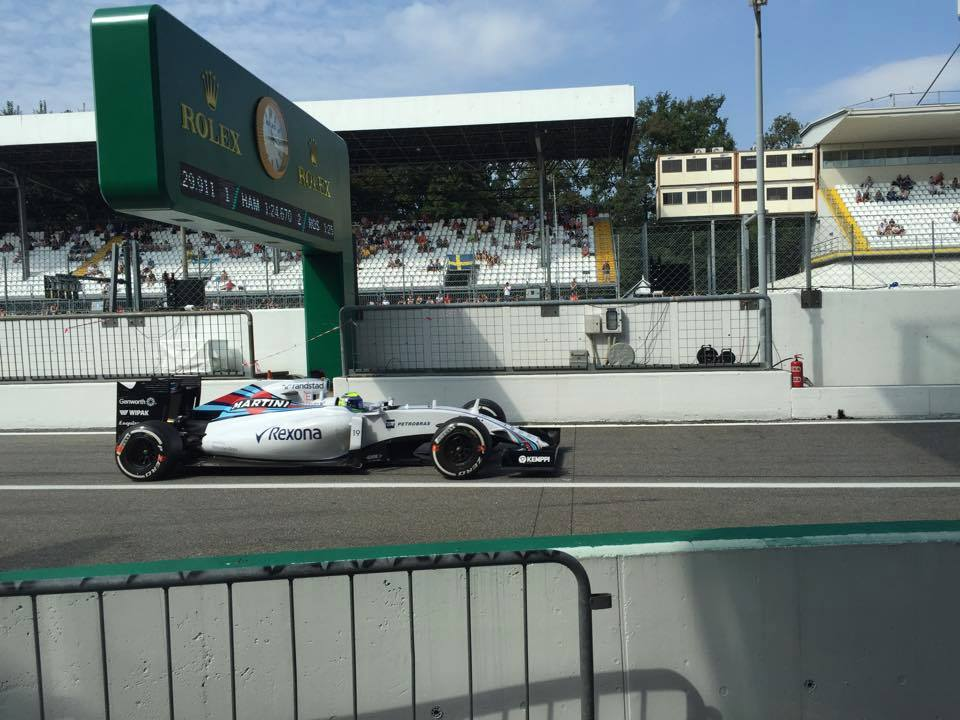
Felipe Massa finished third for Williams.

By lap 45, Vettel and Rosberg encountered backmarkers on track, which allowed Rosberg to move closer to his compatriot, trailing him by less than three seconds. On lap 49, Mercedes told Hamilton to increase his speed, without giving the driver an explanation. With Hamilton leading Vettel by 23 seconds, the call came unexpected. It later proved to be caused by the fact that Hamilton's left rear tyre had too little pressure at the start, leading the team to fear for a time penalty after the race. Fernando Alonso retired from the race on lap 50 due to loss of power. One lap later, Räikkönen moved into sixth place by overtaking the Force India of Sergio Pérez. With one lap to go, Rosberg was moving ever closer to Vettel in front, when his engine failed, forcing him to retire, handing Felipe Massa the final spot on the podium, who defended the position from teammate Bottas over the final lap. Lewis Hamilton finished the race to take victory on what he himself described as "the best [weekend] I've ever driven". He finished more than 25 seconds ahead of Vettel with a grand slam of pole position, fastest lap, win, and every lap led and thus the unofficial title of super grand slam for leading the three practice sessions as well as the three qualifying sessions in the same racing weekend.

=== Post-race ===
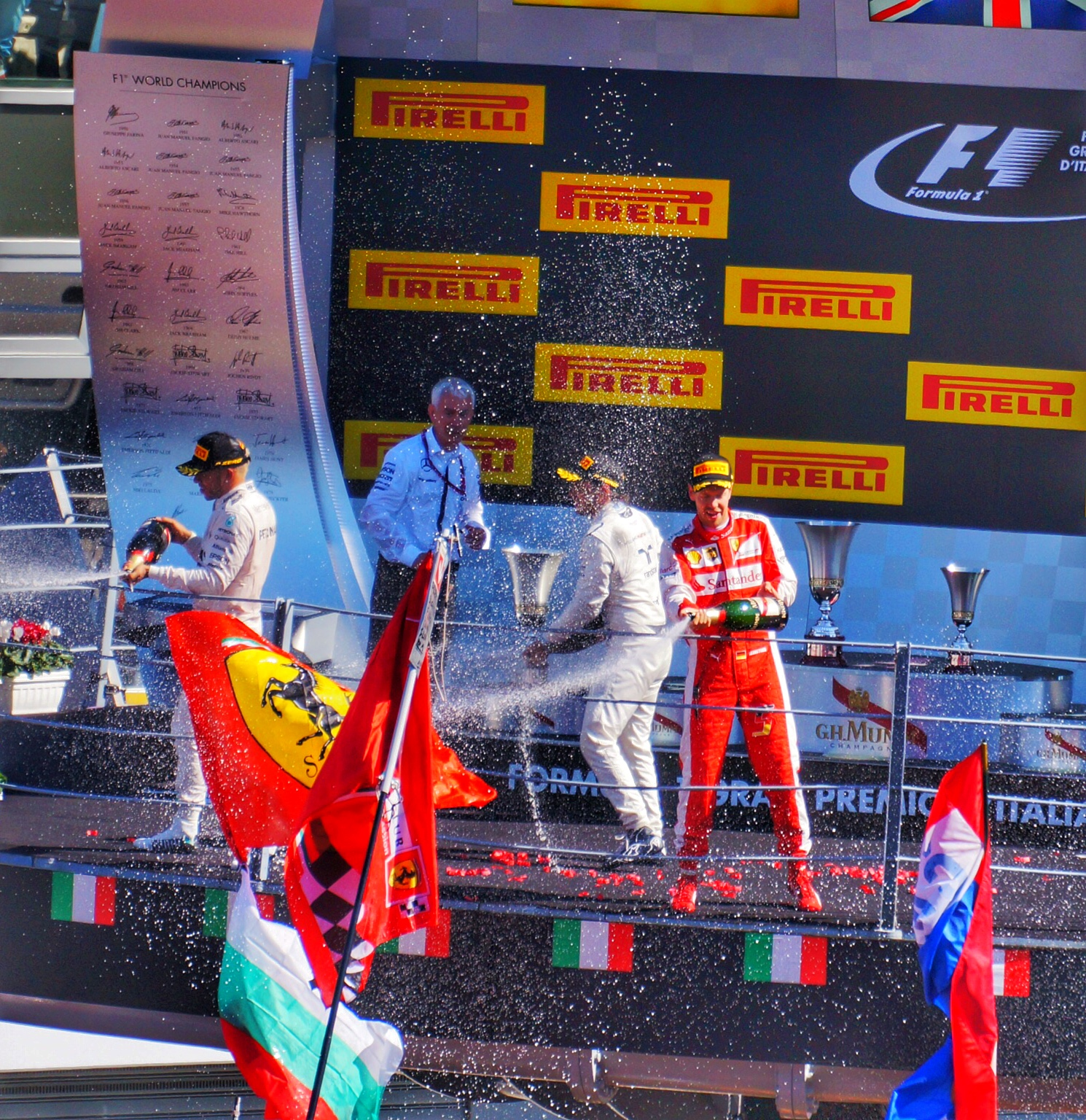
The podium celebrations

For more than two hours after the race, Hamilton's victory was still up for debate, as his left rear tyres was found to have had 0.3 psi less tyre pressure than regulated. While Lewis Hamilton stated in the post-race press conference that he had not been aware of the issue, Williams officials Pat Symonds and Rob Smedley called for Hamilton's disqualification, with the latter pointing out that it was "a safety issue". The stewards eventually decided not to take any further action, stating the following: "In making this determination regarding the pressure, the stewards noted that the tyre warming blankets had been disconnected from their power source, as is normal procedure, and the tyres were significantly below the maximum permitted tyre blanket temperature at the time of the FIA's measurement on the grid and at significantly different temperatures from other cars measured on the grid. Further, the stewards are satisfied that the team followed the currently specified procedure, supervised by the tyre manufacturer for the safe operation of the tyres. Therefore, the stewards decide to take no further action."

At the podium interview, conducted by film director George Lucas, Lewis Hamilton expressed gratitude to his team and the fans at the venue. Felipe Massa, asked about his last lap fight with teammate Bottas, stated: "I'm getting old for that! I even said to the team I'm getting old! The last three laps of the race I was fighting with my team-mate. It was very difficult but we managed to be here." During the post-race press conference, Hamilton expressed surprise over his championship lead, since he had not been made aware of Rosberg's retirement at that point. When asked about the tyre pressure issue, Sebastian Vettel defended Hamilton, saying: "I think it's not fair to hand that question to Lewis because he doesn't know what's going on [...]. In a lot of respect and fairness he did a very good job today and you have to accept that."

Following the race, Red Bull team principal Christian Horner said that Mercedes had made a "worrying step forward" with their new engine specification, admitting that the team was "in a league of their own at the moment". Nico Rosberg, who had raced with the old specification version of the power unit, described the race as a "massive step in the wrong direction". After the race, the team revealed that they had turned his engine up in order to help him catch Vettel in the closing stages. The team later admitted that using the new power unit at the Italian Grand Prix had been "a risk".

As a result of the race, Lewis Hamilton extended his lead in the championship to 53 points over teammate Rosberg. His second-place finish meant that Sebastian Vettel moved closer to Rosberg, now trailing him by 21 points. In the Constructors' Championship, Mercedes now led the field on 451 points, with Ferrari and Williams in second and third, on 270 and 188 points respectively.

== Classification ==
=== Qualifying ===
Pos.	Car no.	Driver	Constructor	Qualifying times			Final grid
Pos.	Car no.	Driver	Constructor	Q1	Q2	Q3	Final grid
1	44	(United Kingdom) Lewis Hamilton	Mercedes	1:24.251	1:23.383	1:23.397	1
2	7	(Finland) Kimi Räikkönen	Ferrari	1:24.662	1:23.757	1:23.631	2
3	5	(Germany) Sebastian Vettel	Ferrari	1:24.989	1:23.577	1:23.685	3
4	6	(Germany) Nico Rosberg	Mercedes	1:24.609	1:23.864	1:23.703	4
5	19	(Brazil) Felipe Massa	Williams-Mercedes	1:25.184	1:23.983	1:23.940	5
6	77	(Finland) Valtteri Bottas	Williams-Mercedes	1:24.979	1:24.313	1:24.127	6
7	11	(Mexico) Sergio Pérez	Force India-Mercedes	1:24.801	1:24.379	1:24.626	7
8	8	(France) Romain Grosjean	Lotus-Mercedes	1:25.144	1:24.448	1:25.054	8
9	27	(Germany) Nico Hülkenberg	Force India-Mercedes	1:24.937	1:24.510	1:25.317	9
10	9	(Sweden) Marcus Ericsson	Sauber-Ferrari	1:25.122	1:24.457	1:26.214	12^{1}
11	13	(Venezuela) Pastor Maldonado	Lotus-Mercedes	1:25.429	1:24.525		10
12	12	(Brazil) Felipe Nasr	Sauber-Ferrari	1:25.121	1:24.898		11
13	55	(Spain) Carlos Sainz Jr.	Toro Rosso-Renault	1:25.410	1:25.618		17^{2}
14	26	(Russia) Daniil Kvyat	Red Bull Racing-Renault	1:25.742	1:25.796		18^{3}
15	3	(Australia) Daniel Ricciardo	Red Bull Racing-Renault	1:25.633	no time		19^{4}
16	22	(United Kingdom) Jenson Button	McLaren-Honda	1:26.058			15^{5}
17	14	(Spain) Fernando Alonso	McLaren-Honda	1:26.154			16^{6}
18	28	(United Kingdom) Will Stevens	Marussia-Ferrari	1:27.731			13
19	98	(Spain) Roberto Merhi	Marussia-Ferrari	1:27.912			14
107% time: 1:30.148
—	33	(Netherlands) Max Verstappen	Toro Rosso-Renault	no time			20^{7}

Notes

- ^1 – Marcus Ericsson received a 3-spot grid penalty for impeding Nico Hülkenberg, but only dropped two places due to the penalty incurred by Sainz.
- ^2 – Carlos Sainz Jr. received a 35-place grid penalty for an assortment of changes to his power unit.
- ^3 – Daniil Kvyat received a 35-place grid penalty for an assortment of changes to his power unit.
- ^4 – Daniel Ricciardo received a 50-place grid penalty for an assortment of changes to his power unit.
- ^5 – Jenson Button received a 5-place grid penalty for changing to his ninth ICU, but moved up one place due to more severe penalties incurred by other drivers.
- ^6 – Fernando Alonso received a 10-place grid penalty for changing to his ninth ICU, but moved up one place due to more severe penalties incurred by other drivers.
- ^7 – Max Verstappen received a 30-place grid penalty for an assortment of changes to his power unit, which provisionally placed him in the 17th position. However, he further failed to set a qualifying time within 107%, but was allowed to start in the final grid spot by the stewards.

=== Race ===
Pos.	No.	Driver	Constructor	Laps	Time/Retired	Grid	Points
1	44	(United Kingdom) Lewis Hamilton	Mercedes	53	1:18:00.688	1	25
2	5	(Germany) Sebastian Vettel	Ferrari	53	+25.042	3	18
3	19	(Brazil) Felipe Massa	Williams-Mercedes	53	+47.635	5	15
4	77	(Finland) Valtteri Bottas	Williams-Mercedes	53	+47.996	6	12
5	7	(Finland) Kimi Räikkönen	Ferrari	53	+1:08.860	2	10
6	11	(Mexico) Sergio Pérez	Force India-Mercedes	53	+1:12.783	7	8
7	27	(Germany) Nico Hülkenberg	Force India-Mercedes	52	+1 Lap	9	6
8	3	(Australia) Daniel Ricciardo	Red Bull Racing-Renault	52	+1 Lap	19	4
9	9	(Sweden) Marcus Ericsson	Sauber-Ferrari	52	+1 Lap	12	2
10	26	(Russia) Daniil Kvyat	Red Bull Racing-Renault	52	+1 Lap	18	1
11	55	(Spain) Carlos Sainz Jr.	Toro Rosso-Renault	52	+1 Lap	17	
12	33	(Netherlands) Max Verstappen	Toro Rosso-Renault	52	+1 Lap	20	
13	12	(Brazil) Felipe Nasr	Sauber-Ferrari	52	+1 Lap	11	
14	22	(United Kingdom) Jenson Button	McLaren-Honda	52	+1 Lap	15	
15	28	(United Kingdom) Will Stevens	Marussia-Ferrari	51	+2 Laps	13	
16	98	(Spain) Roberto Merhi	Marussia-Ferrari	51	+2 Laps	14	
17^{1}	6	(Germany) Nico Rosberg	Mercedes	50	Engine	4	
18^{1}	14	(Spain) Fernando Alonso	McLaren-Honda	47	Electrical	16	
Ret	8	(France) Romain Grosjean	Lotus-Mercedes	1	Collision damage	8	
Ret	13	(Venezuela) Pastor Maldonado	Lotus-Mercedes	1	Collision damage	10	

Notes

- ^1 – Nico Rosberg and Fernando Alonso were both classified as they had completed 90% of the race distance.

== Championship standings after the race ==
Drivers' Championship standings

	Pos.	Driver	Points
	1	(United Kingdom) Lewis Hamilton	252
	2	(Germany) Nico Rosberg	199
	3	(Germany) Sebastian Vettel	178
1	4	(Brazil) Felipe Massa	97
1	5	(Finland) Kimi Räikkönen	92

Constructors' Championship standings

	Pos.	Constructor	Points
	1	(Germany) Mercedes	451
	2	(Italy) Ferrari	270
	3	(United Kingdom) Williams-Mercedes	188
	4	(Austria) Red Bull Racing-Renault	113
1	5	Force India-Mercedes	63
Sources:

- Note: Only the top five positions are included for both sets of standings.

== See also ==
- 2015 Monza GP2 Series round
- 2015 Monza GP3 Series round

Previous race: 2015 Belgian Grand Prix	FIA Formula One World Championship; 2015 season	Next race: 2015 Singapore Grand Prix
Previous race: 2014 Italian Grand Prix	Italian Grand Prix	Next race: 2016 Italian Grand Prix
