= 2015 Brazilian Grand Prix =

Race 18 of 19 in the 2015 Formula One World Championship
← Previous race	Next race →
- Layout of the Autódromo José Carlos Pace

Race details
- Date: 15 November 2015
- Official name: Formula 1 Grande Prêmio; Petrobras do Brasil 2015
- Location: Autódromo José Carlos Pace, São Paulo, Brazil
- Course: Permanent racing facility
- Course length: 4.309 km (2.677 miles)
- Distance: 71 laps, 305.909 km (190.083 miles)
- Weather: Dry; 22–28 °C (72–82 °F) air temperature 38–48 °C (100–118 °F) track temperature 2.5 m/s (8.2 ft/s) wind from the north

Pole position
Driver	(Germany) Nico Rosberg	Mercedes
- Time: 1:11.282

Fastest lap
Driver	(United Kingdom) Lewis Hamilton	Mercedes
- Time: 1:14.832 on lap 51

Podium
First	(Germany) Nico Rosberg	Mercedes
Second	(United Kingdom) Lewis Hamilton	Mercedes
Third	(Germany) Sebastian Vettel	Ferrari

The 2015 Brazilian Grand Prix (formally known as the Formula 1 Grande Prêmio Petrobras do Brasil 2015) was a Formula One motor race held at the Autódromo José Carlos Pace in São Paulo, Brazil on 15 November 2015. It was the eighteenth race of the 2015 FIA Formula One World Championship, and marked the 44th running of the Brazilian Grand Prix as a round of the World Championship since its inception in 1950.

Nico Rosberg, driving for Mercedes, was the defending race winner. His teammate Lewis Hamilton entered the race as World Drivers' Champion, having secured the title two races earlier in the United States. Mercedes had also already clinched the Constructors' title, having done so at the 2015 Russian Grand Prix.

Rosberg took pole position in Saturday's qualifying session, the 21st of his career. He would go on to win the race from his teammate with Sebastian Vettel completing the podium for Scuderia Ferrari.

== Report ==
=== Background ===
After the 2014 race had been held at a resurfaced circuit, causing the teams to fight with the soft tyre choice by Pirelli, speculations arose if drivers would be able to challenge the eleven-year old track record set by Rubens Barrichello in 2004. However, practice showed that lap times actually slowed due to changes to the kerbs, forcing the drivers to stay away from the insides of the corners. Pirelli chose the soft and medium compounds for the event.

In the wake of the terrorist attacks in Paris on the Friday evening of the race weekend, Formula One decided to honour the victims with all drivers wearing black armbands during the parade lap on race day as well as the French tricolore being displayed on the truck that took the drivers around the track. French driver Romain Grosjean had already worn an armband with the flag of his country during Saturday's sessions. However, a long planned minute of silence for the World Day of Remembrance for Road Traffic Victims was upheld and plans to dedicate the salute to the Paris attacks discarded.

After passing on using Renault's new power unit in the United States and Mexico, Red Bull equipped Daniel Ricciardo's car with the new specification unit, which earned him a ten-place grid penalty in the process. Once he had tried the new unit during the free practice and qualifying sessions, Ricciardo lamented that the upgrade had not improved the performance. He said: "In hindsight, it didn't give us any laptime, it's just for now a penalty for a little bit of knowledge." During the first practice session on Friday, Mercedes tried out what was dubbed a "S-duct", a vent to channel airflow through the nose of the car, a feature already seen at other cars over the course of the season. However, Mercedes decided not to run the device over the whole weekend.

Going into the weekend Lewis Hamilton and his Mercedes team had already secured their respective World Championships. Fellow Mercedes driver Nico Rosberg was second in the Drivers' Championship, 21 points ahead of Ferrari's Sebastian Vettel. The two were followed by Finns Valtteri Bottas (Williams) and Kimi Räikkönen (Ferrari), three points apart from each other, with Felipe Massa another six points behind in sixth. In the Constructors' standings, Ferrari was second on 374 points, followed by Williams with 243 points.

=== Free practice ===
Per the regulations for the 2015 season, three practice sessions were scheduled, two 1.5-hour sessions on Friday and another one-hour session before qualifying on Saturday. Lewis Hamilton was fastest in the first session on Friday morning, setting a time of 1:13.543, more than half a second clear of his teammate Nico Rosberg, who was second fastest. Sebastian Vettel and Daniel Ricciardo in third and fourth respectively were the only other drivers to lap inside one second of Hamilton. The session was held in dry conditions, albeit earlier reports had indicated that thunderstorms could interrupt the weekend. Hamilton set his fastest time on the medium compound, but was caught out twice on other laps, locking up and running wide in the Senna S. In the later parts of the session, he also complained about a "weird" feeling clutch, but returned to the track soon after. Kimi Räikkönen, who was fifth fastest, spun out ten minutes before the end of the session, while eighth-placed Max Verstappen had done the same early in the session at turn three. Jolyon Palmer replaced Romain Grosjean at Lotus, finishing twelfth fastest.

It was Hamilton's teammate and defending race winner Rosberg who topped the time sheets at the second session on Friday afternoon, setting a 1:12.385 lap time. He led Hamilton by almost half a second, with the two Ferrari cars of Vettel and Räikkönen about a second adrift. Slight rain saw most drivers head out early, but the conditions never became wet enough to require intermediate tyres. After starting on the medium compound tyres, many drivers switched to the softer compound for race simulations, only for the session to be red flagged shortly after when Fernando Alonso spun at turn four, only to pull over at the side of the road with smoke coming from his car some corners later. Valtteri Bottas was sixth fastest, behind Daniel Ricciardo, suffering a spin at turn nine.

Despite several problems during the third session on Saturday morning, Lewis Hamilton was fastest, setting a time of 1:12.070, just over a tenth of a second in front of his teammate. Earlier in the session, he needed to return to pit lane due to a gear-selection problem which had caused him to temporarily stop on track and later spun at turn eleven. Vettel was again third fastest, more than six-tenths of a second behind Hamilton. He was followed by teammate Räikkönen, Valtteri Bottas and Nico Hülkenberg in the Force India, all more than a second slower than Hamilton.

=== Qualifying ===
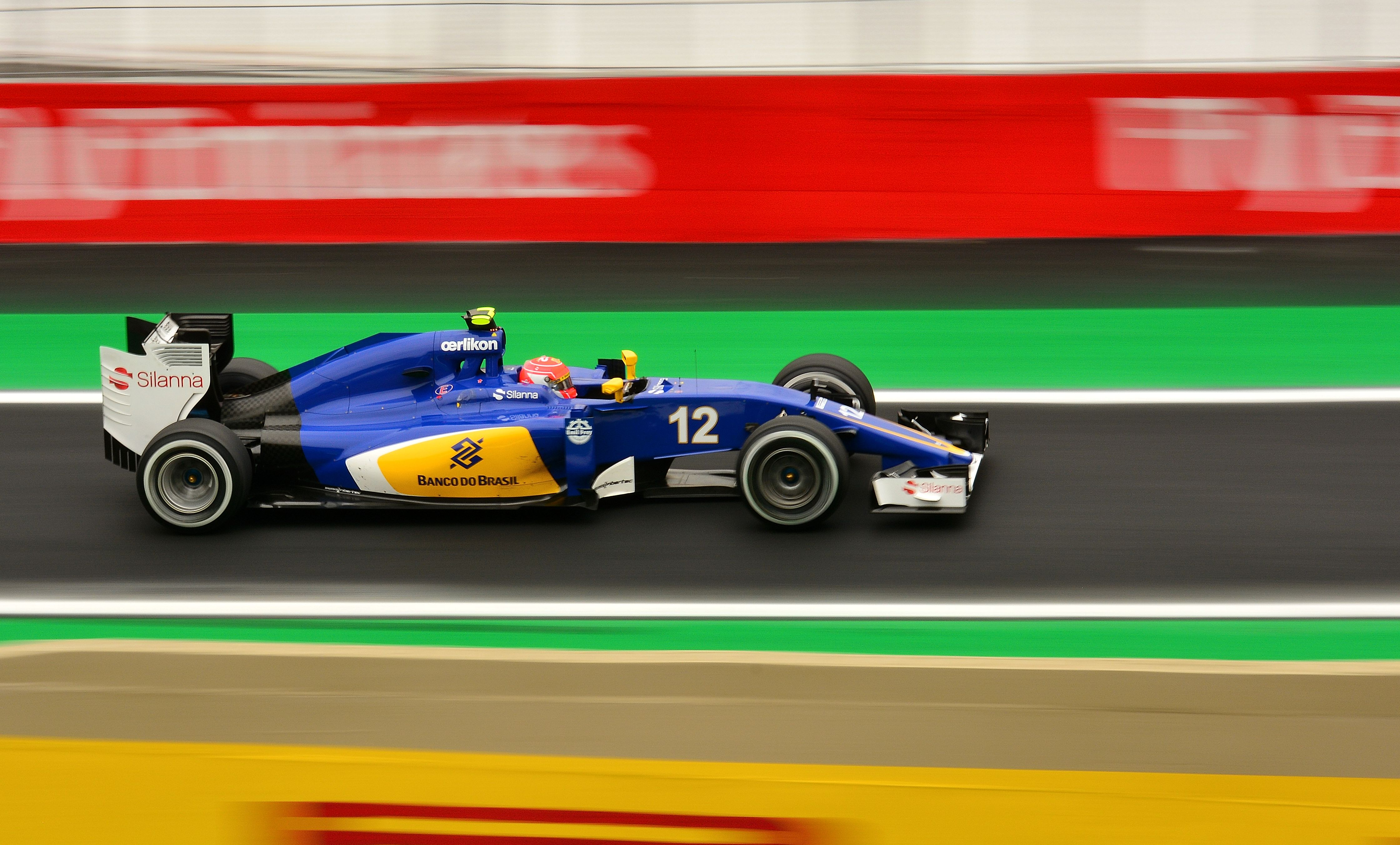
Local driver Felipe Nasr was penalised after qualifying for impeding compatriot Felipe Massa.

Qualifying consisted of three parts, 18, 15 and 12 minutes in length respectively, with five drivers eliminated from competing after each of the first two sessions. During the first part of qualifying, all drivers used the softer compound tyres at least for their second run of timed laps, including the Mercedes pair. While Valtteri Bottas was the last driver to switch from the medium tyres, his Williams teammate Felipe Massa needed a quick lap at the end of the session to secure his participation in the second qualifying round, after he had been held up by compatriot Felipe Nasr earlier in the session. Fernando Alonso's McLaren broke down due to a loss of power before he was able to set a time, with teammate Jenson Button likewise unable to proceed. Both Manor Marussia drivers failed to advance, while Pastor Maldonado in fifteenth was the last driver to be eliminated.

During the second part, the Mercedes drivers set only one run of timed laps as they were able to save their tyres for the race, well clear of the competition. Lewis Hamilton was fastest, half a second ahead of Rosberg, with Sebastian Vettel between the two. Romain Grosjean was eliminated after a spin at turn six. He was joined on the sidelines by both Saubers, Carlos Sainz Jr. and Sergio Pérez.

When the top ten drivers took to the track for the third and final part of qualifying, Nico Rosberg was able to beat his teammate Hamilton to pole position by 0.078 seconds, securing his fifth pole in a row. Third was Sebastian Vettel, ahead of Bottas, who would be demoted three places due to a penalty. Following a mistake on his last timed lap, Kimi Räikkönen finished fifth fastest, ahead of Nico Hülkenberg. Albeit racing with an updated power unit, Daniel Ricciardo qualified slower than teammate Daniil Kvyat, and a ten-place grid penalty for the change left him nineteenth on the grid.

=== Race ===
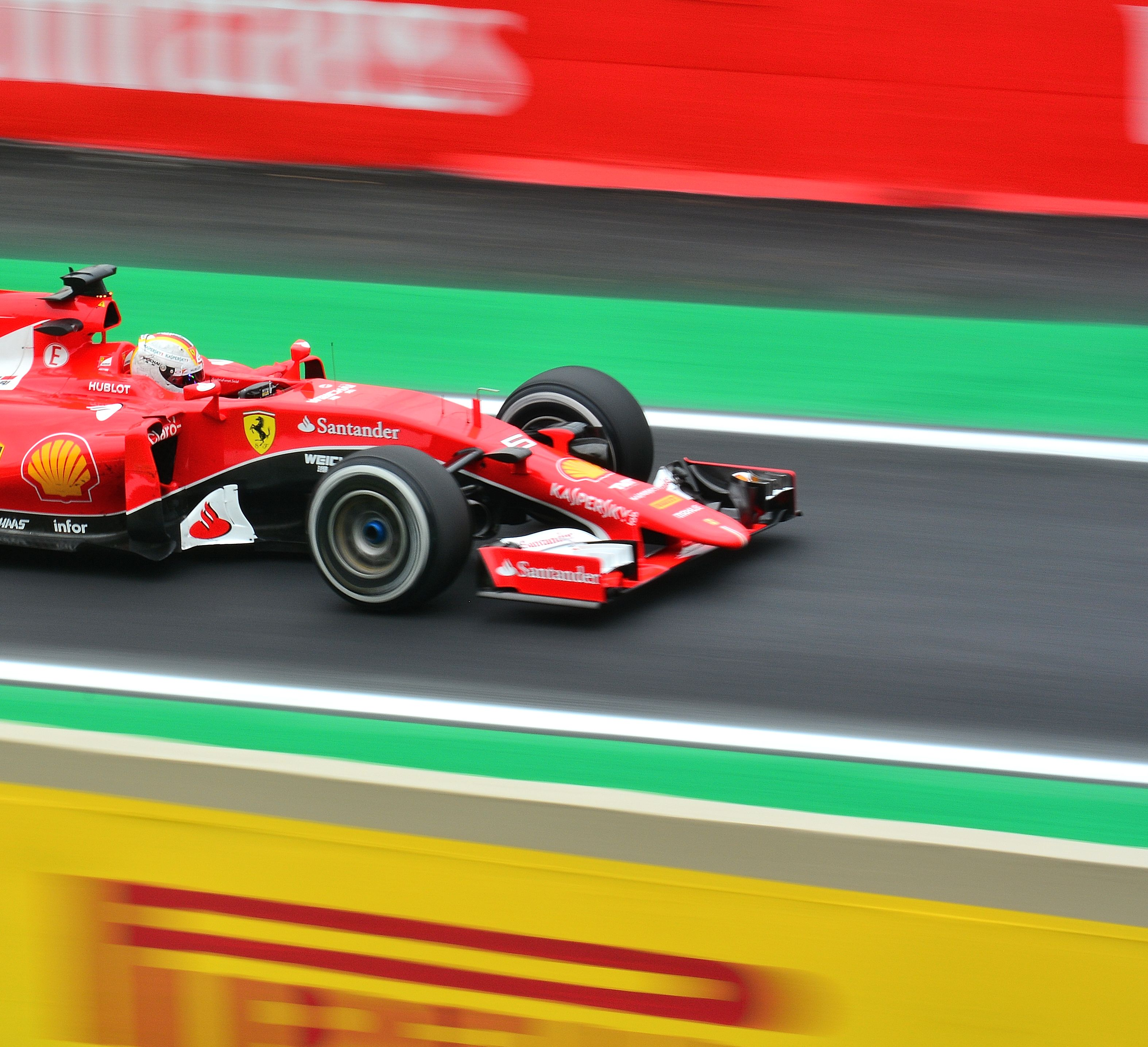
Sebastian Vettel finished third for Ferrari.

On his way to the starting grid, Carlos Sainz Jr. stopped on track and had to be pushed back to pit lane, where he eventually started, only to retire after just a few hundred metres. At the start, both Mercedes drivers got away well and Hamilton tried to overtake Rosberg for the lead around the outside of the first corner, but were unable to do so. Jenson Button made a good start, moving from 16th to 13th, while Marcus Ericsson fell from 13th to 18th. Behind the leaders, the Ferrari drivers retained third and fourth place respectively. Bottas moved into fifth after moving around the outside. Hamilton was able to follow Rosberg closely in the opening laps, while Daniel Ricciardo was the first driver to pit for new tyres on lap four. One lap later, Grosjean was able to use drag reduction system (DRS) to overtake Felipe Nasr for eleventh. With his back row start and an early pit stop, Ricciardo overtook the two Manor Marussia cars around lap nine.

Regular pit stops started on lap eleven, with Massa, Kvyat, Pérez and Grosjean being the first to come in. In addition, Nico Hülkenberg made a pit stop and exited ahead of both Massa and Kvyat, who both had been in front of him before their respective stops. Bottas came in a lap later and maintained position. Kimi Räikkönen, who had been complaining about lack of grip in his front tyres, made a pit stop on lap 13. Race leader Rosberg came in for his tyre change on lap fourteen, simultaneously with Vettel, while Hamilton stayed out for another lap. He was ultimately unable to use his additional lap to come out in front of his teammate and remained second. On lap 18, Nico Hülkenberg, who was suffering from an unstable car, overtook Maldonado for sixth place. Around lap 20, Hamilton was moving closer to Rosberg, being in DRS range for multiple laps before reporting to the garage that his tyres would not last long and eased up. On lap 22, Kvyat moved ahead of Maldonado as well and was now seventh. Lap 24 witnessed Massa go around Maldonado as well, while Felipe Nasr overtook Button for 14th.

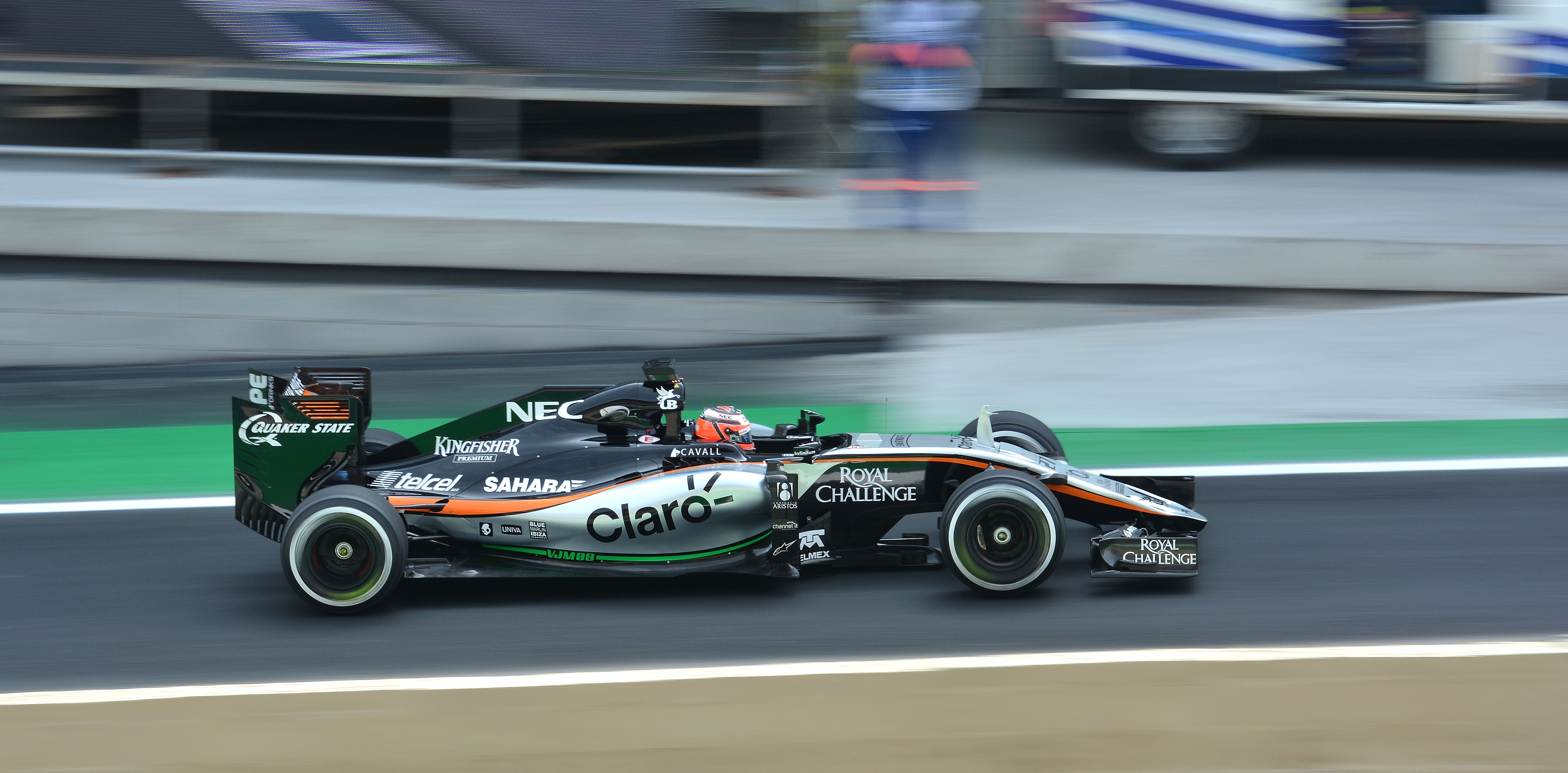
Stopping just twice, Nico Hülkenberg finished in sixth place.

Daniel Ricciardo was the first driver to pit for a second time on lap 30. At the same time, a three-way fight had emerged for ninth place, with Pérez in front of Grosjean and Verstappen. On lap 32, Verstappen moved ahead of Grosjean and took another position from Pérez, who in turn lost another place to Grosjean in the same manoeuvre. Vettel made a pit stop for a second time on lap 33, prompting Rosberg to follow suit one lap later. Hamilton briefly held the lead, but made a pit stop as well soon after, emerging to set a new fastest lap of the race albeit emerging behind both Ferrari cars. Lap 36 saw a collision between Pastor Maldonado and Marcus Ericsson, but both drivers were able to continue the race. Two laps later, Maldonado was in another fight for position with the other Sauber of Felipe Nasr, moving ahead. He ultimately received a five-second penalty for his part in the incident with Ericsson.

By lap 43, Romain Grosjean had managed to overtake Verstappen for tenth place. Hamilton started to lose ground on Rosberg, trailing him by 3.4 seconds on lap 44; however, he managed to close the gap in the succeeding laps. Kimi Räikkönen put in his second stop on lap 47, followed by Vettel's third just one lap later, with Rosberg reacting and changing tyres as well. Hamilton changed tyres on lap 50, and went on to set the fastest lap of the race one lap later. On lap 53, Massa moved ahead of Grosjean into eighth place, but was already reported under investigation for his pre-race tyre temperatures at that point. After serving his penalty, Maldonado managed to overtake Nasr for ninth place on lap 57. Nasr, who was utilizing a two-stop strategy, struggled with his tyres and fell back behind Ricciardo on lap 61. Ricciardo gained another position at Pérez's expense on lap 67, while Verstappen moved into tenth place one lap later, overtaking Maldonado. At the front, Hamilton's tyre started to wear off in the closing stages, enabling Rosberg to take victory 7.7 seconds ahead of his teammate.

=== Post-race ===
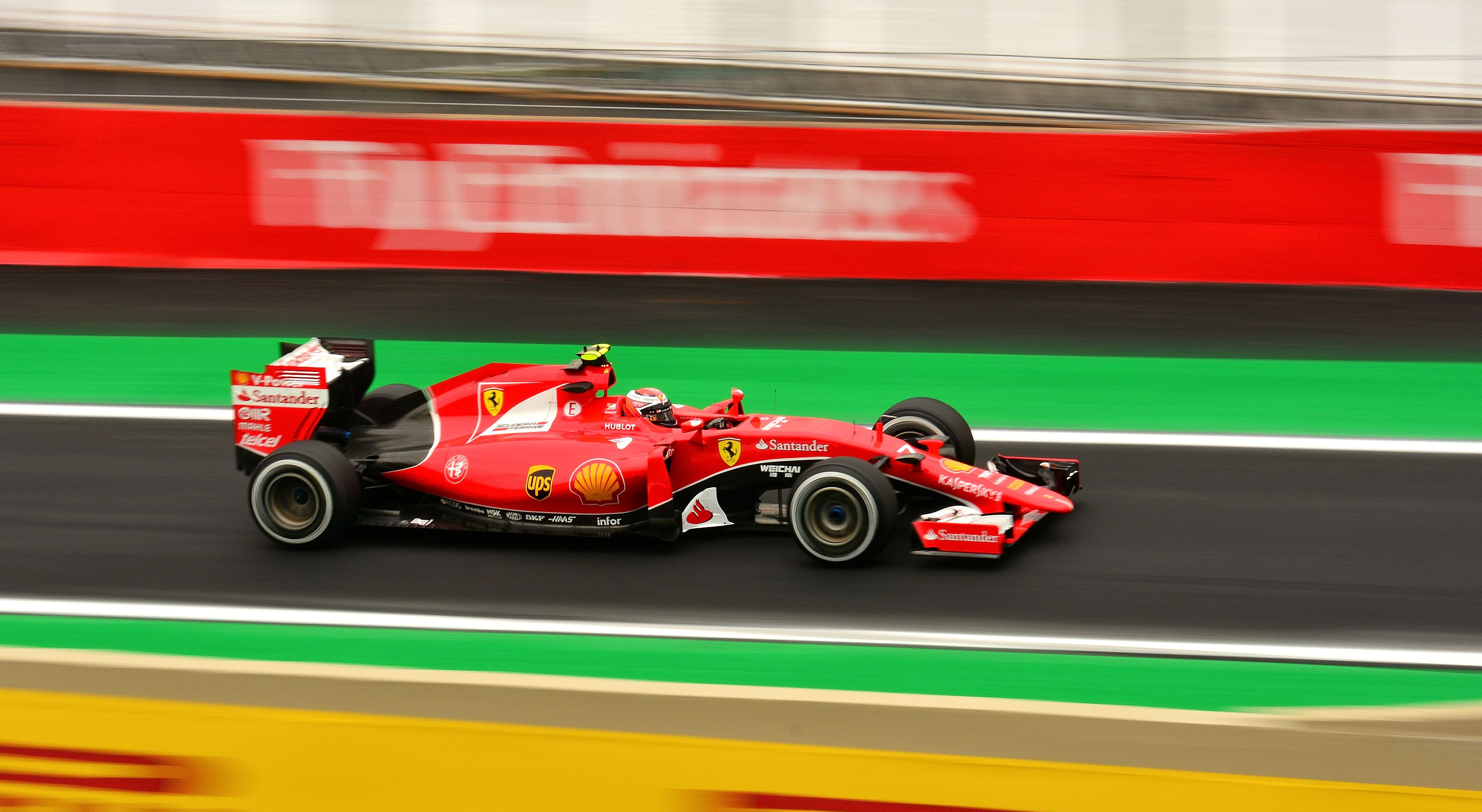
By finishing fourth, Kimi Räikkönen moved within one point of Valtteri Bottas in the Championship.

At the podium interviews, which were conducted by former Formula One driver Martin Brundle, Nico Rosberg expressed delight about his victory, but also remembered the events of Paris which, as he put it, rendered "everything relative". Replying to Brundle's notion that driving the way he did earlier in the season would have given him a chance for the championship, Rosberg replied: "Thank you very much for that piece of advice, I could figure that out for myself!" Lewis Hamilton on the other hand lamented the fact that he was unable to follow Rosberg closely on track without damaging his tyres too much, saying that he would have otherwise had the pace to pass him. Third placed Sebastian Vettel called it "a good race", but also "not very exciting", since the Ferrari drivers had been "in no-mans land" behind the Mercedes.

The main talking point after the race was Hamilton's assertion that he would have preferred to go on a different strategy compared to his teammate to have a chance of passing him, an option denied by his team. Hamilton lobbied for his team to allow the drivers to take more risks, while his team principal, Toto Wolff, insisted that the team, not the drivers, were at liberty to make calls about strategy. Opinions on the matter were divided in the following days. 1996 world champion Damon Hill shared Hamilton's frustration, saying: "I have some sympathy with what Lewis was saying, the drivers should be allowed to call the shots - and if he wants to try something different and basically zag when the other guy is zigging." Daniel Johnson, writing for The Daily Telegraph, concurred: "It was not just Hamilton's failure to win the Brazilian Grand Prix, following home an obdurate Nico Rosberg; it was the manner of it, lacking the killer move while obeying a Mercedes strategy which rendered the drivers more robots than racers."

After the race Felipe Massa was disqualified when it was discovered that his tyres were too hot at the start of the race. Pirelli stated that the highest temperature at his right rear tyre was found to be 137 °C (279 °F), while a maximum temperature of 110 °C (230 °F) was allowed. Williams announced that they would appeal the penalty. However, on 19 November 2015, Williams decided to drop the appeal, stating that since a decision was unlikely to be made before the end of the year, the matter would draw attention away from the preparations for the 2016 season. Following his collision with Marcus Ericsson, Pastor Maldonado came under criticism by Sauber team principal Monisha Kaltenborn, who called him "very annoying", pointing to the fact that Maldonado had been involved in similar situations in the past. By finishing tenth after Massa's disqualification, Maldonado scored his last point in Formula One.

Reception of the race was mainly negative. Italian newspaper Corriere dello Sport – Stadio called it "boring", while fellow Italian paper Corriere della Sera wrote of "Formula One like a sleeping pill". Sky Sports described the race as "mundane" and "soporific". Spanish newspaper Sport highlighted Max Verstappen's "spectacular" overtaking as bringing "the only colour" into the race. The Independent wrote, referring to Hamilton's desperate attempts to pass Rosberg: "If there was ever a race which confirmed that Formula One should be looking at ways to facilitate overtaking, this was it." In the wake of his experience, Hamilton called for Formula One to adjust rules to enhance overtaking, saying: "I guess for fans it's probably not too exciting to watch. Of course, it's always nice when you're at the front, as we have been for some time now - but still, being able to race is what... and also down the back, the rest of the field is probably what fans want to see. That's probably a change that would be looked positively on." Sebastian Vettel agreed, calling for more grip created by the tyres to make it easier to follow a car closely.

As a result of the race, Nico Rosberg secured second place in the Drivers' Championship ahead of Vettel. Further back, Kimi Räikkönen closed the gap to fourth placed Valtteri Bottas to just one point ahead of the final race of the season. In the Constructors' Championship, Williams and Force India secured their respective third and fifth places, with no team able to overcome them on points.

== Classification ==
=== Qualifying ===
Pos.	Car no.	Driver	Constructor	Qualifying times			Final grid
Pos.	Car no.	Driver	Constructor	Q1	Q2	Q3	Final grid
1	6	(Germany) Nico Rosberg	Mercedes	1:11.746	1:12.213	1:11.282	1
2	44	(United Kingdom) Lewis Hamilton	Mercedes	1:11.682	1:11.665	1:11.360	2
3	5	(Germany) Sebastian Vettel	Ferrari	1:12.240	1:11.928	1:11.804	3
4	77	(Finland) Valtteri Bottas	Williams-Mercedes	1:12.934	1:12.374	1:12.085	7^{1}
5	7	(Finland) Kimi Räikkönen	Ferrari	1:12.185	1:12.243	1:12.144	4
6	27	(Germany) Nico Hülkenberg	Force India-Mercedes	1:12.595	1:12.485	1:12.265	5
7	26	(Russia) Daniil Kvyat	Red Bull Racing-Renault	1:12.730	1:12.527	1:12.322	6
8	19	(Brazil) Felipe Massa	Williams-Mercedes	1:12.980	1:12.858	1:12.415	8
9	3	(Australia) Daniel Ricciardo	Red Bull Racing-Renault	1:12.639	1:12.825	1:12.417	19^{2}
10	33	(Netherlands) Max Verstappen	Toro Rosso-Renault	1:12.824	1:12.712	1:12.739	9
11	12	(Brazil) Felipe Nasr	Sauber-Ferrari	1:13.111	1:12.989		13^{3}
12	55	(Spain) Carlos Sainz Jr.	Toro Rosso-Renault	1:13.267	1:13.045		10
13	11	(Mexico) Sergio Pérez	Force India-Mercedes	1:13.140	1:13.147		11
14	9	(Sweden) Marcus Ericsson	Sauber-Ferrari	1:13.346	1:13.233		12
15	8	(France) Romain Grosjean	Lotus-Mercedes	1:13.056	1:13.913		14
16	13	(Venezuela) Pastor Maldonado	Lotus-Mercedes	1:13.385			15
17	22	(United Kingdom) Jenson Button	McLaren-Honda	1:13.425			16
18	53	(United States) Alexander Rossi	Marussia-Ferrari	1:16.151			17
19	28	(United Kingdom) Will Stevens	Marussia-Ferrari	1:16.283			18
107% time: 1:16.700
—	14	(Spain) Fernando Alonso	McLaren-Honda	no time			20^{4}

Notes:

- ^1 – Valtteri Bottas received a three-place grid penalty for overtaking Felipe Nasr under red-flag conditions in Practice Two.
- ^2 – Daniel Ricciardo was handed a ten-place grid penalty for switching to a new power unit, having already used more than the allowed number of five.
- ^3 – Felipe Nasr was given a three-place grid penalty for impeding Felipe Massa during qualifying.
- ^4 – Fernando Alonso was permitted to start the race by the stewards despite failing to set a qualifying time within the 107% limit.

=== Race ===
Pos.	No.	Driver	Constructor	Laps	Time/Retired	Grid	Points
1	6	(Germany) Nico Rosberg	Mercedes	71	1:31:09.090	1	25
2	44	(United Kingdom) Lewis Hamilton	Mercedes	71	+ 7.756	2	18
3	5	(Germany) Sebastian Vettel	Ferrari	71	+ 14.244	3	15
4	7	(Finland) Kimi Räikkönen	Ferrari	71	+ 47.543	4	12
5	77	(Finland) Valtteri Bottas	Williams-Mercedes	70	+ 1 Lap	7	10
6	27	(Germany) Nico Hülkenberg	Force India-Mercedes	70	+ 1 Lap	5	8
7	26	(Russia) Daniil Kvyat	Red Bull Racing-Renault	70	+ 1 Lap	6	6
8	8	(France) Romain Grosjean	Lotus-Mercedes	70	+ 1 Lap	14	4
9	33	(Netherlands) Max Verstappen	Toro Rosso-Renault	70	+ 1 Lap	9	2
10	13	(Venezuela) Pastor Maldonado	Lotus-Mercedes	70	+ 1 Lap	15	1
11	3	(Australia) Daniel Ricciardo	Red Bull Racing-Renault	70	+ 1 Lap	19	
12	11	(Mexico) Sergio Pérez	Force India-Mercedes	70	+ 1 Lap	11	
13	12	(Brazil) Felipe Nasr	Sauber-Ferrari	70	+ 1 Lap	13	
14	22	(United Kingdom) Jenson Button	McLaren-Honda	70	+ 1 Lap	16	
15	14	(Spain) Fernando Alonso	McLaren-Honda	70	+ 1 Lap	20	
16	9	(Sweden) Marcus Ericsson	Sauber-Ferrari	69	+ 2 Laps	12	
17	28	(United Kingdom) Will Stevens	Marussia–Ferrari	67	+ 4 Laps	18	
18	53	(United States) Alexander Rossi	Marussia–Ferrari	67	+ 4 Laps	17	
Ret	55	(Spain) Carlos Sainz Jr.	Toro Rosso-Renault	0	Technical	PL^{1}	
DSQ	19	(Brazil) Felipe Massa	Williams-Mercedes	70	Tyre temperature^{2}	8	

Notes:

- ^1 – Carlos Sainz Jr. stopped on the way to the starting grid and had to start from the pit lane. His 10th spot on the grid was left vacant.
- ^2 – Felipe Massa originally finished eighth, but was disqualified for a breach of temperature limits in his rear right tyre.

== Championship standings after the race ==
Drivers' Championship standings

Pos.	Driver	Points
1	(United Kingdom) **Lewis Hamilton**	363
2	(Germany) Nico Rosberg	297
3	(Germany) Sebastian Vettel	266
4	(Finland) Valtteri Bottas	136
5	(Finland) Kimi Räikkönen	135

Constructors' Championship standings

Pos.	Constructor	Points
1	(Germany) **Mercedes**	660
2	(Italy) Ferrari	401
3	(United Kingdom) Williams-Mercedes	253
4	(Austria) Red Bull Racing-Renault	178
5	Force India-Mercedes	120
Sources:

- Note: Only the top five positions are included for both sets of standings.
- **Bold text** indicates 2015 World Champions.

Previous race: 2015 Mexican Grand Prix	FIA Formula One World Championship; 2015 season	Next race: 2015 Abu Dhabi Grand Prix
Previous race: 2014 Brazilian Grand Prix	Brazilian Grand Prix	Next race: 2016 Brazilian Grand Prix
