= 2015 Abu Dhabi Grand Prix =

Race 19 of 19 in the 2015 Formula One World Championship
← Previous race	Next race →
- Layout of the Yas Marina Circuit

Race details
- Date: 29 November 2015
- Official name: 2015 Formula 1 Etihad Airways; Abu Dhabi Grand Prix
- Location: Yas Marina Circuit; Yas Island, Abu Dhabi, United Arab Emirates
- Course: Permanent racing facility
- Course length: 5.554 km (3.451 miles)
- Distance: 55 laps, 305.355 km (189.739 miles)
- Weather: Clear; 25–27 °C (77–81 °F) air temperature 28–29 °C (82–84 °F) track temperature 1.5 m/s (4.9 ft/s) wind from the south
- Attendance: 60,000 (Race Day)

Pole position
Driver	(Germany) Nico Rosberg	Mercedes
- Time: 1:40.237

Fastest lap
Driver	(United Kingdom) Lewis Hamilton	Mercedes
- Time: 1:44.517 on lap 44

Podium
First	(Germany) Nico Rosberg	Mercedes
Second	(United Kingdom) Lewis Hamilton	Mercedes
Third	(Finland) Kimi Räikkönen	Ferrari

The 2015 Abu Dhabi Grand Prix (formally known as the 2015 Formula 1 Etihad Airways Abu Dhabi Grand Prix) was a Formula One motor race held at the Yas Marina Circuit on 29 November 2015. The race was the nineteenth and final round of the 2015 season, and marked the seventh running of the Abu Dhabi Grand Prix as a round of the World Championship since its inception in 1950.

Lewis Hamilton was the defending race winner and had already secured his third Drivers' Championship earlier in the season at the United States Grand Prix. His team, Mercedes, had decided the Constructors' Championship in their favour at the Russian Grand Prix.

In Saturday's qualifying, Nico Rosberg (Mercedes) secured his sixth consecutive pole position and went on to win the race ahead of teammate Hamilton. Kimi Räikkönen finished third for Ferrari. It was the twelfth one-two finish for Mercedes, cementing a record-breaking season that saw them finish with the highest ever number of points scored by a constructor at 703, most front row lockouts and one-two finishes over the course of any Formula One season. This would also prove to be the last Grand Prix for Will Stevens, Roberto Merhi, and Pastor Maldonado.

== Background ==
Going into the race weekend, both Championships were already decided. Lewis Hamilton had already secured the drivers' title three races earlier at the 2015 United States Grand Prix and was leading the Drivers' Championship with 363 points, 66 points ahead of his teammate Nico Rosberg. In the Constructors' Championship, their team Mercedes had also secured the constructors' title four races earlier at the 2015 Russian Grand Prix and was leading Ferrari on 660 to 401 points. However, several positions in the standings were still undecided. In the battle for fourth place in the Drivers' Championship, Valtteri Bottas was just one point ahead of compatriot Kimi Räikkönen, with Felipe Massa in sixth also still able to get the position, being 19 points behind his Williams teammate Bottas. Red Bull teammates Daniil Kvyat and Daniel Ricciardo were just ten points apart in the battle for seventh in the championship. In the Constructors' standings, sixth placed Lotus was just nine points ahead of Toro Rosso, while McLaren needed at least nine points as well to overcome Sauber for eighth, a points tally they had only managed once during the rest of the season.

Pirelli supplied the teams with the yellow banded soft and the red banded super-soft tyres as the two dry weather options for the race. It was the 150th race for Force India under their current moniker.

== Free practice ==
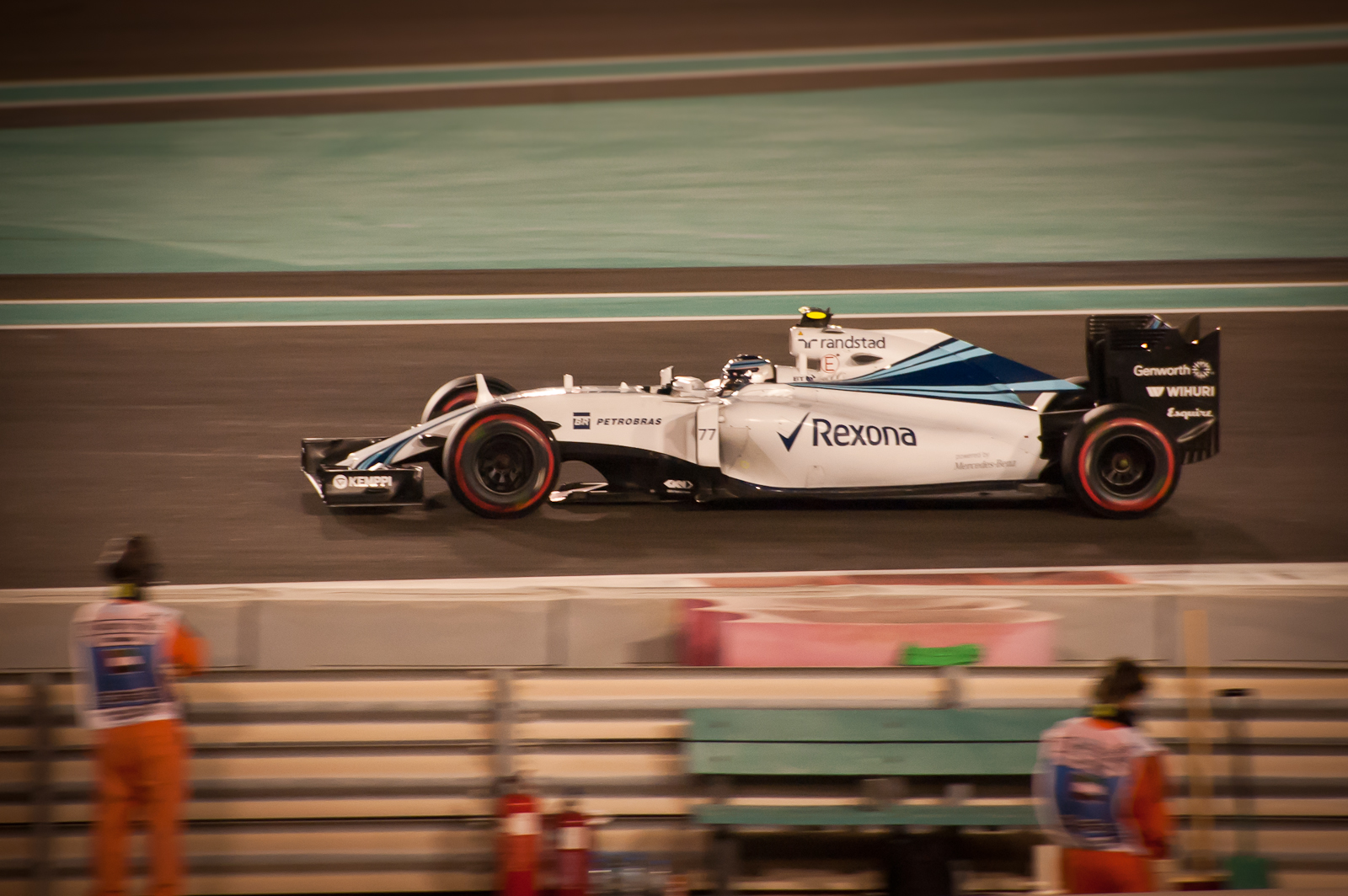
Due to local laws, Williams ran their car without the usual Martini Racing livery.

Per the regulations for the 2015 season, three practice sessions were scheduled, two 1.5-hour sessions on Friday and another one-hour session before qualifying on Saturday. Lewis Hamilton was fastest in the first free practice session, run in clear and sunny conditions, lapping in a time of 1m43.754s, over one-tenth of a second faster than teammate Rosberg in second. Rosberg had set new fastest sector times on his last fast run, but a mistake in the last part of the track lost him a chance at the best time. Kimi Räikkönen was third fastest for Ferrari, ahead of Daniil Kvyat. Kvyat's Red Bull teammate Ricciardo changed back to his older specification Renault power unit, after being unsatisfied with the performance of his updated unit at the previous race in Brazil. He finished the session seventh fastest. At Lotus, Jolyon Palmer replaced Romain Grosjean, but had to sit out most of the session due to a water leak, managing just nine laps.

In the second session of Friday afternoon, Nico Rosberg topped the timesheets, setting a time of 1m41.983s, finishing more than a tenth of a second ahead of Hamilton. Third fastest was Sergio Pérez for Force India, although he was unable to run in the last twenty minutes of the session due to brake issues. The Red Bull drivers Kvyat and Ricciardo were fourth and sixth respectively, while Fernando Alonso came within one second of Rosberg's time in ninth.

Rosberg was again fastest in the third session on Saturday with a time of 1m41.856s. Hamilton was second quickest, almost three-tenths of a second slower, unable to get a clean lap to match his teammate. On the slower soft tyres, one lap was impeded by traffic, another was disturbed by Hamilton spinning after hitting the kerb at turn five. He again failed in his attempt on a very fast lap on the super-soft tyres later in the session, being forced wide after repeating his mistake at turn five. Hamilton was just marginally ahead of Sebastian Vettel, who finished third ahead of Pérez. Daniil Kvyat was unable to set a timed lap as his team worked to solve an electrical problem.

== Qualifying ==
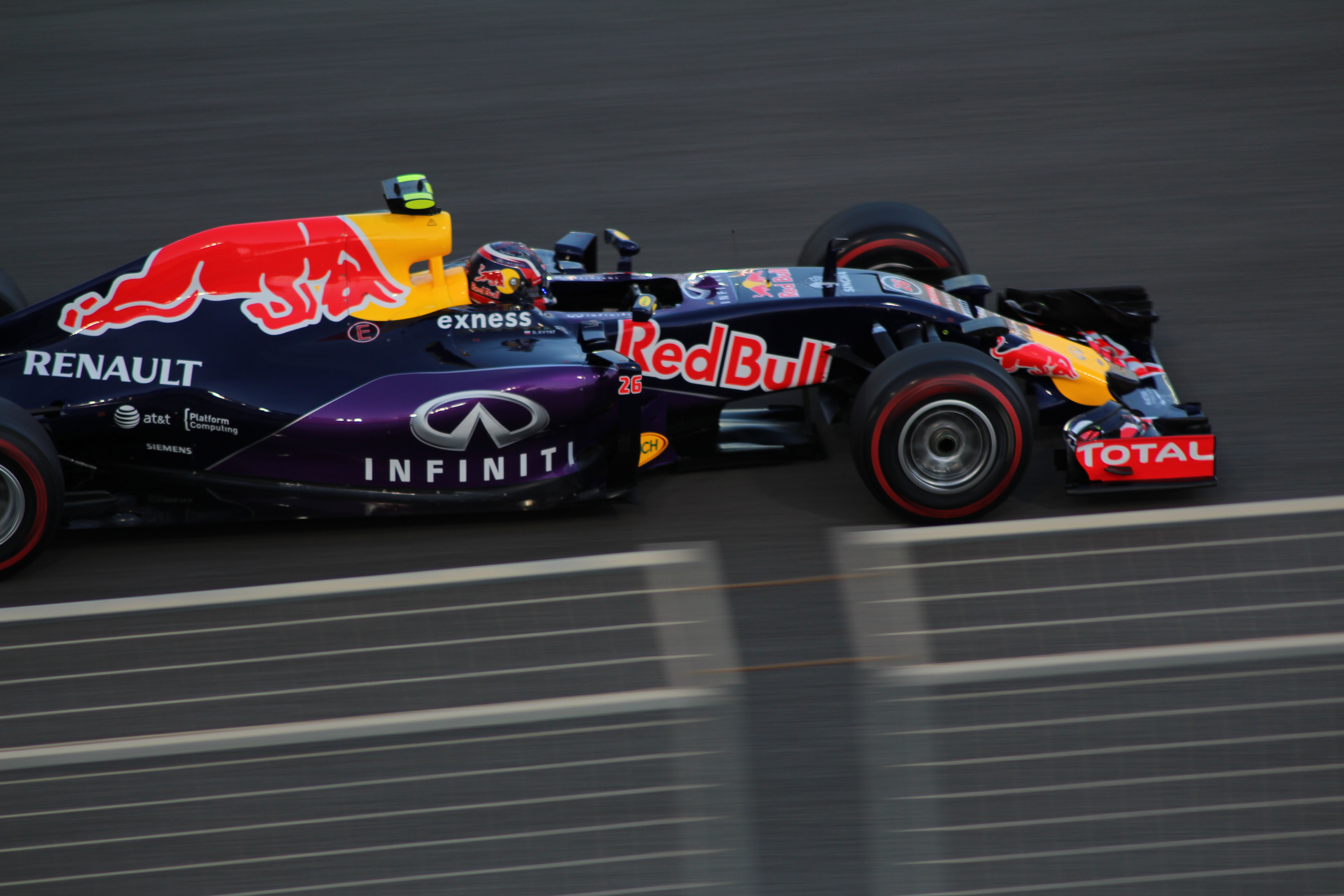
Daniil Kvyat qualified ninth.

Qualifying consisted of three parts, 18, 15 and 12 minutes in length respectively, with five drivers eliminated from competing after each of the first two sessions. At the beginning of the first part of qualifying (Q1), Mercedes sent both their drivers out on the faster super-soft compound, while Ferrari stayed on the slower soft tyres. Even though Ferrari eventually decided to give both their drivers out on the faster tyres towards the end of the session, Sebastian Vettel aborted his last flying lap, believing his time to be sufficient for proceeding into the next round, only for Jenson Button to set a time to relegate Vettel into 16th place on the grid, eliminating him from qualifying. Vettel would later describe his and the team's judgement as "a small mistake with a big consequence". Fernando Alonso in the other McLaren did not make the cut, after a puncture on his last lap left him without a chance at a faster time, while Marcus Ericsson was held up by a technical issue, qualifying 18th. Both Manor Marussia drivers were eliminated at the bottom of the standings, with Will Stevens 1.137 seconds ahead of his teammate Roberto Merhi.

Lewis Hamilton was fastest in Q2, two-tenths of a second ahead of his teammate Rosberg. In his last qualifying session with Lotus, Romain Grosjean experienced technical difficulties that forced him to come back into the pits. Even though he was sent out again, he was unable to set a time, stopping his car at turn seven. His teammate Pastor Maldonado also did not proceed into Q3, as did Jenson Button who missed out by two-tenths of a second. The two other drivers eliminated were Felipe Nasr for Sauber and Max Verstappen, who was unable to match the time of his teammate Carlos Sainz Jr.

The top ten drivers competed for pole position in Q3 and it was a battle between the two Mercedes. Lewis Hamilton set his fastest time first with Rosberg right behind him. A much better time in the third sector of the track allowed Rosberg to take his sixth consecutive pole position almost four-tenths ahead of his teammate. Sergio Pérez held third spot for much of the session but was beaten to it by Kimi Räikkönen during the second turn of runs. The two were followed by Daniel Ricciardo and Valtteri Bottas on the third row of the grid. Following a gearbox change after qualifying, Romain Grosjean was demoted five places on the grid. Roberto Merhi and Will Stevens also received five place penalties: Stevens for a change of the Control Electronics unit, Merhi for changes made to his suspension. Both would start the race from the back row of the grid.

=== Qualifying classification ===
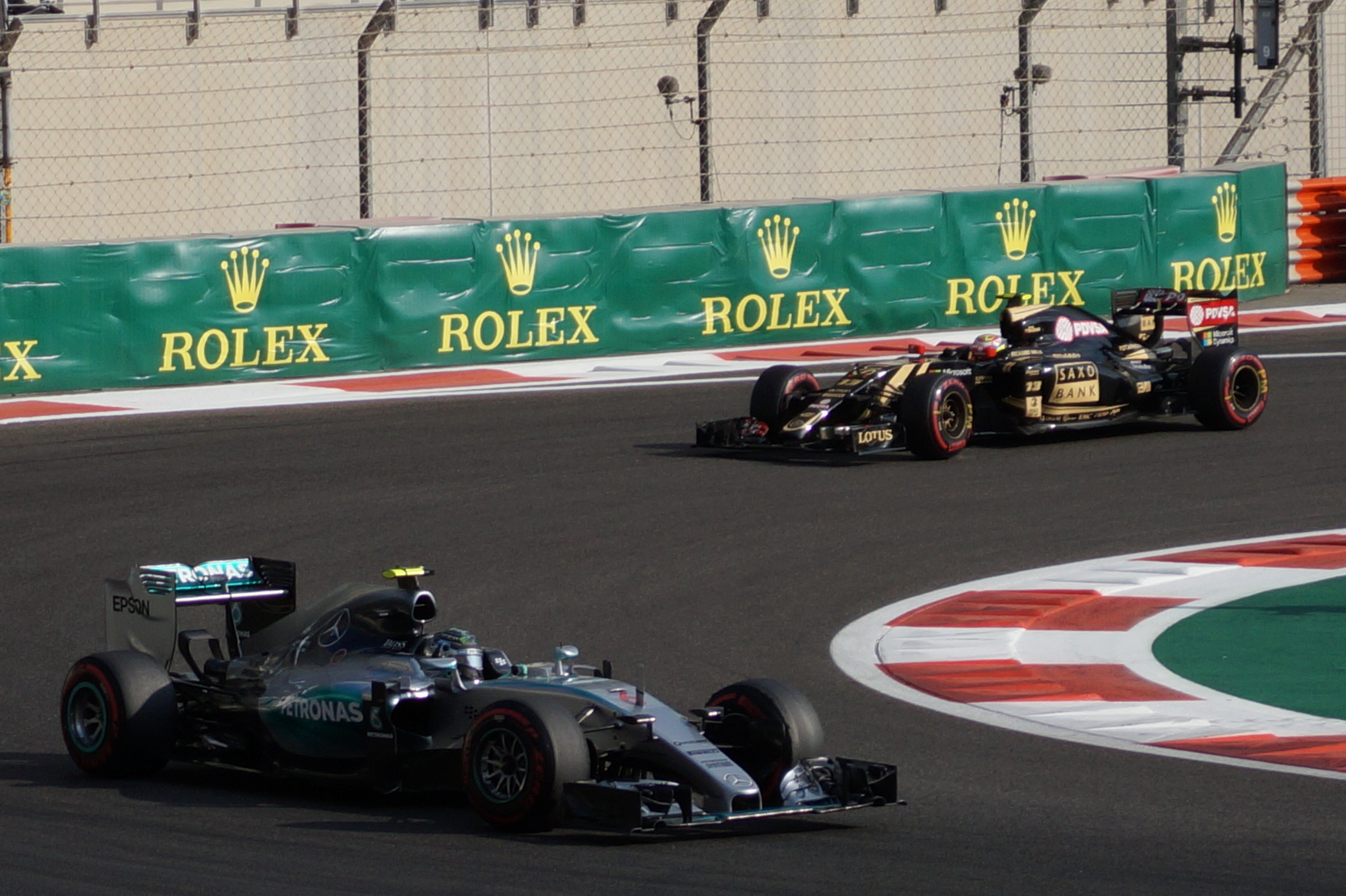
It was Rosberg's third win in a row (seen here racing Romain Grosjean).

Pos.	Car no.	Driver	Constructor	Qualifying times			Final grid
Pos.	Car no.	Driver	Constructor	Q1	Q2	Q3	Final grid
1	6	(Germany) Nico Rosberg	Mercedes	1:41.111	1:40.979	1:40.237	1
2	44	(United Kingdom) Lewis Hamilton	Mercedes	1:40.974	1:40.758	1:40.614	2
3	7	(Finland) Kimi Räikkönen	Ferrari	1:42.500	1:41.612	1:41.051	3
4	11	(Mexico) Sergio Pérez	Force India-Mercedes	1:41.983	1:41.560	1:41.184	4
5	3	(Australia) Daniel Ricciardo	Red Bull Racing-Renault	1:42.275	1:41.830	1:41.444	5
6	77	(Finland) Valtteri Bottas	Williams-Mercedes	1:42.608	1:41.868	1:41.656	6
7	27	(Germany) Nico Hülkenberg	Force India-Mercedes	1:41.996	1:41.925	1:41.686	7
8	19	(Brazil) Felipe Massa	Williams-Mercedes	1:42.303	1:42.349	1:41.759	8
9	26	(Russia) Daniil Kvyat	Red Bull Racing-Renault	1:42.540	1:42.328	1:41.933	9
10	55	(Spain) Carlos Sainz Jr.	Toro Rosso-Renault	1:42.911	1:42.482	1:42.708	10
11	33	(Netherlands) Max Verstappen	Toro Rosso-Renault	1:42.889	1:42.521		11
12	22	(United Kingdom) Jenson Button	McLaren-Honda	1:42.570	1:42.668		12
13	13	(Venezuela) Pastor Maldonado	Lotus-Mercedes	1:42.929	1:42.807		13
14	12	(Brazil) Felipe Nasr	Sauber-Ferrari	1:42.896	1:43.614		14
15	8	(France) Romain Grosjean	Lotus-Mercedes	1:42.585	no time		18^{1}
16	5	(Germany) Sebastian Vettel	Ferrari	1:42.941			15
17	14	(Spain) Fernando Alonso	McLaren-Honda	1:43.187			16
18	9	(Sweden) Marcus Ericsson	Sauber-Ferrari	1:43.838			17
19	28	(United Kingdom) Will Stevens	Marussia-Ferrari	1:46.297			19^{2}
20	98	(Spain) Roberto Merhi	Marussia-Ferrari	1:47.434			PL^{3}
107% time: 1:48.291

Notes:

- ^1 – Romain Grosjean received a five-place grid penalty for an unscheduled gearbox change.
- ^2 – Will Stevens received a five-place grid penalty for a change of his Control Electronics unit.
- ^3 – Roberto Merhi started the race from pit lane after the team took his car out of parc fermé to alter his suspension set-up.

== Race ==
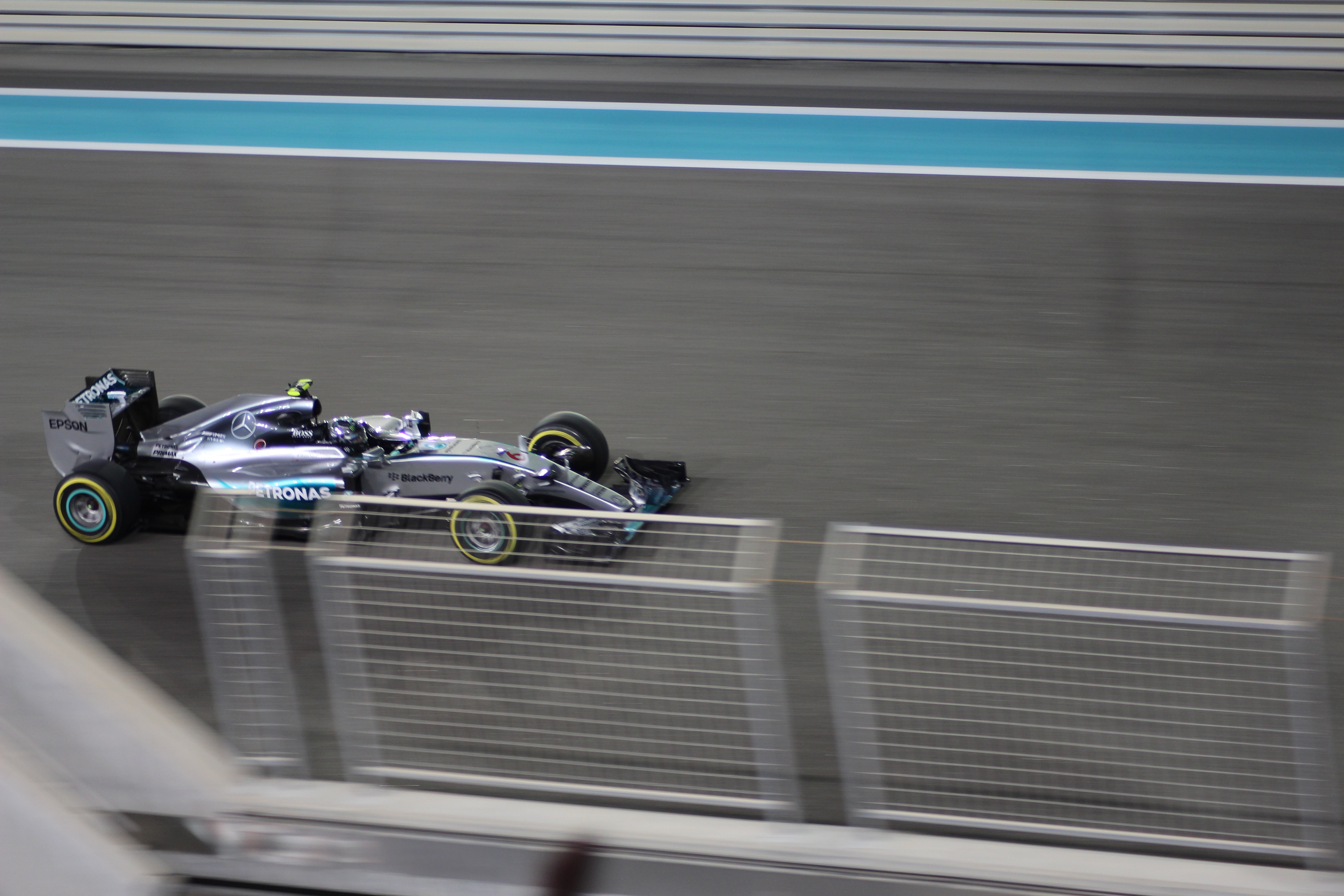
Nico Rosberg won the race for Mercedes.

At the start of the race on Sunday, Hamilton got away slowly but was able to keep both Pérez and Räikkönen behind him while Rosberg retained the lead. Further back, Fernando Alonso made contact with Felipe Nasr and then crashed into Pastor Maldonado, who was forced to retire. Alonso needed to pit for a new front wing and was later given a drive-through penalty, dropping him to the end of the field. Meanwhile, Nico Hülkenberg and Sebastian Vettel made up places, sitting in fifth and twelfth respectively after the first lap. Valtteri Bottas on the other hand lost positions, finding himself in tenth. Rosberg soon built a lead of over one second, giving Hamilton no chance to deploy DRS for an overtake manoeuvre. By lap 5, both Kvyat and Nasr had come into the pits for the harder compound tyre, followed by Ricciardo, Massa and Pérez one lap later. On lap seven, both Hülkenberg and Sainz Jr. made pit stops. While Hülkenberg was able to stay ahead of Massa, Sainz's stop was unfortunate and he lost time due to a problem with the tyre change. Another two laps later, Valtteri Bottas pitted and was sent out into the path of Button, damaging his front wing, which he needed to replace the following lap. He also received a five-second penalty to be served at his next scheduled stop. The leaders pitted for new tyres around laps ten and eleven, with the order now being Rosberg ahead of Vettel, who was yet to stop, Hamilton, and Räikkönen. Romain Grosjean, who started on the harder tyres just as Vettel, was up to sixth.

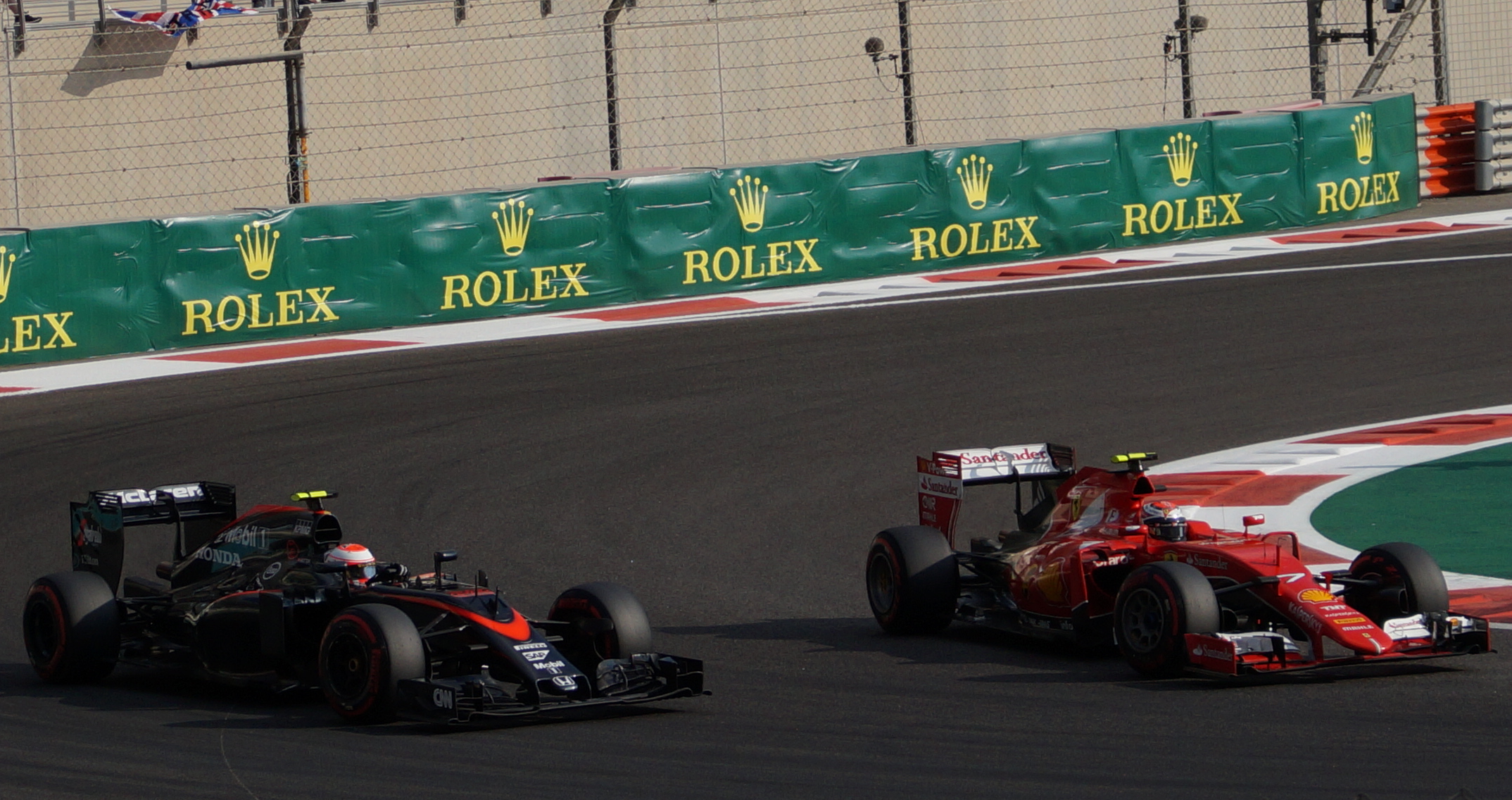
Jenson Button (left) and Kimi Räikkönen

On lap 13, Felipe Massa passed Marcus Ericsson for ninth place and one lap later, Hamilton capitalised on a mistake by Vettel and overtook him to retake second position. Vettel lost another position when he let Räikkönen pass him on lap 16, the two being on different strategies. Meanwhile, Rosberg had built up a lead of around six seconds to Hamilton. On lap 19, Carlos Sainz Jr. allowed teammate Max Verstappen to pass him, while Alonso came in for what was his third pit stop of the race, leaving him in last position. Two laps later, Verstappen created flatspots on his tyres when he locked up his brakes, forcing him to pit. He emerged in 15th position. Vettel came in for his first pit stop on lap 24, coming out in sixth place ahead of compatriot Nico Hülkenberg. At the same time, Hamilton started to reduce the gap to Rosberg in front, cutting it down to less than two seconds by lap 29. With his teammate closing in, Rosberg made pit stops on lap 32, with Räikkönen following suit, whose pit stop was delayed, losing him around four seconds. Sergio Pérez was starting to close the gap to both Ferrari drivers in front of him after pitting early. Vettel reacted on lap 41 and changed to the super-soft tyres, coming out behind both Pérez and Ricciardo in sixth. One lap later, Hamilton came in for his second and final stop, having asked his team before if it would be possible to finish the race without stopping again. He emerged twelve seconds behind Rosberg and started to cut into his advantage immediately.

Further back in the field, Max Verstappen overtook Nasr and Button to move into twelfth place on laps 44 and 46 respectively. However, he was deemed to have forced Button wide and was handed a five-second penalty to be added to his finishing time. Lap 53 saw Romain Grosjean move into the final point scoring position of tenth by passing Carlos Sainz Jr. into turn eight. Just one lap later, he took ninth place from Daniil Kvyat. At the front, Hamilton proved unable to reach his teammate, who took the checkered flag for his sixth win of the season. Kimi Räikkönen completed the podium, followed by Vettel, Pérez and Ricciardo.

== Post-race ==
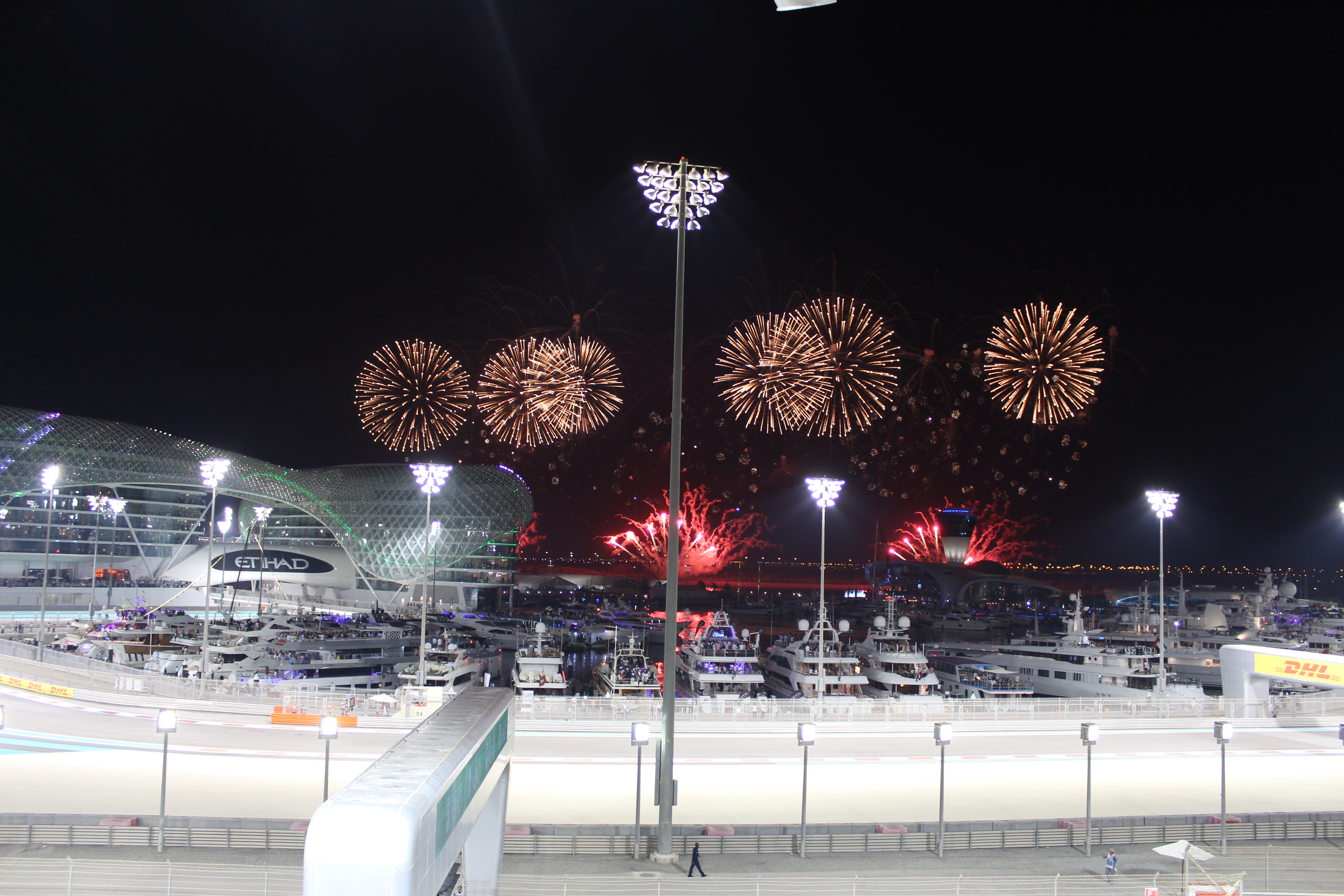
Fireworks after the race

In the podium interviews, conducted by former Formula One driver David Coulthard, Nico Rosberg expressed excitement over how the end of the season had worked out for him, describing the race in the United States as his "low point". Speaking about racing his teammate Hamilton, he called him "one of the best out there" and said that it was "an even better feeling to win, definitely against such opposition". Hamilton in turn praised his team for their performance over the whole season, saying that they had "surpassed their own expectations", albeit confessing that he was happy that the season was over. During the press conference, third-placed Kimi Räikkönen said: "It’s never nice to finish third but I’ll take it after previous races", pointing to a season that had been marred with small mistakes and misfortunes for him. He also stated that securing fourth place in the World Championship did not mean much to him, dismissing the idea of a "Finnish championship" between himself and Valtteri Bottas.

Fourth-placed Sebastian Vettel said after the race: "The best result one way or another would be P3 and P4 so we can be very happy with today", adding that he and Räikkönen had "a clean race for P3". He also described his 2015 campaign as "a miracle", after Ferrari had endured a winless 2014. Speaking about the incident between Bottas and Button at the first round of pit stops, Williams' head of performance engineering Rob Smedley said that the team had released their driver at the right moment, declaring the accident happened because Bottas saw Button too late. Following two incidents during the race, Max Verstappen was given time penalties and three penalty points on his FIA Super Licence – one for overtaking Jenson Button outside track limits and two for ignoring blue flags while Lewis Hamilton tried to lap him. The penalties meant that he was just four points away from a one-race ban.

Räikkönen taking fourth position from Bottas in the Drivers' Championship was the only change in both championship standings as a result of the Grand Prix. Following the Grand Prix, Renault confirmed their takeover of Lotus, meaning that it was the last Grand Prix for the team in their incarnation under the Lotus moniker that had started in 2012.

=== Race classification ===
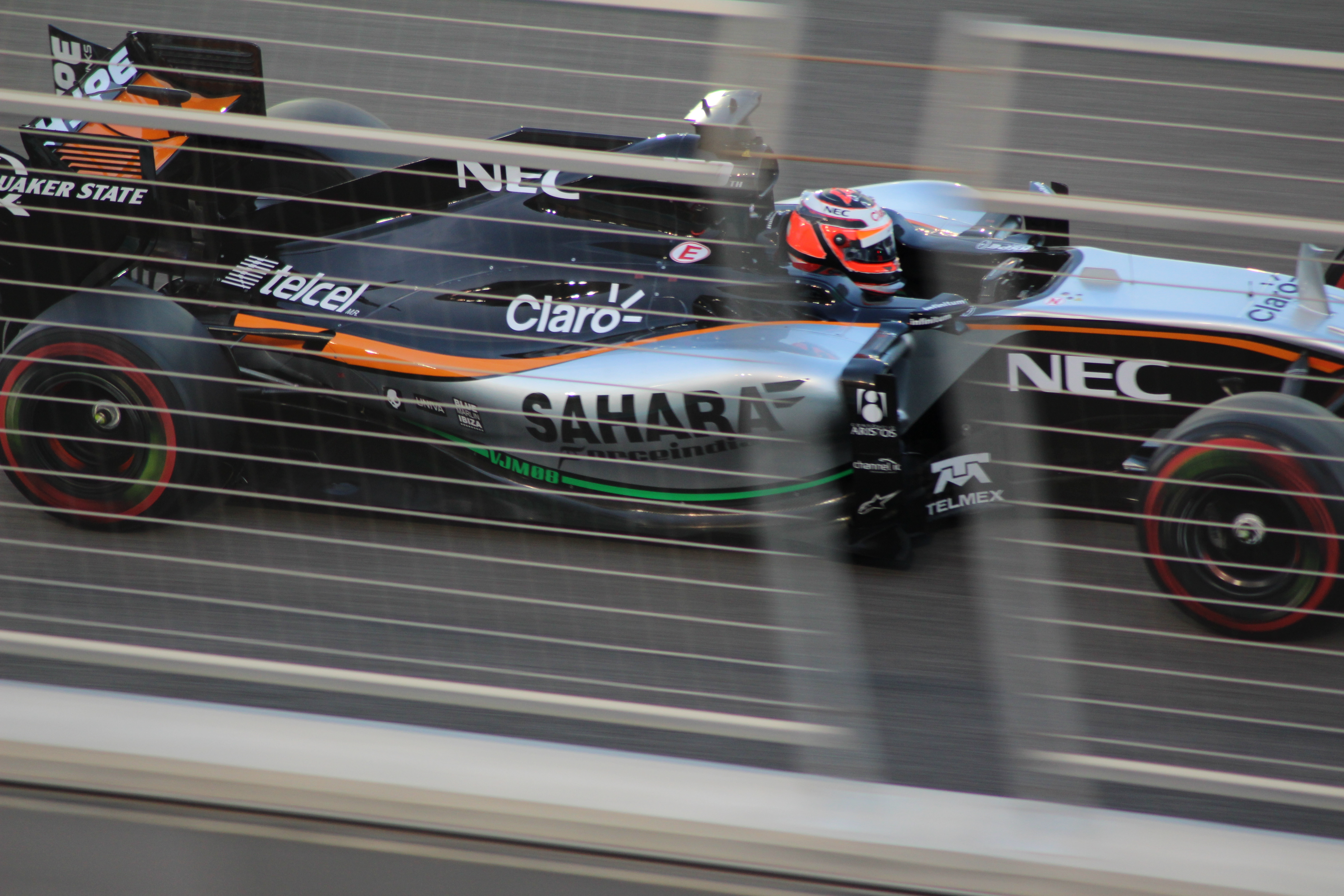
Nico Hülkenberg finished seventh for Force India.

Pos.	No.	Driver	Constructor	Laps	Time/Retired	Grid	Points
1	6	(Germany) Nico Rosberg	Mercedes	55	1:38:30.175	1	25
2	44	(United Kingdom) Lewis Hamilton	Mercedes	55	+8.271	2	18
3	7	(Finland) Kimi Räikkönen	Ferrari	55	+19.430	3	15
4	5	(Germany) Sebastian Vettel	Ferrari	55	+43.735	15	12
5	11	(Mexico) Sergio Pérez	Force India-Mercedes	55	+1:03.952	4	10
6	3	(Australia) Daniel Ricciardo	Red Bull Racing-Renault	55	+1:05.010	5	8
7	27	(Germany) Nico Hülkenberg	Force India-Mercedes	55	+1:33.618	7	6
8	19	(Brazil) Felipe Massa	Williams-Mercedes	55	+1:37.751	8	4
9	8	(France) Romain Grosjean	Lotus-Mercedes	55	+1:38.201	18	2
10	26	(Russia) Daniil Kvyat	Red Bull Racing-Renault	55	+1:42.371	9	1
11	55	(Spain) Carlos Sainz Jr.	Toro Rosso-Renault	55	+1:43.525	10	
12	22	(United Kingdom) Jenson Button	McLaren-Honda	54	+1 Lap	12	
13	77	(Finland) Valtteri Bottas	Williams-Mercedes	54	+1 Lap	6	
14	9	(Sweden) Marcus Ericsson	Sauber-Ferrari	54	+1 Lap	17	
15	12	(Brazil) Felipe Nasr	Sauber-Ferrari	54	+1 Lap	14	
16^{1}	33	(Netherlands) Max Verstappen	Toro Rosso-Renault	54	+1 Lap	11	
17	14	(Spain) Fernando Alonso	McLaren-Honda	53	+2 Laps	16	
18	28	(United Kingdom) Will Stevens	Marussia-Ferrari	53	+2 Laps	19	
19	98	(Spain) Roberto Merhi	Marussia-Ferrari	52	+3 Laps	PL	
Ret	13	(Venezuela) Pastor Maldonado	Lotus-Mercedes	0	Collision	13	

Notes:

- ^1 – Max Verstappen originally finished twelfth, but received a five-second time penalty for overtaking Jenson Button outside track limits and another twenty-second penalty for ignoring blue flags while being lapped.

== Final Championship standings ==
Drivers' Championship standings

	Pos.	Driver	Points
	1	(United Kingdom) **Lewis Hamilton**	381
	2	(Germany) Nico Rosberg	322
	3	(Germany) Sebastian Vettel	278
1	4	(Finland) Kimi Räikkönen	150
1	5	(Finland) Valtteri Bottas	136

Constructors' Championship standings

Pos.	Constructor	Points
1	(Germany) **Mercedes**	703
2	(Italy) Ferrari	428
3	(United Kingdom) Williams-Mercedes	257
4	(Austria) Red Bull Racing-Renault	187
5	Force India-Mercedes	136
Sources:

- Note: Only the top five positions are included for both sets of standings.
- **Bold text** indicates 2015 World Champions.

== See also ==
- 2015 Yas Marina GP2 Series round
- 2015 Yas Marina GP3 Series round

Previous race: 2015 Brazilian Grand Prix	FIA Formula One World Championship; 2015 season	Next race: 2016 Australian Grand Prix
Previous race: 2014 Abu Dhabi Grand Prix	Abu Dhabi Grand Prix	Next race: 2016 Abu Dhabi Grand Prix
