= 2015 United States Grand Prix =

16th round of the 2015 Formula One World Championship

Race 16 of 19 in the 2015 Formula One World Championship
← Previous race	Next race →
- Layout of the Circuit of the Americas

Race details
- Date: October 25, 2015
- Official name: 2015 Formula 1 United States Grand Prix
- Location: Circuit of the Americas; Travis County, Texas
- Course: Permanent racing facility
- Course length: 5.513 km (3.426 miles)
- Distance: 56 laps, 308.405 km (191.634 miles)
- Weather: Very cloudy 17 °C (63 °F) air temperature 17–20 °C (63–68 °F) track temperature 8 m/s (26 ft/s) wind from the south
- Attendance: 224,011 (Weekend) 101,667 (Race Day)

Pole position
Driver	(Germany) Nico Rosberg	Mercedes
- Time: 1:56.824

Fastest lap
Driver	(Germany) Nico Rosberg	Mercedes
- Time: 1:40.666 on lap 49

Podium
First	(United Kingdom) Lewis Hamilton	Mercedes
Second	(Germany) Nico Rosberg	Mercedes
Third	(Germany) Sebastian Vettel	Ferrari

The 2015 United States Grand Prix (formally known as the 2015 Formula 1 United States Grand Prix) was a Formula One motor race that took place on October 25, 2015. The race was contested over fifty-six laps and held at the Circuit of the Americas. It was the sixteenth round of the 2015 season and marked the thirty-seventh time that the United States Grand Prix was run as a round of the World Championship since its inception in 1950, and the fourth time that the event was hosted at this circuit.

Lewis Hamilton was the defending race winner and entered with a 66-point lead in the Drivers' Championship over Sebastian Vettel of Ferrari, with Hamilton's Mercedes teammate Nico Rosberg a further seven points behind. The three-day event was run during a downpour of rain; as a result, the second practice session and the final qualifying session were cancelled, while the whole of qualifying was delayed until the morning of the race day.

Hamilton won the race, passing Nico Rosberg in the later stages, and thereby secured his third Drivers' Championship, as Sebastian Vettel finished third. An incident-packed race saw only twelve cars reach the finish line, with Max Verstappen repeating his best result of the season in fourth and Jenson Button finishing a season-best sixth. After starting in damp conditions, both Red Bull drivers were initially able to challenge the Mercedes for the lead, but later dropped back as the track dried, with Daniil Kvyat retiring after a crash and Daniel Ricciardo eventually finishing tenth.

== Report ==
=== Background ===
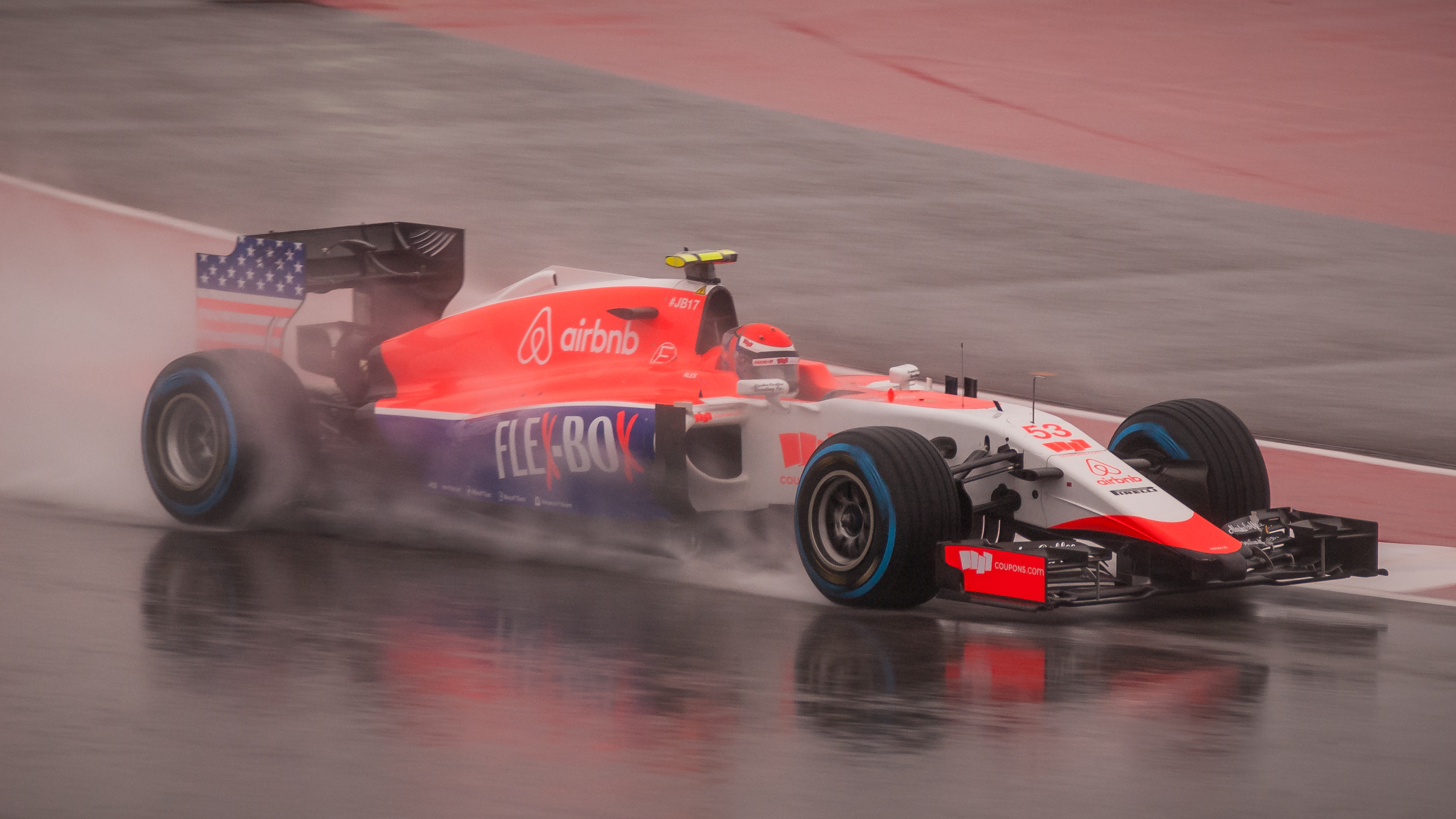
Alexander Rossi returned with Manor Marussia.

Alexander Rossi became the first American to drive in the United States Grand Prix at the Circuit of the Americas, returning to Manor Marussia after Roberto Merhi had raced for them in Russia. The Sauber team celebrated their 400th Grand Prix in Formula One. The weather was forecast to be wet all weekend, with especially treacherous conditions on Friday afternoon and Saturday, while the race day itself was expected to be slightly less wet.

Fernando Alonso ran a new power unit in his McLaren over the weekend, one that he had already used once during practice for the previous race in Russia, having taken the grid penalty for it there. Teammate Jenson Button hoped for Alonso to "annihilate" him, adding: "It's unusual to say that, but in our situation it's about getting it on the car." McLaren also introduced new aerodynamic parts to their cars for the Grand Prix. Both Vettel and Kimi Räikkönen of Ferrari needed to exchange their power units. Having already used the allowed four units for the season, both drivers received ten-place grid penalties. Manor Marussia's Will Stevens was placed back 20 grid spots for a change of his engine, turbocharger and MGU-H unit. Renault used eleven of their twelve remaining tokens for changes to their power unit. Both customer teams, Red Bull and Toro Rosso, chose not to run with the update, saying its performance advantage was not worth taking the grid penalties. Red Bull and McLaren used new front wings, emulating a concept introduced by Mercedes supposed to create more downforce by directing the airflow towards the outside of the front tyres. Similar changes were made by Ferrari to their SF15-T. In preparation for the effects of the high altitude in Mexico, Mercedes added two "ears" at the top of the airbox in order to improve cooling to the energy recovery system of their power unit.

The race used the same two DRS zones as previous races at the track. The first was between turns eleven and twelve, and the second on the start/finish straight between turns twenty and one. Pirelli supplied teams with the white-banded medium tyre as the prime compound and the yellow-banded soft tyre as the option selection, with the manufacturer citing the characteristics of the circuit with "a wide range of corners and elevations" as the reason the two middle compounds were chosen.

=== Championship permutations ===
Coming into the weekend, Mercedes had already secured the Constructors' Championship, having done so at the previous race in Russia. Ferrari was in second place on 359 points, 139 points ahead of Williams. In the Drivers' Championship, Lewis Hamilton led with 302 points, 66 ahead of Sebastian Vettel and 73 ahead of his teammate, Nico Rosberg. This meant that Hamilton would be able to win the title

	Hamilton would have won the championship if:		
	(United Kingdom) Lewis Hamilton	(Germany) Sebastian Vettel	(Germany) Nico Rosberg
Pos.	1st	3rd or lower	Does not matter
Pos.	2nd	6th or lower	3rd or lower
Pos.	3rd	7th or lower	4th or lower
Pos.	4th	9th or lower	5th or lower
Pos.	5th	10th or lower	6th or lower
Pos.	6th or lower	Cannot clinch	

=== Free practice ===
Per the regulations for the 2015 season, three practice sessions were scheduled, two 1.5-hour sessions on Friday and another one-hour session before qualifying on Saturday; however, with treacherous weather conditions including flood warnings, the second practice session was cancelled due to heavy rain and a thunderstorm. The other two practice sessions were run in wet conditions.

Nico Rosberg topped the timesheets on Friday, ahead of the two Red Bull cars of Daniil Kvyat and Daniel Ricciardo. The session started on a very wet track, but with no more rain falling, it dried out as the practice progressed, with drivers soon switching to intermediate tyres. Lewis Hamilton was fifth fastest, behind Carlos Sainz Jr. Despite going off the track late in the session, Fernando Alonso was ninth fastest in the McLaren with the new power unit. A gearbox problem meant that Pastor Maldonado was unable to take to the track, while at Sauber, Raffaele Marciello replaced Felipe Nasr, ending the session three-tenths of a second quicker than teammate Marcus Ericsson.

The practice session on Saturday was run without spectators to ensure their safety. On track, Lewis Hamilton was fastest, ahead of his closest championship rival Sebastian Vettel. With conditions worsening over the course of the session, Vettel spun out twice. Max Verstappen ended the session last, while Force India's Nico Hülkenberg was third, ahead of Valtteri Bottas and Sainz.

=== Qualifying ===
Inclement weather continued to disrupt the Saturday's proceedings as qualifying was delayed multiple times before being ultimately rescheduled for Sunday morning. Many drivers backed the decision, with Jenson Button saying: "It was the right thing to do ... . In one respect, maybe if we decided three hours earlier it would have been better for the fans. But we wanted to get out there and drive and put on a show. Delaying it every half an hour was the way it had to be." During the waiting period on Saturday, many teams had engaged in tomfoolery in the paddock to entertain the crowds, such as bowling or ballroom dancing between Red Bull teammates Daniel Ricciardo and Daniil Kvyat. Ferrari later condemned the behaviour of their fellow teams, with team principal Maurizio Arrivabene saying: "We are a Formula One team, not the Cirque du Soleil." Kimi Räikkönen backed him, stating: "I think this is F1 and not the circus. The people are obviously not happy when we're not running but we cannot make them happy with whatever we do apart from running."

Qualifying was scheduled to consist of three parts, 18, 15 and 12 minutes in length respectively, with five drivers eliminated from competing after each of the first two sessions. The first part of qualifying (Q1) was disrupted after a little more than five minutes, when Sainz crashed at turn four, bringing out red flags. Due to the prospect of worsening rain and the chance that qualifying could be brought to an end by the weather at any point, the teams fought for grid positions early on, with Lewis Hamilton, Nico Rosberg and Daniel Ricciardo setting the fastest times. Apart from Sainz, both Manor Marussia drivers were eliminated, along with the two Sauber cars of Marcus Ericsson and Felipe Nasr. Sebastian Vettel, after making contact with a barrier, finished Q1 in fifteenth place, barely making it into Q2.

In Q2, lap times improved and the two Mercedes drivers led the way, with Rosberg a little over a tenth of a second ahead of teammate Hamilton. Fernando Alonso went faster than Valtteri Bottas and looked to make it into Q3, when Max Verstappen went faster and eliminated the McLaren driver. Also not in the top ten were both Lotus and the second McLaren of Jenson Button. Conditions soon worsened, preventing faster lap times. Many drivers spun out in the latter part of the session, complaining about aquaplaning.

With more rain falling, the decision was made to cancel the third part of qualifying and use the results of Q2 to determine the grid. Therefore, Nico Rosberg secured his third consecutive pole position, ahead of Hamilton, Ricciardo, and Daniil Kvyat. Fifth fastest was Sebastian Vettel for Ferrari, but his grid penalty meant that the third row on the grid was made up by the two Force India cars of Sergio Pérez and Nico Hülkenberg respectively. The penalties for both Ferraris saw Fernando Alonso move up to ninth on the grid, the highest grid position for McLaren at that point of the season. Following his third pole in a row, Rosberg said he wanted to win the race "really badly", after being passed by Hamilton in Japan and retiring from the Russian Grand Prix whilst in the lead. Sainz required permission from the stewards to start the race, after failing to set a time within 107% of Ricciardo's fastest lap in Q1. He was later allowed to start and did so after his team was able to repair his car in time for the start. Following a gearbox change, Valtteri Bottas received a five-place grid penalty, moving him from eleventh to sixteenth on the grid.

=== Race ===
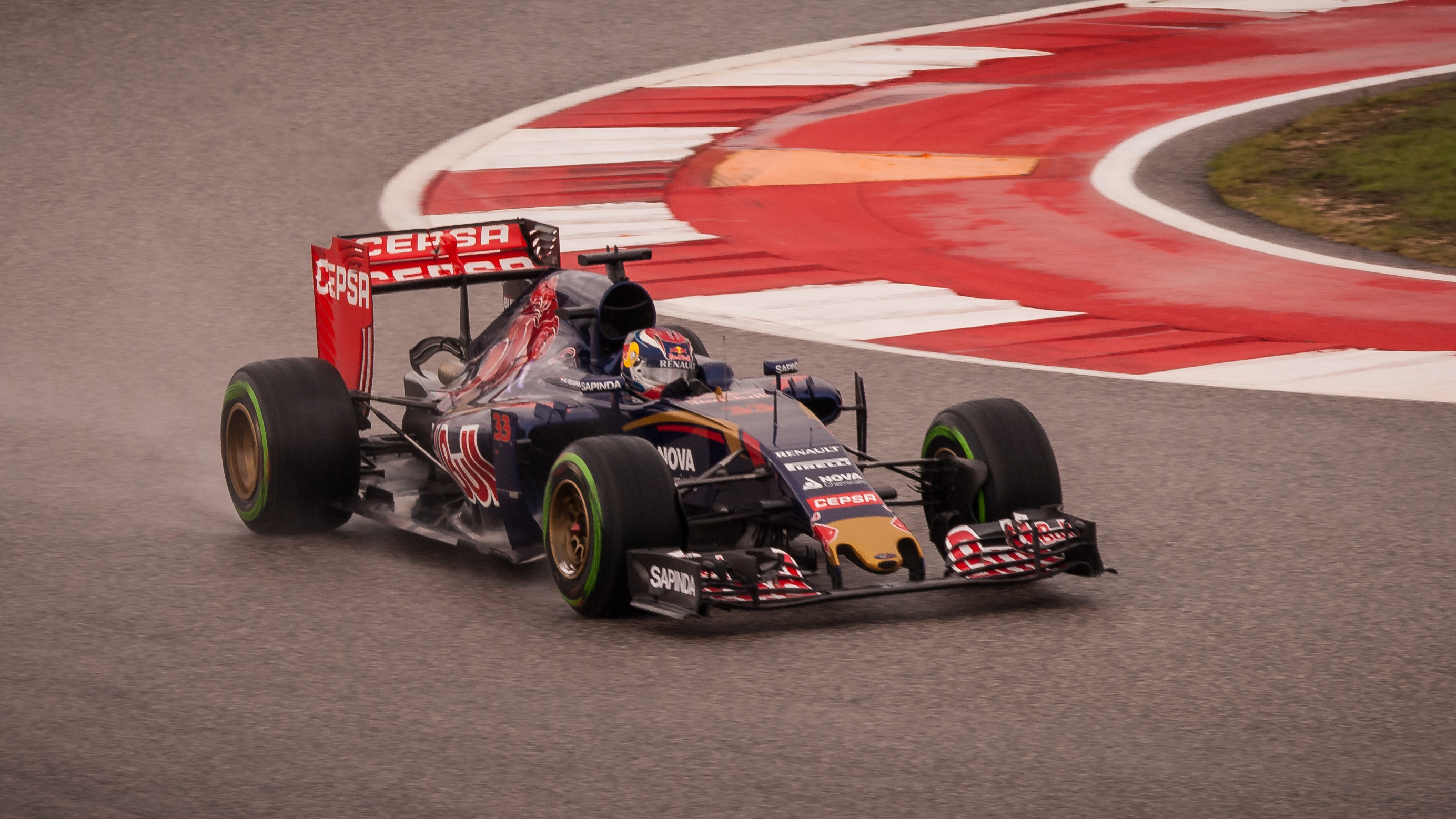
Max Verstappen equalled his best finish of the season, finishing fourth.

While the rain had stopped by race time, the track was still wet and slippery; all drivers opted to start on intermediate tyres. Hamilton got away better at the start, entering the first corner alongside pole-sitter Rosberg, and, by forcing the German wide, took the lead exiting the first turn. Getting off track saw Rosberg lose additional positions, running fifth behind Hamilton, Kvyat, Ricciardo and Pérez. Further back, a collision involved Alonso, Massa, the two Sauber cars of Ericsson and Nasr as well as Bottas, who made a pit stop after the first lap, as did Nasr, who was the first to fit slick tyres, as the track was starting to dry. Will Stevens was touched from behind by teammate Alexander Rossi, breaking his rear wing and forcing him to retire. Having started from the back of the grid, Carlos Sainz profited from the incidents and had moved up to tenth by the end of the first lap. While Rosberg soon took back fourth from Pérez, Hamilton, in front, came under pressure from Kvyat, with the Red Bull drivers running fast in the damp conditions. With Kvyat just half a second behind the championship leader, a virtual safety car period was declared on lap five to clear the debris from the first corner incident. On lap 7, Valtteri Bottas retired with a damper failure caused by the turn one contact. When the virtual safety car ended on lap 8, Rosberg made an immediate move on Ricciardo to move into third, overtaking Kvyat for second on the same lap. Romain Grosjean became another victim of the accident on lap one when he came into the pit lane for a second time on lap 12 and retired. By that point, Sebastian Vettel had moved up into sixth place from thirteenth on the grid. Up front, Kvyat went wide while trying to overtake Rosberg, allowing teammate Ricciardo through into third; Ricciardo in turn made a successful manoeuvre on Rosberg to move up into second.

A battle for the lead developed between Hamilton and Ricciardo, until the Australian moved around Hamilton on lap 15. With the grip of the intermediate tyres deteriorating, there were many overtaking manoeuvres on track. Rosberg unsuccessfully tried to overtake teammate Hamilton for second on lap 16, while Verstappen took sixth place from Vettel one lap later, only to run wide and lose the position again. On lap 18, Rosberg moved ahead of Hamilton, who was the first of the front runners to change tyres at the end of the lap, going for a dry compound. The other frontrunners followed suit over the next couple of laps. Following the pit stops, Ricciardo led from Rosberg, Kvyat and Hamilton. The two Mercedes drivers moved ahead of their respective Red Bull rivals on laps 22 and 23, while Vettel, now in fifth, closed on the leading quartet. On lap 24, he reached Kvyat and overtook him for fourth, while Rosberg extended his lead to Ricciardo to nine seconds by lap 25. Hamilton took second place from Ricciardo one lap later. At the same time, Kimi Räikkönen was forced to retire. So had Massa on lap 24, suffering the same problem that had forced his teammate to stop.

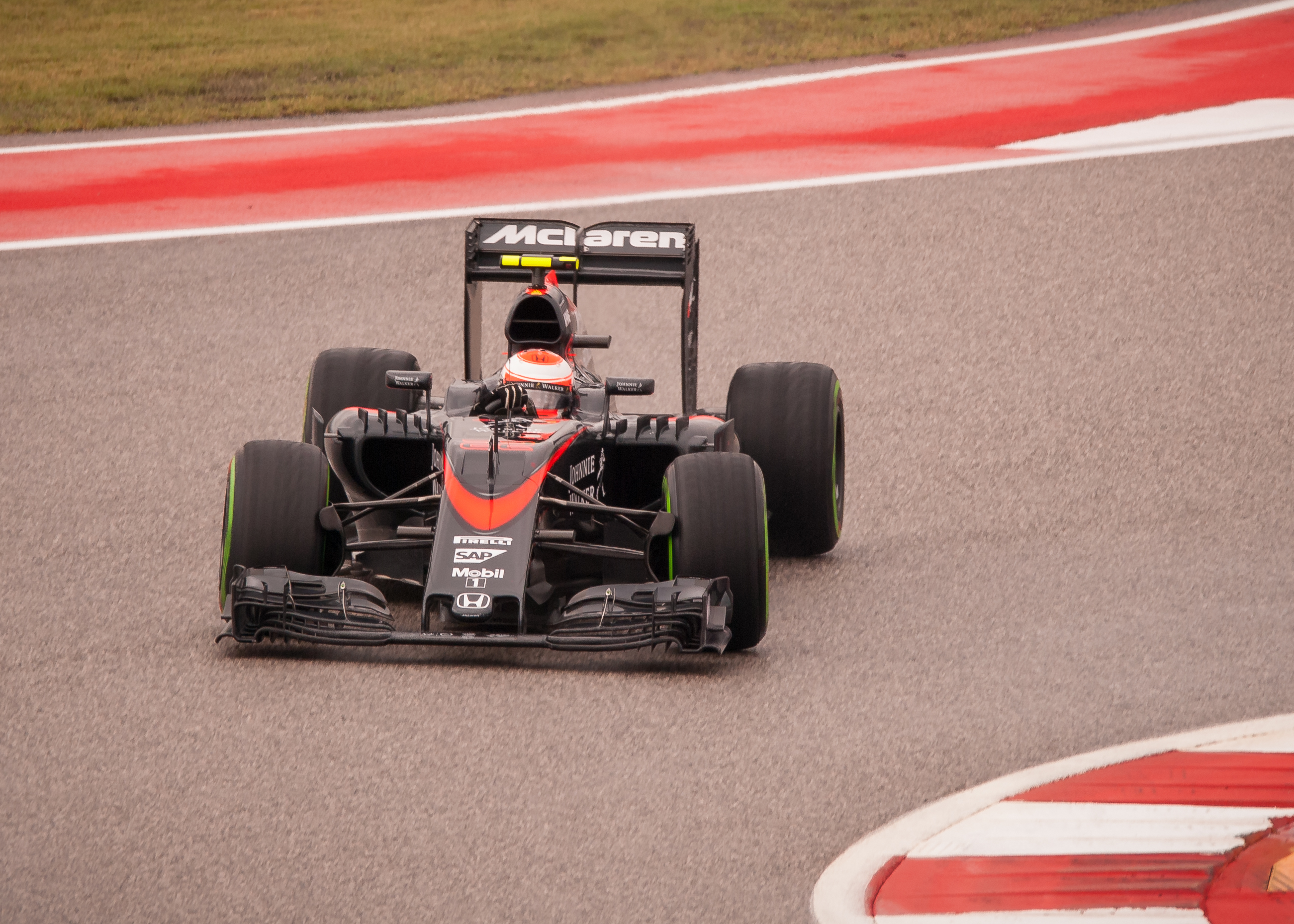
Jenson Button achieved his best result of the season up to that point in sixth place.

On lap 27, Marcus Ericsson's Sauber came to a halt on track, bringing out the proper safety car. At this halfway point of the race, the order stood as: Rosberg, Hamilton, Ricciardo, Kvyat, Verstappen, as Vettel used the safety car period for a tyre change, moving him back into sixth. When the safety car pulled into pit lane at the end of lap 32, Vettel was back in fifth after Verstappen had also made a pit stop for new tyres. The German moved ahead into fourth at Kvyat's expense into turn one at the restart and went on to overtake the other Red Bull of Ricciardo some turns later; however, Ricciardo fought back to regain the place in the next corner. Vettel was able to make the move stick going into turn one on the subsequent lap. Meanwhile, Kvyat was further demoted when Verstappen moved ahead into fifth, followed by Hülkenberg. On lap 35, Verstappen overtook the second Red Bull of Ricciardo to move into fourth. When Nico Hülkenberg attempted to do the same one lap later, he and Ricciardo collided, forcing the German to retire. Ricciardo was able to continue but was overtaken by his teammate, with Jenson Button behind in seventh place. When another virtual safety car period was declared to clear Hülkenberg's car, Rosberg decided to pit, moving him back to fourth behind Hamilton, Vettel and Verstappen. By lap 40, when the safety car period was over, Rosberg was up into third at the expense of Verstappen, while Alonso moved up several places into sixth, with teammate Button in fifth. Running on newer tyres, Rosberg was able to overtake Vettel on lap 42.

One lap later, Kvyat suffered a heavy impact at the penultimate corner, causing another safety car period. Both Hamilton and Vettel used this to change tyres again, as did Button on lap 45. The safety car came back in at the end of lap 46, with the order being: Rosberg, Hamilton, Verstappen, Vettel, Alonso, Pérez, Button and Maldonado. At the restart, Verstappen tried to move past Hamilton but failed and was in turn overtaken by Vettel. On lap 48, Rosberg lost the lead to Hamilton after sliding off track due to wheelspin in his rear tyres. The German later declared that his mistake was caused by a strong gust of wind. Hamilton soon opened up a gap to his teammate, while Button moved up into sixth ahead of Alonso on lap 50, but lost the position again to Sainz before the end of the race. His teammate Alonso had been running fifth, but a loss of power from his engine moved him down the order to eventually finish eleventh. In the closing laps, Vettel edged closer to Rosberg in second but was unable to overtake. This meant that Hamilton, who crossed the line as race winner, also took his third career championship title, with both Vettel and Rosberg now too far behind.

=== Post-race ===
At the podium interviews, conducted by Elton John, Nico Rosberg expressed his disappointment at the outcome of the race. He had visibly vented his anger in the cool down room, when he was seen throwing his podium cap back at Lewis Hamilton after Hamilton threw it to him, an incident he later played down as "just our typical games". Sebastian Vettel was delighted with his performance, saying that the team had "exceeded all expectations". Hamilton, the newly crowned world champion, called his third title "the greatest moment of my life", thanking his father and his family for their support. Comparing the title win to his two previous ones, he said: "the last two times were really climactic in the last race. This one still feels just as special if not more special ... . It has kind of topped last year for me – it's equalling Ayrton [Senna]." He described equalling his idol's title tally as "a very humbling experience", saying that he felt "very blessed". More friction appeared at Mercedes, when Nico Rosberg called Hamilton's manoeuvre at the start "very, very aggressive". Hamilton in turn said of the incident: "It was very close with Nico at the beginning. It wasn't intentional. We both braked deep and there is no grip there and he was turning and I wasn't turning." The team's executive director Toto Wolff said that the incident would need to be discussed, a notion dismissed by Hamilton, who said: "There is no need. Everyone has a right to an opinion but it doesn't matter. I won the race."

Manor Marussia's Alexander Rossi was delighted with his result in twelfth, feeling that it could be "the start of great things", after he had equalled the team's best result of the season. Daniel Ricciardo called for the FIA to clear up the regulations of the virtual safety car, following him being overtaken easily at the first restart by Nico Rosberg, saying that he had not gotten a warning about the end of the period. Kimi Räikkönen was equally displeased, complaining about the rules concerning driving standards. Following his on-track battle with Max Verstappen, he demanded clarification on whether Verstappen's aggressive driving style was legal, saying: "I just wanted to ask if it's OK when you are next to another car, at some point on the exit of the corner are you allowed to always push the other car up on the kerbs ... . Apparently it's fine. As long as everybody has the same rules that's OK." Concerning the collision between Nico Hülkenberg and Ricciardo, Force India revealed that damage to Hülkenberg's front wing had caused him to lose downforce and slide into the Red Bull. Following the turn one collision between their two drivers, Sauber's team principal Monisha Kaltenborn announced that she intended to "have a word" with her drivers, saying: "The bottom line of this is that these kind of things simply must not happen. It is OK if you have decent and healthy competition which they do – both drivers are respectful to each other. ... I'm upset. These mistakes shouldn't happen. We are much better than this."

Following the Grand Prix, Bobby Epstein, chairman of the Circuit of the Americas spoke of a "tough weekend" for the organisers. According to Epstein, the weekend had been "financially devastating ... for the company" that runs the track. This was caused in large parts by the weather conditions over the weekend, while the return of the Mexican Grand Prix also played a role.

== Classification ==
=== Qualifying ===
Pos.	Car no.	Driver	Constructor	Qualifying times		Final grid
Pos.	Car no.	Driver	Constructor	Q1	Q2	Final grid
1	6	(Germany) Nico Rosberg	Mercedes	1:56.671	1:56.824	1
2	44	(United Kingdom) Lewis Hamilton	Mercedes	1:56.871	1:56.929	2
3	3	(Australia) Daniel Ricciardo	Red Bull Racing-Renault	1:56.495	1:57.969	3
4	26	(Russia) Daniil Kvyat	Red Bull Racing-Renault	1:57.640	1:58.434	4
5	5	(Germany) Sebastian Vettel	Ferrari	2:00.950	1:58.596	13^{2}
6	11	(Mexico) Sergio Pérez	Force India-Mercedes	1:59.284	1:59.210	5
7	27	(Germany) Nico Hülkenberg	Force India-Mercedes	1:58.325	1:59.333	6
8	7	(Finland) Kimi Räikkönen	Ferrari	1:58.198	1:59.703	18^{2}
9	19	(Brazil) Felipe Massa	Williams-Mercedes	2:00.902	1:59.999	7
10	33	(Netherlands) Max Verstappen	Toro Rosso-Renault	1:58.689	2:00.199	8
11	14	(Spain) Fernando Alonso	McLaren-Honda	1:59.704	2:00.265	9
12	77	(Finland) Valtteri Bottas	Williams-Mercedes	1:59.569	2:00.334	16^{3}
13	8	(France) Romain Grosjean	Lotus-Mercedes	2:00.236	2:00.595	10
14	22	(United Kingdom) Jenson Button	McLaren-Honda	2:00.261	2:01.193	11
15	13	(Venezuela) Pastor Maldonado	Lotus-Mercedes	2:00.844	2:01.604	12
16	9	(Sweden) Marcus Ericsson	Sauber-Ferrari	2:02.212		14
17	12	(Brazil) Felipe Nasr	Sauber-Ferrari	2:03.194		15
18	53	(United States) Alexander Rossi	Marussia-Ferrari	2:04.176		17
19	28	(United Kingdom) Will Stevens	Marussia-Ferrari	2:04.526		19^{4}
107% time: 2:04.653
—	55	(Spain) Carlos Sainz Jr.	Toro Rosso-Renault	2:07.304		20^{5}

Notes

- ^1 – Due to heavy rain and aquaplaning on track during Q2, Q3 was cancelled with all positions being taken from Q2 times.
- ^2 – Sebastian Vettel and Kimi Räikkönen both received ten-place grid penalties for using an additional power unit.
- ^3 – Valtteri Bottas received a five-place grid penalty for a gearbox change after qualifying.
- ^4 – Will Stevens received a twenty-place grid penalty for various changes to his power unit but was not placed at the back of the grid due to Sainz not setting a timed lap.
- ^5 – Carlos Sainz Jr. failed to set a lap time within 107% of the fastest time set in Q1; he was later permitted to race by the stewards.

=== Race ===
Pos.	No.	Driver	Constructor	Laps	Time/Retired	Grid	Points
1	44	(United Kingdom) Lewis Hamilton	Mercedes	56	1:50:52.703	2	25
2	6	(Germany) Nico Rosberg	Mercedes	56	+2.850	1	18
3	5	(Germany) Sebastian Vettel	Ferrari	56	+3.381	13	15
4	33	(Netherlands) Max Verstappen	Toro Rosso-Renault	56	+22.359	8	12
5	11	(Mexico) Sergio Pérez	Force India-Mercedes	56	+24.413	5	10
6	22	(United Kingdom) Jenson Button	McLaren-Honda	56	+28.058	11	8
7^{1}	55	(Spain) Carlos Sainz Jr.	Toro Rosso-Renault	56	+30.619	20	6
8	13	(Venezuela) Pastor Maldonado	Lotus-Mercedes	56	+32.273	12	4
9	12	(Brazil) Felipe Nasr	Sauber-Ferrari	56	+40.257	15	2
10	3	(Australia) Daniel Ricciardo	Red Bull Racing-Renault	56	+53.571	3	1
11	14	(Spain) Fernando Alonso	McLaren-Honda	56	+54.816	9	
12	53	(United States) Alexander Rossi	Marussia-Ferrari	56	+1:15.277	17	
Ret	26	(Russia) Daniil Kvyat	Red Bull Racing-Renault	41	Accident	4	
Ret	27	(Germany) Nico Hülkenberg	Force India-Mercedes	35	Collision	6	
Ret	9	(Sweden) Marcus Ericsson	Sauber-Ferrari	25	Electrical	14	
Ret	7	(Finland) Kimi Räikkönen	Ferrari	25	Brakes	18	
Ret	19	(Brazil) Felipe Massa	Williams-Mercedes	23	Suspension	7	
Ret	8	(France) Romain Grosjean	Lotus-Mercedes	10	Brakes	10	
Ret	77	(Finland) Valtteri Bottas	Williams-Mercedes	5	Suspension	16	
Ret	28	(United Kingdom) Will Stevens	Marussia-Ferrari	1	Collision damage	19	

Notes

- ^1 – Carlos Sainz Jr. finished sixth but had five seconds added to his race time for speeding in the pit lane.

== Championship standings after the race ==
Drivers' Championship standings

Pos.	Driver	Points
1	(United Kingdom) **Lewis Hamilton**	327
2	(Germany) Sebastian Vettel	251
3	(Germany) Nico Rosberg	247
4	(Finland) Kimi Räikkönen	123
5	(Finland) Valtteri Bottas	111

Constructors' Championship standings

Pos.	Constructor	Points
1	(Germany) **Mercedes**	574
2	(Italy) Ferrari	374
3	(United Kingdom) Williams-Mercedes	220
4	(Austria) Red Bull Racing-Renault	150
5	Force India-Mercedes	102

- Note: Only the top five positions are included for both sets of standings.
- **Bold text** indicates 2015 World Champions.

Previous race: 2015 Russian Grand Prix	FIA Formula One World Championship; 2015 season	Next race: 2015 Mexican Grand Prix
Previous race: 2014 United States Grand Prix	United States Grand Prix	Next race: 2016 United States Grand Prix
