= 2014 Formula One World Championship =

65th season of FIA Formula One World Championship

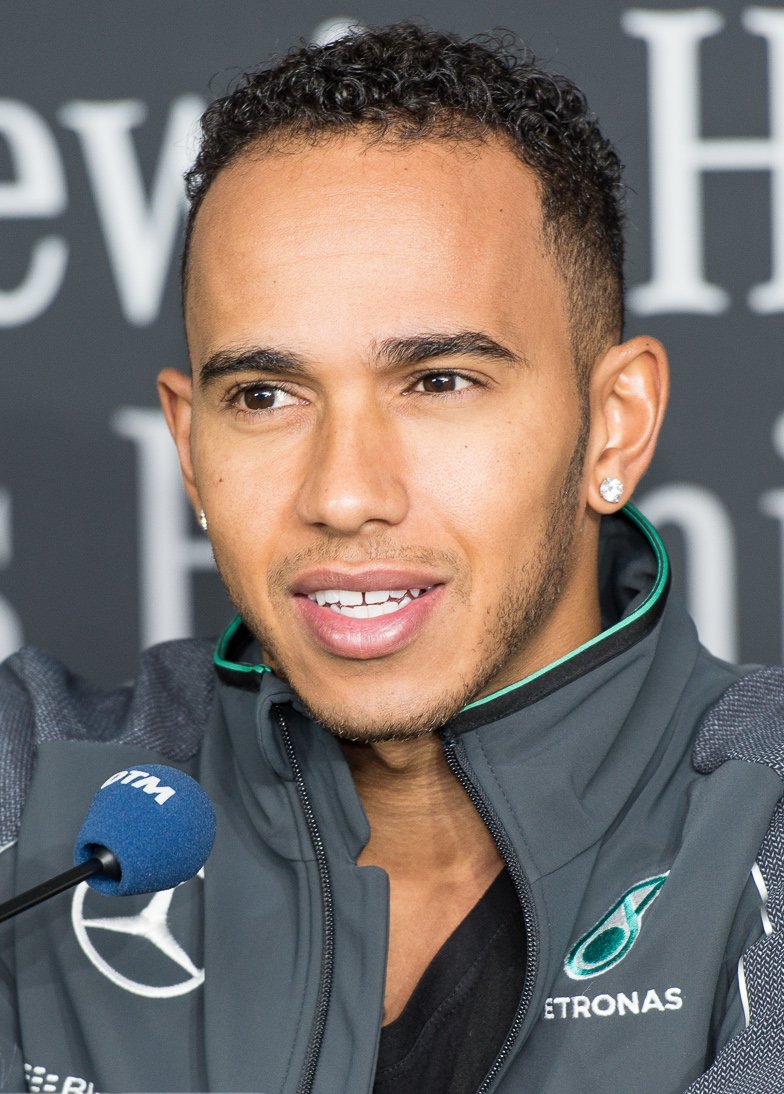
Lewis Hamilton won his second of seven World Drivers' Championship in his second season with Mercedes. His first title since 2008.

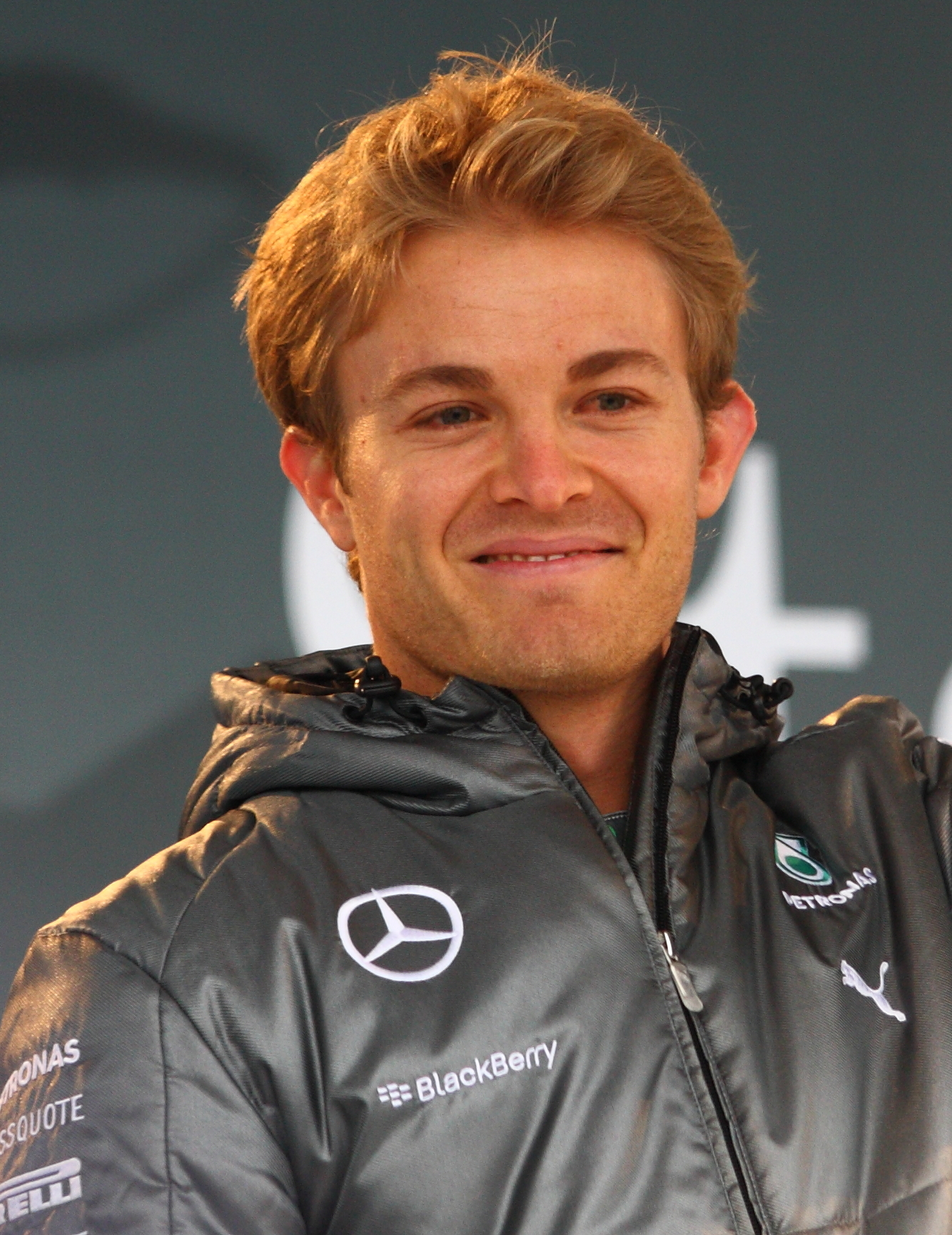
Hamilton's teammate Nico Rosberg finished second in the Drivers' Championship and won the inaugural Pole Trophy.

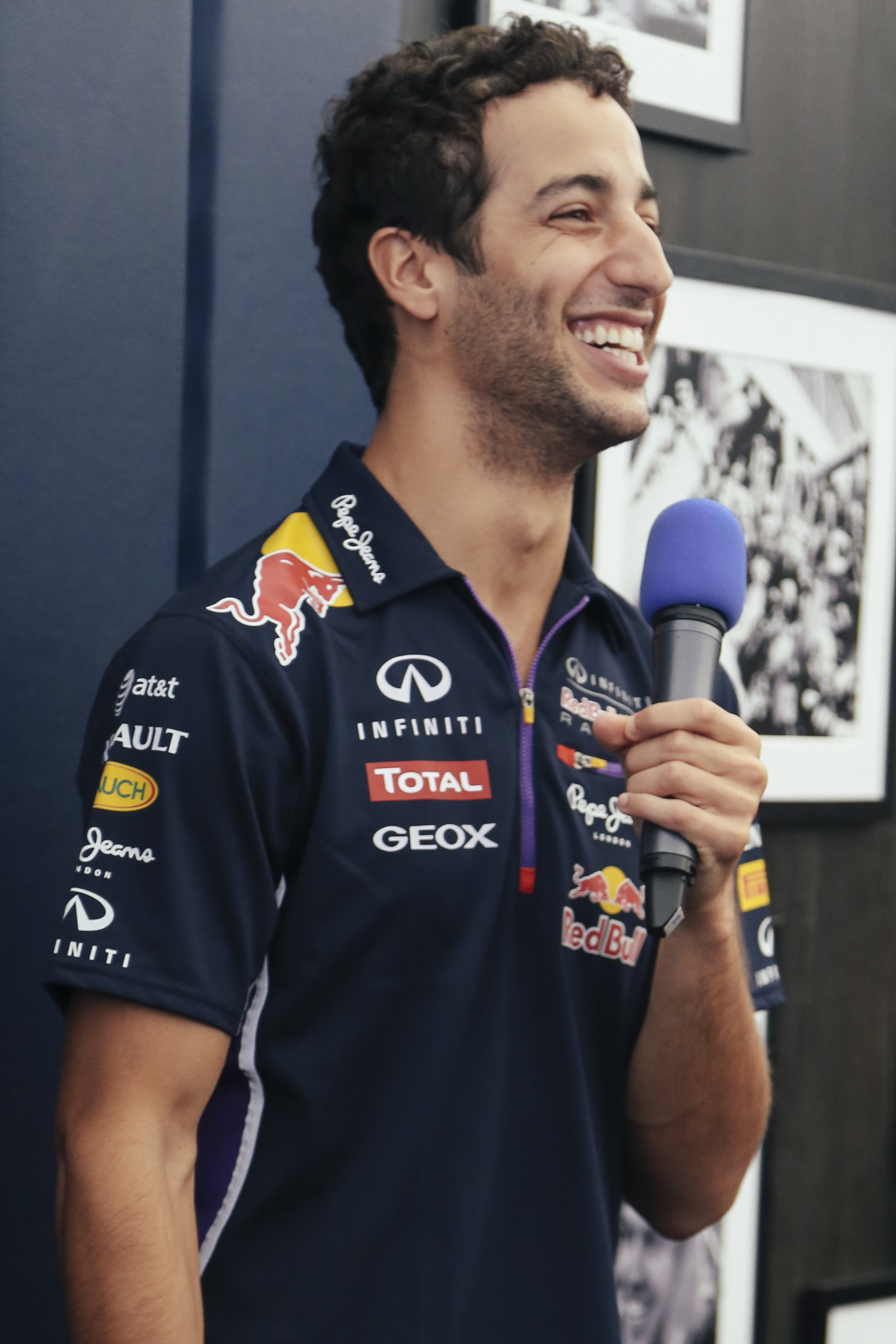
Daniel Ricciardo finished in third place, in his first year driving for Red Bull Racing.

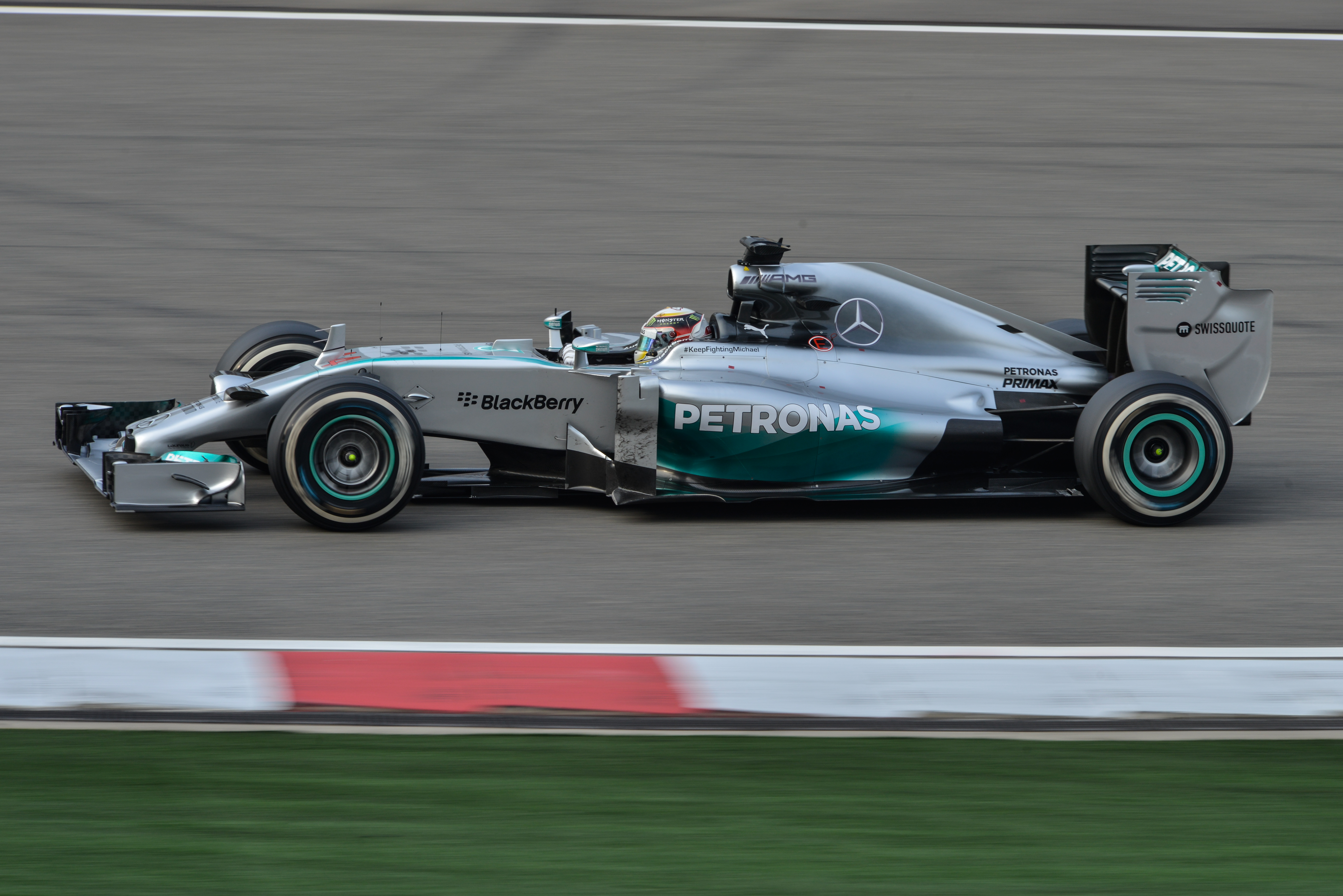
Mercedes won their first Constructors' Championship, the first of eight consecutive, with the Mercedes F1 W05 Hybrid.

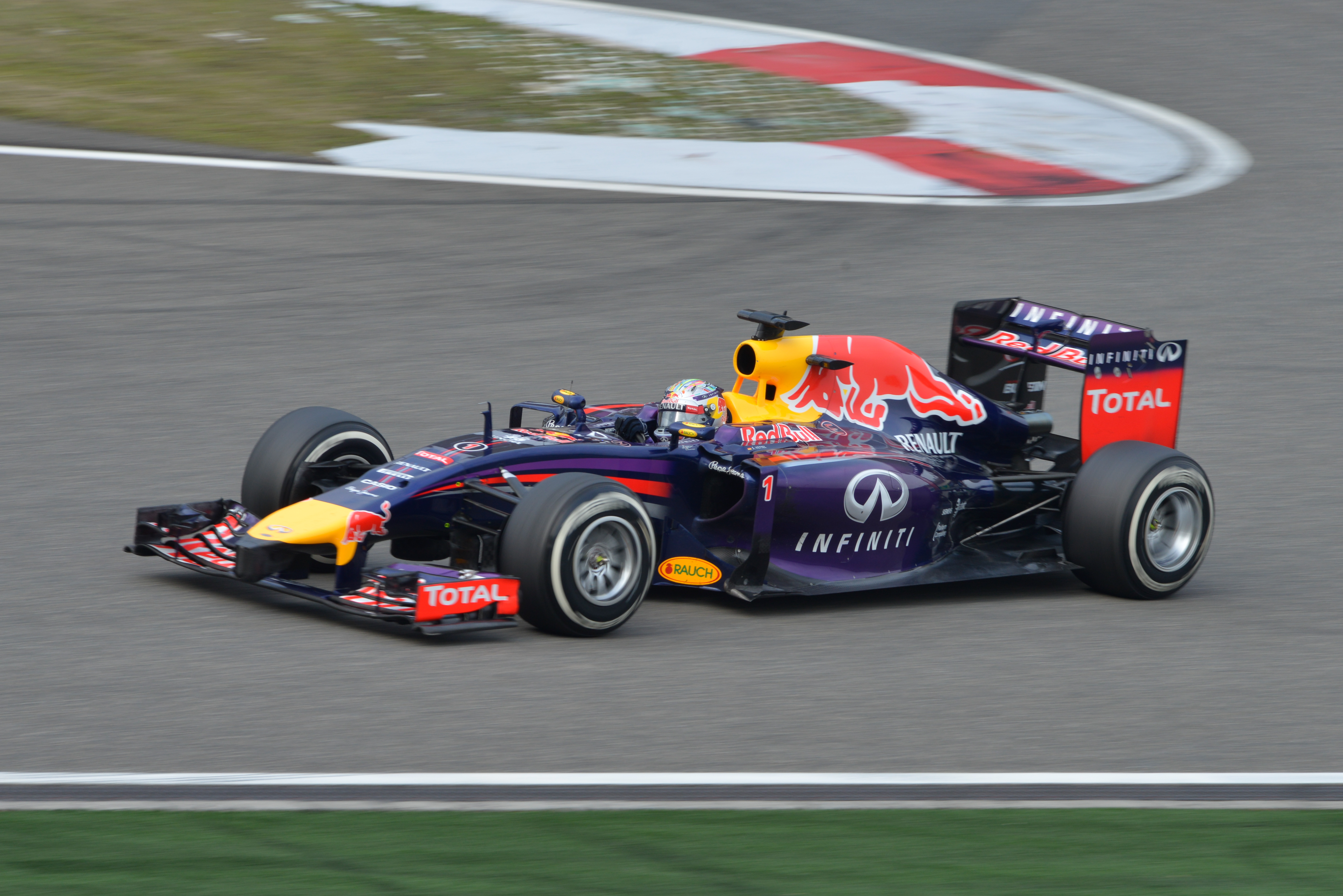
Red Bull Racing, the defending Constructors' Champions, finished second in the Constructors' Championship with the Red Bull RB10.

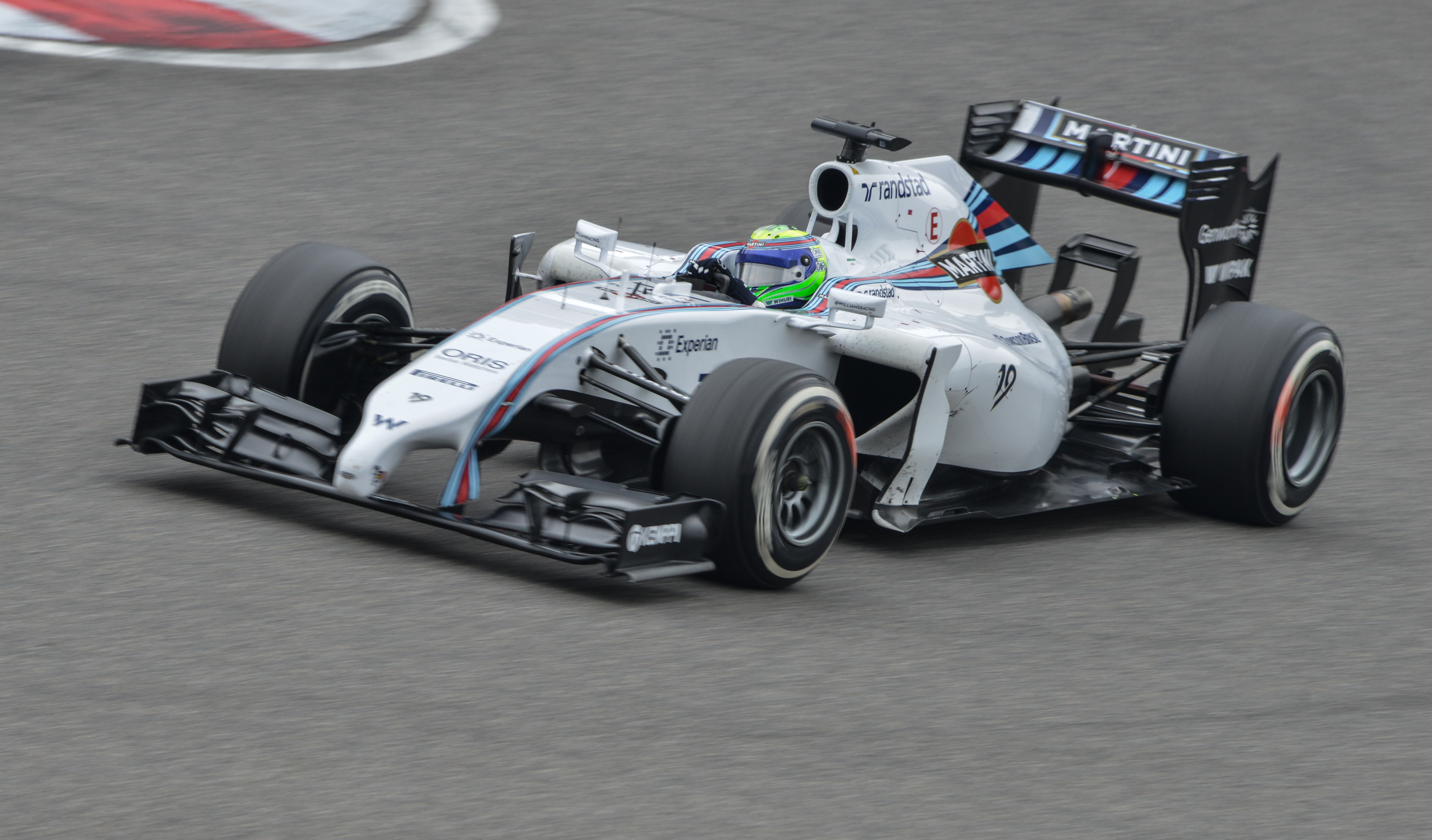
Williams finished third in the Constructors' Championship with the Williams FW36.

The 2014 FIA Formula One World Championship was the 68th season of FIA Formula One motor racing. It featured the 65th Formula One World Championship, a motor racing championship for Formula One cars, recognised by the sport's governing body, the Fédération Internationale de l'Automobile (FIA), as the highest class of competition for open-wheel racing cars. The season commenced in Australia on 16 March and concluded in Abu Dhabi on 23 November. In the nineteen Grands Prix of the season, a total of eleven teams and twenty-four drivers competed for the World Drivers' and World Constructors' championships. The season was the first Formula One season since 1994 to see an accident with fatal consequences as Jules Bianchi died on 17 July 2015 after spending nine months in a coma following a crash at the 2014 Japanese Grand Prix.

In 2014, the championship saw the introduction of a revised engine formula, in which the 2.4-litre V8 engine configuration—previously used between 2006 and 2013—was replaced with a new formula specifying a 1.6-litre (97.6 cu in) turbocharged V6 engine that incorporated an energy recovery system into its build. The 2014 calendar featured substantial revisions from the 2013 season; the Russian Grand Prix (held the first time in a century) was held at the Sochi Autodrom, and the Austrian Grand Prix was revived with the race held at the Red Bull Ring in Spielberg. The Indian Grand Prix was put on hiatus before being removed from the schedule entirely along with the Korean Grand Prix.

Sebastian Vettel started the season as defending World Drivers' Champion having secured his fourth consecutive Drivers' title the previous season at the 2013 Indian Grand Prix. His team, Infiniti Red Bull Racing, also started the season as defending World Constructors' Champions having secured its fourth consecutive Constructors' title last season at the same Grand Prix in which its lead driver secured his title.

Mercedes driver Lewis Hamilton won his second World Drivers' Championship - his first for Mercedes, having previously won his first title in 2008 with McLaren and becoming only the second driver to win the title for the Silver Arrows since Juan Manuel Fangio did so in 1955 - with 384 points and 11 victories ahead of his teammate, Nico Rosberg with 317 points and 5 victories, ending Red Bull's 4 year championship dominance (which started in 2010). Rosberg also won the inaugural FIA Pole Trophy having amassed a total of 11 pole positions over the course of the season. Mercedes secured their first World Constructors' Championship as a full works constructor in Russia, and finished the season with 701 points, 296 points ahead of Infiniti Red Bull Racing. The season also saw the first three wins of Daniel Ricciardo, who finished third in the championship for Infiniti Red Bull Racing. Meanwhile, Ricciardo's teammate and defending champion Vettel endured a winless season making the German driver the first defending champion since Jacques Villeneuve in 1998 to have this unwanted distinction and last to date, as of 2026.

== Teams and drivers ==
The following teams and drivers took part in the 2014 season. All teams competed with tyres supplied by Pirelli.

| Entrant | Constructor | Chassis | Power unit | No. | Race drivers | Rounds |
|---|---|---|---|---|---|---|
| (Malaysia) Caterham F1 Team | Caterham-Renault | CT05 | Renault Energy; F1-2014 | 9 | (Sweden) Marcus Ericsson | 1–16 |
| (Malaysia) Caterham F1 Team | Caterham-Renault | CT05 | Renault Energy; F1-2014 | 10 | (Japan) Kamui Kobayashi | 1–11, 13–16, 19 |
| (Malaysia) Caterham F1 Team | Caterham-Renault | CT05 | Renault Energy; F1-2014 | 45 | (Germany) André Lotterer | 12 |
| (Malaysia) Caterham F1 Team | Caterham-Renault | CT05 | Renault Energy; F1-2014 | 46 | (United Kingdom) Will Stevens | 19 |
| (Italy) Scuderia Ferrari | Ferrari | F14 T | Ferrari 059/3 | 7 | (Finland) Kimi Räikkönen | All |
| (Italy) Scuderia Ferrari | Ferrari | F14 T | Ferrari 059/3 | 14 | (Spain) Fernando Alonso | All |
| Sahara Force India F1 Team | Force India-Mercedes | VJM07 | Mercedes PU106A Hybrid | 11 | (Mexico) Sergio Pérez | All; All |
| Sahara Force India F1 Team | Force India-Mercedes | VJM07 | Mercedes PU106A Hybrid | 27 | (Germany) Nico Hülkenberg | All |
| (United Kingdom) Lotus F1 Team | Lotus-Renault | E22 | Renault Energy; F1-2014 | 8 | (France) Romain Grosjean | All |
| (United Kingdom) Lotus F1 Team | Lotus-Renault | E22 | Renault Energy; F1-2014 | 13 | (Venezuela) Pastor Maldonado | All |
| (Russia) Marussia F1 Team | Marussia-Ferrari | MR03 | Ferrari 059/3 | 4 | (United Kingdom) Max Chilton | 1–16 |
| (Russia) Marussia F1 Team | Marussia-Ferrari | MR03 | Ferrari 059/3 | 17 | (France) Jules Bianchi | 1–15 |
| (Russia) Marussia F1 Team | Marussia-Ferrari | MR03 | Ferrari 059/3 | 42 | (United States) Alexander Rossi | 12, 16 (Note: Alexander Rossi was entered into the Belgian Grand Prix, but withdrew after taking part in free practice. Rossi was also entered into the Russian Grand Prix, but withdrew before free practice began.) |
| (United Kingdom) McLaren Mercedes | McLaren-Mercedes | MP4-29 | Mercedes PU106A Hybrid | 20 | (Denmark) Kevin Magnussen | All |
| (United Kingdom) McLaren Mercedes | McLaren-Mercedes | MP4-29 | Mercedes PU106A Hybrid | 22 | (United Kingdom) Jenson Button | All |
| (Germany) Mercedes AMG Petronas F1 Team | Mercedes | F1 W05; Hybrid | Mercedes PU106A Hybrid | 6 | (Germany) Nico Rosberg | All |
| (Germany) Mercedes AMG Petronas F1 Team | Mercedes | F1 W05; Hybrid | Mercedes PU106A Hybrid | 44 | (United Kingdom) Lewis Hamilton | All |
| (Austria) Infiniti Red Bull Racing Renault | Red Bull-Renault | RB10 | Renault Energy; F1-2014 | 1 | (Germany) Sebastian Vettel | All |
| (Austria) Infiniti Red Bull Racing Renault | Red Bull-Renault | RB10 | Renault Energy; F1-2014 | 3 | (Australia) Daniel Ricciardo | All |
| (Switzerland) Sauber F1 Team | Sauber-Ferrari | C33 | Ferrari 059/3 | 21 | (Mexico) Esteban Gutiérrez | All |
| (Switzerland) Sauber F1 Team | Sauber-Ferrari | C33 | Ferrari 059/3 | 99 | (Germany) Adrian Sutil | All |
| (Italy) Scuderia Toro Rosso | Toro Rosso-Renault | STR9 | Renault Energy; F1-2014 | 25 | (France) Jean-Éric Vergne | All |
| (Italy) Scuderia Toro Rosso | Toro Rosso-Renault | STR9 | Renault Energy; F1-2014 | 26 | (Russia) Daniil Kvyat | All |
| (United Kingdom) Williams Martini Racing | Williams-Mercedes | FW36 | Mercedes PU106A Hybrid | 19 | (Brazil) Felipe Massa | All |
| (United Kingdom) Williams Martini Racing | Williams-Mercedes | FW36 | Mercedes PU106A Hybrid | 77 | (Finland) Valtteri Bottas | All |

This was the final season for Max Chilton, Jean-Éric Vergne, Kamui Kobayashi, Adrian Sutil, and Jules Bianchi, the latter of whom had a test driver contract for 2015, but suffered an accident leading to fatal injuries at the 2014 Japanese Grand Prix.

=== Free practice drivers ===
6 teams used free practice drivers over the course of the season.

Drivers that took part in free practice sessions
| Constructor | Practice drivers | | |
| Constructor | No. | Driver name | Rounds |
|---|---|---|---|
| Caterham-Renault | 46; 45; 45 | (Netherlands) Robin Frijns (United States) Alexander Rossi (Spain) Roberto Merhi | 3, 9; 7; 13, 15–16 |
| Force India-Mercedes | 34 | (Spain) Daniel Juncadella | 9, 13, 18 |
| Lotus–Renault | 30; 31 | (France) Charles Pic (France) Esteban Ocon | 13; 19 |
| Sauber-Ferrari | 36; 37; 37 | (Netherlands) Giedo van der Garde (Russia) Sergey Sirotkin (Hong Kong) Adderly Fong | 3–5, 9–10, 12–13; 16; 19 |
| Toro Rosso-Renault | 38 | (Netherlands) Max Verstappen | 15, 17–18 |
| Williams-Mercedes | 40; 41 | (Brazil) Felipe Nasr (United Kingdom) Susie Wolff | 3–5, 17–18; 9–10 |

=== Team changes ===
- Cosworth elected not to build an engine to fit the 2014 generation of regulations. This decision prompted Marussia, the only team using Cosworth engines during the 2013 season, to seek out a new engine supplier. They joined Ferrari's customer programme with Ferrari providing the team with both engine and powertrain for 2014 and beyond.
- Toro Rosso secured an agreement with Renault for engines in 2014, ending their seven-year arrangement with Ferrari.
- Williams parted ways with Renault after two seasons, switching to Mercedes power in what the team described as a "long-term deal". The deal came after Renault publicised their intentions to reduce their engine supply to three teams in 2014, before the French manufacturer ultimately settled on supplying four.
- In 2011, former BAR team principal Craig Pollock announced the formation of Propulsion Universelle et Récuperation d'Énergie—commonly known by its acronym, PURE—and signalled his intentions to enter the sport in 2014 as a customer engine supplier, with the full support of the FIA. However, the engine programme was eventually suspended in July 2012 due to problems regarding funding, and was ultimately unable to secure any clients for the 2014 season.

=== Driver changes ===
- 2008 runner-up Felipe Massa left Ferrari at the end of the 2013 season after eight years racing for the team. He moved to Williams, alongside Valtteri Bottas. Pastor Maldonado, having been replaced at Williams by Massa, moved to Lotus F1, taking the seat vacated by 2007 World Champion Kimi Räikkönen. Räikkönen returned to Ferrari, the team he raced for from 2007 to 2009. The partnership of Räikkönen and Fernando Alonso marked the first time since 1954 that Ferrari contested a season with two World Drivers' Champions in the team.
- Mark Webber retired from Formula One after twelve seasons, the last seven with Red Bull Racing. He moved to the FIA World Endurance Championship. Daniel Ricciardo left Scuderia Toro Rosso to fill his seat, becoming the second driver to graduate from the team's young driver programme to their premier racing team. Toro Rosso chose 2013 GP3 Series champion Daniil Kvyat as Ricciardo's replacement.
- Sergio Pérez left McLaren after a single season with the team. He was replaced by 2013 Formula Renault 3.5 champion and McLaren Young Driver Programme member Kevin Magnussen. Pérez moved to Force India, where he was joined by Nico Hülkenberg, who returned to the team after one year with Sauber. As a result of the Hülkenberg and Pérez deals, Paul di Resta and Adrian Sutil lost their seats with the team. Sutil went on to secure Hülkenberg's vacant seat at Sauber, while di Resta left Formula One entirely and returned to the DTM series, the series he competed in prior to joining Formula One.
- Kamui Kobayashi returned to Formula One with Caterham, after spending the 2013 season competing in the World Endurance Championship. He was partnered with GP2 Series regular Marcus Ericsson, who became the first Swedish driver in Formula One since Stefan Johansson retired from the sport in 1991. The decision left both Giedo van der Garde and Charles Pic without a drive, and both went on to take reserve driver roles with other teams; van der Garde joined Sauber, while Pic moved to Lotus.
- Susie Wolff joined Williams as a test and reserve driver, with a programme that included participation in selected Free Practice 1 sessions. In doing so, she became the first female driver to take part in a Grand Prix weekend since Giovanna Amati failed to qualify for the 1992 Brazilian Grand Prix.
- On 3 October 2014, Max Verstappen became the youngest driver to participate in a Formula One Grand Prix weekend (17 years, 3 days), driving in FP1 at the Japanese Grand Prix, deputising in place of Toro Rosso's Jean-Eric Vergne.

=== Mid-season changes ===
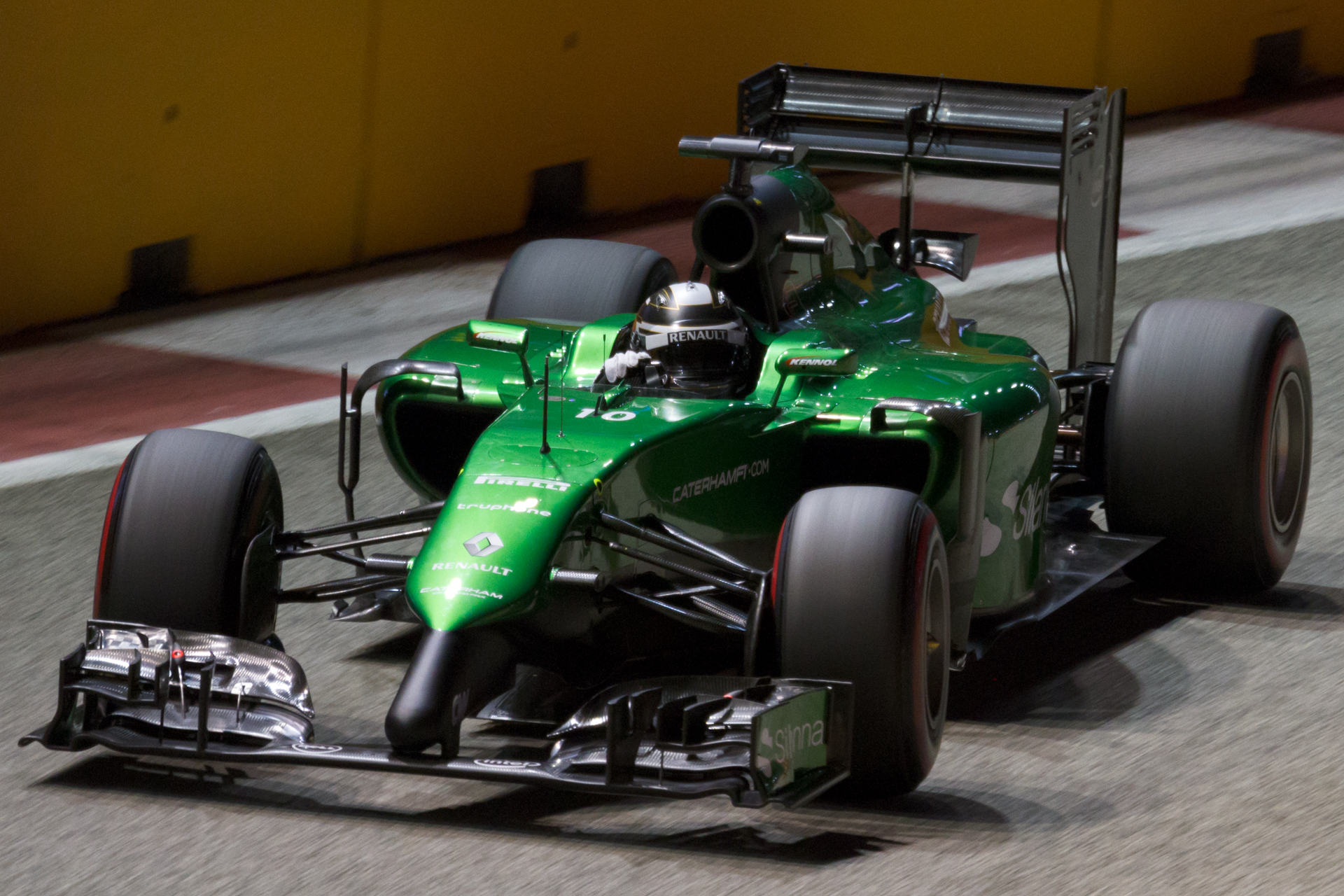

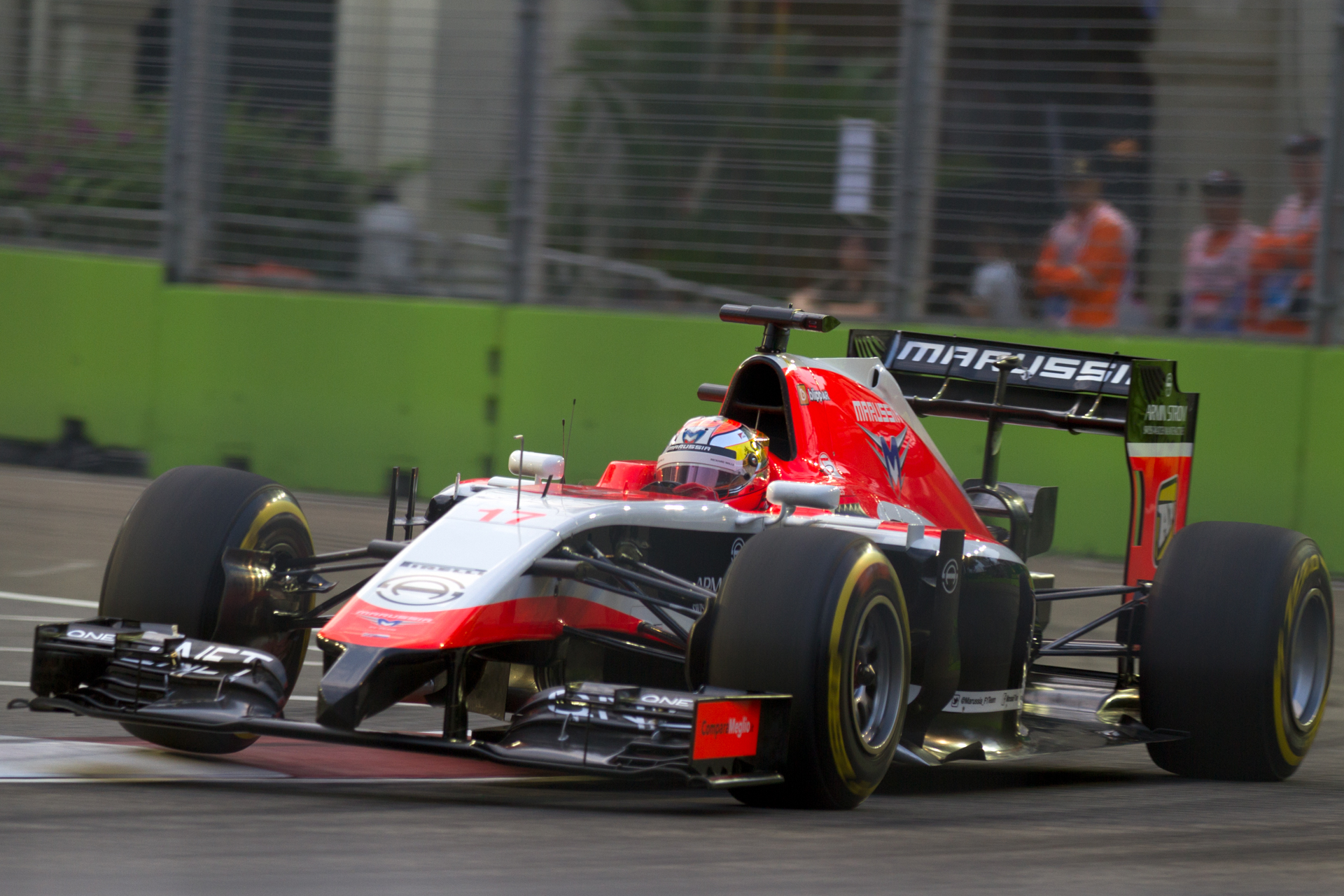
Caterham (top) and Marussia (bottom)—both seen here at the Singapore Grand Prix—went into administration late in the season.

- In the week leading up to the British Grand Prix, the Caterham F1 Team announced that team owner Tony Fernandes had sold his controlling stake to a consortium of Swiss and Middle Eastern investors. Former Midland and Spyker driver Christijan Albers was appointed as team principal, with the team declaring its intentions to continue competing under the Caterham name. Albers was himself replaced by Manfredi Ravetto, who admitted that the sale was necessary to keep the team on the grid. Ravetto was in turn replaced, this time by Finbarr O'Connell, who was appointed when the team was placed into administration ahead of the United States Grand Prix due to a dispute over the team's ownership. The team was later given a dispensation to miss the United States and Brazilian Grands Prix in order to resolve the dispute.
- Three-time 24 Hours of Le Mans winner and 2011 Formula Nippon (now Super Formula) champion André Lotterer made his Formula One debut with Caterham, replacing Kamui Kobayashi at the Belgian Grand Prix. Under the terms of the deal, Kobayashi returned to the team for the Italian Grand Prix, while Lotterer returned to Super Formula. The team had further planned to substitute Kobayashi for Formula One's most experienced driver in history, Rubens Barrichello, in the United States, Brazilian and Abu Dhabi Grands Prix, but were forced to abandon the plan when they entered administration. The team ultimately put together a rescue package ahead of the Abu Dhabi Grand Prix, but with Marcus Ericsson formally leaving the team ahead of a move to Sauber in 2015, Caterham chose debutant Will Stevens as his replacement.
- Alexander Rossi was entered for the Belgian Grand Prix by Marussia as a replacement for Max Chilton. However, following the first practice session, Chilton was reinstated as the team's racing driver, and Rossi only participated in the practice session. Rossi was later nominated as Jules Bianchi's replacement for the Russian Grand Prix, but the entry was ultimately withdrawn out of respect for the critically injured Bianchi.
- Jules Bianchi suffered a serious head injury in a crash at the Japanese Grand Prix, remaining hospitalised and in a coma until his death in July 2015. Marussia decided to withdraw their second entry for the Russian Grand Prix, Alexander Rossi, out of respect for the Frenchman. Faced with their own financial problems, the team was also granted a dispensation to miss the United States Grand Prix. One week before the Grand Prix, Marussia followed Caterham into administration.

== Calendar ==
Nations that hosted a Grand Prix in 2014 are highlighted in green, with former host nations shown in gray.

The following nineteen Grands Prix took place in 2014.

| Round | Grand Prix | Circuit | Date |
|---|---|---|---|
| 1 | Australian Grand Prix | (Australia) Albert Park Circuit, Melbourne | 16 March |
| 2 | Malaysian Grand Prix | (Malaysia) Sepang International Circuit, Kuala Lumpur | 30 March |
| 3 | Bahrain Grand Prix | Bahrain International Circuit, Sakhir | 6 April |
| 4 | Chinese Grand Prix | (China) Shanghai International Circuit, Shanghai | 20 April |
| 5 | Spanish Grand Prix | (Spain) Circuit de Barcelona-Catalunya, Montmeló | 11 May |
| 6 | Monaco Grand Prix | Circuit de Monaco, Monte Carlo | 25 May |
| 7 | Canadian Grand Prix | (Canada) Circuit Gilles Villeneuve, Montreal | 8 June |
| 8 | Austrian Grand Prix | (Austria) Red Bull Ring, Spielberg | 22 June |
| 9 | British Grand Prix | (United Kingdom) Silverstone Circuit, Silverstone | 6 July |
| 10 | German Grand Prix | (Germany) Hockenheimring, Hockenheim | 20 July |
| 11 | Hungarian Grand Prix | (Hungary) Hungaroring, Mogyoród | 27 July |
| 12 | Belgian Grand Prix | (Belgium) Circuit de Spa-Francorchamps, Stavelot | 24 August |
| 13 | Italian Grand Prix | (Italy) Autodromo Nazionale di Monza, Monza | 7 September |
| 14 | Singapore Grand Prix | Marina Bay Street Circuit, Singapore | 21 September |
| 15 | Japanese Grand Prix | (Japan) Suzuka Circuit, Suzuka | 5 October |
| 16 | Russian Grand Prix | (Russia) Sochi Autodrom, Sochi | 12 October |
| 17 | United States Grand Prix | (United States) Circuit of the Americas, Austin, Texas | 2 November |
| 18 | Brazilian Grand Prix | (Brazil) Autódromo José Carlos Pace, São Paulo | 9 November |
| 19 | Abu Dhabi Grand Prix | (United Arab Emirates) Yas Marina Circuit, Abu Dhabi | 23 November |

=== Calendar changes ===
==== New and returning races ====
In 2014 Formula One travelled to Russia for the first time, with the Russian Grand Prix at a street circuit in the Sochi Olympic Park.

- Red Bull reached an agreement with Bernie Ecclestone to revive the Austrian Grand Prix after a ten-year absence from the calendar. The race was held at the Red Bull Ring, which previously hosted the Austrian Grand Prix in 2003, when the circuit was known as the A1-Ring.
- The calendar saw the introduction of the Russian Grand Prix with the race staged at the Sochi Autodrom near the end of the season. The race took place on a street circuit constructed around the Sochi Olympic Park. It was the first Russian Grand Prix in a century, and the first time the country had ever hosted a round of the Formula One World Championship. The International Olympic Committee had cautioned that it would use its power to delay the race until 2015 if it felt that construction of the circuit and facilities were disrupting preparations for the 2014 Winter Olympic Games, but this proved not to be an issue.
- The Hockenheimring returned to the calendar to host the German Grand Prix, in keeping with the event-sharing agreement first established in 2008 with the Nürburgring for the two circuits to host the Grand Prix in alternating years. The Hockenheimring last hosted a Grand Prix in 2012.

==== Failed bids ====
- The Indian Grand Prix was not held in 2014 following the devaluation of the Indian rupee and ongoing complications arising from Indian taxation laws, which had dogged the event since its inaugural race in 2011, with authorities classifying the Grand Prix as "entertainment", which under Indian law would have entitled the authorities to claim a portion of the teams' revenue as tax for competing in India, something they would have been unable to do if the race had been classified as a "sport". The race promoters initially came to an agreement with Bernie Ecclestone to skip the 2014 event and return to the calendar early in 2015; however, in March 2014, Ecclestone stated that the race would likely be pushed back to 2016 while the sport tried to resolve the taxation issue. As of 2026, the Indian Grand Prix has yet to see a return to the Formula 1 schedule.
- The Korean Grand Prix, Mexican Grand Prix, and the Grand Prix of America were included in the provisional calendar published in September 2013, but were later removed from the final calendar released in December.

==== Other changes ====
- The Bahrain Grand Prix was held as a night event under lights, similar to the Singapore Grand Prix. The decision to hold the race under lights was taken as a means of marking the tenth anniversary of the event.
- The United States Grand Prix had been provisionally scheduled for 9 November. However, the date coincided with a University of Texas American football team home game, which would have strained Austin's tourism infrastructure.

== Regulation changes ==
=== Technical regulations ===
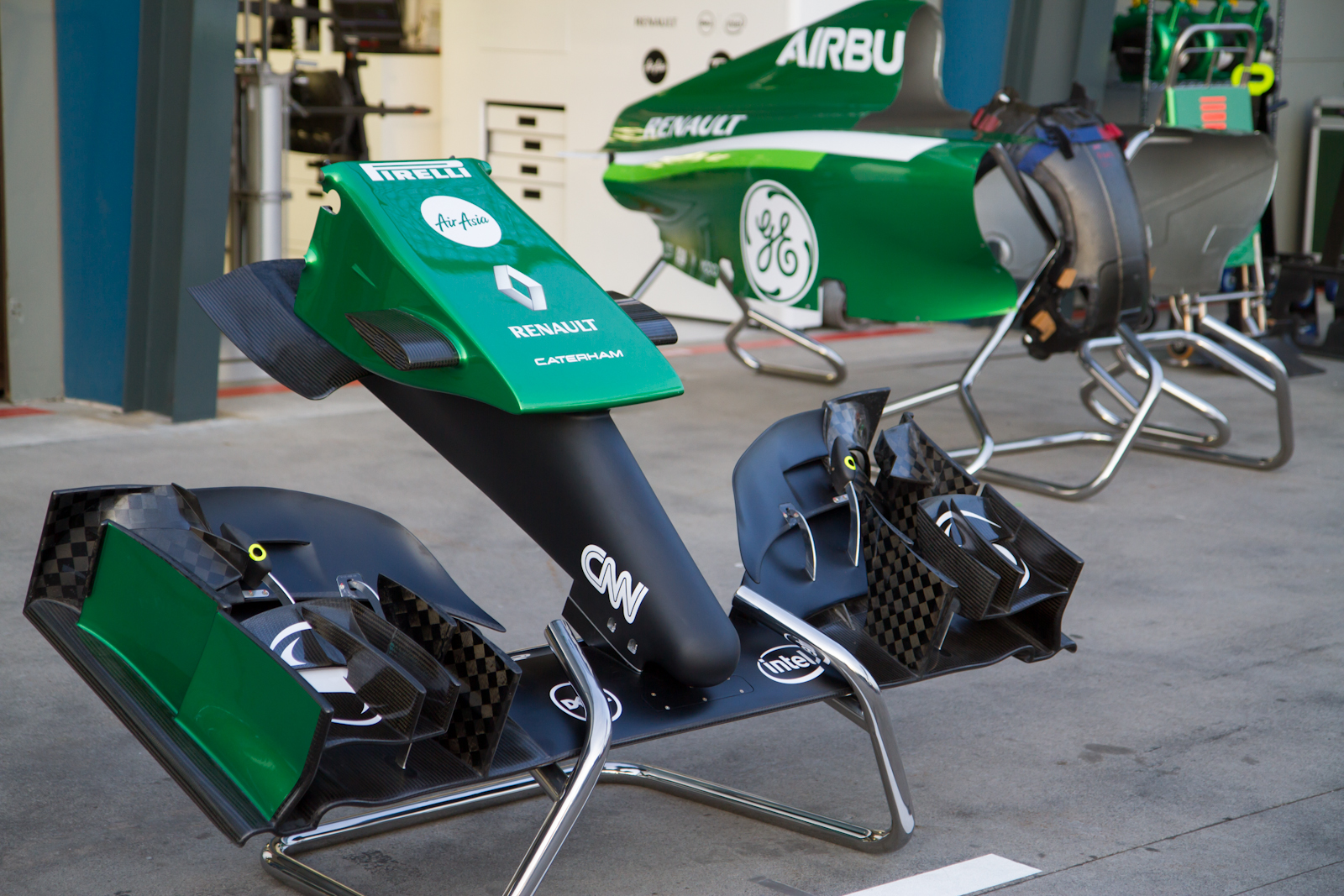
Car aesthetics proved controversial in 2014, with the demand for a low nose resulting in teams designing cars with a finger-like appendage—seen here in the nose of the Caterham CT05—dubbed the "alien" at the front of the chassis due to its resemblance to a Xenomorph's mouth.

- The 2014 season saw the introduction of a new engine formula, with turbocharged engines returning to the sport for the first time since 1988. The new engines were a 1.6-litre V6 format with an 8-speed semi-automatic gearbox. The traditional 2.4 litres (146 cubic inches) naturally-aspirated V8 engines that were used since 2006 (and later became mandatory for all entrants since 2007) until 2013 were permanently retired. The rules dictated the use of a ninety-degree engine bank, with fixed crankshaft and mounting points for the chassis, while the engines were limited to 15,000 rpm. Individual engine units under the 2014 specifications had to last for at least 4,000 km (2,500 mi) before being replaced, in comparison to the pre-2014 engines, which were required to last for just 2,000 km (1,200 mi). The engines, now known as "power units", were divided into six separate components: the internal combustion engine (ICE); turbocharger (TC); Motor Generator Unit-Kinetic (MGU-K), which harvested energy that would normally be wasted under braking; Motor Generator Unit-Heat (MGU-H), which collected energy in the form of heat as it was expelled through the exhaust; Energy Store (ES), which functioned as batteries, holding the energy gathered by the Motor Generator Units; and Control Electronics (CE), which included the Electronic Control Unit and software used to manage the entire power unit.
  - Under the previous generation of engines, used from 2006 to 2013, engines were subject to a development "freeze", which prohibited manufacturers from upgrading their engines. Faced with the complexity of the 2014 engines, the engine freeze was replaced with a points-trading system to prevent manufacturers from being unable to develop or improve their engines. Under the system, the individual parts of the engine were classified as Tier 1, Tier 2 and Tier 3, and were assigned a points value there within. Engine manufacturers were given a budget of sixty-six points, which they were free to spend on engine development, with points deducted from their budget depending on the parts developed.
- The kinetic energy recovery system—known from 2009 to 2013 as KERS, and renamed from 2014 as ERS-K—was incorporated into the design of the engine and its usage increased; its function as a supplementary power source was taken by the introduction of the heat-based energy recovery system (ERS). The ERS unit captured waste heat as it was dispelled from the exhaust turbocharger, using an electrical device known as a heat motor generator unit. This waste heat was stored as an electrical charge until it was used by a complementary system called the kinetic motor generator unit. This device was connected directly to the drive train to deliver the additional power in the most direct and efficient way. In combination with the ERS-K it gave drivers an additional 161 bhp (120 kW) for thirty-three seconds per lap, compared to the KERS units used prior to 2014, which gave drivers 80 bhp (60 kW) for six seconds per lap. This energy was released into the powertrain by the electronic control unit (ECU) to promote the most efficient and effective application of the power, but the driver had the ability to manually override the ECU and use the remaining available power instantly.
- Teams were permitted to use electronic braking devices to manage the braking of the rear wheels as the increased power output from the ERS-K units made regulating the brake bias much harder than it had been previously.
- Teams were no longer allowed to change their gear ratios from race to race to suit the individual demands of a circuit. Instead, they had to nominate eight gear ratios ahead of the first race of the season, and these eight ratios were used at every Grand Prix. They were given one opportunity to change their ratios once the season had started, but any subsequent changes would have incurred a grid penalty.
- Lower noses returned for the first time since the 2010 season. The 2014 regulations required the use of lower noses than in previous years, in the interests of driver safety. The tip of the nose had to be no more than 185 mm (7.3 in) above the ground, in comparison to the 550 mm (22 in) allowed in 2012. These regulations were amended in June 2013 so as to completely outlaw the use of the "stepped noses" used in 2012 and 2013, thereby forcing teams to design a car with a genuinely lower nose rather than using the temporary solution.
  - The original rules—first published in August 2011—also called for a variety of bodywork changes aimed at cutting downforce, most notably through the use of narrower front wings, and a shallower angle to the main plane of rear wings. These additional changes were formally abandoned in December 2012, but the requirement that cars be built with a nose no more than 185mm above the ground was retained. The planned reduction in front wing width from 1,800 mm (71 in) to 1,650 mm (65 in) was subsequently reintroduced.
- Teams were no longer able to use a beam wing at the rear of the car, a small carbon fibre wing mounted above the diffuser designed to generate low pressure as air passed over it, allowing them greater control over the air that was being deliberately directed over the diffuser.
- To promote fuel efficiency and limit horsepower levels seen in the 1980s, the last time Formula One used forced induction engines, fuel flow was restricted to 100 kg/h above 10,500 rpm; below 10,500 rpm a formula for the maximum flow was applied based on the rpm in use.
  - Following Daniel Ricciardo's disqualification from the Australian Grand Prix for exceeding the fuel-flow limit, the FIA issued a Technical Directive preventing teams from making modifications to their fuel sensors after an investigation into the problem found that compounds in the bespoke fuel used by some teams were corroding a rubber seal in the sensor, leading to anomalous readings.
- The position of the exhaust outlet changed so that it was now angled upwards toward the rear wing instead of downwards to face the rear diffuser so as to make the practice of using exhaust blown diffusers—passing exhaust gasses over the rear diffuser to improve the car's downforce—extremely difficult to achieve.
- The minimum weight of the cars was increased from 642 kg (1,415 lb) to 691 kg (1,523 lb) to account for the increased weight of the engine, energy recovery units, and 2014 specification of tyres.
- In the week following the British Grand Prix, the FIA announced a total ban on the Front-and-Rear Interconnected suspension system (commonly abbreviated as FRIC) starting with immediate effect on the grounds that it was a movable aerodynamic device under Article 3.15 of the technical regulations. The FRIC system linked the front and rear suspension arrays together, using inertia to transfer hydraulic fluid across the car to offset the effects of weight transfer on the car under braking, acceleration and cornering, thereby creating a static ride height and improving stability.
- The use of false camera mountings was banned. Teams had previously exploited a loophole in the regulations that allowed them to add additional pieces of bodywork to the car in the place of camera mountings and take advantage of the aerodynamic benefits. From 2014, this loophole was closed, with the regulations rewritten to only allow camera mountings to be used for cameras. This rule was later updated to force the teams to mount the cameras on an external piece of bodywork after Red Bull fitted its cameras within the nose of the RB10 chassis.

=== Sporting regulations ===
- Mid-season testing returned in 2014. Three European venues each hosted a two-day test in the week following the Grand Prix held at the circuit with one test being held in the week after the final round in Abu Dhabi. In addition to this, teams had to dedicate one of these days to aiding tyre supplier Pirelli in the development of their tyres. These rules were later adjusted to allow teams to choose which venues they tested at during the season. Additionally, cars were also classified as "current", "previous" and "historic", with the FIA introducing limits on which cars could be used and the conditions under which they were tested. The end-of-season Young Driver Tests, which were held to give teams the opportunity to assess rookie drivers, were discontinued.
- The penalty system was overhauled in 2014 so as to improve driving standards, with the introduction of a "penalty points" system for driving offences. Under the system, driving offences carried a pre-determined points value based on their severity. These points were tallied up over the course of a season, with a driver receiving a race ban after accumulating twelve penalty points. Any driver who received a race ban would also have received an additional five penalty points upon their return, as a form of probation to discourage further driving offences. Penalty points remained on a driver's licence for twelve months, at which point they will have been removed.
  - Stewards were given the power to hand out five-second penalties in addition to the existing range of penalties within their power. The five-second penalties were introduced for situations where a penalty was justified, but the existing penalties—such as a drive-through or a stop/go penalty—were considered too severe, or where such a penalty would radically alter the outcome of a race if applied retroactively, with penalised drivers facing the loss of championship points for otherwise minor violations of the rules. Drivers were permitted to serve these penalties before a regular pit stop, with the driver stopping in their pit bay for five seconds before any work was carried out on the car. The five-second penalty could also be added to a driver's total race time in the event that it was issued after they had made their final pit stop. Drivers serving drive-through or stop/go penalties were still not permitted to serve a penalty ahead of their pit stop, and were instead required to enter the pit lane separately to serve the penalty.
- The rules regarding unsafe pit releases—when a car is released from its pit bay to the lane directly into the path of an oncoming car—were rewritten, with the driver who was released in an unsafe fashion given a grid penalty for the next race.
- The pit lane speed limit was reduced from 100 km/h (62 mph) to 80 km/h (50 mph).
- Drivers were only able to use five engines over the course of a season in 2014, down from eight in 2013. Drivers who used a sixth engine started the race from the pit lane, as opposed to the ten-place grid penalty handed down for going over the engine quota in previous season. Drivers were only able to use five individual components of each power unit element over the course of the season. If a driver went over this quota for any individual element, they incurred a ten-place grid penalty. They would receive a further five-place penalty for going over the five-unit allocation of any other element after the original ten-place penalty was applied in a bid to stop teams changing multiple elements of the engine unit after receiving a grid penalty.
  - In the event that such a penalty relegated a driver past the back row of the grid, the remaining penalty carried over to the next race. For example, if a driver qualified in nineteenth position and received a five-place grid penalty, they dropped to twenty-second and last place for that race, and then would receive an additional two-place penalty in the next Grand Prix. These penalties could only be carried over to the next race, rather than accumulate, and only applied to penalties issued for going over the component quota. Penalties cannot be carried over from season to season; when a driver incurred such a penalty during the final race of the season, the stewards had the power to issue time penalties during the race.
- The procedure for issuing penalties for speeding under yellow flag conditions in qualifying was changed for 2014. Previously, drivers had been forced to slow down in the timing sector of the circuit where a yellow flag was being waved. However, after a series of penalties were issued to drivers for speeding in a sector with yellow flags when the incident that triggered the yellow flag took place behind them, the FIA introduced a change to the procedure. Starting in 2014, the circuits were divided into two hundred metre intervals. In the event of a yellow flag, drivers had to demonstrate that they slowed down in the two hundred metres immediately before and after the yellow flags while they were being displayed, or else incurred a penalty.
  - Following Jules Bianchi's accident at the Japanese Grand Prix, the FIA announced plans to introduce a mandatory speed limiter to cars that could be remotely activated from Race Control in the event of a yellow flag. Labelled "Virtual Safety Car" (VSC), the system is an alternative to the use of an actual safety car and was first tested during practice at the United States Grand Prix. The system originally aimed at restricting drivers to a 100 km/h (62 mph) speed limit under specific yellow flag situations, following reports that Bianchi had been travelling at 212 km/h (132 mph) when he left the circuit. Similar trials were conducted in Brazil and Abu Dhabi, with VSC ultimately being managed through specified sector (delta) times rather than a speed limit in affected sectors.
- Following a series of high-profile incidents involving tyres throughout the 2013 season that culminated in a string of explosive blow-outs at the 2013 British Grand Prix, the FIA passed a resolution granting them the power to change the specifications of the tyres used by competitors with immediate effect should the need arise.
- Drivers were assigned permanent numbers for the duration of their careers, with the championship adopting a system similar to the one used in MotoGP. The number 1 was the champion's right, with drivers free to choose any number from 2 to 99; the champion's "regular" number was reserved while the champion was using the number 1. The regulations further stipulated that a driver's number had to be clearly visible, both on their car and on their helmet. Previously, the numbering system had been partially based on the World Constructors' Championship finishing positions from the previous year.
- Drivers who did not take part in a qualifying period were assigned grid positions based on the qualifying bracket they were in at the time and their Free Practice 3 lap times. For example, if two drivers qualified for but did not take part in Q3, they started the race from ninth and tenth places, with the positions they took decided by their FP3 times. The rule was rewritten as grid positions for drivers who had not set lap times or left the pits had previously been decided by car numbers.
- The FIA introduced the "Pole Trophy", a non-championship award presented to the driver who qualified on pole for the most races.
- The qualifying format was adjusted to allow drivers more time to complete flying laps in Q3. The final qualifying period was extended to twelve minutes in length, with Q1 scaled back to eighteen minutes to keep the entire session within one hour.
  - The 107% rule was relaxed at the start of the season to account for teams dealing with the challenges that arose from the new engine regulations. FIA Race Director Charlie Whiting was quoted as saying that the enforcement of the rule would be taken on a case-by-case basis, but that the stewards would consider a driver able to qualify provided they set consistent lap times in Free Practice.
- The FIA introduced a curfew system in 2011 that prohibited team personnel from accessing the circuit in the six hours before the first session of the day, with teams given four "jokers"—exceptions to the rule that allowed them to stay within the circuit boundaries past the curfew hours without penalty so as to complete work on cars—to use throughout the season. The rule was revised for 2014, with teams given six exceptions over the course of the year as a response to the introduction of the new engine formula.
- Drivers had to be able to return to the pits under their own power after the chequered flag had fallen in a bid to stop drivers from pulling over in order to preserve the mandatory one-litre fuel sample required to pass post-race scrutineering.
- Teams were now allowed to run up to four drivers during both Friday practice sessions, (Note: The first two Free Practice sessions of the Monaco Grand Prix are traditionally held on the Thursday before the race.) though they were still limited to entering a maximum of two cars during the sessions. If one of the team's nominated drivers was unable to take part, any replacement driver had to use the engine, gearbox and tyres which were allocated to the original driver.
- The final race of the season offered double points to teams and drivers in a bid to keep the championship fight alive for longer.
- Starting as of the Singapore Grand Prix, the FIA restricted pit-to-car communications, banning any radio transmissions between driver and team or pit boards displaying information that are deemed to be related to the performance of the driver or their car—such as discussing sector times relative to other cars—under Article 20.1 of the sporting regulations, which stated that a competitor must drive the car unaided.

== Season report ==
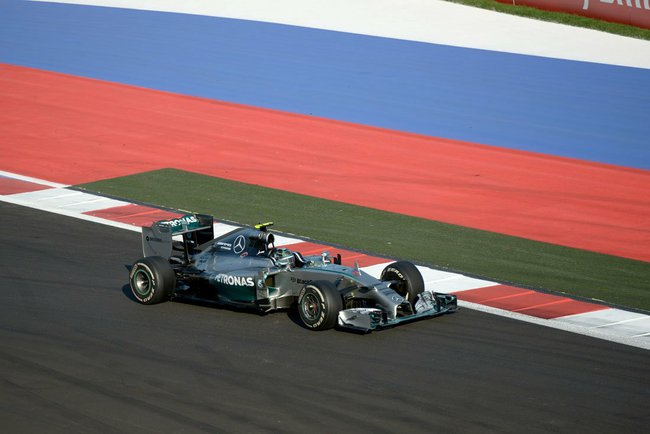
Mercedes secured their first World Constructors' Championship with a 1–2 finish in Russia.

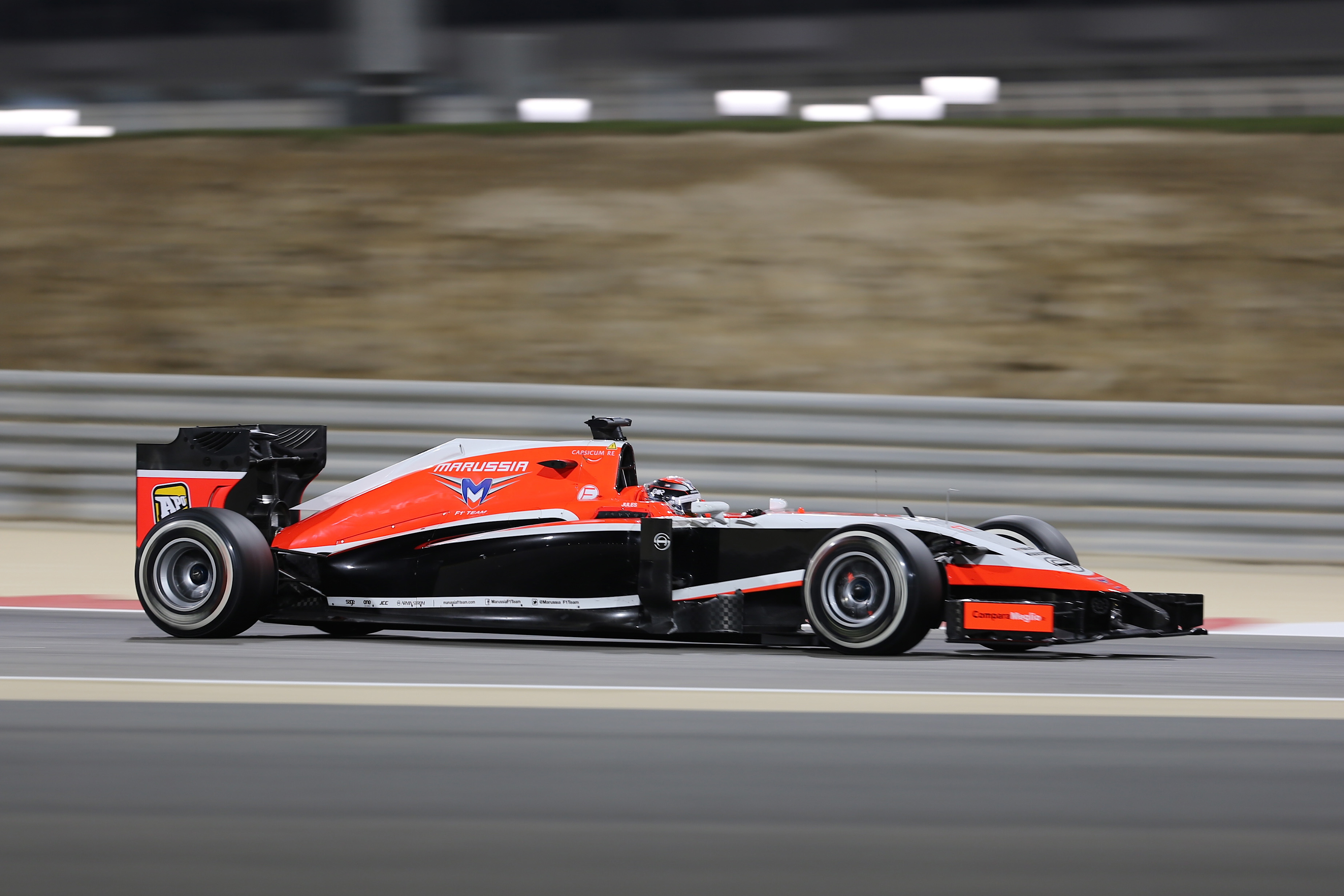
Jules Bianchi—seen here in Bahrain—scored Marussia's first and only points in Formula One at the Monaco Grand Prix. He became the first Formula One fatality since 1994 after an accident at the Japanese Grand Prix.

Mercedes won their first World Constructors' Championship after taking a 1–2 finish in Russia. Lewis Hamilton won his second World Drivers' Championship after a season-long battle with teammate Nico Rosberg. Rosberg won the Australian and Monaco Grands Prix, and Hamilton the races in Malaysia, Bahrain, China and Spain after retiring in Australia. The Mercedes team's run of victories ended in Canada where Rosberg and Hamilton were simultaneously hit with a power unit failure that put additional strain on their brakes. Hamilton was forced out of the race and while Rosberg was able to continue, his performance deteriorated and he ultimately finished second. Mercedes returned to the top of the podium in Austria, with Rosberg leading Hamilton across the finish line for his third victory of the season. Hamilton reclaimed ground in the championship standings in Britain winning after Rosberg was forced out with gearbox issues. Rosberg claimed the win in Germany, while Hamilton recovered to third after an accident in qualifying saw him start from twentieth place. Hamilton finished third in Hungary after starting from pit lane, ahead of Rosberg. Rosberg had to settle for second place in Belgium after contact with Hamilton early in the race, which ultimately prompted Mercedes to retire Hamilton's car. Hamilton went on to claim his sixth win of the season in Italy, ahead of Rosberg. Hamilton reclaimed the championship lead with a win in Singapore, while Rosberg was retired with a broken wiring loom. Hamilton claimed the win in rain- and accident-shortened Japan, ahead of Rosberg. Hamilton won the inaugural race in Russia, once again ahead of Rosberg. The result was enough for Mercedes to secure their first World Constructors' Championship. Hamilton took his fifth consecutive win – for the first time in his career – in the United States, again ahead of Rosberg. Rosberg took his fifth win of the season in Brazil, with Hamilton finishing in second. Hamilton carried a seventeen-point advantage into the title-deciding Abu Dhabi Grand Prix and went on to win the race while Rosberg struggled with electrical problems and finished outside the points. With eleven pole positions to his name, Rosberg won the inaugural FIA Pole Trophy.

Red Bull Racing finished second overall, after suffering a difficult start to the season when Sebastian Vettel retired and Daniel Ricciardo was disqualified from the Australian Grand Prix. Red Bull appealed the disqualification, but the result was upheld by the International Court of Appeal. Vettel went on to finish third in Malaysia, while Ricciardo retired, and both drivers scored points in Bahrain and China. Ricciardo recorded his first podium finish with a third place in Spain, while Vettel recovered to fourth place after technical problems and a penalty for a gearbox change saw him start the race from fifteenth position. Ricciardo finished in third place in Monaco, while Vettel retired due to an issue with his power unit. Ricciardo took advantage of the Mercedes team's difficulties in Canada to claim his maiden Grand Prix victory—and Renault's first with a turbocharged engine since the 1986 Detroit Grand Prix—while Vettel finished third. The team struggled in their home race in Austria, with Vettel retiring early with yet another engine issue and Ricciardo finishing eighth. Ricciardo returned to the podium in Britain, while Vettel finished fifth after a protracted battle with Alonso. Vettel and Ricciardo were fourth and sixth respectively in Germany. Ricciardo scored his second career win in Hungary, while Vettel finished seventh after a spin. Ricciardo scored his third career victory in Belgium while Vettel took fifth. In Italy, Ricciardo took fifth place, ahead of Vettel. Both drivers recorded podium finishes in Singapore. Vettel took to the podium with third place in Japan, ahead of Ricciardo. Ricciardo took seventh place in Russia, ahead of Vettel. Ricciardo returned to the podium in the United States, while Vettel finished in seventh after starting from pit lane following a complete change of his power unit. Vettel finished fifth in Brazil while Ricciardo retired when his front-left upright suspension was broken. Both drivers were thrown out of qualifying in Abu Dhabi after their cars failed scrutineering, and they started from the pit lane. Vettel came home 8th and Ricciardo got 4th place.

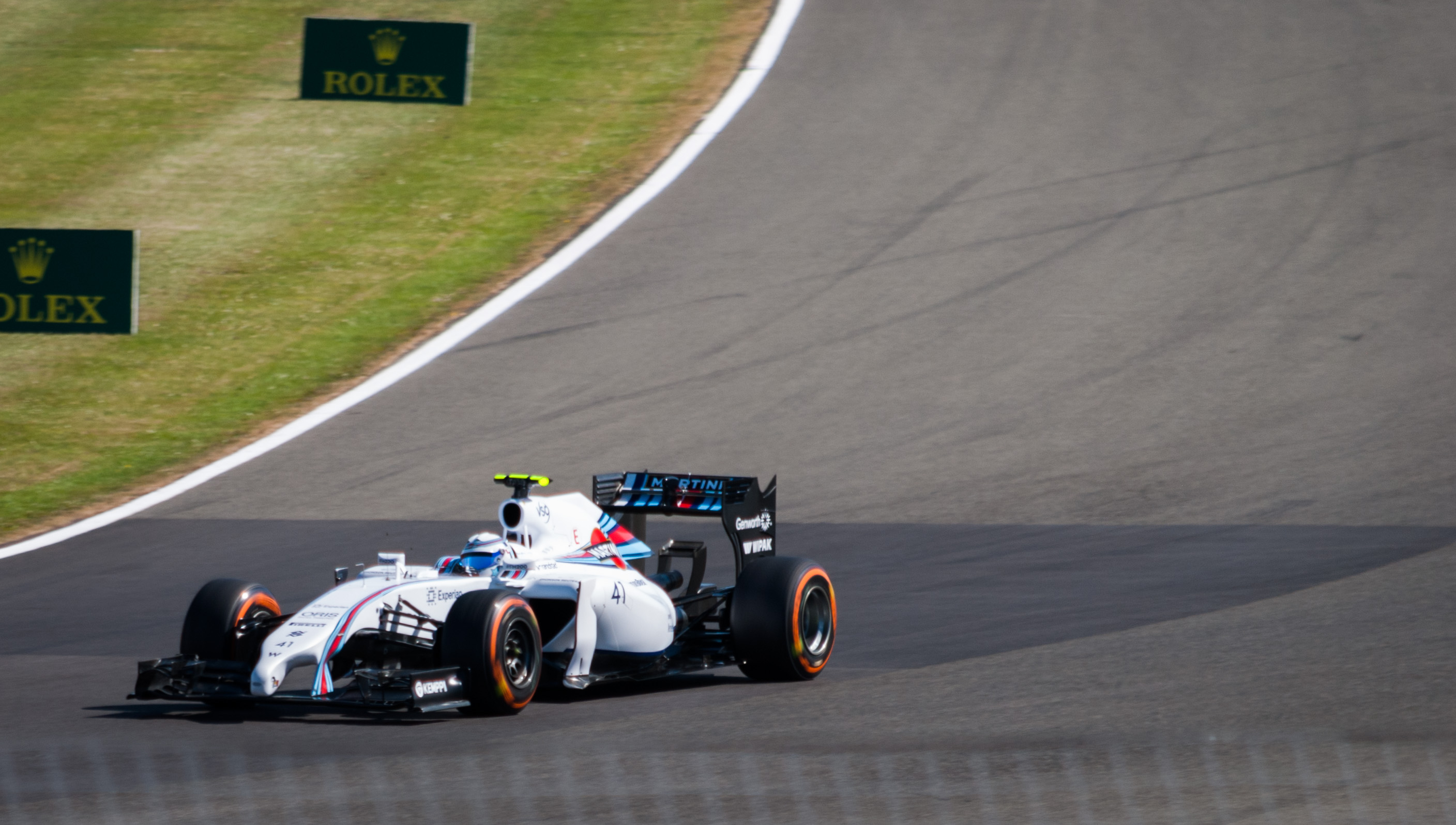
Susie Wolff became the first woman to take part in an F1 weekend since 1992 when she participated in free practice at the British Grand Prix.

Williams were third, having started the season strongly when Valtteri Bottas scored more points in the opening race than the Williams team did during the 2013 season. Bottas and teammate Felipe Massa went on to record points finishes in Malaysia and Bahrain. The team recorded another minor points finish in China, before Bottas showed enough pace to challenge Ricciardo for a podium position early in the Spanish Grand Prix, but eventually finished fifth after being overtaken by Vettel late in the race. Massa finished seventh in Monaco, while Bottas retired. In Canada, Massa showed good enough pace to challenge for the lead in the late stages of the race until he collided with Sergio Pérez on the final lap. Williams managed to lock out the front row when Mercedes struggled in qualifying, with Massa qualifying on pole, his first since the 2008 Brazilian Grand Prix, and he went on to finish in fourth while Bottas scored the first podium of his career, crossing the finish line in third place. Bottas secured back-to-back podium finishes by scoring second place in Britain and soon after claimed his third consecutive podium finish after finishing in second place in Germany, while Massa retired on the opening lap in both Britain and Germany. In Hungary, Massa and Bottas were fifth and eighth, respectively. Bottas returned to the podium in Belgium, while Massa was outside the points. Massa took his first podium since the 2013 Spanish Grand Prix in Italy, ahead of Bottas. Massa took fifth place in Singapore, while Bottas finished outside the points due to a loss of grip in the late stages. In Japan, Bottas and Massa were sixth and seventh, respectively. Bottas took the fifth podium of his career with a third place in Russia, while Massa finished outside the points. At the next round in the United States, Massa and Bottas finished fourth and fifth respectively. In Brazil, Massa took his second podium of the season and his fifth podium on his home soil in third place, while Bottas finished tenth. In the last race of the season in Abu Dhabi, both drivers stepped on the podium with Massa finishing second and Bottas third.

Ferrari finished fourth, with Fernando Alonso and Kimi Räikkönen scoring a mixed run of results throughout the season. Alonso took his first podium of the season with his third-place finish in China, while Räikkönen had a string of relatively low-placed results, the best of which was fourth place in Belgium. Both drivers recorded minor points in Canada and again in Austria. Alonso had to be content with sixth place in Britain after a rain-affected qualifying saw him start from sixteenth place, while Räikkönen crashed heavily on the opening lap, forcing the temporary stoppage of the race. Alonso finished in fifth place in Germany, while Räikkönen was outside the points. Alonso managed to get the team's best result with second place in Hungary, while Räikkönen returned to the points in sixth place. Räikkönen took fourth place in Belgium, while Alonso finished eighth but was promoted to seventh after Magnussen's penalty. In Italy, Alonso was retired with an ERS failure, while Räikkönen finished in tenth, but was promoted to ninth after Magnussen's penalty. Alonso took fourth place in Singapore, while Räikkönen took eighth. In Japan, neither Alonso nor Räikkönen scored points, as Alonso retired when his power unit failed due to an electrical problem, while Räikkönen ended up in twelfth, ending Ferrari's run of eighty-one consecutive points finishes—the longest run in Formula One history. Alonso took sixth place in Russia, while Räikkönen came home in ninth. Alonso repeated the result in the United States, while Räikkönen finished outside the points. In Brazil, Alonso finished sixth, ahead of Räikkönen. Both drivers recorded minor points in Abu Dhabi. It was the first time since 1993 that Ferrari failed to win a race in a season.

McLaren secured fifth place. Following their first season without a podium finish in 2013, the team saw Kevin Magnussen and Jenson Button finish second and third in Australia. Both drivers recorded points finishes in Malaysia, but were forced out of the Bahrain Grand Prix with clutch issues, and failed to score points in China and again in Spain. The team managed to recover in Monaco, with Button finishing sixth and Magnussen tenth after contact with Räikkönen. Button finished fourth in Canada after a string of late-race retirements helped him move up the order. Magnussen used his recent knowledge of the circuit to finish seventh in Austria, while Button's attempt at a different strategy failed, leaving him in eleventh. Button and Magnussen were fourth and seventh respectively in Britain. Button finished eighth in Germany, ahead of Magnussen, who was involved in a first-lap altercation with Massa. Button finished tenth in Hungary, while Magnussen was outside the points. In Belgium, Magnussen finished sixth ahead of Button, but was given a twenty-second time penalty after the race, demoting him to twelfth. In Italy, Magnussen and Button originally finished seventh and ninth respectively, but Magnussen received another time penalty—this time for five seconds—demoting him to tenth, while Button promoted to eighth. Magnussen took the final point in Singapore, while Button was forced out when his engine shut down. Button finished fifth in Japan, while Magnussen was outside the points. The team took fourth and fifth place in Russia, with Button finishing in front of Magnussen. Magnussen took eighth in the United States, while Button failed to score points. Button finished fourth in Brazil whilst Magnussen finished ninth. In Abu Dhabi, Button finished fifth, while Magnussen finished outside the points.

Force India were classified sixth overall. In Bahrain, the team scored their first podium finish since the 2009 Belgian Grand Prix; Sergio Pérez, who finished third for the team in Bahrain, was on target to score another podium in Canada, but was rear-ended by Felipe Massa late in the race and both retired. Pérez briefly held the lead in Austria, but gradually fell back to sixth, and recorded the fastest lap, whilst Nico Hülkenberg battled Räikkönen for ninth. Hülkenberg finished eighth in Britain, while Pérez was outside the points. Both drivers scored minor points in Germany. Force India suffered their first double retirement of the season in Hungary as both drivers crashed out of the race. Pérez finished ninth in Belgium, while Hülkenberg was outside the points. Both drivers however were later promoted to eighth and tenth respectively after Kevin Magnussen was issued a time penalty shortly after the race. Pérez originally finished eighth in Italy, but was promoted to seventh after Magnussen's penalty, while Hülkenberg was outside the points. Hülkenberg finished ninth in Singapore, while Pérez recovered to seventh place after being forced to make an unscheduled pit stop following contact with Adrian Sutil. Hülkenberg and Pérez were eighth and tenth respectively in Japan. Pérez took the final points-scoring position in Russia, while Hülkenberg was outside the points. The team had another double retirement in the United States, as Pérez collided with both Räikkönen and Sutil, forcing both himself and Sutil into retirement, while Hülkenberg ground to a halt later in the race with mechanical issues. Hülkenberg finished eighth in Brazil whilst Pérez finished outside the points. Hülkenberg and Pérez fared slightly better in Abu Dhabi, finishing sixth and seventh respectively.

Scuderia Toro Rosso were seventh overall, with Russian rookie Daniil Kvyat becoming the youngest driver to score points in Formula One, having finished ninth in Australia. Jean-Éric Vergne finished eighth in Canada, while Kvyat retired with a mechanical failure. Both drivers retired in Austria: Kvyat after suffering a rear suspension failure, and Vergne with brake issues. Both drivers recorded points in Britain. Vergne finished ninth in Hungary, while Kvyat missed the points. Kvyat finished ninth in Belgium, while Vergne was outside the points. Vergne recorded the team's best result of the season with sixth place in Singapore. Vergne took ninth in Japan, while Kvyat qualified a career-best fifth in Russia, but fell down the order with fuel consumption problems. Vergne originally took ninth in the United States, but was demoted to tenth after he incurred a five-second penalty following contact in an incident with Grosjean. Kvyat finished outside the points after taking a ten-place grid penalty for an engine change. Both Toro Rossos finished outside the points in Brazil and Abu Dhabi, bringing a disappointing end to both drivers' careers with the team.

After missing the first test of pre-season, Lotus finished the season in eighth position, with Romain Grosjean finishing eighth in both Spain and Monaco, while Pastor Maldonado remained scoreless until he picked up two points for ninth place in the United States.

Marussia were classified ninth, owing to Jules Bianchi scoring points in Monaco as he finished the race in ninth place, but both drivers collided on the opening lap of the Canadian Grand Prix, bringing about an end to Max Chilton's run of twenty-five consecutive classified race finishes. Bianchi managed to score the team's best ever qualifying result with twelfth in Britain. He was later critically injured in an accident in the closing stages of the Japanese Grand Prix and succumbed to his injuries on 17 July 2015. The team later elected to sit out the United States round altogether before the team closed down ahead of the Brazilian Grand Prix.

Sauber and Caterham finished tenth and eleventh overall, with both teams having failed to score a point in 2014. Sauber suffered a string of retirements for both drivers while struggling with a car that was too heavy. Sutil took the team's best result by qualifying in ninth in the United States, but his performance was short-lived, as he was hit from behind by Sergio Pérez, and the team ultimately endured their first pointless season in their twenty-two-year history. Caterham spent the early races trading places with Marussia, but fell behind once Bianchi scored points for Marussia in Monaco, despite an eleventh-place finish for Marcus Ericsson in the same race. In Belgium, Caterham opted to replace current driver Kobayashi with three time Le Mans winner and current FIA World Endurance Championship champion André Lotterer; however after out-qualifying Ericsson, he was forced to retire after a single lap when his power unit cut out. Team principal Tony Fernandes sold the team in July, but the transaction was never finalised and the team was put into administration following the Russian Grand Prix. As a result, Caterham was forced to miss the United States and Brazilian Grands Prix. They returned in time for the Abu Dhabi Grand Prix, entering Kamui Kobayashi alongside debutant Will Stevens. Kobayashi retired from the race, while Stevens was the final classified driver in 17th place.

== Results and standings ==
=== Grands Prix ===
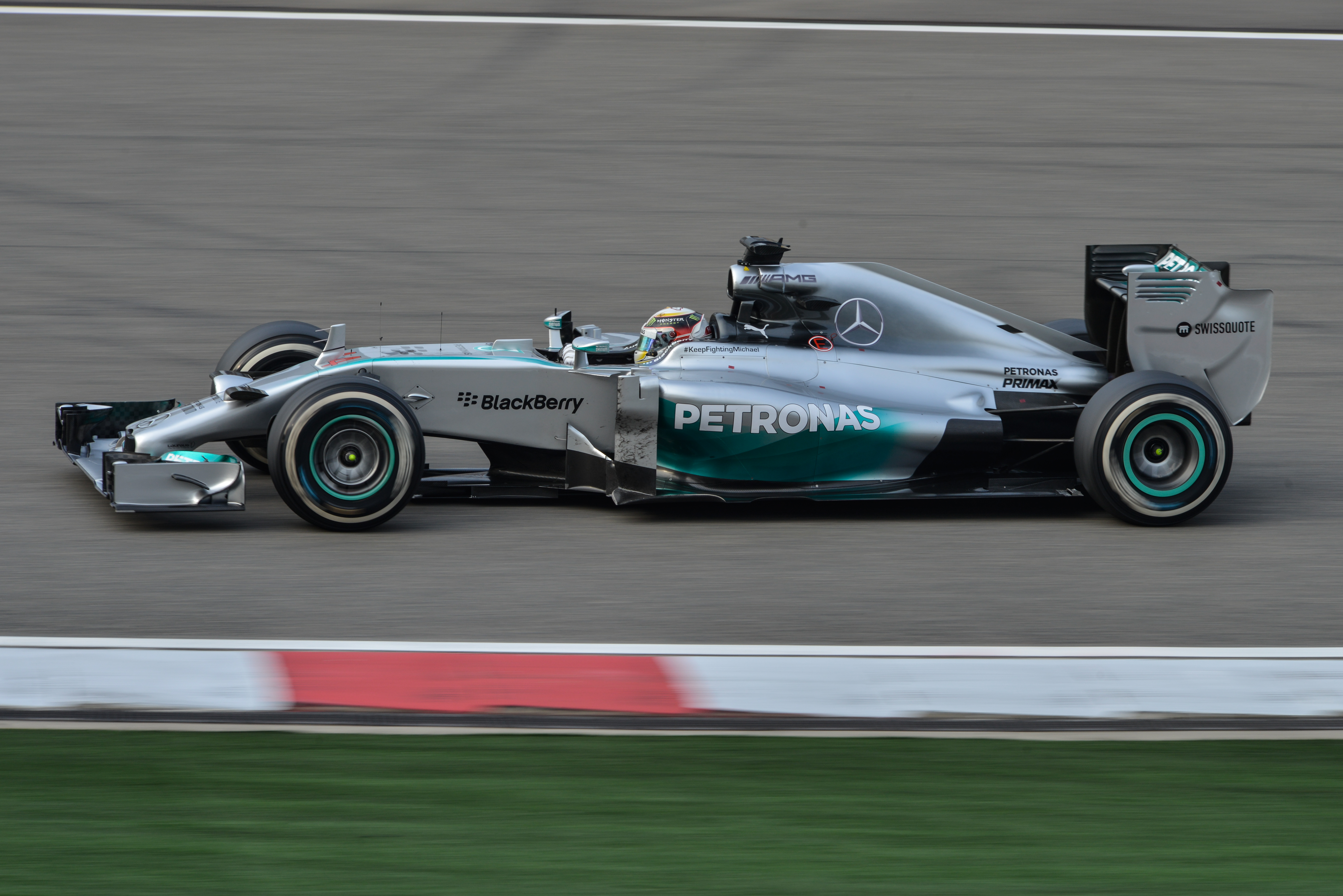
Mercedes F1 W05 Hybrid, the car entered by World Constructors' Champion Mercedes

| Round | Grand Prix | Pole position | Fastest lap | Winning driver | Winning constructor | Report |
|---|---|---|---|---|---|---|
| 1 | (Australia) Australian Grand Prix | (United Kingdom) Lewis Hamilton | (Germany) Nico Rosberg | (Germany) Nico Rosberg | (Germany) Mercedes | Report |
| 2 | (Malaysia) Malaysian Grand Prix | (United Kingdom) Lewis Hamilton | (United Kingdom) Lewis Hamilton | (United Kingdom) Lewis Hamilton | (Germany) Mercedes | Report |
| 3 | Bahrain Grand Prix | (Germany) Nico Rosberg | (Germany) Nico Rosberg | (United Kingdom) Lewis Hamilton | (Germany) Mercedes | Report |
| 4 | (China) Chinese Grand Prix | (United Kingdom) Lewis Hamilton | (Germany) Nico Rosberg | (United Kingdom) Lewis Hamilton | (Germany) Mercedes | Report |
| 5 | (Spain) Spanish Grand Prix | (United Kingdom) Lewis Hamilton | (Germany) Sebastian Vettel | (United Kingdom) Lewis Hamilton | (Germany) Mercedes | Report |
| 6 | Monaco Grand Prix | (Germany) Nico Rosberg | (Finland) Kimi Räikkönen | (Germany) Nico Rosberg | (Germany) Mercedes | Report |
| 7 | (Canada) Canadian Grand Prix | (Germany) Nico Rosberg | (Brazil) Felipe Massa | (Australia) Daniel Ricciardo | (Austria) Red Bull Racing-Renault | Report |
| 8 | (Austria) Austrian Grand Prix | (Brazil) Felipe Massa | (Mexico) Sergio Pérez | (Germany) Nico Rosberg | (Germany) Mercedes | Report |
| 9 | (United Kingdom) British Grand Prix | (Germany) Nico Rosberg | (United Kingdom) Lewis Hamilton | (United Kingdom) Lewis Hamilton | (Germany) Mercedes | Report |
| 10 | (Germany) German Grand Prix | (Germany) Nico Rosberg | (United Kingdom) Lewis Hamilton | (Germany) Nico Rosberg | (Germany) Mercedes | Report |
| 11 | (Hungary) Hungarian Grand Prix | (Germany) Nico Rosberg | (Germany) Nico Rosberg | (Australia) Daniel Ricciardo | (Austria) Red Bull Racing-Renault | Report |
| 12 | (Belgium) Belgian Grand Prix | (Germany) Nico Rosberg | (Germany) Nico Rosberg | (Australia) Daniel Ricciardo | (Austria) Red Bull Racing-Renault | Report |
| 13 | (Italy) Italian Grand Prix | (United Kingdom) Lewis Hamilton | (United Kingdom) Lewis Hamilton | (United Kingdom) Lewis Hamilton | (Germany) Mercedes | Report |
| 14 | Singapore Grand Prix | (United Kingdom) Lewis Hamilton | (United Kingdom) Lewis Hamilton | (United Kingdom) Lewis Hamilton | (Germany) Mercedes | Report |
| 15 | (Japan) Japanese Grand Prix | (Germany) Nico Rosberg | (United Kingdom) Lewis Hamilton | (United Kingdom) Lewis Hamilton | (Germany) Mercedes | Report |
| 16 | (Russia) Russian Grand Prix | (United Kingdom) Lewis Hamilton | (Finland) Valtteri Bottas | (United Kingdom) Lewis Hamilton | (Germany) Mercedes | Report |
| 17 | United States Grand Prix | (Germany) Nico Rosberg | (Germany) Sebastian Vettel | (United Kingdom) Lewis Hamilton | (Germany) Mercedes | Report |
| 18 | (Brazil) Brazilian Grand Prix | (Germany) Nico Rosberg | (United Kingdom) Lewis Hamilton | (Germany) Nico Rosberg | (Germany) Mercedes | Report |
| 19 | (United Arab Emirates) Abu Dhabi Grand Prix | (Germany) Nico Rosberg | (Australia) Daniel Ricciardo | (United Kingdom) Lewis Hamilton | (Germany) Mercedes | Report |

=== Scoring system ===
Points were awarded to the top ten classified finishers in each race using the following system, except for the final race in which the points allocations were doubled:

| Position | 1st | 2nd | 3rd | 4th | 5th | 6th | 7th | 8th | 9th | 10th |
| Points | 25 | 18 | 15 | 12 | 10 | 8 | 6 | 4 | 2 | 1 |

In the event of a tie, a count-back system was used as a tie-breaker, with a driver's best result used to decide the standings. (Note: In the event that two or more drivers achieved the same result an equal number of times, their next-best result was used.)

=== World Drivers' Championship standings ===
| Pos. | Driver | AUS (Australia) | MAL (Malaysia) | BHR (Bahrain) | CHN (China) | ESP (Spain) | MON (Monaco) | CAN (Canada) | AUT (Austria) | GBR (United Kingdom) | GER (Germany) | HUN (Hungary) | BEL (Belgium) | ITA (Italy) | SIN (Singapore) | JPN (Japan) | RUS (Russia) | USA (United States) | BRA (Brazil) | ABU‡ (United Arab Emirates) | Points |
|---|---|---|---|---|---|---|---|---|---|---|---|---|---|---|---|---|---|---|---|---|---|
| 1 | (United Kingdom) Lewis Hamilton | Ret^{P} | 1^{P}^{F} | 1 | 1^{P} | 1^{P} | 2 | Ret | 2 | 1^{F} | 3^{F} | 3 | Ret | 1^{P}^{F} | 1^{P}^{F} | 1^{F} | 1^{P} | 1 | 2^{F} | 1 | 384 |
| 2 | (Germany) Nico Rosberg | 1^{F} | 2 | 2^{P}^{F} | 2^{F} | 2 | 1^{P} | 2^{P} | 1 | Ret^{P} | 1^{P} | 4^{P}^{F} | 2^{P}^{F} | 2 | Ret | 2^{P} | 2 | 2^{P} | 1^{P} | 14^{P} | 317 |
| 3 | (Australia) Daniel Ricciardo | DSQ | Ret | 4 | 4 | 3 | 3 | 1 | 8 | 3 | 6 | 1 | 1 | 5 | 3 | 4 | 7 | 3 | Ret | 4^{F} | 238 |
| 4 | (Finland) Valtteri Bottas | 5 | 8 | 8 | 7 | 5 | Ret | 7 | 3 | 2 | 2 | 8 | 3 | 4 | 11 | 6 | 3^{F} | 5 | 10 | 3 | 186 |
| 5 | (Germany) Sebastian Vettel | Ret | 3 | 6 | 5 | 4^{F} | Ret | 3 | Ret | 5 | 4 | 7 | 5 | 6 | 2 | 3 | 8 | 7^{F} | 5 | 8 | 167 |
| 6 | (Spain) Fernando Alonso | 4 | 4 | 9 | 3 | 6 | 4 | 6 | 5 | 6 | 5 | 2 | 7 | Ret | 4 | Ret | 6 | 6 | 6 | 9 | 161 |
| 7 | (Brazil) Felipe Massa | Ret | 7 | 7 | 15 | 13 | 7 | 12^{F}^{†} | 4^{P} | Ret | Ret | 5 | 13 | 3 | 5 | 7 | 11 | 4 | 3 | 2 | 134 |
| 8 | (United Kingdom) Jenson Button | 3 | 6 | 17^{†} | 11 | 11 | 6 | 4 | 11 | 4 | 8 | 10 | 6 | 8 | Ret | 5 | 4 | 12 | 4 | 5 | 126 |
| 9 | (Germany) Nico Hülkenberg | 6 | 5 | 5 | 6 | 10 | 5 | 5 | 9 | 8 | 7 | Ret | 10 | 12 | 9 | 8 | 12 | Ret | 8 | 6 | 96 |
| 10 | (Mexico) Sergio Pérez | 10 | DNS | 3 | 9 | 9 | Ret | 11^{†} | 6^{F} | 11 | 10 | Ret | 8 | 7 | 7 | 10 | 10 | Ret | 15 | 7 | 59 |
| 11 | (Denmark) Kevin Magnussen | 2 | 9 | Ret | 13 | 12 | 10 | 9 | 7 | 7 | 9 | 12 | 12 | 10 | 10 | 14 | 5 | 8 | 9 | 11 | 55 |
| 12 | (Finland) Kimi Räikkönen | 7 | 12 | 10 | 8 | 7 | 12^{F} | 10 | 10 | Ret | 11 | 6 | 4 | 9 | 8 | 12 | 9 | 13 | 7 | 10 | 55 |
| 13 | (France) Jean-Éric Vergne | 8 | Ret | Ret | 12 | Ret | Ret | 8 | Ret | 10 | 13 | 9 | 11 | 13 | 6 | 9 | 13 | 10 | 13 | 12 | 22 |
| 14 | (France) Romain Grosjean | Ret | 11 | 12 | Ret | 8 | 8 | Ret | 14 | 12 | Ret | Ret | Ret | 16 | 13 | 15 | 17 | 11 | 17^{†} | 13 | 8 |
| 15 | (Russia) Daniil Kvyat | 9 | 10 | 11 | 10 | 14 | Ret | Ret | Ret | 9 | Ret | 14 | 9 | 11 | 14 | 11 | 14 | 15 | 11 | Ret | 8 |
| 16 | (Venezuela) Pastor Maldonado | Ret | Ret | 14 | 14 | 15 | DNS | Ret | 12 | 17^{†} | 12 | 13 | Ret | 14 | 12 | 16 | 18 | 9 | 12 | Ret | 2 |
| 17 | (France) Jules Bianchi | NC | Ret | 16 | 17 | 18 | 9 | Ret | 15 | 14 | 15 | 15 | 18^{†} | 18 | 16 | 20^{†} | | | | | 2 |
| 18 | (Germany) Adrian Sutil | 11 | Ret | Ret | Ret | 17 | Ret | 13 | 13 | 13 | Ret | 11 | 14 | 15 | Ret | 21^{†} | 16 | Ret | 16 | 16 | 0 |
| 19 | (Sweden) Marcus Ericsson | Ret | 14 | Ret | 20 | 20 | 11 | Ret | 18 | Ret | 18 | Ret | 17 | 19 | 15 | 17 | 19 | | | | 0 |
| 20 | (Mexico) Esteban Gutiérrez | 12 | Ret | Ret | 16 | 16 | Ret | 14^{†} | 19 | Ret | 14 | Ret | 15 | 20 | Ret | 13 | 15 | 14 | 14 | 15 | 0 |
| 21 | (United Kingdom) Max Chilton | 13 | 15 | 13 | 19 | 19 | 14 | Ret | 17 | 16 | 17 | 16 | 16 | Ret | 17 | 18 | Ret | | | | 0 |
| 22 | (Japan) Kamui Kobayashi | Ret | 13 | 15 | 18 | Ret | 13 | Ret | 16 | 15 | 16 | Ret | | 17 | DNS | 19 | Ret | | | Ret | 0 |
| 23 | (United Kingdom) Will Stevens | | | | | | | | | | | | | | | | | | | 17 | 0 |
| – | (Germany) André Lotterer | | | | | | | | | | | | Ret | | | | | | | | 0 |
| – | (United States) Alexander Rossi | | | | | | | | | | | | WD | | | | WD | | | | 0 |
| Pos. | Driver | AUS (Australia) | MAL (Malaysia) | BHR (Bahrain) | CHN (China) | ESP (Spain) | MON (Monaco) | CAN (Canada) | AUT (Austria) | GBR (United Kingdom) | GER (Germany) | HUN (Hungary) | BEL (Belgium) | ITA (Italy) | SIN (Singapore) | JPN (Japan) | RUS (Russia) | USA (United States) | BRA (Brazil) | ABU‡ (United Arab Emirates) | Points |

Key
| Colour | Result |
|---|---|
| Gold | Winner |
| Silver | Second place |
| Bronze | Third place |
| Green | Other points position |
| Blue | Other classified position |
| Blue | Not classified, finished (NC) |
| Purple | Not classified, retired (Ret) |
| Red | Did not qualify (DNQ) |
| Black | Disqualified (DSQ) |
| White | Did not start (DNS) |
| White | Race cancelled (C) |
| Blank | Did not practice (DNP) |
| Blank | Excluded (EX) |
| Blank | Did not arrive (DNA) |
| Blank | Withdrawn (WD) |
| Blank | Did not enter (empty cell) |
| Annotation | Meaning |
| P | Pole position |
| F | Fastest lap |

Notes:

- † – Drivers did not finish the Grand Prix, but were classified as they completed more than 90% of the race distance.
- ‡ – Double points were awarded at the Abu Dhabi Grand Prix.

=== World Constructors' Championship standings ===
| Pos. | Constructor | AUS (Australia) | MAL (Malaysia) | BHR (Bahrain) | CHN (China) | ESP (Spain) | MON (Monaco) | CAN (Canada) | AUT (Austria) | GBR (United Kingdom) | GER (Germany) | HUN (Hungary) | BEL (Belgium) | ITA (Italy) | SIN (Singapore) | JPN (Japan) | RUS (Russia) | USA (United States) | BRA (Brazil) | ABU‡ (United Arab Emirates) | Points |
|---|---|---|---|---|---|---|---|---|---|---|---|---|---|---|---|---|---|---|---|---|---|
| 1 | (Germany) Mercedes | 1^{F} | 1^{P}^{F} | 1 | 1^{P} | 1^{P} | 1^{P} | 2^{P} | 1 | 1^{F} | 1^{P} | 3 | 2^{P}^{F} | 1^{P}^{F} | 1^{P}^{F} | 1^{F} | 1^{P} | 1 | 1^{P} | 1 | 701 |
| 1 | (Germany) Mercedes | Ret^{P} | 2 | 2^{P}^{F} | 2^{F} | 2 | 2 | Ret | 2 | Ret^{P} | 3^{F} | 4^{P}^{F} | Ret | 2 | Ret | 2^{P} | 2 | 2^{P} | 2^{F} | 14^{P} | 701 |
| 2 | (Austria) Red Bull Racing-Renault | Ret | 3 | 4 | 4 | 3 | 3 | 1 | 8 | 3 | 4 | 1 | 1 | 5 | 2 | 3 | 7 | 3 | 5 | 4^{F} | 405 |
| 2 | (Austria) Red Bull Racing-Renault | DSQ | Ret | 6 | 5 | 4^{F} | Ret | 3 | Ret | 5 | 6 | 7 | 5 | 6 | 3 | 4 | 8 | 7^{F} | Ret | 8 | 405 |
| 3 | (United Kingdom) Williams-Mercedes | 5 | 7 | 7 | 7 | 5 | 7 | 7 | 3 | 2 | 2 | 5 | 3 | 3 | 5 | 6 | 3^{F} | 4 | 3 | 2 | 320 |
| 3 | (United Kingdom) Williams-Mercedes | Ret | 8 | 8 | 15 | 13 | Ret | 12^{F}^{†} | 4^{P} | Ret | Ret | 8 | 13 | 4 | 11 | 7 | 11 | 5 | 10 | 3 | 320 |
| 4 | (Italy) Ferrari | 4 | 4 | 9 | 3 | 6 | 4 | 6 | 5 | 6 | 5 | 2 | 4 | 9 | 4 | 12 | 6 | 6 | 6 | 9 | 216 |
| 4 | (Italy) Ferrari | 7 | 12 | 10 | 8 | 7 | 12^{F} | 10 | 10 | Ret | 11 | 6 | 7 | Ret | 8 | Ret | 9 | 13 | 7 | 10 | 216 |
| 5 | (United Kingdom) McLaren-Mercedes | 2 | 6 | 17^{†} | 11 | 11 | 6 | 4 | 7 | 4 | 8 | 10 | 6 | 8 | 10 | 5 | 4 | 8 | 4 | 5 | 181 |
| 5 | (United Kingdom) McLaren-Mercedes | 3 | 9 | Ret | 13 | 12 | 10 | 9 | 11 | 7 | 9 | 12 | 12 | 10 | Ret | 14 | 5 | 12 | 9 | 11 | 181 |
| 6 | Force India-Mercedes | 6 | 5 | 3 | 6 | 9 | 5 | 5 | 6^{F} | 8 | 7 | Ret | 8 | 7 | 7 | 8 | 10 | Ret | 8 | 6 | 155 |
| 6 | Force India-Mercedes | 10 | DNS | 5 | 9 | 10 | Ret | 11^{†} | 9 | 11 | 10 | Ret | 10 | 12 | 9 | 10 | 12 | Ret | 15 | 7 | 155 |
| 7 | (Italy) Toro Rosso-Renault | 8 | 10 | 11 | 10 | 14 | Ret | 8 | Ret | 9 | Ret | 9 | 9 | 11 | 6 | 9 | 13 | 10 | 11 | 12 | 30 |
| 7 | (Italy) Toro Rosso-Renault | 9 | Ret | Ret | 12 | Ret | Ret | Ret | Ret | 10 | 13 | 14 | 11 | 13 | 14 | 11 | 14 | 15 | 13 | Ret | 30 |
| 8 | (United Kingdom) Lotus-Renault | Ret | 11 | 12 | 14 | 8 | 8 | Ret | 12 | 12 | 12 | 13 | Ret | 14 | 12 | 15 | 17 | 9 | 12 | 13 | 10 |
| 8 | (United Kingdom) Lotus-Renault | Ret | Ret | 14 | Ret | 15 | DNS | Ret | 14 | 17^{†} | Ret | Ret | Ret | 16 | 13 | 16 | 18 | 11 | 17^{†} | Ret | 10 |
| 9 | (Russia) Marussia-Ferrari | 13 | 15 | 13 | 17 | 18 | 9 | Ret | 15 | 14 | 15 | 15 | 16 | 18 | 16 | 18 | WD | | | | 2 |
| 9 | (Russia) Marussia-Ferrari | NC | Ret | 16 | 19 | 19 | 14 | Ret | 17 | 16 | 17 | 16 | 18^{†} | Ret | 17 | 20^{†} | Ret | | | | 2 |
| 10 | (Switzerland) Sauber-Ferrari | 11 | Ret | Ret | 16 | 16 | Ret | 13 | 13 | 13 | 14 | 11 | 14 | 15 | Ret | 13 | 15 | 14 | 14 | 15 | 0 |
| 10 | (Switzerland) Sauber-Ferrari | 12 | Ret | Ret | Ret | 17 | Ret | 14^{†} | 19 | Ret | Ret | Ret | 15 | 20 | Ret | 21^{†} | 16 | Ret | 16 | 16 | 0 |
| 11 | (Malaysia) Caterham-Renault | Ret | 13 | 15 | 18 | 20 | 11 | Ret | 16 | 15 | 16 | Ret | 17 | 17 | 15 | 17 | 19 | | | 17 | 0 |
| 11 | (Malaysia) Caterham-Renault | Ret | 14 | Ret | 20 | Ret | 13 | Ret | 18 | Ret | 18 | Ret | Ret | 19 | DNS | 19 | Ret | | | Ret | 0 |
| Pos. | Constructor | AUS (Australia) | MAL (Malaysia) | BHR (Bahrain) | CHN (China) | ESP (Spain) | MON (Monaco) | CAN (Canada) | AUT (Austria) | GBR (United Kingdom) | GER (Germany) | HUN (Hungary) | BEL (Belgium) | ITA (Italy) | SIN (Singapore) | JPN (Japan) | RUS (Russia) | USA (United States) | BRA (Brazil) | ABU‡ (United Arab Emirates) | Points |

Key
| Colour | Result |
|---|---|
| Gold | Winner |
| Silver | Second place |
| Bronze | Third place |
| Green | Other points position |
| Blue | Other classified position |
| Blue | Not classified, finished (NC) |
| Purple | Not classified, retired (Ret) |
| Red | Did not qualify (DNQ) |
| Black | Disqualified (DSQ) |
| White | Did not start (DNS) |
| White | Race cancelled (C) |
| Blank | Did not practice (DNP) |
| Blank | Excluded (EX) |
| Blank | Did not arrive (DNA) |
| Blank | Withdrawn (WD) |
| Blank | Did not enter (empty cell) |
| Annotation | Meaning |
| P | Pole position |
| F | Fastest lap |

Notes:

- † – Drivers did not finish the Grand Prix, but were classified as they completed more than 90% of the race distance.
- ‡ – Double points were awarded at the Abu Dhabi Grand Prix.
- The standings are sorted by best result, rows are not related to the drivers. In case of tie on points, the best positions achieved determined the outcome.

== See also ==
- 2014 Formula One pre-season testing
