= 2014 Hungarian Grand Prix =

Race 11 of 19 in the 2014 Formula One World Championship
← Previous race	Next race →
- Layout of the Hungaroring circuit

Race details
- Date: 27 July 2014
- Official name: Formula 1 Pirelli Magyar Nagydíj 2014
- Location: Hungaroring; Mogyoród, Hungary
- Course: Permanent racing facility
- Course length: 4.381 km (2.722 miles)
- Distance: 70 laps, 306.630 km (190.531 miles)
- Weather: Overcast. Wet track at start, then drying. Scattered thunderstorms during the day, temperatures reaching a maximum of 26 degrees.
- Attendance: 169,000 (Weekend) 67,000 (Race Day)

Pole position
Driver	(Germany) Nico Rosberg	Mercedes
- Time: 1:22.715

Fastest lap
Driver	(Germany) Nico Rosberg	Mercedes
- Time: 1:25.724 on lap 64

Podium
First	(Australia) Daniel Ricciardo	Red Bull Racing-Renault
Second	(Spain) Fernando Alonso	Ferrari
Third	(United Kingdom) Lewis Hamilton	Mercedes

The 2014 Hungarian Grand Prix (formally the Formula 1 Pirelli Magyar Nagydíj 2014) was a Formula One motor race held on 27 July 2014 at the Hungaroring in Mogyoród, Hungary. It was the eleventh round of the 2014 Formula One season and the 30th Hungarian Grand Prix, and the 29th time it had been held as a round of the World Championship. The 70-lap race was won by Daniel Ricciardo for the Red Bull Racing team after starting from fourth position. Fernando Alonso finished in second place for Ferrari, with Lewis Hamilton third for Mercedes. This race would be Alonso's last podium finish until the 2021 Qatar Grand Prix.

The race was only the third Hungarian Grand Prix to be rain-affected, after the 2006 and 2011 races. Thunderstorms and heavy rain soaked the track at around lunchtime, forcing the drivers to start on intermediates before the track dried out later on in the race.

== Report ==
=== Background ===
The Grand Prix was contested by eleven teams, each of two drivers. The teams, also known as constructors, were Red Bull Racing, Mercedes-Benz, Ferrari, Lotus, McLaren, Force India, Sauber, Toro Rosso, Williams, Marussia and Caterham. Tyre supplier Pirelli brought four different tyre types to the race: two dry compounds, the medium "primes" and the soft "options" and two wet-weather compounds, the intermediate and full wet. The drag reduction system (DRS) had two activation zones for the race; one was on the start/finish straight from the final to first corners, and the second from turns 1 and 2.

Going into the race, Mercedes driver Nico Rosberg led the Drivers' Championship with 190 points, ahead of teammate Lewis Hamilton on 176 points and Daniel Ricciardo on 106. Fernando Alonso was fourth with 97 points while Valtteri Bottas was fifth on 91 points. In the Constructors' Championship Mercedes were leading with 366 points, Red Bull and Williams were second and third with 188 and 121 points respectively, while Ferrari with 116 and Force India on 98 points rounded out the top five positions. Mercedes had so far dominated the championship, winning nine out of the ten previous races, with Ricciardo winning the Canadian Grand Prix. Kevin Magnussen and Bottas had each gained second-place finishes, and Vettel, Alonso, Jenson Button and Sergio Pérez had achieved third place podium finishes.

Several teams made technical changes to their cars for the Grand Prix. Marussia changed one of their MR03 chassis for Max Chilton following balance and electrical issues that arose during the Austrian Grand Prix. Williams introduced a small wing section, aimed at increasing the amount of downforce, and therefore grip, produced by the bodywork. Lotus brought new front wing endplates, which were designed to scavenge airflow more efficiently.

=== Practice and qualifying ===
Three practice sessions were held before the race; two 90 minute sessions on Friday and one lasting an hour on Saturday. Hamilton was the fastest driver in the first practice session, ahead of Rosberg and Ferrari driver Kimi Räikkönen. Chilton's Marussia car was afflicted by an oil leak, resulting in a fire; this restricted him to completing only five timed laps, and he was 21st overall. Hamilton was fastest in the second session, ahead of Rosberg, Vettel and Alonso — although Hamilton had struggled with tyre grip throughout the session. The third session on Saturday morning saw Hamilton again fastest, ahead of Rosberg, Ricciardo and Vettel.

The qualifying session on Saturday afternoon was split into three parts. The first part ran for 18 minutes and eliminated the cars from qualifying that finished the session 17th or lower. During this session, the 107% rule was in effect, which necessitated each driver set a time within 107% of the quickest lap to qualify for the race. The second part of qualifying lasted 15 minutes and eliminated cars that finished in positions 11 to 16. The final part of qualifying determined the positions from first to tenth, and decided pole position.

Rosberg achieved his sixth pole position of the season, and his first at the Hungaroring, with a time of 1:22.715. He was joined on the front row by Vettel. Hamilton's car caught fire during qualifying before he could post a time, and so he started the race from the back row.

=== Race ===
The race started at 14:00 local time. The track was wet before the race, as thunderstorms had hit the area throughout the day. The air temperature ranged between 20 and 21 °C (68 and 70 °F), with the track temperature between 27 and 28 °C (81 and 82 °F).

All the runners began the race on intermediate tyres. At the start of the race, Nico Rosberg led into the first corner, while Valtteri Bottas overtook Sebastian Vettel on the outside of turn one to take second position. Fernando Alonso also overtook Vettel shortly after turn one to take third, but Vettel repassed him later on in the lap. Having started from the pit lane, Lewis Hamilton had not been permitted to participate in the formation lap. As a result, his brakes were cold, and on the first lap he spun off at turn two. The front left of his car lightly scraped against the barriers, mildly damaging the front wing, but otherwise his car sustained no serious damage and Hamilton rejoined the track, albeit last in 22nd position.

By lap 9, Rosberg had pulled out an advantage over the field and Hamilton had made his way up to 13th, but a crash by Marcus Ericsson meant that the safety car was deployed. All the drivers pitted under the safety car – all switching to dry tyres except the two McLarens who put on more intermediates – but the timing of the safety car's deployment meant that the top four runners (Rosberg, Bottas, Vettel and Alonso) missed the pit entry and had to do the entire lap behind the safety car before they could pit, costing them a considerable amount of time to the cars behind. Following the pit stops, Rosberg had moved down from 1st to 4th, and Bottas lost out massively to move down from 2nd to 11th, while Hamilton maintained 13th. Daniel Ricciardo benefited greatly from the safety car timing and was now leading the race. The safety car stayed out for longer than usual as Romain Grosjean lost control of his car and crashed under safety car conditions, but racing resumed on lap 14 and Jenson Button quickly passed Ricciardo for the lead. The following lap Rosberg was overtaken by Jean-Éric Vergne, demoting him to fifth, while Hamilton overtook four cars in one lap to move up to ninth. Having done only two laps on the intermediates, Button pitted from the lead for dry tyres on lap 16 as it became clear that the track was drying. McLaren's decision to put him on a second set of intermediates at his first stop had cost him greatly and he rejoined down the order in 16th.

On lap 17 Nico Hülkenberg retired after colliding with his teammate Sergio Pérez, though Pérez avoided any major damage. At this point Hamilton was up to seventh behind Vettel and only a second back from Rosberg, who was still fifth and stuck behind Vergne. Alonso was excelling in the conditions and had moved up to third by lap 18. On lap 23 Pérez spun at the final corner and crashed into the pit wall, meaning that Force India had suffered their first double retirement of the season. This brought out another safety car, prompting Ricciardo and Massa to pit from first and second, rejoining in sixth and seventh behind Alonso, Vergne, Rosberg, Vettel and Hamilton, all of whom stayed out under the safety car. The safety car came in on lap 27, and Alonso proceeded to pull out a lead over a train of cars reaching from second to fifth. The train of cars was led by Vergne, who was still holding up Rosberg, closely followed by Vettel and Hamilton. On lap 33 Rosberg pitted for softs from third and rejoined in 13th, while Vettel spun at the final corner – in the same place as Perez did – but miraculously managed to avoid contact with the wall. This allowed Hamilton to catch up to Vergne, and the following lap he overtook Vergne on the outside at turn four. On lap 39 Alonso pitted for soft tyres, and a lap later Hamilton pitted for medium tyres, rejoining in fourth and fifth respectively. This promoted Ricciardo back into the lead of the race. Rosberg had been making up positions but had been jumped by Hamilton in the pit stops and was down in ninth.

By lap 47, Rosberg had made further progress and was now almost a second behind Hamilton, with no cars separating them. Hamilton was given team orders to let Rosberg past, as Rosberg was on the softer tyre and had one more stop to make, while Hamilton was on a two stop strategy and did not have to pit again. However, Hamilton did not concede the place, replying on the radio: "I'm not slowing down for Nico. If he gets close enough to overtake, he can overtake me." Hamilton was aware that he was effectively racing Rosberg at this point, and he did not want to lose a considerable amount of time by lifting to let his title rival through, as Rosberg was still over a second behind him. Race-leader Ricciardo and Rosberg pitted for soft tyres on laps 54 and 56 respectively, rejoining in fourth and seventh. By lap 62, Alonso, Hamilton and Ricciardo were running very closely in first, second and third, with Hamilton 0.4 seconds behind Alonso and Ricciardo 0.4 seconds behind Hamilton. Meanwhile, Nico Rosberg was running fourth, over twenty seconds behind Ricciardo, but was rapidly closing the gap by up to three seconds a lap on his newer soft tyres, setting the fastest lap of the race while doing so. On lap 63, Alonso cut the chicane, but avoided any penalty and maintained the race lead. Ricciardo passed Hamilton around the outside of turn two on lap 67, and then the following lap passed Alonso at turn one for the race lead with two laps to go. Alonso continued to defend his position from Hamilton, but both of their tyres had fallen off of their respective operating cliffs – having both done close to 30 laps on their tyres – and by the final lap Rosberg had caught up to the back of them. Rosberg attempted to overtake Hamilton on the outside into turn two, but Hamilton defended and held position. Ricciardo crossed the line to win his second race of the season by 5.2 seconds, with Alonso coming second and Hamilton and Rosberg close behind in third and fourth. Massa and Räikkönen were fifth and sixth while Vettel and Bottas were only seventh and eighth after starting second and third (resulting in Ferrari overtaking Williams for third).

=== Post-race ===
The top three drivers appeared on the podium to collect their trophies, and were interviewed by a selected media delegate before the subsequent press conference. The standings barely changed in both the drivers and constructors championships with only one change in both. With a 3rd place, Lewis Hamilton closed the gap on Nico Rosberg to eleven points. After the race, Mercedes' non-executive chairman Niki Lauda said that he agreed with Hamilton's decision to ignore team orders, and stated that Mercedes had panicked in issuing the orders.

Both Mercedes cars suffered from rear brake problems at certain points during the race, with Rosberg's brakes overheating behind the first safety car and Hamilton encountering a similar problem in the middle stages of the race. Hamilton's car also suffered from a fuel pressure problem shortly after the rear brake problem. Upon analysing Hamilton's car after the race, Mercedes discovered that the fuel pressure issue had led to a considerable loss in engine power shortly after his second pitstop on lap 40. This cost Hamilton around 0.5 seconds per lap for the rest of the race - potentially costing him victory.

=== Qualifying ===
Pos.	No.	Driver	Constructor	Q1	Q2	Q3	Grid
1	6	(Germany) Nico Rosberg	Mercedes	1:25.227	1:23.310	1:22.715	1
2	1	(Germany) Sebastian Vettel	Red Bull Racing-Renault	1:25.662	1:23.606	1:23.201	2
3	77	(Finland) Valtteri Bottas	Williams-Mercedes	1:25.690	1:23.776	1:23.354	3
4	3	(Australia) Daniel Ricciardo	Red Bull Racing-Renault	1:25.495	1:23.676	1:23.391	4
5	14	(Spain) Fernando Alonso	Ferrari	1:26.087	1:24.249	1:23.909	5
6	19	(Brazil) Felipe Massa	Williams-Mercedes	1:26.592	1:24.030	1:24.223	6
7	22	(United Kingdom) Jenson Button	McLaren-Mercedes	1:26.612	1:24.502	1:24.294	7
8	25	(France) Jean-Éric Vergne	Toro Rosso-Renault	1:24.941	1:24.637	1:24.720	8
9	27	(Germany) Nico Hülkenberg	Force India-Mercedes	1:26.149	1:24.647	1:24.775	9
10	20	(Denmark) Kevin Magnussen	McLaren-Mercedes	1:26.578	1:24.585	No time^{3}	PL
11	26	(Russia) Daniil Kvyat	Toro Rosso-Renault	1:25.361	1:24.706		10
12	99	(Germany) Adrian Sutil	Sauber-Ferrari	1:26.027	1:25.136		11
13	11	(Mexico) Sergio Pérez	Force India-Mercedes	1:25.910	1:25.211		12
14	21	(Mexico) Esteban Gutiérrez	Sauber-Ferrari	1:25.709	1:25.260		13
15	8	(France) Romain Grosjean	Lotus-Renault	1:26.136	1:25.337		14
16	17	(France) Jules Bianchi	Marussia-Ferrari	1:26.728	1:27.419		15
17	7	(Finland) Kimi Räikkönen	Ferrari	1:26.792			16
18	10	(Japan) Kamui Kobayashi	Caterham-Renault	1:27.139			17
19	4	(United Kingdom) Max Chilton	Marussia-Ferrari	1:27.819			18
20	9	(Sweden) Marcus Ericsson	Caterham-Renault	1:28.643			19
107% time: 1:30:886
NC	44	(United Kingdom) Lewis Hamilton	Mercedes	No time^{1}			PL^{5}
NC	13	(Venezuela) Pastor Maldonado	Lotus-Renault	No time^{2}			20^{4},^{5}

- ^1 — Lewis Hamilton failed to set a time in Q1 after his car caught fire due to a fuel leak.
- ^2 — Pastor Maldonado failed to set a time in Q1 after his car stopped due to a problem with the power unit's energy store.
- ^3 — Kevin Magnussen failed to set a time in Q3 after going off track at the first corner.
- ^4 — Pastor Maldonado was imposed a five-place grid penalty for a gearbox change.
- ^5 — Pastor Maldonado and Lewis Hamilton failed to set a lap time in Q1. They were later given permission to start by race stewards.

=== Race ===
Pos.	No.	Driver	Constructor	Laps	Time/Retired	Grid	Points
1	3	(Australia) Daniel Ricciardo	Red Bull Racing-Renault	70	1:53:05.058	4	25
2	14	(Spain) Fernando Alonso	Ferrari	70	+5.225	5	18
3	44	(United Kingdom) Lewis Hamilton	Mercedes	70	+5.857	PL^{6}	15
4	6	(Germany) Nico Rosberg	Mercedes	70	+6.361	1	12
5	19	(Brazil) Felipe Massa	Williams-Mercedes	70	+29.841	6	10
6	7	(Finland) Kimi Räikkönen	Ferrari	70	+31.491	16	8
7	1	(Germany) Sebastian Vettel	Red Bull Racing-Renault	70	+40.964	2	6
8	77	(Finland) Valtteri Bottas	Williams-Mercedes	70	+41.344	3	4
9	25	(France) Jean-Éric Vergne	Toro Rosso-Renault	70	+58.527	8	2
10	22	(United Kingdom) Jenson Button	McLaren-Mercedes	70	+1:07.280	7	1
11	99	(Germany) Adrian Sutil	Sauber-Ferrari	70	+1:08.169	11	
12	20	(Denmark) Kevin Magnussen	McLaren-Mercedes	70	+1:18.465	PL^{6}	
13	13	(Venezuela) Pastor Maldonado	Lotus-Renault	70	+1:24.024	20	
14	26	(Russia) Daniil Kvyat	Toro Rosso-Renault	69	+1 Lap	PL^{7}	
15	17	(France) Jules Bianchi	Marussia-Ferrari	69	+1 Lap	15	
16	4	(United Kingdom) Max Chilton	Marussia-Ferrari	69	+1 Lap	18	
Ret	21	(Mexico) Esteban Gutiérrez	Sauber-Ferrari	32	Electrical	13	
Ret	10	(Japan) Kamui Kobayashi	Caterham-Renault	24	Fuel system	17	
Ret	11	(Mexico) Sergio Pérez	Force India-Mercedes	22	Accident	12	
Ret	27	(Germany) Nico Hülkenberg	Force India-Mercedes	14	Collision	9	
Ret	8	(France) Romain Grosjean	Lotus-Renault	10	Accident	14	
Ret	9	(Sweden) Marcus Ericsson	Caterham-Renault	7	Accident	19	

- ^6 — Lewis Hamilton and Kevin Magnussen started from pit lane after chassis changes.
- ^7 — Daniil Kvyat starts from the pits following a problem on the pre-grid.

== Championship standings after the race ==
Drivers' Championship standings

Pos.	Driver	Points
1	(Germany) Nico Rosberg	202
2	(United Kingdom) Lewis Hamilton	191
3	(Australia) Daniel Ricciardo	131
4	(Spain) Fernando Alonso	115
5	(Finland) Valtteri Bottas	95

Constructors' Championship standings

	Pos.	Constructor	Points
	1	(Germany) Mercedes	393
	2	(Austria) Red Bull Racing-Renault	219
1	3	(Italy) Ferrari	142
1	4	(United Kingdom) Williams-Mercedes	135
	5	Force India-Mercedes	98

- Note: Only the top five positions are included for both sets of standings.

== See also ==
- 2014 Hungaroring GP2 Series round
- 2014 Hungaroring GP3 Series round

Previous race: 2014 German Grand Prix	FIA Formula One World Championship; 2014 season	Next race: 2014 Belgian Grand Prix
Previous race: 2013 Hungarian Grand Prix	Hungarian Grand Prix	Next race: 2015 Hungarian Grand Prix
