= 2014 German Grand Prix =

Race 10 of 19 in the 2014 Formula One World Championship
| ← Previous race | Next race → |
- Layout of the Hockenheimring

Race details
- Date: 20 July 2014
- Official name: 2014 Formula 1 Grosser Preis Santander von Deutschland
- Location: Hockenheimring, Hockenheim, Germany
- Course: Permanent racing facility
- Course length: 4.574 km (2.842 miles)
- Distance: 67 laps, 306.458 km (190.424 miles)
- Weather: Cloudy with maximum temperatures reaching 26 degrees during the day.
- Attendance: 52,000 (Race Day)

Pole position
| Driver | (Germany) Nico Rosberg | Mercedes |
- Time: 1:16.540

Fastest lap
| Driver | (United Kingdom) Lewis Hamilton | Mercedes |
- Time: 1:19.908 on lap 53

Podium
| First | (Germany) Nico Rosberg | Mercedes |
| Second | (Finland) Valtteri Bottas | Williams-Mercedes |
| Third | (United Kingdom) Lewis Hamilton | Mercedes |

The 2014 German Grand Prix (formally known as the 2014 Formula 1 Grosser Preis Santander von Deutschland) was a Formula One motor race that took place on 20 July 2014. After being held at the Nürburgring GP-Strecke in 2013, the race returned to the Hockenheimring near Hockenheim in the German state of Baden-Württemberg, which last held the race in 2012. It was the tenth round of the 2014 Formula One season, and marked the 75th running of the German Grand Prix, and the 61st time the race has been run as a round of the Formula One World Championship. The race was won by local driver Nico Rosberg who started from pole. The event was noted for a poor fan turnout.

== Report ==
=== Background ===
Two weeks before the race, the FIA announced an immediate ban on the Front-and-Rear Interconnected suspension system (commonly abbreviated as FRIC), effective as of the German Grand Prix, arguing that the FRIC system qualified as a movable aerodynamic device under Article 3.15 of the technical regulations.

=== Qualifying ===
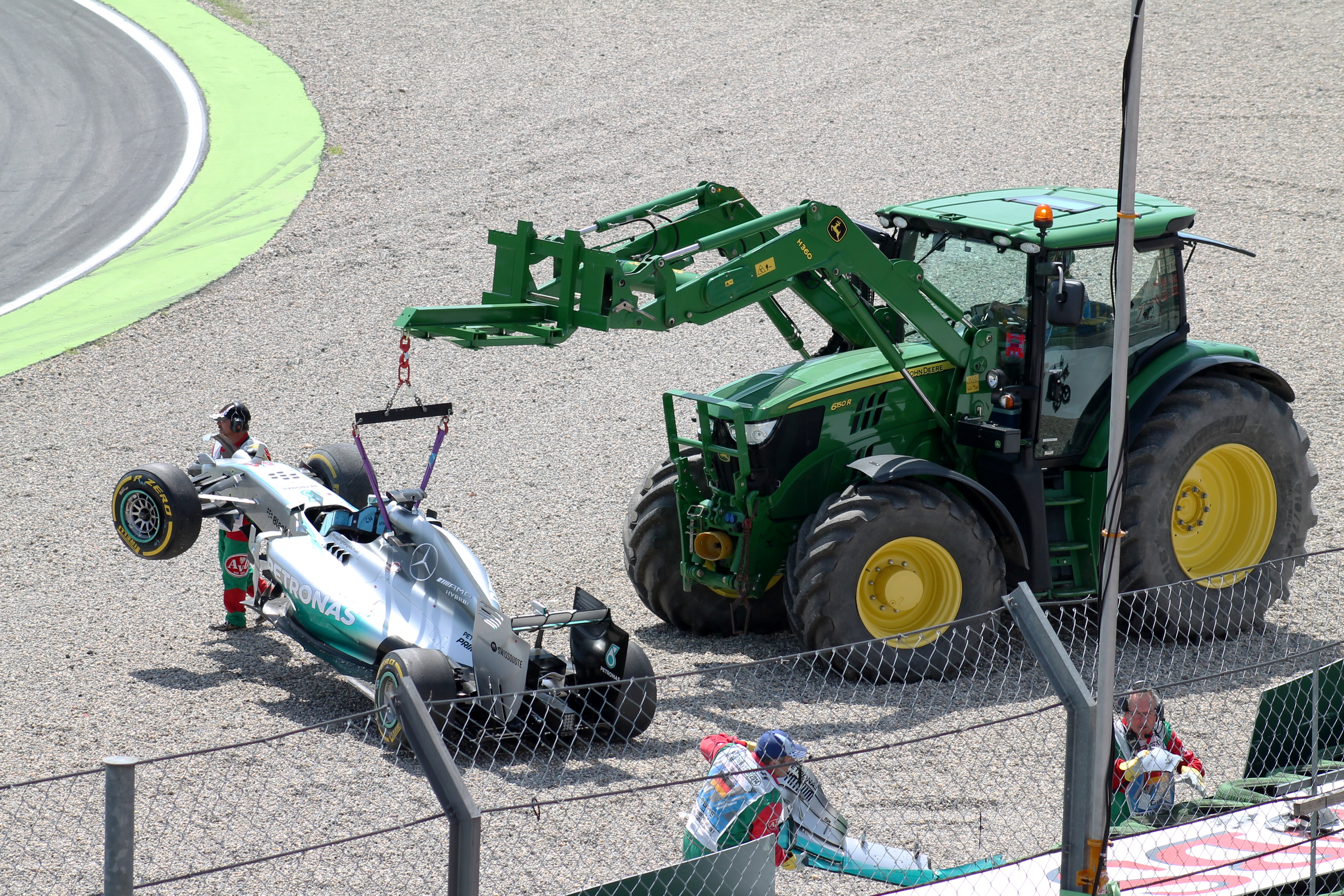
Lewis Hamilton's crashed Mercedes F1 W05 Hybrid being hoisted from the gravel at the Sachs Kurve

Following a failure in his Mercedes's right front brake disc during Q1, Lewis Hamilton lost control of his vehicle and was sent into the tyre wall of the left-handed Sachs Kurve. He was consigned to start 20th on the grid, his teammate Nico Rosberg snatching the pole. The crash left Hamilton "ok but sore", and he managed to participate on Sunday.

=== Race ===
At the start of the race, Nico Rosberg maintained his grid position to lead into the first corner. Felipe Massa and Kevin Magnussen got good starts from 3rd and 4th on the grid respectively. Massa's start was better than his second-placed teammate Valtteri Bottas's was, but instead of attempting to overtake his teammate Massa decided to back off slightly into the first corner to avoid risking contact. However, this left the fast-starting Magnussen with nowhere to go on the inside of turn one and the two collided, flipping over Massa's car and damaging Magnussen's front-right tyre. Massa retired from the race, but Magnussen was able to continue – although he dropped down to the back of the field. Daniel Ricciardo had to take evasive action to avoid the crash, and dropped down to 14th. As a result of the crash the safety car was deployed on the first lap.

The safety car pulled into the pits at the end of lap two and racing resumed. By lap 4 Hamilton had moved up from 20th on the grid to 13th place, while Ricciardo had moved up to 12th, with both drivers attempting to recover from their previous misfortunes. On lap 9 Daniil Kvyat attempted to overtake Sergio Pérez around the outside at turn 8, but didn't give the Mexican enough space and contact was made. Pérez's car was undamaged, but Kvyat spun off and lost time, though he was still able to continue. On lap 13 Hamilton simultaneously overtook both Kimi Räikkönen and Ricciardo on the inside at the hairpin – though he locked a wheel under braking and made slight contact with Räikkönen – to move up to seventh. Grosjean retired on lap 27 with a water leak.

On lap 30, Hamilton made contact with Jenson Button at the hairpin. As Button took a wide entry into the corner, Hamilton assumed Button was letting him through (just as he had done at the previous race in Silverstone) and attempted to pass on the inside. However, Button was actually taking the wide entry to ensure a better exit, and Hamilton's front wing made contact with Button's sidepod as Button took the corner. Hamilton lost some of his front wing endplate, but Button's car was undamaged. On the following lap Hamilton made a clean pass on the straight before the hairpin, putting his hand up to apologise to Button as he drove past. As a result of the increased tyre wear induced from losing part of his front wing, Hamilton had to switch from a two-stop strategy to a three-stop.

On lap 44 Kvyat's car set on fire as a result of an oil leak, and he pulled off the track and jumped out of his car to retire from the race. On lap 50 Adrian Sutil spun at the final corner and his engine stalled – with both Hamilton and Alonso having to swerve off the track to avoid the Sauber – leaving his car parked in the middle of the track around a blind corner, albeit off the racing line. Mercedes assumed the safety car would be deployed and pitted Hamilton earlier than planned (on lap 8 of a 13 lap stint on the super-soft tyres) in order to give him a chance to overtake the cars ahead at the restart and potentially win the race. However, the safety car was not deployed, as marshals were sent out onto the track under yellow flags to retrieve Sutil's car. After managing to get Sutil's car into neutral, the marshals successfully pushed it off of the track. The lack of a safety car being deployed meant that Hamilton would have to do a final stint of 16 laps on the super-soft tyres, instead of the initially intended 13 laps. Despite having lost some downforce as a result of the damage to his front wing, Hamilton began to catch third-placed Fernando Alonso at a rate of over three seconds per lap (setting the fastest lap of the race in the process) before passing him on lap 56. He then began to catch second-placed Bottas at a rate of around two seconds per lap. By lap 61, Hamilton had closed the gap to under a second, but his tyres had begun to wear out due to making his final stop earlier than planned. Hamilton's front-left tyre was particularly grained, a result of the increased wear incurred from losing part of his front wing. Bottas's tyres were in better shape, giving him more traction out of the corners, and combined with the Williams's superior straight-line speed this allowed him to defend on the DRS straights, defending into the hairpin by braking as late as possible.

Rosberg, who led the race from start to finish, crossed the line to win his fourth race of the season and became the first German driver to win the German Grand Prix in a German car in 75 years. Bottas, who had held off Hamilton for the final 7 laps, crossed the line 20.7 seconds behind Rosberg to take second – his third consecutive podium – with Hamilton finishing a further 1.7 seconds behind to take third. Sebastian Vettel finished fourth, 21.5 seconds behind Hamilton and 44 seconds behind Rosberg. Alonso and Ricciardo finished a very close 5th and 6th – Alonso finishing a mere 0.082 seconds ahead of Ricciardo – after the pair had been engaged in a close battle for position over the final 8 laps. Magnussen managed to score points after dropping down to the back of the field following his incident with Massa, ultimately finishing in 9th position.

==== Post-race ====
With his victory and with Lewis Hamilton finishing in third position, Nico Rosberg extended his championship lead from 4 points to 14 points.

Hamilton, Rosberg and Fernando Alonso were among the drivers who expressed their surprise at the fact that the safety car was not deployed to retrieve Sutil's stranded car, with Hamilton stating that he feared for the marshal's safety.

== Classification ==
=== Qualifying ===
| Pos. | No. | Driver | Constructor | Q1 | Q2 | Q3 | Grid |
|---|---|---|---|---|---|---|---|
| 1 | 6 | (Germany) Nico Rosberg | Mercedes | 1:17.631 | 1:17.109 | 1:16.540 | 1 |
| 2 | 77 | (Finland) Valtteri Bottas | Williams-Mercedes | 1:18.215 | 1:17.353 | 1:16.759 | 2 |
| 3 | 19 | (Brazil) Felipe Massa | Williams-Mercedes | 1:18.381 | 1:17.370 | 1:17.078 | 3 |
| 4 | 20 | (Denmark) Kevin Magnussen | McLaren-Mercedes | 1:18.260 | 1:17.788 | 1:17.214 | 4 |
| 5 | 3 | (Australia) Daniel Ricciardo | Red Bull Racing-Renault | 1:18.117 | 1:17.855 | 1:17.273 | 5 |
| 6 | 1 | (Germany) Sebastian Vettel | Red Bull Racing-Renault | 1:18.194 | 1:17.646 | 1:17.577 | 6 |
| 7 | 14 | (Spain) Fernando Alonso | Ferrari | 1:18.389 | 1:17.866 | 1:17.649 | 7 |
| 8 | 26 | (Russia) Daniil Kvyat | Toro Rosso-Renault | 1:18.530 | 1:18.103 | 1:17.965 | 8 |
| 9 | 27 | (Germany) Nico Hülkenberg | Force India-Mercedes | 1:18.927 | 1:18.017 | 1:18.014 | 9 |
| 10 | 11 | (Mexico) Sergio Pérez | Force India-Mercedes | 1:18.916 | 1:18.161 | 1:18.035 | 10 |
| 11 | 22 | (United Kingdom) Jenson Button | McLaren-Mercedes | 1:18.425 | 1:18.193 | | 11 |
| 12 | 7 | (Finland) Kimi Räikkönen | Ferrari | 1:18.534 | 1:18.273 | | 12 |
| 13 | 25 | (France) Jean-Éric Vergne | Toro Rosso-Renault | 1:18.496 | 1:18.285 | | 13 |
| 14 | 21 | (Mexico) Esteban Gutiérrez | Sauber-Ferrari | 1:18.739 | 1:18.787 | | 16^{1} |
| 15 | 8 | (France) Romain Grosjean | Lotus-Renault | 1:18.894 | 1:18.983 | | 14 |
| 16 | 44 | (United Kingdom) Lewis Hamilton | Mercedes | 1:18.683 | no time | | 20 ^{2} |
| 17 | 99 | (Germany) Adrian Sutil | Sauber-Ferrari | 1:19.142 | | | 15 |
| 18 | 17 | (France) Jules Bianchi | Marussia-Ferrari | 1:19.676 | | | 17 |
| 19 | 13 | (Venezuela) Pastor Maldonado | Lotus-Renault | 1:20.195 | | | 18 |
| 20 | 10 | (Japan) Kamui Kobayashi | Caterham-Renault | 1:20.408 | | | 19 |
| 21 | 4 | (United Kingdom) Max Chilton | Marussia-Ferrari | 1:20.489 | | | 21 |
107% time: 1:23.065
| NC | 9 | (Sweden) Marcus Ericsson | Caterham-Renault | no time^{3} | | | PL^{3} |

Notes:

- ^1 — Esteban Gutiérrez received a three place grid penalty as a result of an accident with Pastor Maldonado in the previous British Grand Prix.
- ^2 — Lewis Hamilton received a five-place grid penalty for a gearbox change.
- ^3 — Marcus Ericsson failed to set a lap time in Q1. He was later penalised with having to start from the pit lane and having to serve a 10-second stop and go penalty within the first three laps of the race, because his team failed to cover and seal his car before curfew and therefore breached Parc Fermé regulations.

=== Race ===
| Pos. | No. | Driver | Constructor | Laps | Time/Retired | Grid | Points |
|---|---|---|---|---|---|---|---|
| 1 | 6 | (Germany) Nico Rosberg | Mercedes | 67 | 1:33:42.914 | 1 | 25 |
| 2 | 77 | (Finland) Valtteri Bottas | Williams-Mercedes | 67 | +20.789 | 2 | 18 |
| 3 | 44 | (United Kingdom) Lewis Hamilton | Mercedes | 67 | +22.530 | 20 | 15 |
| 4 | 1 | (Germany) Sebastian Vettel | Red Bull Racing-Renault | 67 | +44.014 | 6 | 12 |
| 5 | 14 | (Spain) Fernando Alonso | Ferrari | 67 | +52.467 | 7 | 10 |
| 6 | 3 | (Australia) Daniel Ricciardo | Red Bull Racing-Renault | 67 | +52.549 | 5 | 8 |
| 7 | 27 | (Germany) Nico Hülkenberg | Force India-Mercedes | 67 | +1:04.178 | 9 | 6 |
| 8 | 22 | (United Kingdom) Jenson Button | McLaren-Mercedes | 67 | +1:24.711 | 11 | 4 |
| 9 | 20 | (Denmark) Kevin Magnussen | McLaren-Mercedes | 66 | +1 Lap | 4 | 2 |
| 10 | 11 | (Mexico) Sergio Pérez | Force India-Mercedes | 66 | +1 Lap | 10 | 1 |
| 11 | 7 | (Finland) Kimi Räikkönen | Ferrari | 66 | +1 Lap | 12 | |
| 12 | 13 | (Venezuela) Pastor Maldonado | Lotus-Renault | 66 | +1 Lap | 18 | |
| 13 | 25 | (France) Jean-Éric Vergne | Toro Rosso-Renault | 66 | +1 Lap | 13 | |
| 14 | 21 | (Mexico) Esteban Gutiérrez | Sauber-Ferrari | 66 | +1 Lap | 16 | |
| 15 | 17 | (France) Jules Bianchi | Marussia-Ferrari | 66 | +1 Lap | 17 | |
| 16 | 10 | (Japan) Kamui Kobayashi | Caterham-Renault | 65 | +2 Laps | 19 | |
| 17 | 4 | (United Kingdom) Max Chilton | Marussia-Ferrari | 65 | +2 Laps | 21 | |
| 18 | 9 | (Sweden) Marcus Ericsson | Caterham-Renault | 65 | +2 Laps | PL | |
| Ret | 99 | (Germany) Adrian Sutil | Sauber-Ferrari | 47 | Spun off | 15 | |
| Ret | 26 | (Russia) Daniil Kvyat | Toro Rosso-Renault | 44 | Oil leak | 8 | |
| Ret | 8 | (France) Romain Grosjean | Lotus-Renault | 26 | Water leak | 14 | |
| Ret | 19 | (Brazil) Felipe Massa | Williams-Mercedes | 0 | Collision | 3 | |

== Championship standings after the race ==
Drivers' Championship standings

| Pos. | Driver | Points |
|---|---|---|
| 1 | (Germany) Nico Rosberg | 190 |
| 2 | (United Kingdom) Lewis Hamilton | 176 |
| 3 | (Australia) Daniel Ricciardo | 106 |
| 4 | (Spain) Fernando Alonso | 97 |
| 5 | (Finland) Valtteri Bottas | 91 |

Constructors' Championship standings

| | Pos. | Constructor | Points |
|---|---|---|---|
| | 1 | (Germany) Mercedes | 366 |
| | 2 | (Austria) Red Bull Racing-Renault | 188 |
| 1 | 3 | (United Kingdom) Williams-Mercedes | 121 |
| 1 | 4 | (Italy) Ferrari | 116 |
| | 5 | Force India-Mercedes | 98 |

- Note: Only the top five positions are included for both sets of standings.

== See also ==
- 2014 Hockenheimring GP2 Series round
- 2014 Hockenheimring GP3 Series round

| Previous race: 2014 British Grand Prix | FIA Formula One World Championship; 2014 season | Next race: 2014 Hungarian Grand Prix |
| Previous race: 2013 German Grand Prix | German Grand Prix | Next race: 2016 German Grand Prix |
