= Propulsion Universelle et Récuperation d'Énergie =

Propulsion Universelle et Recuperation d'Energie
- Industry: Motorsport engineering
- Founded: 2011
- Founder: Craig Pollock
- Defunct: 2012
- Headquarters: Villars-sur-Ollon, Switzerland
- Key people: Gilles Simon

Propulsion Universelle et Récupération d'Énergie (PURE; English: Universal Propulsion and Energy Recovery) was a motorsports engineering company founded by former British American Racing team principal Craig Pollock in 2011. It aimed to design and manufacture engines for use under the 2014 Formula One technical regulations, that mandate a switch from the current normally aspirated V8 engines to turbocharged V6 engines. The company was linked to Mecachrome, and employed former members of Renault and Peugeot's 1990s Formula One engine programmes.

In July 2011, the company secured the services of Gilles Simon, formerly head of Scuderia Ferrari's engine department and the FIA technical director for powertrain development. The recruitment was controversial, with several teams and manufacturers – particularly Renault – expressing concerns that Simon's previous position with the FIA would grant him access to sensitive technical data about engine designs that could potentially be used by PURE in the development of their own engine. Simon and PURE rejected these suggestions, stating that the process of developing the 2014 engine regulations had been transparent, and that all parties involved had access to the same information so that no individual group would have an advantage. PURE used Toyota Motorsport's facilities in Cologne, Germany, whilst also maintaining a French base. In July 2012, PURE suspended its engine programme due to a lack of funding and later ceased operations.
