= Craig Pollock =

British businessman (b.1956)

- Born: 20 February 1956 (age 70); Falkirk, Scotland
- Occupation: Businessman
- Employer: Self employed

Craig Pollock (born February 20, 1956) is a British businessman. He was the manager of 1997 World Champion Formula One driver Jacques Villeneuve throughout his top-level career. Pollock was the founder of the British American Racing Formula One team, and served as its CEO and team principal from 1999 to 2002.

== Career ==
Pollock worked as a teacher in the late 1970s (Keith Grammar School) becoming director of sport (1981–85) at the College Beausoleil in Villars, Switzerland. Here he taught a young Jacques Villeneuve who had been sent to the school following the death of his Formula One driver father Gilles Villeneuve.

After leaving school Villeneuve pursued a career as a racing driver, following in his father's footsteps. Villeneuve entered Formula Three with Prema Powerteam in Italy and had relatively poor results. The two men were brought back together by a chance meeting at the Suzuka circuit. Villeneuve was invited by a Japanese photographer and fan of his late father to attend an event during the GP weekend. Pollock was attending on Honda related business. The meeting at the circuit led to three meetings in Switzerland when Villeneuve was pursuing the possibility of Pollock managing his career. Pollock accepted after the last meeting. Pollock's first initiative was to negotiate with Toyota Team TOM'S in Japan and move Villeneuve to Tokyo in 1992, where he could have the chance to work on his pure talent as a driver. During this year Pollock was contacted by Jean-Claude Torchia working for Imperial Tobacco in Montreal to see if Villeneuve would accept driving in the Formula Atlantic car at Trois-Rivières in Quebec. This opened the door for Pollock to commence future negotiations for Villeneuve's career in the States. A three year deal was signed.

In 1993, Villeneuve raced in American Formula Atlantic before breaking into IndyCars the following year in 1994. After winning at Road America in his rookie season, Villeneuve won the IndyCar championship and the prestigious Indianapolis 500 in 1995. Pollock used this winning streak to negotiate Villeneuve's entry into F1 with the Williams Racing team where he won the championship in his second year, 1997.

During Villeneuve's final year in IndyCar, Pollock had been working in the background to set up a new Formula One team when he had been told by Adrian Reynard that if he could get the funding, the engine supplier partner, and a driver for the team, he could count on Reynard to help.

Imperial Tobacco Canada was taken over by British American Tobacco (BAT) and the door was open for Pollock to use his contacts from the IndyCar success. Pollock convinced BAT to invest in the F1 project, using his old contacts from Imperial Tobacco, now working for BAT in the UK.

In 1998, Pollock purchased Tyrrell with his partners and ended up running the team in 1998, while at the same time building British American Racing (BAR) from a Greenfield site, Pollock signed his close friend and driver to be team leader. Immediately a controversial figure, Pollock almost immediately made numerous claims about how successful his team would be during the huge BAR F1 team launch by his partner and technical director of the team, Adrian Reynard, who announced in front of all journalists that "Reynard" had always obtained "pole position" in their first race, then "won" the Championship in their second season. BAR scored no points in their first year, due to unreliability.

Pollock spent his time working to improve the team so much that he successfully negotiated Honda's return to F1 with BAR. BAR Honda launched in 2000 and BAR Honda finished fifth in the Championship (fourth equal in points with Benetton) in the second season the new team.

Pollock managed Villeneuve through to the end of his Formula career.

Following Pollock's departure from BAR, he was contacted by Kevin Kalkhoven to return to Formula One and carry out a due diligence of the bankrupt Arrows Grand Prix International, but Pollock decided against it. Kalkhoven suggested that they enter the CART series and Pollock negotiated the purchase of the assets of PacWest Racing CART team and entered the CART championship for the 2003 series. Pollock managed this only for one season and requested that Kalkhoven purchase his shares to manage this team himself. During this period Pollock introduced Kalkhoven to a former business partner, Gerald Forsythe. From this introduction both Kalkhoven and Forsythe bought the series and Cosworth.

Pollock and Villeneuve ended their formal business relationship in January 2008 but remain close.

=== PURE ===
In May 2011, Pollock announced his creation of Propulsion Universelle et Récuperation d'Énergie (PURE SA), an engineering company which was set up to design and supply Power Units to F1 as an independent supplier. Pollock became the sole investor in PURE SA and due to the lack of outside investment (having invested his own personal wealth) decided to close the project in 2014, having terminated the full F1 power unit design. PURE SA was liquidated the same year and Pollock retained the intellectual property to the F1 power unit designs.

In July 2012, technical director Gilles Simon announced his departure from PURE in a general email sent out to suppliers and colleagues due to the financial difficulties the company was having. Since Simon's departure, PURE's financial trouble has been well publicised.
