= 2015 Monaco Grand Prix =

6th round of the 2015 Formula One season

Race 6 of 19 in the 2015 Formula One World Championship
← Previous race	Next race →
- Circuit de Monaco

Race details
- Date: 24 May 2015
- Official name: Formula 1 Grand Prix de Monaco 2015
- Location: Circuit de Monaco; La Condamine and Monte Carlo, Monaco
- Course: Street circuit
- Course length: 3.337 km (2.074 miles)
- Distance: 78 laps, 260.286 km (161.734 miles)
- Weather: Partly cloudy 18–19 °C (64–66 °F) air temperature 31–37 °C (88–99 °F) track temperature 1.5 m/s (4.9 ft/s) wind from the west
- Attendance: 200,000 (Weekend)

Pole position
Driver	(United Kingdom) Lewis Hamilton	Mercedes
- Time: 1:15.098

Fastest lap
Driver	(Australia) Daniel Ricciardo	Red Bull Racing-Renault
- Time: 1:18.063 on lap 74

Podium
First	(Germany) Nico Rosberg	Mercedes
Second	(Germany) Sebastian Vettel	Ferrari
Third	(United Kingdom) Lewis Hamilton	Mercedes

The 2015 Monaco Grand Prix, formally known as the Formula 1 Grand Prix de Monaco 2015, was a Formula One motor race that was held on 24 May 2015 at the Circuit de Monaco, a street circuit that runs through the principality of Monaco. It was the sixty-second running of the race as a World Championship event, and seventy-third running overall.

Mercedes driver Lewis Hamilton entered the race with a twenty-point lead over teammate and defending race winner Nico Rosberg in the Drivers' Championship, with Mercedes having a seventy-point lead over Ferrari in the Constructors' Championship.

World Champion Lewis Hamilton secured his first ever Monaco pole position during Saturday's qualifying. In the race, Nico Rosberg took his third consecutive win at Monaco, second win of the season, and the tenth of his career, while Sebastian Vettel finished second. Championship leader Hamilton, who had led for most of the race, moved from first into third place following a "pit stop misjudgement" during a late safety car period, for which his team, Mercedes, later apologised. The renewed McLaren-Honda partnership scored its first points since Honda's return to the sport. With Rosberg's victory, he was able to reduce his deficit in the World Drivers' Championship to ten points.

== Report ==
=== Background ===
Ahead of the race weekend, Mercedes announced they had extended their contract with world champion Lewis Hamilton for three additional years, keeping him at the team until the end of the 2018 season.

Revisions to the Tabac corner at the harbour section of the race track meant that the drivers now entered the turn slightly earlier, shortening the track by 3 metres (9.8 ft) compared to previous years, and making the corner slightly tighter and slower. The corner had seen a race-stopping accident involving Pastor Maldonado and Max Chilton in 2013, leading to the changes being made. This resulted in the circuit being officially classified as a new layout. The barrier on the right of the swimming pool chicane was moved back, with new kerbs, to allow for a better view of the corner. Much of the track was resurfaced before the event. As in Australia and Singapore, the pit lane speed limit for the duration of the event was reduced to 60 km/h (37 mph), instead of the standard 80 km/h (50 mph), due to the confined nature of the circuit. The race schedule for the weekend was different in Monaco compared to the other races on the calendar. The first two free practice sessions were held on Thursday instead of Friday.

Tyre supplier Pirelli brought its yellow-marked soft compound tyre as the harder "prime" tyre and the red-marked super-soft compound tyre as the more elastic "option" tyre, just as they did the previous three seasons. It was the first time in the 2015 season that the super-soft compound would be used at a race weekend.

=== Free practice ===
As per the regulations for 2015, three practice sessions were held, two one and a half-hour sessions on Thursday and another one-hour session on Saturday morning. After a thunderstorm on Wednesday night, the first of the two free practice sessions held on Thursday morning, started with every driver setting their installation laps on intermediate tyres. The track soon dried up, and the cars changed to slick tyres. Nico Rosberg had an early shunt when he clipped his front wing exiting the Tabac corner though he did not sustain considerable damage to his car. The two Mercedes drivers swapped places at the top of the time sheets for most of the session, until late improvements pushed Rosberg down the order to finish ninth, more than a second off his team-mate Lewis Hamilton. Rookie Max Verstappen surprised the paddock by finishing second, two-tenths of a second down on Hamilton. The Renault-powered cars all finished within the top seven, while the Williams team ended the session in tenth and seventeenth, owing to the car not being well suited for wet and low-temperature conditions.

The second session on Thursday afternoon saw considerably less running than the first. A red flag was shown ten minutes into practice after Roberto Merhi crashed on the exit of the tunnel. During the stoppage, rain began to fall, keeping most drivers in the garage when practice was restarted. It was not until ten minutes from the end of the session that the drivers took to the track again, but under damp conditions they managed times that were slower than the pace set at the beginning. Lewis Hamilton finished the session fastest, more than seven-tenths of a second in front of his teammate. Toro Rosso confirmed their high pace with Carlos Sainz Jr. and Max Verstappen in sixth and seventh respectively, while McLaren proved they might challenge for points as predicted, with Fernando Alonso in eighth place.

The third practice on Saturday morning was interrupted midway through the session when Kimi Räikkönen crashed his Ferrari at Sainte Dévote. His teammate Sebastian Vettel set the fastest lap during the session, ahead of the Mercedes' of Rosberg and Hamilton. Hamilton reported problems with his car, believed by his race engineer to be caused by over-pressured tyres. The two Renault-powered teams, Red Bull and Toro Rosso, confirmed their strong pace by placing all four cars in the top ten.

=== Qualifying ===
Qualifying consisted of three parts, 18, 15 and 12 minutes in length respectively, with five drivers eliminated from competing after each of the first two sessions. The first part (Q1) saw a "a surprise casualty" when Valtteri Bottas failed to cross the line for his final lap in time, leaving him seventeenth on the grid. The two Manor Marussia drivers finished last, as they had in every qualifying session they participated in up to that point during the 2015 season. Joining them on the sidelines were the two Sauber cars of Felipe Nasr and Marcus Ericsson, split by Bottas.

While McLaren once again succeeded in advancing both cars into Q2, Fernando Alonso's car stopped in the first corner due to an electrical fault at the start of the second session, and he took no further part in qualifying. Teammate Jenson Button was more successful, missing out on Q3 when his second fast lap was interrupted by Nico Rosberg going off at Sainte Dévote. The second Williams of Felipe Massa completed a problematic Saturday for the team, claiming only 14th on the grid, while Nico Hülkenberg and Romain Grosjean also did not make it into Q3.

The third part of qualifying, contested by the top ten drivers, started with drops of rain falling, meaning all drivers took to the track quickly. Sergio Pérez, who made his first Q3 appearance of the 2015 season, had only one set of super-soft tyres left and finished seventh. Lewis Hamilton took an early lead with his first run and teammate Nico Rosberg was denied a chance to challenge him for pole position when he made a mistake in turn one during his second fast lap. The two Red Bull drivers separated the two Ferrari cars, leaving Kimi Räikkönen with another disappointing qualifying performance down in sixth. It was the first pole position for Hamilton in Monaco, who called it "incredibly special".

Carlos Sainz Jr., who had qualified in eighth position, was adjudged to have missed a call to go to the weigh bridge during the first part of qualifying. Following the session, he was given a penalty which required him to start the race from the pit lane.

=== Race ===
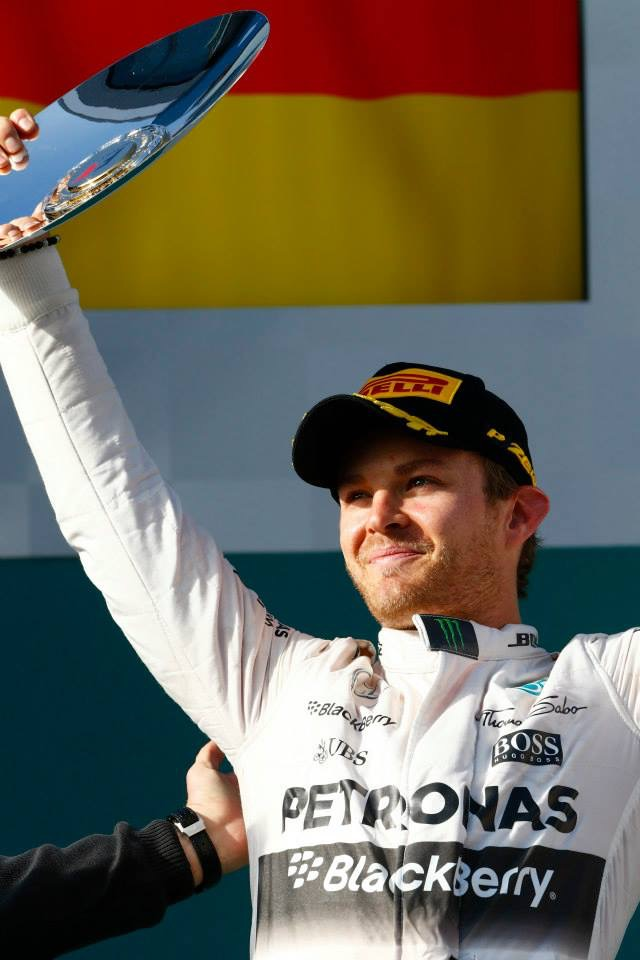
Nico Rosberg – pictured at the 2015 Australian Grand Prix – won the race for the third year in a row.

At the start of the race Hamilton, Rosberg and Vettel maintained their grid positions into the first corner, while Daniil Kvyat managed to overtake team-mate Daniel Ricciardo for fourth. Trying to get past Nico Hülkenberg on the inside of turn five, Fernando Alonso made contact with Hülkenberg, who hit the wall but was able to continue, though at the back of the field. Alonso was reprimanded with a five-second penalty to serve at his first pit stop. Meanwhile, Felipe Massa had also made contact with Hülkenberg, at Sainte Devote damaging his front wing. Massa came into the pit lane for a new wing and equipped the harder tyre compound. Pastor Maldonado suffered from brake problems in the early laps, eventually retiring on lap seven.

By lap ten, Hamilton had built a three-second lead over his teammate Rosberg, who was an additional 1.7 seconds ahead of Vettel. While some drivers came into the pit lane for their first regular stop as early as lap 13, the top runners stayed out until lap 37, when Vettel was the first to come in, followed by Rosberg and Hamilton one lap later respectively. Following the stops, Hamilton led Rosberg by seven seconds. Max Verstappen dropped down the order when a problem at the rear of the car caused him to be stationary for 31 seconds during his stop on lap 30. Fernando Alonso, who had been running in ninth place, retired from the race with a gearbox failure on lap 43. By lap 45, Hamilton had extended his lead to ten seconds, while Rosberg remained two seconds ahead of Sebastian Vettel.

By lap 59, Verstappen on the fast super-soft tyres was chasing Lotus driver Romain Grosjean for tenth position, with Verstappen making several attempts to pass over the following laps. At the beginning of lap 64, coming into turn one, Verstappen crashed into the back of the Lotus, sending him flying at 30g into the barriers. While he was able to walk away from the accident without injuries, a Virtual Safety Car condition was called by the race director to allow marshals to safely recover the damaged car. This was the first time a Virtual Safety Car had been used in Formula One. Shortly thereafter, the regular safety car was sent out on track. Lewis Hamilton, who had been leading the race by almost twenty seconds, was pitted apparently with the intention of returning him to the track ahead of his pursuers. The Mercedes pitwall crew, however, miscalculated the gap allowing Rosberg to take the lead while Hamilton emerged from the pit exit lane marginally behind Vettel who had stayed out under the safety car behind Rosberg. With the safety car coming into the pit lane on lap 70 of 78, Rosberg retained the lead unchallenged going on to win the Monaco Grand Prix for a third consecutive time whereas Hamilton finished third, unable to overtake Vettel for second position. Daniel Ricciardo had also made a pit stop under the safety car, and on fresh tyres he was able to pass Kimi Räikkönen in controversial circumstances. His teammate Kvyat then let him past in order to give him the chance to try and pass third-placed Hamilton. When Ricciardo was unable to overtake, he handed fourth place back to Kvyat. Ricciardo set the fastest lap of the race in the process. Jenson Button finished eighth, scoring four championship points for himself and the McLaren team, the first points for the renewed McLaren-Honda partnership since their return at the start of the 2015 season.

=== Post-race ===
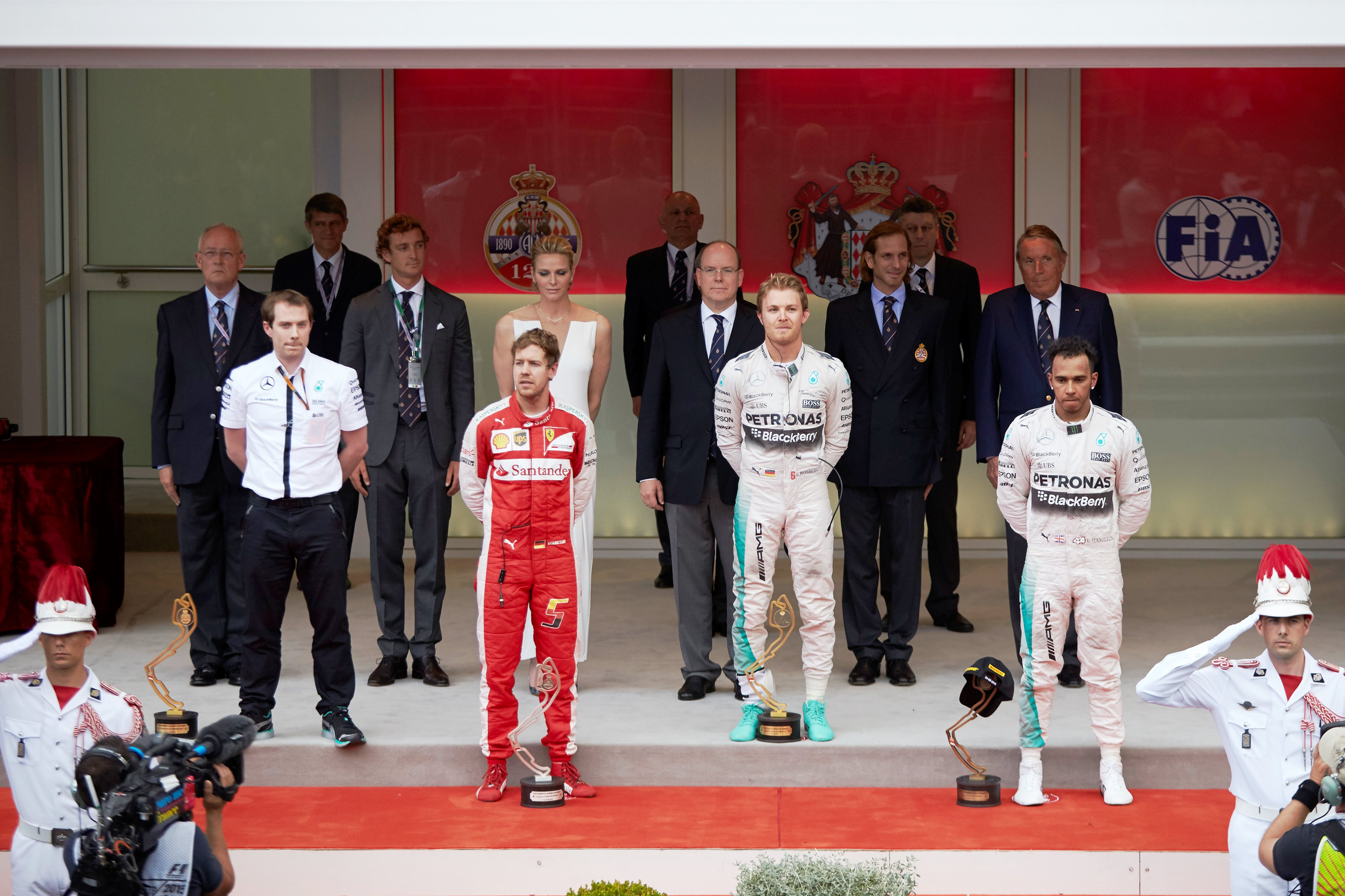
The podium ceremony

Following the race, Mercedes apologised to Hamilton for the pit call, which commentators such as F1Fanatic's Keith Collantine, Formula One correspondent for The Guardian Paul Weaver, and former Formula One driver David Coulthard said that cost him the victory. Team boss Toto Wolff told the press: "We got our numbers wrong. We thought we had the gap for Lewis to take fresh tyres and come back out in the lead behind the safety car, ahead of Nico and covering off any risk of another competitor taking fresh tyres. But the calculation was incorrect and he came out in third place." More than half of the teams pitted at least one car when the safety car was deployed, some with less of a gap to the car behind, though none other driver lost any position. Hamilton, as race leader, caught up with the safety car in sector 2 already and thus lost a considerable amount of time on his way into the pit lane compared to every other driver, causing him to exit behind Rosberg and Vettel.

During the post-race press conference, Hamilton revealed the decision to pit him was made after he had voiced concern over the heat in his tyres, being under the false impression that his rivals behind had already made a pit stop for the softer compound. When asked whether he would have full confidence in the team's strategy decisions in the future, he answered "yes". At the podium interviews, conducted by Martin Brundle, Rosberg admitted his victory "was just a lot of luck" and added that "Lewis drove brilliantly and he would have also deserved the win for sure". Rosberg became the fourth driver overall, and the first since Ayrton Senna, to win the Monaco Grand Prix three times in a row.

Following the accident with Romain Grosjean, the race stewards handed Max Verstappen a five-place grid penalty for the next race, the Canadian Grand Prix. For the first time in his Formula One career, Verstappen also had two penalty points added to his FIA Super Licence. Verstappen was criticised for his actions by fellow driver Felipe Massa, who said that he deserved the penalty. Verstappen reacted by insisting that he had done nothing wrong, instead pointing to Massa's own accident at the 2014 Canadian Grand Prix, where Massa had crashed into the back of Sergio Pérez in similar fashion. Immediately following the race, Verstappen had accused Grosjean of "brake-testing" him, a claim denied by Grosjean, who insisted that he had braked even later than the lap before.

The race results meant that Nico Rosberg moved closer towards his teammate's championship lead, now ten points behind Hamilton. Sebastian Vettel followed another 18 points behind. Meanwhile, in the Constructors' Championship, Mercedes extended their lead over Ferrari to 84 points.

== Classification ==
=== Qualifying ===
Pos.	Car no.	Driver	Constructor	Qualifying times			Final grid
Pos.	Car no.	Driver	Constructor	Q1	Q2	Q3	Final grid
1	44	(United Kingdom) Lewis Hamilton	Mercedes	1:16.588	1:15.864	1:15.098	1
2	6	(Germany) Nico Rosberg	Mercedes	1:16.528	1:15.471	1:15.440	2
3	5	(Germany) Sebastian Vettel	Ferrari	1:17.502	1:16.181	1:15.849	3
4	3	(Australia) Daniel Ricciardo	Red Bull Racing-Renault	1:17.254	1:16.706	1:16.041	4
5	26	(Russia) Daniil Kvyat	Red Bull Racing-Renault	1:16.845	1:16.453	1:16.182	5
6	7	(Finland) Kimi Räikkönen	Ferrari	1:17.660	1:16.440	1:16.427	6
7	11	(Mexico) Sergio Pérez	Force India-Mercedes	1:17.376	1:16.999	1:16.808	7
8	55	(Spain) Carlos Sainz Jr.	Toro Rosso-Renault	1:17.246	1:16.762	1:16.931	PL^{2}
9	13	(Venezuela) Pastor Maldonado	Lotus-Mercedes	1:17.630	1:16.775	1:16.946	8
10	33	(Netherlands) Max Verstappen	Toro Rosso-Renault	1:16.750	1:16.546	1:16.957	9
11	8	(France) Romain Grosjean	Lotus-Mercedes	1:17.767	1:17.007		15^{1}
12	22	(United Kingdom) Jenson Button	McLaren-Honda	1:17.492	1:17.093		10
13	27	(Germany) Nico Hülkenberg	Force India-Mercedes	1:17.552	1:17.193		11
14	19	(Brazil) Felipe Massa	Williams-Mercedes	1:17.679	1:17.278		12
15	14	(Spain) Fernando Alonso	McLaren-Honda	1:17.778	1:26.632		13
16	12	(Brazil) Felipe Nasr	Sauber-Ferrari	1:18.101			14
17	77	(Finland) Valtteri Bottas	Williams-Mercedes	1:18.434			16
18	9	(Sweden) Marcus Ericsson	Sauber-Ferrari	1:18.513			17
19	28	(United Kingdom) Will Stevens	Marussia-Ferrari	1:20.655			18
20	98	(Spain) Roberto Merhi	Marussia-Ferrari	1:20.904			19
107% time: 1:21.884

Notes

- ^1— Romain Grosjean received a five-place grid penalty for an unscheduled gearbox change.
- ^2— Carlos Sainz Jr. was made to start from the pit lane for bypassing a weight request following Q1.

=== Race ===
Pos.	No.	Driver	Constructor	Laps	Time/Retired	Grid	Points
1	6	(Germany) Nico Rosberg	Mercedes	78	1:49:18.420	2	25
2	5	(Germany) Sebastian Vettel	Ferrari	78	+ 4.486	3	18
3	44	(United Kingdom) Lewis Hamilton	Mercedes	78	+ 6.053	1	15
4	26	(Russia) Daniil Kvyat	Red Bull Racing-Renault	78	+ 11.965	5	12
5	3	(Australia) Daniel Ricciardo	Red Bull Racing-Renault	78	+ 13.608	4	10
6	7	(Finland) Kimi Räikkönen	Ferrari	78	+ 14.345	6	8
7	11	(Mexico) Sergio Pérez	Force India-Mercedes	78	+ 15.013	7	6
8	22	(United Kingdom) Jenson Button	McLaren-Honda	78	+ 16.063	10	4
9	12	(Brazil) Felipe Nasr	Sauber-Ferrari	78	+ 23.626	14	2
10	55	(Spain) Carlos Sainz Jr.	Toro Rosso-Renault	78	+ 25.056	PL	1
11	27	(Germany) Nico Hülkenberg	Force India-Mercedes	78	+ 26.232	11	
12	8	(France) Romain Grosjean	Lotus-Mercedes	78	+ 28.415	15	
13	9	(Sweden) Marcus Ericsson	Sauber-Ferrari	78	+ 31.159	17	
14	77	(Finland) Valtteri Bottas	Williams-Mercedes	78	+ 45.789	16	
15	19	(Brazil) Felipe Massa	Williams-Mercedes	77	+ 1 Lap	12	
16	98	(Spain) Roberto Merhi	Marussia-Ferrari	76	+ 2 Laps	19	
17	28	(United Kingdom) Will Stevens	Marussia-Ferrari	76	+ 2 Laps	18	
Ret	33	(Netherlands) Max Verstappen	Toro Rosso-Renault	62	Collision	9	
Ret	14	(Spain) Fernando Alonso	McLaren-Honda	41	Gearbox	13	
Ret	13	(Venezuela) Pastor Maldonado	Lotus-Mercedes	5	Brakes	8	

== Championship standings after the race ==
Drivers' Championship standings

Pos.	Driver	Points
1	(United Kingdom) Lewis Hamilton	126
2	(Germany) Nico Rosberg	116
3	(Germany) Sebastian Vettel	98
4	(Finland) Kimi Räikkönen	60
5	(Finland) Valtteri Bottas	42

Constructors' Championship standings

Pos.	Constructor	Points
1	(Germany) Mercedes	242
2	(Italy) Ferrari	158
3	(United Kingdom) Williams-Mercedes	81
4	(Austria) Red Bull Racing-Renault	52
5	(Switzerland) Sauber-Ferrari	21

- Note: Only the top five positions are included for both sets of standings.

== See also ==
- 2015 Monaco GP2 Series round

Previous race: 2015 Spanish Grand Prix	FIA Formula One World Championship; 2015 season	Next race: 2015 Canadian Grand Prix
Previous race: 2014 Monaco Grand Prix	Monaco Grand Prix	Next race: 2016 Monaco Grand Prix
