= 2014 Austrian Grand Prix =

Race 8 of 19 in the 2014 Formula One World Championship
| ← Previous race | Next race → |
- Layout of the Red Bull Ring

Race details
- Date: 22 June 2014
- Official name: Formula 1 DHL Grosser Preis Von Österreich 2014
- Location: Red Bull Ring; Spielberg, Styria, Austria
- Course: Permanent racing facility
- Course length: 4.326 km (2.684 miles)
- Distance: 71 laps, 307.146 km (190.564 miles)
- Weather: Partially cloudy, hot and dry
- Attendance: 77,702

Pole position
| Driver | (Brazil) Felipe Massa | Williams-Mercedes |
- Time: 1:08.759

Fastest lap
| Driver | (Mexico) Sergio Pérez | Force India-Mercedes |
- Time: 1:12.142 on lap 59

Podium
| First | (Germany) Nico Rosberg | Mercedes |
| Second | (United Kingdom) Lewis Hamilton | Mercedes |
| Third | (Finland) Valtteri Bottas | Williams-Mercedes |

The 2014 Austrian Grand Prix (formally the Formula 1 Grosser Preis Von Österreich 2014) was a Formula One motor race held on 22 June 2014 at the Red Bull Ring in Spielberg, Austria. It was the eighth round of the 2014 season and marked the 28th running of the Austrian Grand Prix and the 27th time it had been held as a round of the Formula One World Championship. It was the first Austrian Grand Prix held since 2003. The 71-lap race was won by Mercedes driver Nico Rosberg after starting from third position. His teammate Lewis Hamilton finished second with Valtteri Bottas third for the Williams team.

Felipe Massa started the race from pole position, his first since the 2008 Brazilian Grand Prix and the last of his career. Massa had one previous participation in an Austrian Grand Prix, back in 2002, while from the last Austrian Grand Prix to be held before 2014, which was in 2003, only three drivers (Fernando Alonso, Kimi Räikkönen, and Jenson Button) returned to drive in the 2014 Austrian Grand Prix.

== Report ==
=== Background ===
The Grand Prix was contested by eleven teams, each of two drivers. The teams, also known as constructors, were Red Bull Racing, Mercedes, Ferrari, Lotus, McLaren, Force India, Sauber, Toro Rosso, Williams, Marussia and Caterham. Tyre supplier Pirelli brought four different tyre compounds for the race; two dry compounds, the soft "primes" and the supersoft "options", and two wet-weather compounds, the intermediate and full wet. The drag reduction system (DRS) had two activation zones for the race; one was on the start/finish straight from the final to first corners, and the second on the straight between turns 2 and 3.

Going into the race, Mercedes driver Nico Rosberg led the Drivers' Championship with 140 points, ahead of teammate Lewis Hamilton on 118 points and Daniel Ricciardo on 79. Fernando Alonso was fourth on 69 points while Sebastian Vettel was fifth on 60 points. In the Constructors' Championship Mercedes were leading with 258 points and Red Bull were second on 139 points. Ferrari with 87 points and Force India with 77 points contended for third place, with McLaren fifth on 66 points. Mercedes had so far dominated the championship, winning six out of the previous seven races, with Ricciardo winning the Canadian Grand Prix. Championship competitor Kevin Magnussen had gained one second-place finish, while Jenson Button, Vettel (twice), Sergio Pérez and Alonso had achieved third place podium finishes.

=== Practice and qualifying ===
Nico Rosberg was the fastest in the first free practice session with a lap time of 1:11.295. Teammate Lewis Hamilton was the fastest in the second free practice session with a lap time of 1:09.542. Valtteri Bottas was the fastest in the third free practice session with a lap time of 1:09.848.

Williams driver Felipe Massa became the first driver other than Hamilton and Rosberg to claim pole position in 2014 with a Q3 lap time of 1:08.759. He was joined on the front row by teammate Valtteri Bottas; it was the team's first front row lockout since Juan Pablo Montoya and Ralf Schumacher did so, at the 2003 German Grand Prix at Hockenheim.

Hamilton failed to post a time in Q3, ending up ninth on the grid after Sergio Pérez's penalty was applied. On his first flying lap in Q3 – having been 0.4 seconds faster than Bottas' provisional pole time of 1:08.846 through the first two sectors – Hamilton ran wide at the final corner and had his lap time deleted for exceeding track limits. On his second and final lap, Hamilton locked his rear brakes under braking for turn 2 and spun. Sebastian Vettel failed to reach Q3, although his teammate Daniel Ricciardo did.

=== Race ===
At the start, Massa led the field into the first corner, with Rosberg passing Bottas, but being repassed the following straight. Hamilton gained five places on the first lap, after passing two cars on the run into the first corner and two further cars heading towards turn 2, before taking another spot from Fernando Alonso at turn 7. As a result, he ended the first lap only one position and 0.9 seconds behind his teammate, despite starting ninth. Sebastian Vettel once again suffered from technical problems, losing drive on the first lap and attempting to retire on lap two. However, his car then regained drive and he was able to continue, albeit a lap down. After damaging his front wing halfway through the race, he later retired from Red Bull Racing's home Grand Prix on lap 34.

At the front, the Mercedes cars were able to pass the Williams cars by stopping earlier and undercutting them during the pitstop phases. Rosberg passed both Williams' during the first stops, and Hamilton took second position during the second round, despite suffering two slow pit stops. Sergio Pérez once again drove a good race with a different tyre strategy, only running the super soft compound for the last 16 laps and successfully challenging Kevin Magnussen for sixth place, despite starting sixteenth following a grid penalty.

For much of the race both Mercedes cars had to manage overheating brake issues. On lap 55 Hamilton was held up by backmarkers, losing around a second. During the final laps, Hamilton was slowly gaining on teammate Rosberg, and despite having lost a total of 1.9 seconds to his teammate through slower pit stops he began the final lap 1.1 seconds behind. However, he was not close enough to his teammate to challenge him and backed off at the end of the lap. Rosberg took the chequered flag for his third win of the season.

=== Post-race ===
As a result of the race, Nico Rosberg extended his championship lead to 29 points, the largest it had been all season.

Lewis Hamilton admitted he was frustrated by his slow pit stops, but said that second was still a "good result" considering his qualifying position.

Fernando Alonso, who managed to finish closely behind Felipe Massa in the Williams and with a smaller gap to Mercedes than usual, later described the race as his best of the season so far.

The race was a remarkable one for Mercedes Team Principal Toto Wolff, who in being a shareholder of both Mercedes and his former team Williams effectively held some ownership of the 1st, 2nd, 3rd, and 4th placed cars in the race. This achievement was sweetened by it coming at the Austrian's home race.

Valtteri Bottas scored his first career Formula One podium with a P3 finish.

== Classification ==
=== Qualifying ===
| Pos. | No. | Driver | Constructor | Q1 | Q2 | Q3 | Grid |
|---|---|---|---|---|---|---|---|
| 1 | 19 | (Brazil) Felipe Massa | Williams-Mercedes | 1:10.292 | 1:09.239 | 1:08.759 | 1 |
| 2 | 77 | (Finland) Valtteri Bottas | Williams-Mercedes | 1:10.356 | 1:09.096 | 1:08.846 | 2 |
| 3 | 6 | (Germany) Nico Rosberg | Mercedes | 1:09.695 | 1:08.974 | 1:08.944 | 3 |
| 4 | 14 | (Spain) Fernando Alonso | Ferrari | 1:10.405 | 1:09.479 | 1:09.285 | 4 |
| 5 | 3 | (Australia) Daniel Ricciardo | Red Bull Racing-Renault | 1:10.395 | 1:09.638 | 1:09.466 | 5 |
| 6 | 20 | (Denmark) Kevin Magnussen | McLaren-Mercedes | 1:10.081 | 1:09.473 | 1:09.515 | 6 |
| 7 | 26 | (Russia) Daniil Kvyat | Toro Rosso-Renault | 1:09.678 | 1:09.490 | 1:09.619 | 7 |
| 8 | 7 | (Finland) Kimi Räikkönen | Ferrari | 1:10.285 | 1:09.657 | 1:10.795 | 8 |
| 9 | 44 | (United Kingdom) Lewis Hamilton | Mercedes | 1:09.514 | 1:09.092 | No time | 9 |
| 10 | 27 | (Germany) Nico Hülkenberg | Force India-Mercedes | 1:10.389 | 1:09.624 | No time | 10 |
| 11 | 11 | (Mexico) Sergio Pérez | Force India-Mercedes | 1:10.124 | 1:09.754 | | 15^{1} |
| 12 | 22 | (United Kingdom) Jenson Button | McLaren-Mercedes | 1:10.252 | 1:09.780 | | 11 |
| 13 | 1 | (Germany) Sebastian Vettel | Red Bull Racing-Renault | 1:10.630 | 1:09.801 | | 12 |
| 14 | 13 | (Venezuela) Pastor Maldonado | Lotus-Renault | 1:10.821 | 1:09.939 | | 13 |
| 15 | 25 | (France) Jean-Éric Vergne | Toro Rosso-Renault | 1:10.161 | 1:10.073 | | 14 |
| 16 | 8 | (France) Romain Grosjean | Lotus-Renault | 1:10.461 | 1:10.642 | | PL^{2} |
| 17 | 99 | (Germany) Adrian Sutil | Sauber-Ferrari | 1:10.825 | | | 16 |
| 18 | 21 | (Mexico) Esteban Gutiérrez | Sauber-Ferrari | 1:11.349 | | | 17 |
| 19 | 17 | (France) Jules Bianchi | Marussia-Ferrari | 1:11.412 | | | 18 |
| 20 | 10 | (Japan) Kamui Kobayashi | Caterham-Renault | 1:11.673 | | | 19 |
| 21 | 4 | (United Kingdom) Max Chilton | Marussia-Ferrari | 1:11.775 | | | 21^{3} |
| 22 | 9 | (Sweden) Marcus Ericsson | Caterham-Renault | 1:12.673 | | | 20 |
107% time: 1:14.379

Notes:

- ^1 — Sergio Pérez was given a five-place grid penalty for changing his racing line and causing an avoidable collision in the Canadian Grand Prix.
- ^2 — Romain Grosjean qualified 16th, but started from pit lane after gearbox and set-up changes.
- ^3 — Max Chilton was given a three-place grid penalty for causing an avoidable collision with Jules Bianchi at the Canadian Grand Prix.

=== Race ===
| Pos. | No. | Driver | Constructor | Laps | Time/Retired | Grid | Points |
|---|---|---|---|---|---|---|---|
| 1 | 6 | (Germany) Nico Rosberg | Mercedes | 71 | 1:27:54.976 | 3 | 25 |
| 2 | 44 | (United Kingdom) Lewis Hamilton | Mercedes | 71 | +1.932 | 9 | 18 |
| 3 | 77 | (Finland) Valtteri Bottas | Williams-Mercedes | 71 | +8.172 | 2 | 15 |
| 4 | 19 | (Brazil) Felipe Massa | Williams-Mercedes | 71 | +17.357 | 1 | 12 |
| 5 | 14 | (Spain) Fernando Alonso | Ferrari | 71 | +18.553 | 4 | 10 |
| 6 | 11 | (Mexico) Sergio Pérez | Force India-Mercedes | 71 | +28.546 | 15 | 8 |
| 7 | 20 | (Denmark) Kevin Magnussen | McLaren-Mercedes | 71 | +32.031 | 6 | 6 |
| 8 | 3 | (Australia) Daniel Ricciardo | Red Bull Racing-Renault | 71 | +43.522 | 5 | 4 |
| 9 | 27 | (Germany) Nico Hülkenberg | Force India-Mercedes | 71 | +44.137 | 10 | 2 |
| 10 | 7 | (Finland) Kimi Räikkönen | Ferrari | 71 | +47.777 | 8 | 1 |
| 11 | 22 | (United Kingdom) Jenson Button | McLaren-Mercedes | 71 | +50.966 | 11 | |
| 12 | 13 | (Venezuela) Pastor Maldonado | Lotus-Renault | 70 | +1 Lap | 13 | |
| 13 | 99 | (Germany) Adrian Sutil | Sauber-Ferrari | 70 | +1 Lap | 16 | |
| 14 | 8 | (France) Romain Grosjean | Lotus-Renault | 70 | +1 Lap | PL | |
| 15 | 17 | (France) Jules Bianchi | Marussia-Ferrari | 69 | +2 Laps | 18 | |
| 16 | 10 | (Japan) Kamui Kobayashi | Caterham-Renault | 69 | +2 Laps | 19 | |
| 17 | 4 | (United Kingdom) Max Chilton | Marussia-Ferrari | 69 | +2 Laps | 21 | |
| 18 | 9 | (Sweden) Marcus Ericsson | Caterham-Renault | 69 | +2 Laps | 20 | |
| 19 | 21 | (Mexico) Esteban Gutiérrez | Sauber-Ferrari | 69 | +2 Laps | 17 | |
| Ret | 25 | (France) Jean-Éric Vergne | Toro Rosso-Renault | 59 | Brakes | 14 | |
| Ret | 1 | (Germany) Sebastian Vettel | Red Bull Racing-Renault | 34 | Electronics | 12 | |
| Ret | 26 | (Russia) Daniil Kvyat | Toro Rosso-Renault | 24 | Suspension | 7 | |

== Championship standings after the race ==
Drivers' Championship standings

| Pos. | Driver | Points |
|---|---|---|
| 1 | (Germany) Nico Rosberg | 165 |
| 2 | (United Kingdom) Lewis Hamilton | 136 |
| 3 | (Australia) Daniel Ricciardo | 83 |
| 4 | (Spain) Fernando Alonso | 79 |
| 5 | (Germany) Sebastian Vettel | 60 |

Constructors' Championship standings

| | Pos. | Constructor | Points |
|---|---|---|---|
| | 1 | (Germany) Mercedes | 301 |
| | 2 | (Austria) Red Bull Racing-Renault | 143 |
| | 3 | (Italy) Ferrari | 98 |
| | 4 | Force India-Mercedes | 87 |
| 1 | 5 | (United Kingdom) Williams-Mercedes | 85 |

- Note: Only the top five positions are included for both sets of standings.

== See also ==
- 2014 Red Bull Ring GP2 Series round
- 2014 Red Bull Ring GP3 Series round

| Previous race: 2014 Canadian Grand Prix | FIA Formula One World Championship; 2014 season | Next race: 2014 British Grand Prix |
| Previous race: 2003 Austrian Grand Prix | Austrian Grand Prix | Next race: 2015 Austrian Grand Prix |
