= 2014 Canadian Grand Prix =

Race 7 of 19 in the 2014 Formula One World Championship
← Previous race	Next race →
- Layout of the Circuit Gilles Villeneuve

Race details
- Date: 8 June 2014
- Official name: Formula 1 Grand Prix du Canada 2014
- Location: Circuit Gilles Villeneuve, Montreal, Quebec
- Course: Street circuit
- Course length: 4.361 km (2.710 miles)
- Distance: 70 laps, 305.270 km (189.686 miles)
- Weather: Temperatures up to 27.6 °C (81.7 °F); wind speeds up to 16.4 kilometres per hour (10.2 mph)

Pole position
Driver	(Germany) Nico Rosberg	Mercedes
- Time: 1:14.874

Fastest lap
Driver	(Brazil) Felipe Massa	Williams-Mercedes
- Time: 1:18.504 on lap 58

Podium
First	(Australia) Daniel Ricciardo	Red Bull Racing-Renault
Second	(Germany) Nico Rosberg	Mercedes
Third	(Germany) Sebastian Vettel	Red Bull Racing-Renault

The 2014 Canadian Grand Prix (officially the Formula 1 Grand Prix du Canada 2014) was a Formula One motor race held at the Circuit Gilles Villeneuve in Montreal, Quebec, on 8 June. It was the seventh race of the 2014 Formula One World Championship and the 45th time the Canadian Grand Prix formed part of the series. Red Bull Racing driver Daniel Ricciardo won the 70-lap race from sixth position. Nico Rosberg finished in second position for Mercedes and Ricciardo's teammate Sebastian Vettel took third.

Heading into the race, Rosberg led the World Drivers' Championship and Mercedes led the World Constructors' Championship. Rosberg took the pole position by setting the fastest lap in the third qualifying session. He held off his teammate Lewis Hamilton to lead the field into the first corner. The race was neutralised with the safety car on the same lap due to a crash between Marussia teammates Max Chilton and Jules Bianchi, which ended Chilton’s streak of 25 straight races without a retirement. Rosberg maintained the lead until his first pit stop on the 18th lap. Rosberg retook it from his teammate Hamilton on lap 19. Kinetic motor–generator unit failures slowed both Rosberg and Hamilton just after halfway through the race. Rosberg made a pit stop at the end of lap 44. Hamilton led that lap and the next before his own pit stop. Williams driver Felipe Massa took the lead for the following two laps and relinquished it back to Rosberg on the 48th lap. Ricciardo overtook Sergio Pérez of Force India for second on lap 66, and Rosberg two laps later. Competitive racing ended with the safety car's deployment on the final lap due to a first turn accident between Massa and Pérez that saw both drivers briefly hospitalised. Ricciardo took the first victory of his career and the first for an Australian driver since 2012.

The result increased Rosberg's lead in the World Drivers' Championship to 22 championship points over his teammate Hamilton who retired with overheating rear brakes. Ricciardo's victory advanced him to third, demoted Fernando Alonso of Ferrari to fourth and elevated Vettel to fifth. In the World Constructors' Championship, Mercedes maintained its lead over Red Bull in second. Ferrari, Force India and McLaren all maintained third to fifth with 12 races left in the season.

== Background ==
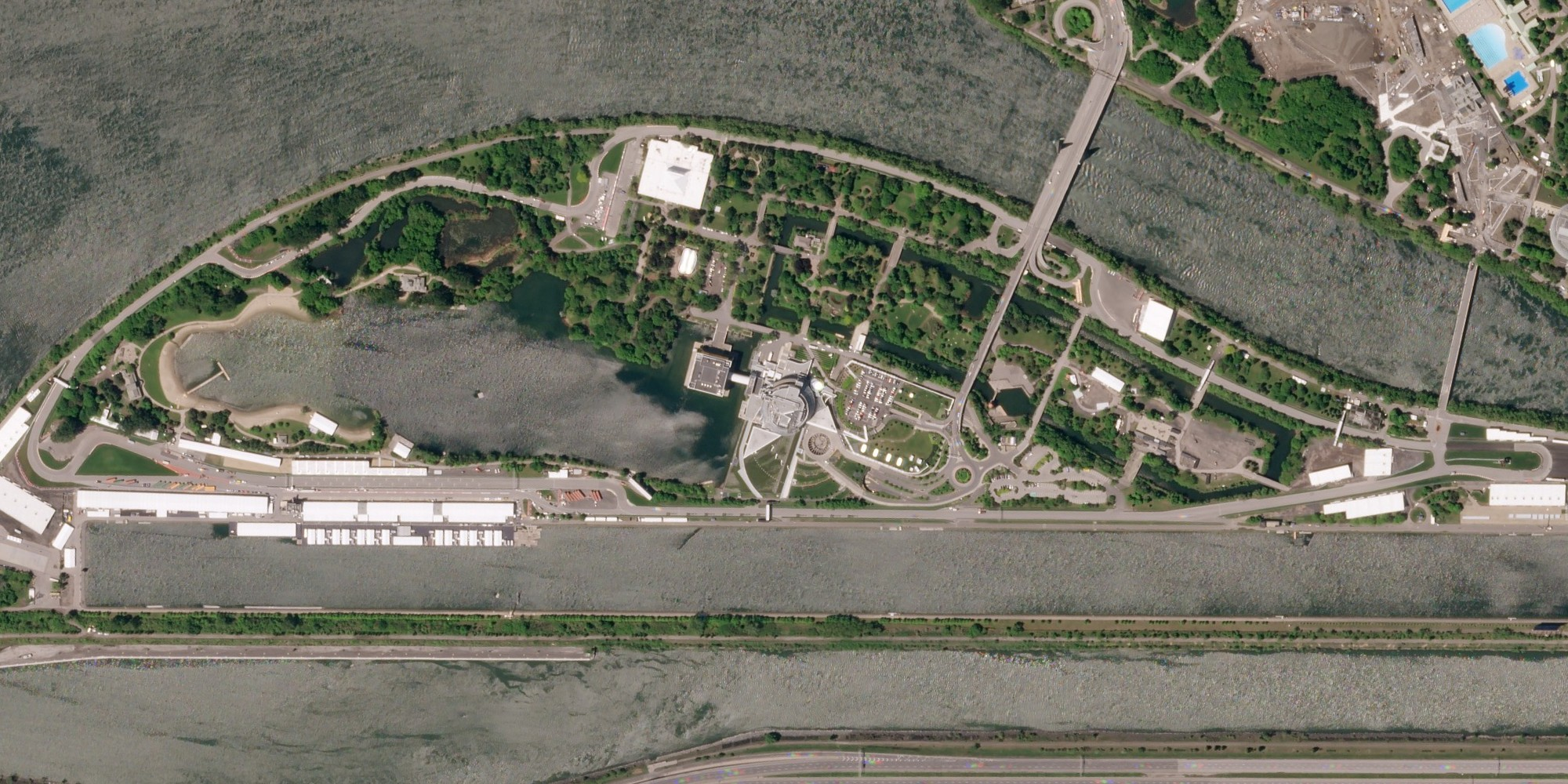
The Circuit Gilles Villeneuve (pictured in 2018), where the race was held.

The 2014 Canadian Grand Prix was the 7th of 19 races of the 2014 Formula One World Championship, and the 45th running of the event as part of the series. It was held at the 14-turn 4.361 km (2.710 mi) Circuit Gilles Villeneuve in Montreal, Quebec on 8 June. Tyre supplier Pirelli brought the yellow-banded soft compound and the red-banded supersoft compound tyres to the race. The drag reduction system (DRS) had two activation zones for the race: one was on the main straight linking turns 11 and 12 and the second was on the straight between the 13th and first corners. After the 2013 round, gravel to the outside of turn 10 and turn 13 was replaced by an asphalt surface. A barrier at turn 13 was moved further back and its debris fence updated. New guardrail posts were built so that there was no space more than 2 m (6.6 ft).

After winning the preceding Monaco Grand Prix, Mercedes driver Nico Rosberg led the World Drivers' Championship with 122 championship points, four ahead of his teammate Lewis Hamilton in second. Fernando Alonso of Ferrari was in third with 61 championship points, and Red Bull's Daniel Ricciardo was seven championship points behind him in fourth. Force India driver Nico Hülkenberg was fifth with 47 championship points. In the World Constructors' Championship, Mercedes led with 240 championship points, and Red Bull was second with 99 championship points. Ferrari with 78 championship points and Force India with 67 championship points contended for third position. McLaren completed the top five with 52 championship points.

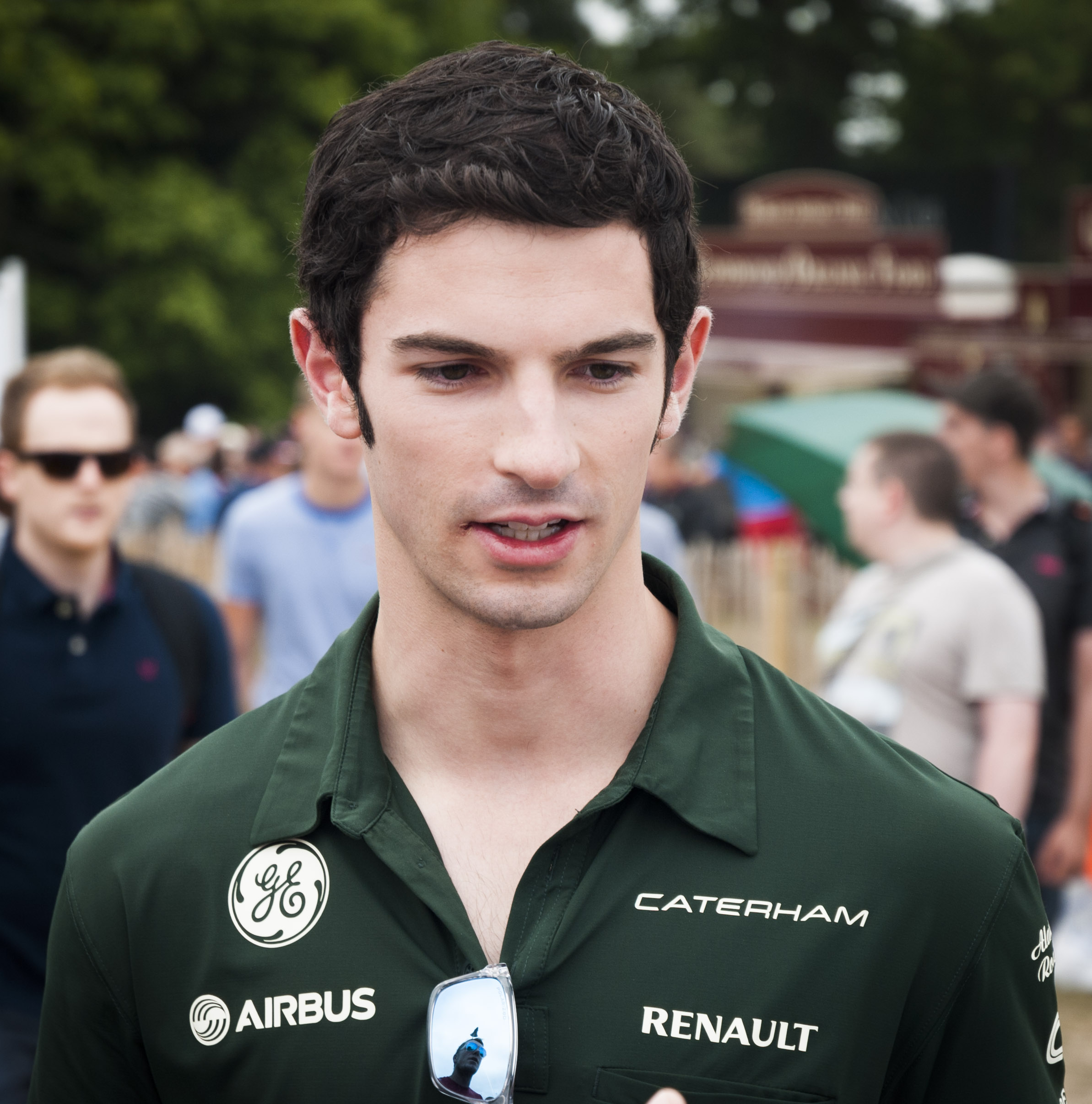
Alexander Rossi (pictured in 2013) drove for Caterham for the first time in 2014 during the first practice session.

Mercedes had won every race up to the Canadian Grand Prix and Rosberg took the Drivers' Championship lead with a win at Monaco; his relationship with Hamilton diminished after the latter felt Rosberg prevented him from taking pole position during qualifying in contentious circumstances. Both drivers spoke to each other before the event and Hamilton declared their relationship restored. Rosberg said his relationship with Hamilton had not been affected and commented on the situation, "We're fighting every single race weekend, it's me against him and there's nobody else. So that definitely makes it more difficult and there's more at stake. There is the opportunity of winning the championship this year – that is the ultimate goal in racing – so there's a lot at stake." Hamilton had won in Canada three times in 2007, 2010 and 2012 and said that the track's long straights would help Mercedes, "We have a very good power curve on our engine, Mercedes have done the best job with the engines. Renault (Red Bull's power-plant supplier) and Ferrari would have to have done an exceptional job coming into this weekend, in terms of that area, to be able to keep up with us on the straights."

A total of 11 teams (each representing a different constructor) each fielded two race drivers with one change of driver for the first free practice session. GP2 Series participant and Caterham reserve driver Alexander Rossi drove the CT05 in lieu of Kamui Kobayashi for the first time in 2014. In technical developments, Mercedes installed fins and turning vanes to the F1 W05 Hybrid's lower front wishbone on its front suspension and the rear section of its frontal brake ducts. This was to improve airflow and lessen drag to the inside of the front wheel. Toro Rosso built new exhaust systems for their two cars following the development of fractures from possible overheating that led to their retirements in Monaco. On the FW36, Williams mounted a duct over the top of its brake discs to divert airflow from the main duct to the outside of the caliper. Ferrari tested a tighter-mounted engine cover that went to the inside of the rear tyres. It featured longer sidepods to better cool the F14 T and removed downforce. During practice, McLaren used a rear suspension blocker to replace some downforce lost on the MP4-29 with the lower rear wing's removal at the cost of including drag.

== Practice ==
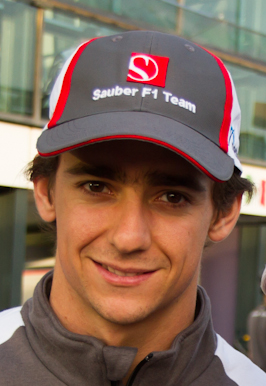
Esteban Gutiérrez missed qualifying after crashing in the third practice session.

Per the regulations for the 2014 season, three practice sessions were held, two 90-minute sessions on Friday and another 60-minute session on Saturday. The first practice session was held under heavy cloud cover that threatened a heavy rain shower. Alonso was fastest with a benchmark lap of 1:17.238. He was ahead of the Mercedes duo of Hamilton and Rosberg. The Red Bull duo of Sebastian Vettel and Ricciardo were fourth and sixth; they were separated by Valtteri Bottas for Williams. Jenson Button, his McLaren teammate Kevin Magnussen, Ferrari driver Kimi Räikkönen and Toro Rosso's Jean-Éric Vergne rounded out the top ten fastest drivers. During the session, several drivers went off the circuit because of a low amount of grip and unable to get the optimum tyre temperature. Jules Bianchi damaged a right track rod on his Marussia from contact against a wall at turn four. Hülkenberg spun by putting his wheels in the grass at the turn eight chicane. Williams driver Felipe Massa stopped early with an ERS battery issue.

After the session, Ricciardo was summoned by the stewards and was reprimanded for the first time in the season; he was judged to have passed Lotus driver Pastor Maldonado in a potentially unsafe manner to other drivers in the pit lane at the conclusion of practice. Hamilton recorded the day's fastest lap, a 1:16.118 in the second practice session. His teammate Rosberg was second and Vettel third. The two Ferraris of Räikkönen and Alonso were fourth and fifth, Massa was sixth with his teammate Bottas seventh. Mangussen, Button and Vergne followed in the top ten. Several drivers again ran off the circuit during the session. A suspected fuel leak caused Daniil Kvyat to end his running early after completing nine laps. Bianchi was restricted to three slow laps because of engine issues that would require an overnight change of engine.

The third practice session took place in warm weather conditions. Hamilton used the soft compound tyres to record the fastest time of 1:15.610. Massa was second and Rosberg third. Alonso was fourth and his teammate Räikkönen sixth; Ricciardo separated the two in fifth. Bottas, Kvyat, Vergne and Vettel were in positions seven to ten. The session was red flagged 15 minutes in when Esteban Gutiérrez had a loss of control at the rear of his Sauber's braking through the turn three and four chicane. He struck an outside barrier at its exit, causing damage to his car's left-rear. Sauber discovered its front was too heavily damaged; Gutiérrez would miss qualifying because the team's spare chassis had to be constructed for the race on Sunday.

== Qualifying ==
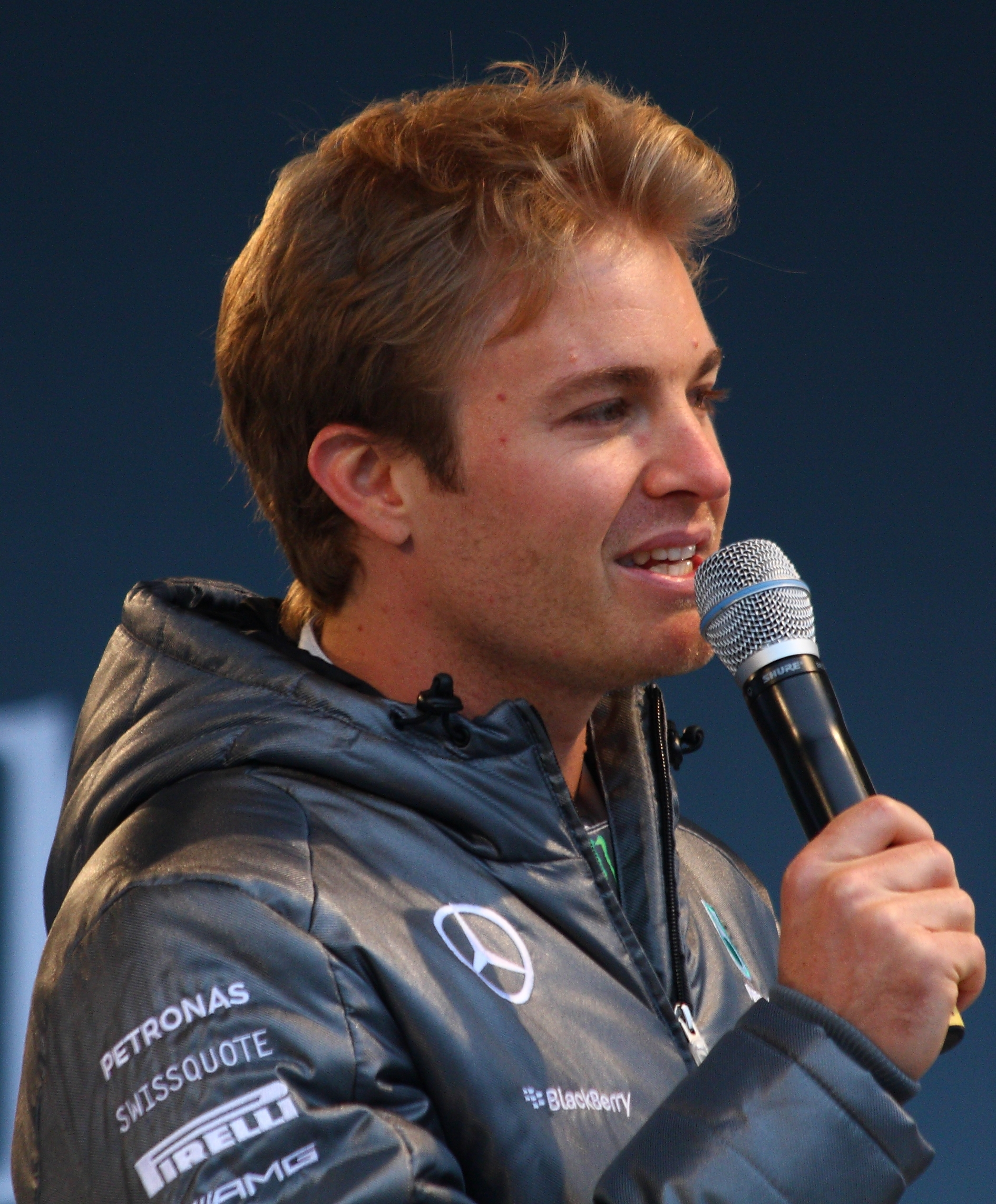
Nico Rosberg secured the seventh pole position of his career.

Saturday afternoon's qualifying session was divided into three parts. The first part ran for 18 minutes, eliminating cars that finished the session 17th or below. The 107% rule was in effect, requiring drivers to reach a time within 107 per cent of the quickest lap to qualify. The second session lasted 15 minutes, eliminating cars that finished 11th to 16th. The final session ran for 12 minutes and determined pole position to 10th. Cars who progressed to the final session were not allowed to change tyres for the race's start, using the tyres with which they set their quickest lap times in the second session. The weather was sunny with the asphalt temperature 47 °C (117 °F). Rosberg led the third session to take his second consecutive pole position, his third of the season, and the seventh of his career with a 1:14.874 lap. He was joined on the grid's front row by his teammate Hamilton who was 0.079 seconds slower after driver errors at turns six and eight and slower traffic delayed him. Vettel took more risks in his driving and placed third in the final seconds of qualifying. Traffic affected Bottas' front tyre warming and left him in fourth. His teammate Massa in fifth had a front-left brake temperature issue that locked his front wheel at turn one. Ricciardo in sixth was beaten in qualifying by his teammate Vettel for the second time in 2014. The Ferraris of Alonso and Räikkönen lacked grip and took seventh and 10th; they were separated by Vergne and Button after the latter altered his car's balance.

Hülkenberg in 11th was the fastest driver not to qualify in the top 10. He was joined by Magnussen in 12th and Hülkenberg's teammate Sergio Pérez was 13th. 14th-placed Romain Grosjean could not better his lap because he missed an opportunity to set another lap one second after the second session ended. Brake and handling difficulties left Kvyat in 15th position. Sauber's Adrian Sutil used two sets of super soft compound tyres in the first session and set one timed lap in the second session to qualify 16th. Maldonado failed to advance beyond the first session due to a turbocharger intake problem. He stopped at the exit of turn three after his engineers asked him to stop. 18th-placed Max Chilton relied on a lap he established on his first attempt because qualifying was stopped for an accident in the first session. His teammate Bianchi in 19th could not emerge on track for a second try because his car failed to start. Kobayashi had an improved balance on his Caterham and went faster on his final attempt to take 20th; Marcus Ericsson in the second Caterham took 21st and caused a stoppage in the first session with a crash at the exit of the first chicane with 16 seconds to go.

=== Post-qualifying ===
The stewards gave Maldonado his first reprimand of the season because he did not refit his steering wheel after vacating his car as required by the Formula One regulations at the exit of turn three. Gutiérrez was allowed to start the race at the stewards discretion for meeting time requirements in practice. He was required to begin from the pit lane because Sauber changed the gearbox and the chassis of his car as a result of his third practice accident. Kobayashi incurred a five-place grid penalty for changing his car's gearbox.

=== Qualifying classification ===
The fastest lap in each of the three sessions is denoted in bold.

Pos.	No.	Driver	Constructor	Q1	Q2	Q3	Grid
1	6	(Germany) Nico Rosberg	Mercedes	1:16.471	1:15.289	**1:14.874**	1
2	44	(United Kingdom) Lewis Hamilton	Mercedes	**1:15.750**	**1:15.054**	1:14.953	2
3	1	(Germany) Sebastian Vettel	Red Bull Racing-Renault	1:17.470	1:16.109	1:15.548	3
4	77	(Finland) Valtteri Bottas	Williams-Mercedes	1:16.772	1:15.806	1:15.550	4
5	19	(Brazil) Felipe Massa	Williams-Mercedes	1:16.666	1:15.773	1:15.578	5
6	3	(Australia) Daniel Ricciardo	Red Bull Racing-Renault	1:17.113	1:15.897	1:15.589	6
7	14	(Spain) Fernando Alonso	Ferrari	1:17.010	1:16.131	1:15.814	7
8	25	(France) Jean-Éric Vergne	Toro Rosso-Renault	1:17.178	1:16.255	1:16.162	8
9	22	(United Kingdom) Jenson Button	McLaren-Mercedes	1:16.631	1:16.214	1:16.182	9
10	7	(Finland) Kimi Räikkönen	Ferrari	1:17.013	1:16.245	1:16.214	10
11	27	(Germany) Nico Hülkenberg	Force India-Mercedes	1:16.897	1:16.300	N/A	11
12	20	(Denmark) Kevin Magnussen	McLaren-Mercedes	1:16.446	1:16.310	N/A	12
13	11	(Mexico) Sergio Pérez	Force India-Mercedes	1:18.235	1:16.472	N/A	13
14	8	(France) Romain Grosjean	Lotus-Renault	1:17.732	1:16.687	N/A	14
15	26	(Russia) Daniil Kvyat	Toro Rosso-Renault	1:16.938	1:16.713	N/A	15
16	99	(Germany) Adrian Sutil	Sauber-Ferrari	1:17.519	1:17.314	N/A	16
17	13	(Venezuela) Pastor Maldonado	Lotus-Renault	1:18.328	N/A	N/A	17
18	4	(United Kingdom) Max Chilton	Marussia-Ferrari	1:18.348	N/A	N/A	18
19	17	(France) Jules Bianchi	Marussia-Ferrari	1:18.359	N/A	N/A	19
20	10	(Japan) Kamui Kobayashi	Caterham-Renault	1:19.278	N/A	N/A	21^{1}
21	9	(Sweden) Marcus Ericsson	Caterham-Renault	1:19.820	N/A	N/A	20
107% time: 1:21.052
NC^{2}	21	(Mexico) Esteban Gutiérrez	Sauber-Ferrari	No Time^{2}	N/A	N/A	PL^{3}

Notes

- **^1** – Kamui Kobayashi was imposed a five-place grid penalty for a gearbox change.
- **^2** – Esteban Gutiérrez did not take part in qualifying because his team was unable to repair his damaged car during the Saturday morning practice session in time. He was allowed to start the race on the stewards' discretion.
- **^3** – Gutiérrez began from the pit lane because his car's gearbox and chassis were changed as a result of his accident during the final practice session.

== Race ==
Weather forecasts expected the race to be partially cloudy and warm; conditions in itself were sunny and warm. The air temperature was between 27 and 28 °C (81 and 82 °F) and the track temperature ranged from 44 to 49 °C (111 to 120 °F); Every driver from first to 10th began on the supersoft compound tyres, and most teams, except for Force India planned for two pit stops. When the race commenced at 14:00 local time, Hamilton made a faster start than his teammate Rosberg. The latter locked up entering the first corner and drifted wide in front of Hamilton as he aggressively fended off the former to the right. That put Hamilton onto some grass and allowed Vettel into second. At the entry to turn three, Chilton lost control of the rear of his Marussia, and oversteered into the car of his teammate Bianchi. Bianchi was launched airborne as his and Chilton's wheels interlocked. He spun into a barrier beside the track. Bianchi was unhurt and he and Chilton retired. The accident prompted the safety car's deployment since track marshals were needed to clear oil and debris laid on the circuit.

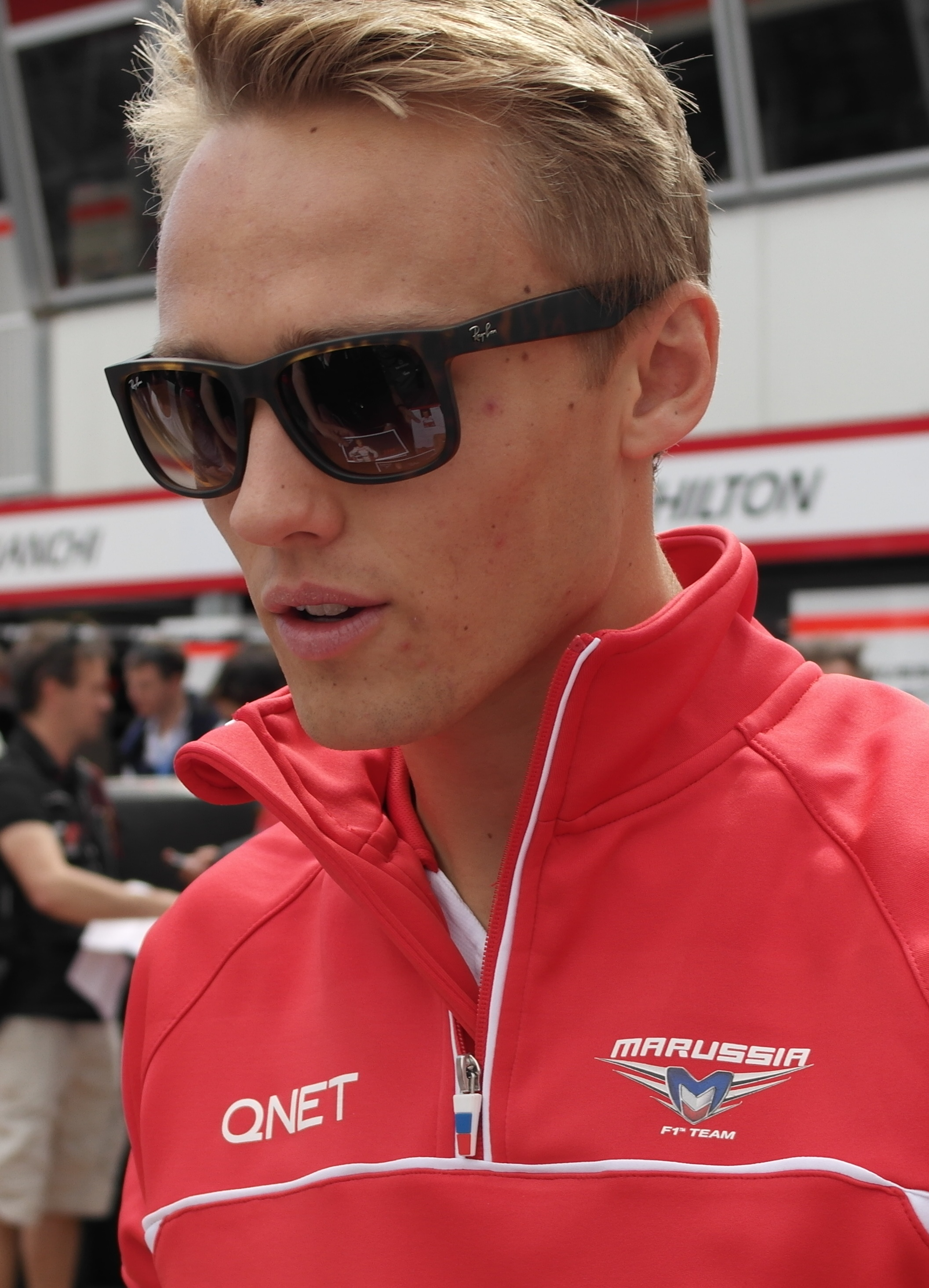
Max Chilton (pictured in 2013) retired in a first-lap accident with his teammate Jules Bianchi.

The field conserved fuel under the safety car, which helped drivers to save fuel and those on a one-stop strategy. The safety car was withdrawn at the end of lap seven. On lap eight, Rosberg immediately drew clear from Vettel whose Red Bull car was slower by about 10 km/h (6.2 mph) on a straight. Pérez passed Button on the approach to the final chicane for 10th on that lap. On the next lap, a turbocharger connector pipe failure on Ericsson's car prompted his retirement in the pit lane to prevent engine damage. Kvyat oversteered and spun at turn one on the 10th lap; he fell to the rear of the field. On the same lap, Hamilton used DRS to pass Vettel on the back straight going into the last chicane for second position. Sixth-placed Ricciardo was delayed by the Williams pair of Bottas and Massa, whom he could not pass due to a slower pace on a straight. Behind him, Vergne delayed the Ferrari pair of Alonso and Räikkönen, Pérez and Button. Pérez's super soft compound tyres began degrading by around laps 13 and 14. Ricciardo made a pit stop at the conclusion of lap 13 in his attempt to pass both of the Williams drivers through an undercut.

Williams responded by calling Bottas into the pit lane for the soft compound tyres on lap 15. The same was done with his teammate Massa on the next lap. Vettel was about six seconds behind Hamilton by his own pit stop on the lap for the soft compound tyres, rejoining ahead of Bottas and Ricciardo. On the 17th lap, Alonso made a pit stop and his higher speed moved him past Vergne for seventh. Rosberg was more than two seconds ahead of Hamilton, when he entered the pit lane one lap later. Hamilton took the lead on lap 18 and maintained it before his own pit stop on lap 19. Rosberg clipped a kerb on the inside of turn four and lost control at the rear on that lap; he narrowly avoided contact with a barrier and continued. Afterwards, Rosberg led with Hamilton second and the Force India duo of Pérez and Hülkenberg third and fourth. Vettel's slower pace caused by him being unable to overtake Hülkenberg on the straights because of the Force Indias quicker pace allowed Bottas and Ricciardo to draw closer. On the 21st lap, Kvyat illegally drove across the final run-off area to avoid an overtake by Räikkönen. Maldonado retired with a loss of engine power on the following lap.

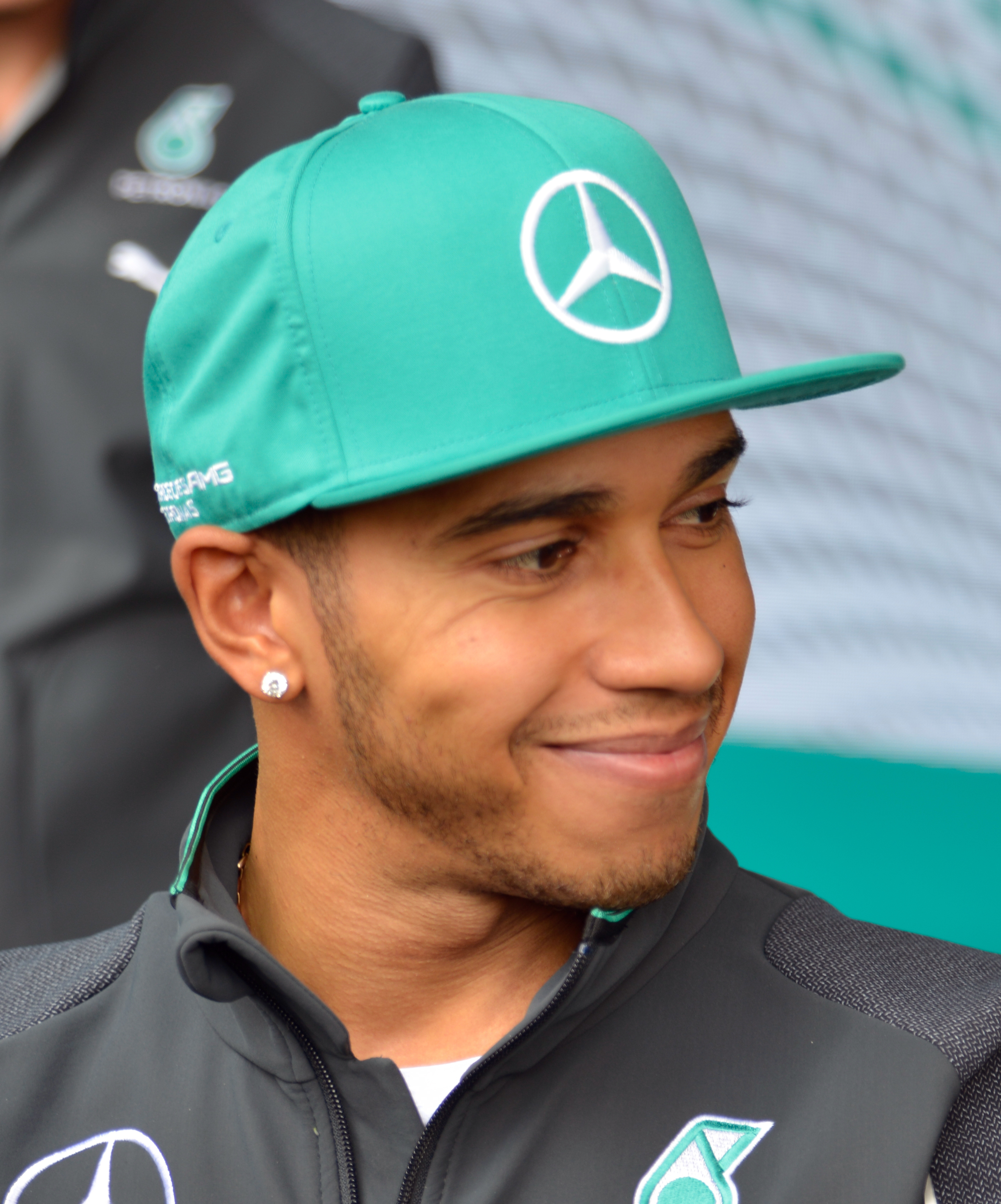
Lewis Hamilton (pictured in 2014) retired with overheating brakes after 47 laps.

During the 23rd lap, a loss of rear car control put Vettel wide during an attempted pass on Hülkenberg at the hairpin. After a half spin at turn one lap 25, a rear-left wheel problem caused Kobayashi to retire after the first chicane. As Hamilton slipstreamed Rosberg on the main straight that lap, his teammate locked his tyres into the final chicane and cut the corner. The stewards investigated Rosberg; he was not penalised. Hamilton's race engineer Pete Bonnington advised the former not to take risks. Further down the field, Massa passed Alonso on the outside through the first and second turns for eighth on the 27th lap. Hamilton drew to within less than a second behind Rosberg on lap 28 and had DRS available the following lap. In the meantime, Button overtook Kvyat around the inside at the hairpin for 12th and Vettel held off Bottas at the final chicane. Pérez in third managed his super soft tyres enough by his teammate Hülkenberg holding off two quicker drivers to prompt Force India to extend his stint on them since it allowed Pérez to not overstress his super soft tyres. On lap 35, he made a pit stop to switch to the soft compound tyres and rejoined the circuit in 10th.

Bottas entered the pit lane from fifth on lap 36 in his attempt to pass Vettel through the undercut. Red Bull responded by bringing Vettel in on the next lap and was able to rejoin ahead of Bottas. Hamilton had drawn close to his teammate Rosberg; Mercedes observed warm temperatures on both cars' engine control systems on the kinetic motor–generator units. Hamilton's failed into turn 10 on lap 36 and Rosberg's shut down on the approach to turn one on lap 37, losing their engines 160 hp (120 kW) of electrical boost, and overworking their brakes because energy could not be harvested by the energy recovery system. That lowered their top speed on the straight by 32 km/h (20 mph) and were four seconds a lap slower than before after instructions to restart the electric control systems were unsuccessful. Hülkenberg made his pit stop to replace his soft tyres with super soft compounds on lap 41. Williams put the third-placed Massa on a one-stop strategy due to Mercedes' reduced pace. Rosberg entered the pit lane on lap 44; a delay with the installation of his left-front tyre elevated Hamilton to the lead.

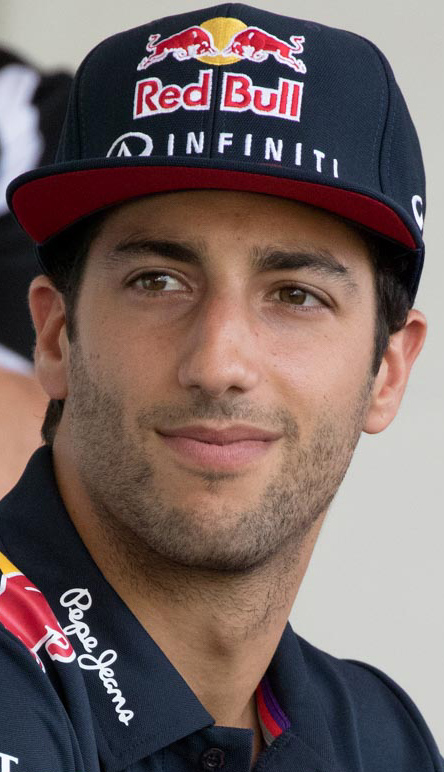
Daniel Ricciardo (pictured in 2015) took his maiden career victory and the first for an Australian since Mark Webber in 2012.

Hamilton's second pit stop on lap 46 overheated his rear brake discs, as Massa took the lead. An error from Hamilton at the hairpin that lap allowed Rosberg to claim second from his teammate. Hamilton then slipstreamed back past with DRS; he ran onto a run-off area at the final corner, and passed Rosberg, before relinquishing second position to his teammate. He ran off the track twice more, and was retired in the pit lane at the start of lap 48. Tyre wear on Massa's car prompted Williams to revert to a two-stop strategy. He entered the pit lane at the end of that lap. Rosberg retook the lead on the following lap, ahead of the fast closing group of Pérez, Ricciardo, Vettel, Bottas and Massa. Mercedes told him to go faster in the first sector to prevent Pérez from using DRS on the straight. On lap 49, Kvyat retired with a drivetrain fault at the hairpin. On the 57th lap, Bottas' had tyres that were 12 laps older than his teammate Massa's. Bottas had an overheating engine and brakes because of the time he spent in traffic, and locked his flat-spotted tyres at the hairpin to allow his teammate Massa past. He then used DRS to overtake Hülkenberg; Massa passed Bottas on that lap.

Massa passed Hülkenberg for fifth before the final chicane on that lap. He drew closer to Vettel and Ricciardo on lap 57, and set the race's fastest lap on the following lap, at 1:18.504. On lap 60, Alonso on the inside overtook Bottas for seventh between turns one and two. Bottas lost eighth to Button soon after. Grosjean retired with a broken rear wing on the following lap. On lap 64, Vettel narrowly avoided hitting the rear of his teammate Ricciardo under braking for the hairpin. Vettel ran wide to prevent a collision, which allowed Massa to turn onto the inside line as Vettel jerked in turn 11. Massa gained on Vettel on the long straight; he did not pass him because he forgot to use DRS. In the meantime, Pérez had rear brake-by-wire malfunctions that meant he had trouble braking. On the 66th lap, Ricciardo used DRS, and steered to the outside to pass Pérez for second entering turn one; Pérez was distracted by Force India telling him over the radio which switch changes were needed to reset his brake-by-wire sensor and went too deep into the chicane. He braked heavily to get round the turn, and went onto the grass at the corner. That caused Vettel to nearly hit Pérez's car in the following concertina effect.

Ricciardo lowered Rosberg's lead to seven-tenths of a second between laps 66 and 67. Gutiérrez entered the pit lane with an energy storage system failure on the 67th lap. On the back straight down to the last chicane at lap 68, Ricciardo used DRS to pass Rosberg for the lead. On the next lap, Pérez went off the racing line and Vettel found space to overtake him for third at the end of the back straight. Pérez was slow on the start/finish straight from having an untidy exit out of the final corner. At the beginning of the final lap, Massa got a run on Pérez but his front right tyre and Pérez's left-rear wheel collided. Pérez rammed into a barrier at 32G, as Massa narrowly avoided collecting Vettel en route into the inside tyre wall in a 27G impact. The safety car was deployed to neutralise the race and Ricciardo took his first career victory, the first for an Australian since Mark Webber won the 2012 British Grand Prix. Rosberg finished second and Vettel third. Off the podium, Button, Hülkenberg, Alonso, Bottas, Vergne, Magnussen, Räikkönen, Pérez, Massa, Sutil and Gutiérrez were the final finishers.

=== Post-race ===
At the podium interviews, conducted by the 1995 winner of the race Jean Alesi, Ricciardo said he was in shock over his first career win, "This is ridiculous! Lots of Aussie flags, that's nice... It's just an amazing feeling right now, I’m really grateful for this. Thanks everyone." Rosberg stated he had no knowledge of his surroundings after his second pit stop as he was too focused on his horsepower disadvantage. His compatriot Vettel congratulated his teammate Ricciardo on winning and said it was "a very positive day". In the subsequent press conference, Ricciardo said he believed that more confidence and familiarity with the Formula One community helped him to win the Grand Prix. Rosberg said he had to cool his brakes after his kinetic motor–generator unit failed, "I lost a lot of power on the straights. At the same time, taking those things into consideration, I was just pushing flat out, qualifying laps, one after another and managing to stay ahead of that pack behind me until two laps from the end." Vettel said he felt Red Bull had been fortunate after several issues early in the season and finishing the race ahead one of the Mercedes, "I think that's a very, very positive day for us."

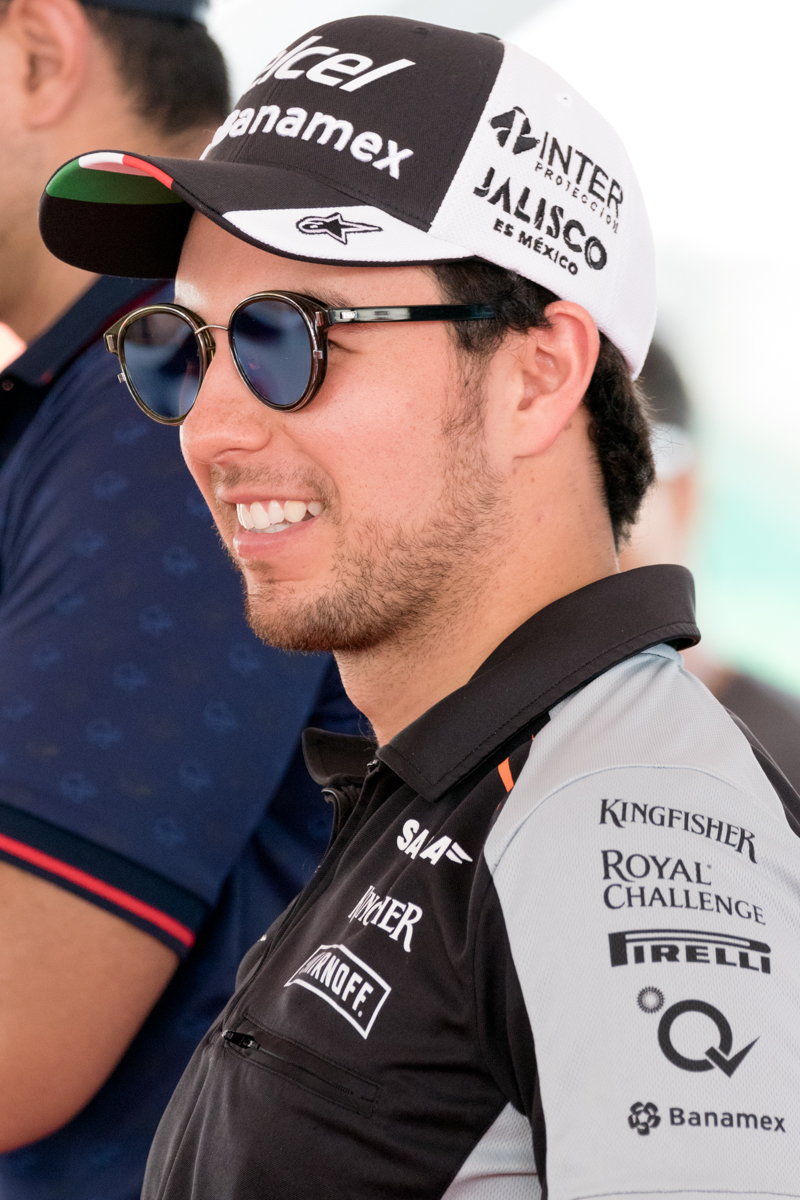
Sergio Pérez (pictured in 2016) was given a five-place grid penalty for the Austrian Grand Prix because he was deemed to have caused an accident with Felipe Massa on the final lap.

Pérez and Massa were unhurt and were transported to the circuit's medical centre. They were later airlifted to the Sacre Coeur hospital for a pre-cautionary check-up because their crashes registered enough of a G-force to activate their car's medical alarm. The collision was referred to the stewards and Pérez incurred a five place grid penalty for the season's next race in Austria because they deemed him to have made an illegal manoeuvre that caused the crash. At the medical centre, Massa told Pérez of his disappointment with his driving and added he "needs to learn". He criticised the stewards' penalty because of the severity of the accident that nearly saw him collect Vettel. Pérez said he maintained his braking sequence and line prior to the crash,

"There was plenty of space on the left of my car to attempt a clean overtake, and I cannot understand why he had to scrape by. I watched several replays of the incident and I can't help but notice how Felipe turns right just before he hits me. I can only think he must have changed his mind and wanted to rejoin the racing line. His misjudgment cost us a big amount of points".

The Force India team and its manager Andy Stevenson felt there was a conspiracy against them as one of the stewards was Pérez's former manager and IndyCar Series driver Adrián Fernández, who ended his partnership with Pérez in 2012. FIA Race Director Charlie Whiting dismissed the idea of a conspiracy as "nonsense". He commented Fernández would serve as the driver representative at the Russian Grand Prix. On 20 June, the stewards called a meeting to review driver testimony and telemetry from Pérez. The FIA elected to uphold the stewards' decision on the basis that there was no purpose on which to change it.

The stewards also reviewed the accident between Marussia teammates Chilton and Bianchi on the first lap. Chilton incurred a three-place grid penalty for the upcoming Austrian Grand Prix for being deemed at fault for the accident. Chilton said he believed Bianchi caused the crash by braking later than him on the outside. He believed additional television footage would have shown his teammate was responsible. Bianchi stated his belief he did not brake too late and had provided Chilton with space to drive past. Although the relationship between both drivers cooled, they spoke to each other on the morning of 19 June and they agreed to move on from the crash.

Rosberg, who drove onto the run-off area on lap 25, stated his belief that the regulations on minor driver errors needed to be clarified to stop automatic steward investigations on such incidents, "It is worth discussing, because it going to the stewards is a bit strange. It is something that we all agreed among ourselves, and especially that the first time you can maybe get a warning, but you cannot do it three times in a row." Sky Sports F1 pundits Johnny Herbert and Martin Brundle believed Rosberg was fortunate not to receive a penalty. Their colleague Damon Hill said a warning was justified. After his retirement from the race, Hamilton admitted he required a form similar to his four wins in a row earlier in the season to retake the lead in the Drivers' Championship, "It is going to take a lot, four wins. I just can't believe that my car stops and the other doesn't. Two DNFs is not easy but I have caught up before and I will catch up again."

Rosberg left Canada with an increased lead of 22 championship points over his teammate Hamilton in the World Drivers' Championship. Ricciardo's victory elevated him to third. Alonso's seventh-place finish dropped him to fourth. Vettel rounded out the top five. In the World Constructors' Championship, Mercedes maintained its lead with 258 championship points. Red Bull remained in second with 139 championship points. Ferrari's hold on third place was reduced by one championship point over Force India in fourth. McLaren drew closer to Force India by four points with 12 races remaining in the season.

=== Race classification ===
Drivers who scored championship points are denoted in bold.

Pos.	No.	Driver	Constructor	Laps	Time/Retired	Grid	Points
1	3	(Australia) **Daniel Ricciardo**	**Red Bull Racing-Renault**	70	1:39:12.830	6	25
2	6	(Germany) **Nico Rosberg**	**Mercedes**	70	+4.236	1	18
3	1	(Germany) **Sebastian Vettel**	**Red Bull Racing-Renault**	70	+5.247	3	15
4	22	(United Kingdom) **Jenson Button**	**McLaren-Mercedes**	70	+11.755	9	12
5	27	(Germany) **Nico Hülkenberg**	**Force India-Mercedes**	70	+12.843	11	10
6	14	(Spain) **Fernando Alonso**	**Ferrari**	70	+14.869	7	8
7	77	(Finland) **Valtteri Bottas**	**Williams-Mercedes**	70	+23.578	4	6
8	25	(France) **Jean-Éric Vergne**	**Toro Rosso-Renault**	70	+28.026	8	4
9	20	(Denmark) **Kevin Magnussen**	**McLaren-Mercedes**	70	+29.254	12	2
10	7	(Finland) **Kimi Räikkönen**	**Ferrari**	70	+53.678	10	1
11^{4}	11	(Mexico) Sergio Pérez	Force India-Mercedes	69	Collision	13	
12^{4}	19	(Brazil) Felipe Massa	Williams-Mercedes	69	Collision	5	
13	99	(Germany) Adrian Sutil	Sauber-Ferrari	69	+1 Lap	16	
14^{4}	21	(Mexico) Esteban Gutiérrez	Sauber-Ferrari	64	Electrical	PL	
Ret	8	(France) Romain Grosjean	Lotus-Renault	59	Rear wing	14	
Ret	26	(Russia) Daniil Kvyat	Toro Rosso-Renault	47	Engine	15	
Ret	44	(United Kingdom) Lewis Hamilton	Mercedes	46	Brakes	2	
Ret	10	(Japan) Kamui Kobayashi	Caterham-Renault	23	Suspension	21	
Ret	13	(Venezuela) Pastor Maldonado	Lotus-Renault	21	Engine	17	
Ret	9	(Sweden) Marcus Ericsson	Caterham-Renault	7	Turbocharger	20	
Ret	4	(United Kingdom) Max Chilton	Marussia-Ferrari	0	Collision	18	
Ret	17	(France) Jules Bianchi	Marussia-Ferrari	0	Collision	19	

Notes

- **^4** – Sergio Pérez, Felipe Massa and Esteban Gutiérrez were classified because the sporting regulations stipulated they had met the threshold of completing at least 90 per cent of the race distance.

== Championship standings after the race ==
Drivers' Championship standings

+/–	Pos.	Driver	Points
	1	(Germany) Nico Rosberg	140
	2	(United Kingdom) Lewis Hamilton	118
1	3	(Australia) Daniel Ricciardo	79
1	4	(Spain) Fernando Alonso	69
1	5	(Germany) Sebastian Vettel	60

Constructors' Championship standings

+/–	Pos.	Constructor	Points
	1	(Germany) Mercedes	258
	2	(Austria) Red Bull Racing-Renault	139
	3	(Italy) Ferrari	87
	4	Force India-Mercedes	77
	5	(United Kingdom) McLaren-Mercedes	66
Sources:

- Note: Only the top five positions are included for both sets of standings.

Previous race: 2014 Monaco Grand Prix	FIA Formula One World Championship; 2014 season	Next race: 2014 Austrian Grand Prix
Previous race: 2013 Canadian Grand Prix	Canadian Grand Prix	Next race: 2015 Canadian Grand Prix
