= 2014 Brazilian Grand Prix =

Race 18 of 19 in the 2014 Formula One World Championship
← Previous race	Next race →

Race details
- Date: 9 November 2014
- Official name: Formula 1 Grande Prêmio Petrobras do Brasil 2014
- Location: Autódromo José Carlos Pace, São Paulo, Brazil
- Course: Permanent racing facility
- Course length: 4.309 km (2.677 miles)
- Distance: 71 laps, 305.909 (Note: There is a 0.030 km (0.019 mi) offset between the start and finish lines.) km (190.083 miles)
- Weather: Sunny, Air: 23 to 24 °C (73 to 75 °F), Track: 46 to 50 °C (115 to 122 °F)

Pole position
Driver	(Germany) Nico Rosberg	Mercedes
- Time: 1:10.023

Fastest lap
Driver	(United Kingdom) Lewis Hamilton	Mercedes
- Time: 1:13.555 on lap 62

Podium
First	(Germany) Nico Rosberg	Mercedes
Second	(United Kingdom) Lewis Hamilton	Mercedes
Third	(Brazil) Felipe Massa	Williams-Mercedes

The 2014 Brazilian Grand Prix (formally the Formula 1 Grande Prêmio Petrobras do Brasil 2014) was a Formula One motor race held on 9 November at the Autódromo José Carlos Pace in São Paulo. It was the 18th and penultimate round of the 2014 Formula One World Championship and the 42nd Brazilian Grand Prix as part of the series. Mercedes driver Nico Rosberg won the 71-lap race from pole position. His teammate Lewis Hamilton finished second and local Williams driver Felipe Massa was third. It was Rosberg's fifth victory of the season and the eighth of his career.

Going into the race, Hamilton led the World Drivers' Championship from Rosberg while their team Mercedes had already won the World Constructors' Championship at the Russian Grand Prix. Rosberg won the pole position by setting the fastest lap in qualifying and maintained the lead until his first pit stop at the end of lap seven. Nico Hülkenberg led after Hamilton's lap eight pit stop and held it until Rosberg overtook him six laps later. Hamilton returned to the lead when Rosberg made a second pit stop 12 laps later but a spin at turn four during the extra lap he was on the track lost him the position. On blistered front tyres, Hamilton remained close by Rosberg by the time of the third cycle of pit stops but Rosberg held off his teammate to win the race.

The result allowed Rosberg to lower Hamilton's lead in the World Drivers' Championship to 17 championship points while Daniel Ricciardo secured third place despite retiring with a suspension issue. Sebastian Vettel and Fernando Alonso each gained one position to move into fourth and fifth places. Mercedes increased their unassailable lead in the World Constructors' Championship to 278 championship points over Red Bull Racing with one race left in the season.

== Background ==
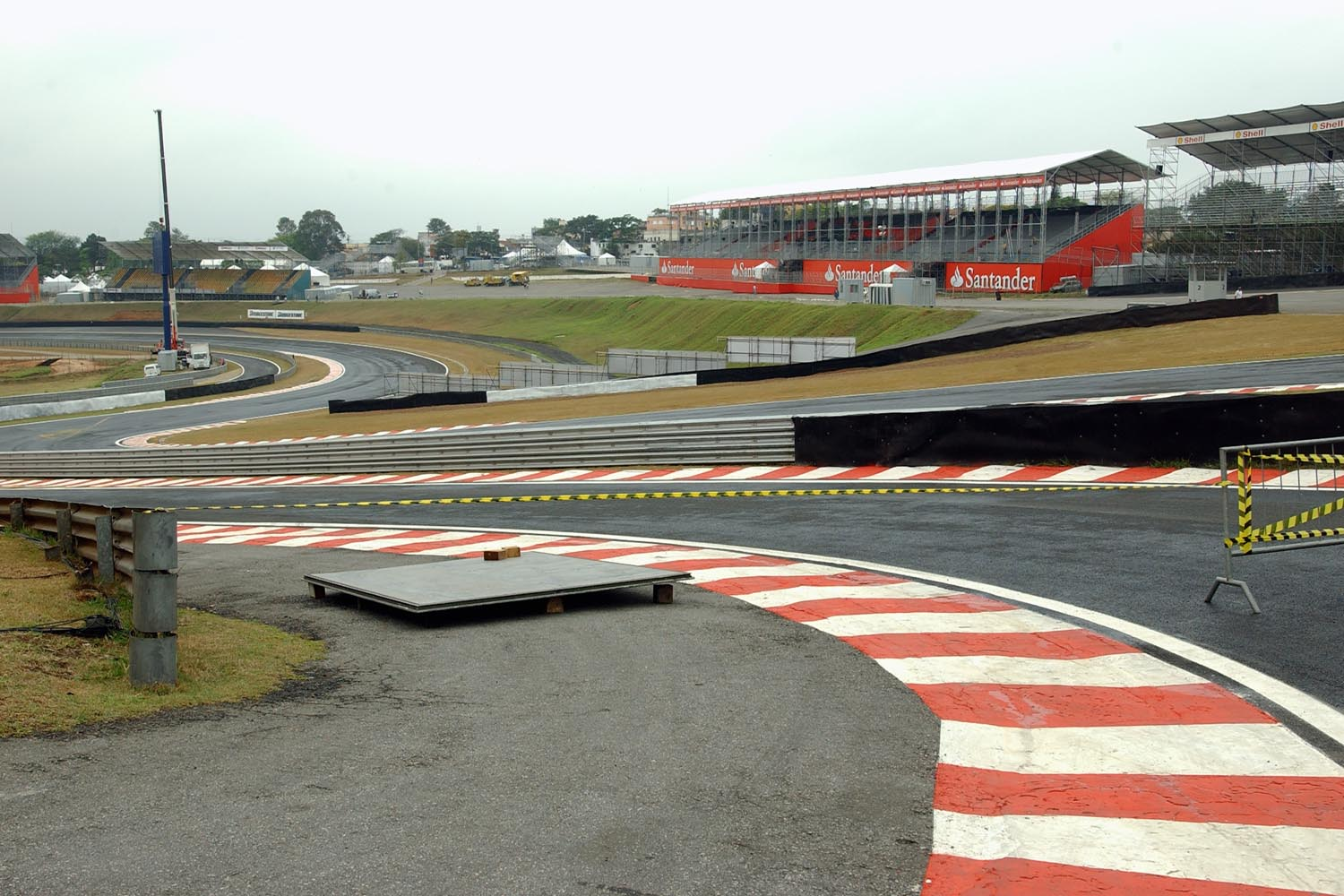
The Autódromo José Carlos Pace (pictured in 2006), where the race was held

The 2014 Brazilian Grand Prix was the 18th of the 19 rounds in the 2014 Formula One World Championship and the 42nd running of the event as part of the series. It was held on 9 November at the 4.309 km (2.677 mi) 15-turn Autódromo José Carlos Pace in São Paulo. As they were at the United States Grand Prix the week before, Formula One's commercial rights owner Bernie Ecclestone granted Caterham and Marussia dispensation to miss the race due to their ongoing financial struggles coupled with the high cost of travel to the western hemisphere and the one-week gap between the United States and Brazilian Grand Prix. The drag reduction system (DRS) had two activation zones for the race: one was on the straight linking turns three and four and the second was on the straight linking the final and first corners. The event's official name was the Formula 1 Grande Prêmio Petrobras do Brasil 2014.

Before the race, Mercedes driver Lewis Hamilton led the World Drivers' Championship with 316 championship points, 24 ahead of teammate Nico Rosberg in second and Daniel Ricciardo third. Valtteri Bottas was fourth with 155 championship points, six ahead of Sebastian Vettel in fifth. While the Drivers' Championship had not been won, Mercedes taken the World Constructors' Championship at the Russian Grand Prix. Red Bull ensured they would finish second, while Williams with 238 championship points were third, Ferrari with 196 were fourth and McLaren fifth. With the introduction of double points for the season-ending Abu Dhabi Grand Prix, the Drivers' Championship could not be won in Brazil as Hamilton winning and Rosberg scoring no championship points would keep Rosberg in mathematical contention by being 49 championship points behind Hamilton.

In mid-2014, the track was resurfaced in an effort to reduce its bumpiness and the pit lane was re-profiled with the entry brought forward off the racing line at the Arquibancadas corner and a chicane added to the pit lane to further slow cars following a series of accidents in national races. The pit lane exit was moved further away from the track to allow for a run-off area to the left of turn two. In addition, in response to Jules Bianchi's crash in the Japanese Grand Prix, procedures relating to the location of a tractor crane at the Senna "S" chicane were altered. Pirelli originally nominated the orange-banded Hard and white-banded Medium tyres, as it had done since 2012. However, following the Russian Grand Prix one month prior, many drivers criticised the low level of grip and wear shown on the new tarmac of the Sochi Autodrom. Since the Autódromo José Carlos Pace was completely repaved, there was concern that the hard compound would be "very dangerous". Along with unanimous agreement from all 11 teams, (Note: Caterham and Marussia's agreement was required, as they had not yet entered administration when the decision to switch tyre compounds was made.) Pirelli ultimately decided to bring the Medium and yellow-banded Soft tyres to Brazil.

During practice, the sport's governing body, the Fédération Internationale de l'Automobile (FIA) re-tested its Virtual Safety Car system, which was proposed for the 2015 season to better deal with race track emergencies, following the incident suffered by Bianchi in the Japanese Grand Prix. Changes made to this system, relative to the version first tested in the United States, satisfied the drivers. There were driver changes for the first practice session. Deutsche Tourenwagen Masters (DTM) racer Daniel Juncadella replaced Sergio Pérez at Force India for the third time in 2014, while GP2 Series competitor Felipe Nasr used Bottas's car, and the Formula Three European Championship third-place finisher Max Verstappen drove Jean-Éric Vergne's Toro Rosso car.

== Practice ==
There were three practice sessions—two 90-minute sessions on Friday and another one-hour session on Saturday—preceding Sunday's race. Rosberg was fastest in the first session, which took place in dry and warm weather, with a lap of 1:12.764 two-tenths of a second faster than teammate Hamilton in second. Daniil Kvyat, Fernando Alonso, Felipe Massa, Verstappen, Pastor Maldonado, Kimi Räikkönen, Kevin Magnussen and Ricciardo occupied positions three to ten. During the session, where drivers struggled with grip on the resurfaced track, Juncadella was under mental strain because of his competing in DTM with Mercedes-Benz and spun at turn six. He lost control of his car's rear, hitting the turn eight barrier, damaging his car's nose cone and suspension, and stopping the session. Force India replaced several engine hydraulic components following a heat soak and Pérez missed the second session. Jenson Button was unable to participate when he stopped at the pit lane entry with an energy recovery system failure. Esteban Gutiérrez was also not able to record a lap because of engine electrical issues.

In the second session, Rosberg recorded the day's fastest time of 1:12.123; teammate Hamilton, Räikkönen, Ricciardo, Bottas, Massa, Alonso, Kvyat, Vettel and Magnussen followed in the top ten. The session was disrupted three times: Vergne stopped on track at turn four when his engine suddenly lost power after 11 minutes. The second stoppage was caused by Alonso's engine catching fire and him stopping on the straight between turns three and four. He vacated his Ferrari to get a fire extinguisher to stop the blaze before marshals could reach his car. Gutiérrez caused the final stoppage when his car stopped with an energy recovery system failure with 13 minutes left. The final session was held in dry but overcast weather and saw Rosberg complete a free practice sweep with a lap of 1:10.446 on soft compound tyres. Hamilton was second-fastest and spun under braking for the Senna S chicane. Hamilton was later delayed by a Lotus car while on a fast lap. The Williams duo of Massa and Bottas were third and fourth; Ricciardo, Button, Räikkönen, Alonso, Magnussen and Kvyat completed the top ten.

== Qualifying ==
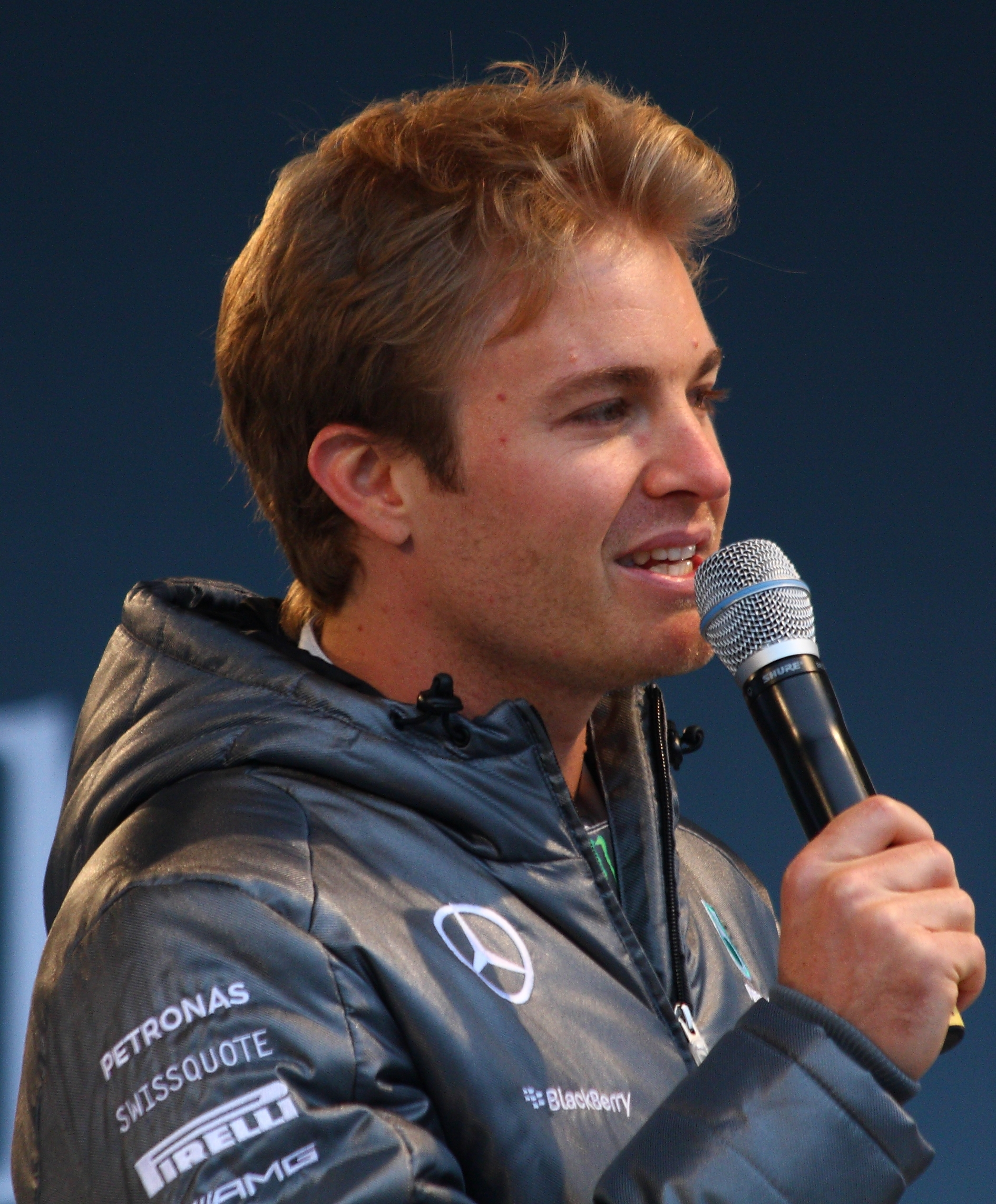
Nico Rosberg won the first FIA Pole Trophy after achieving pole position and overtook Rubens Barrichello's ten-year qualifying track record.

Saturday afternoon's qualifying session was divided into three parts. The first part ran for 18 minutes, eliminating cars that finished the session 15th or below. The 107% rule was in effect, requiring drivers to reach a time within 107 per cent of the quickest lap to qualify. The second part lasted 15 minutes, eliminating cars in 11th to 14th. The final 12-minute session determined pole position to tenth. Cars who progressed to the final session were not allowed to change tyres for the race's start, using the tyres with which they set their quickest lap times in the second session. Rosberg was fastest in all three sessions, taking his tenth pole position of the season, and the 14th of his career, with a time of 1:10.023, breaking Rubens Barrichello's 2004 pole lap record by six-tenths of a second. He won the first FIA Pole Trophy as Hamilton could not overtake his poles total with one race left. He was joined on the grid's front row by Hamilton who lost time entering turn ten too fast, causing him to lose control of the rear of his car. Massa qualified third; traffic slowed his final timed lap and he locked his tyres at the Senna S chicane. Fuel pressure problems shut down Massa's engine. Bottas in fourth aborted his final lap after locking his tyres three times.

Button and Vettel took fifth and sixth. Button's fastest timed lap was his first but he failed to improve on his second. It allowed Vettel to challenge him but was 0.080 seconds slower than Button on his second timed lap. Magnussen in seventh did not feel the soft tyres helped him and was unable to go faster. The Ferrari duo of Alonso and Räikkönen were eighth and tenth; Ricciardo separated them, believing minor pre-qualifying fine-tuning adjustments to his car affected its balance. Gutiérrez, considered as "one of the standout performers" of qualifying, was the fastest driver not to qualify for the final session. Nico Hülkenberg had difficulty finding a rhythm and took 12th, ahead of Adrian Sutil's slower Sauber car. Kvyat qualified 14th after electing not to record a lap in the second session and was demoted ten places on the grid for carrying over an engine penalty from the United States Grand Prix. Hence, Romain Grosjean inherited the position, after Lotus made overnight adjustments to his car. Vergne had difficulty in driving and an incorrect set-up left him in 15th. Pérez originally took 16th but a seven-place grid penalty was applied after he was deemed to have caused an avoidable accident with Sutil in the United States and Maldonado inherited the place.

=== Qualifying classification ===
The fastest lap in each of the three sessions is denoted in bold.

Pos.	No.	Driver	Constructor	Q1	Q2	Q3	Grid
1	6	(Germany) Nico Rosberg	Mercedes	**1:10.347**	**1:10.303**	**1:10.023**	1
2	44	(United Kingdom) Lewis Hamilton	Mercedes	1:10.457	1:10.712	1:10.056	2
3	19	(Brazil) Felipe Massa	Williams-Mercedes	1:10.602	1:10.343	1:10.247	3
4	77	(Finland) Valtteri Bottas	Williams-Mercedes	1:10.832	1:10.421	1:10.305	4
5	22	(United Kingdom) Jenson Button	McLaren-Mercedes	1:11.097	1:11.127	1:10.930	5
6	1	(Germany) Sebastian Vettel	Red Bull Racing-Renault	1:11.880	1:11.129	1:10.938	6
7	20	(Denmark) Kevin Magnussen	McLaren-Mercedes	1:11.134	1:11.211	1:10.969	7
8	14	(Spain) Fernando Alonso	Ferrari	1:11.558	1:11.215	1:10.977	8
9	3	(Australia) Daniel Ricciardo	Red Bull Racing-Renault	1:11.593	1:11.208	1:11.075	9
10	7	(Finland) Kimi Räikkönen	Ferrari	1:11.193	1:11.188	1:11.099	10
11	21	(Mexico) Esteban Gutiérrez	Sauber-Ferrari	1:11.520	1:11.591	N/A	11
12	27	(Germany) Nico Hülkenberg	Force India-Mercedes	1:11.848	1:11.976	N/A	12
13	99	(Germany) Adrian Sutil	Sauber-Ferrari	1:11.943	1:12.099	N/A	13
14	26	(Russia) Daniil Kvyat	Toro Rosso-Renault	1:11.423	No Time	N/A	17^{1}
15	8	(France) Romain Grosjean	Lotus-Renault	1:12.037	N/A	N/A	14
16	25	(France) Jean-Éric Vergne	Toro Rosso-Renault	1:12.040	N/A	N/A	15
17	11	(Mexico) Sergio Pérez	Force India-Mercedes	1:12.076	N/A	N/A	18^{2}
18	13	(Venezuela) Pastor Maldonado	Lotus-Renault	1:12.233	N/A	N/A	16
107% time: 1:15.271

Notes:

- **^1** – Daniil Kvyat received a seven-place grid penalty to complete the ten-place penalty that he received at the previous race.
- **^2** – Sergio Pérez received a seven-place grid penalty for causing an avoidable accident in the previous race.

== Race ==
The race began at 14:00 Brasilia Time (UTC−02:00). The weather at the start was dry and sunny with an air temperature between 23 and 24 °C (73 and 75 °F) and a track temperature ranging from 46 to 50 °C (115 to 122 °F); forecasts of rain for Sunday did not materialise. Sutil started from the pit lane after his mechanics reconfigured his car's cooling system. The first ten starters began on the soft compound tyres with four on the medium tyres. When the race began, Rosberg maintained the lead at the Senna S chicane as Bottas was slow but returned to fourth place. Heading into the Curva do Sol turn, Vettel over-committed in the braking zone and ran wide while defending from Magnussen. By doing so, Magnussen and Alonso demoted Vettel to eighth behind teammate Ricciardo. Kvyat moved from 17th to 13th by the end of the first lap, while Sutil lost five positions over the same distance. At the end of the first lap, Rosberg led Hamilton by 0.8 seconds, who was followed in turn by, Massa, Bottas, Button, Magnussen, Alonso, Ricciardo and Gutiérrez.

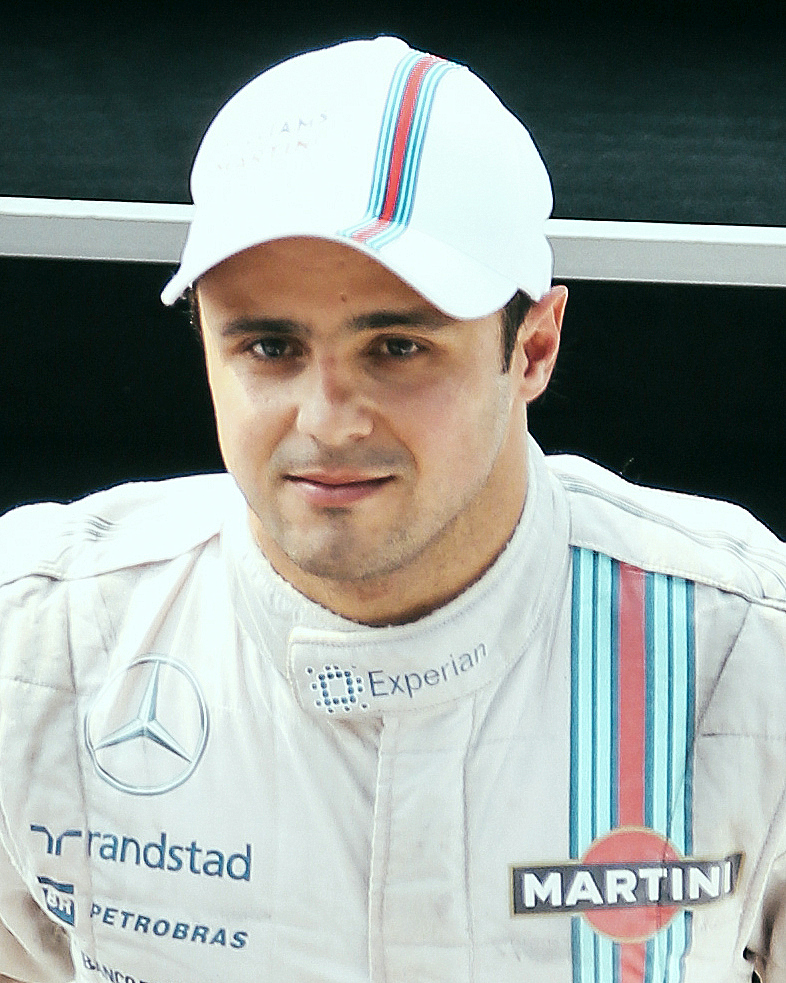
Felipe Massa finished third after a five-second time penalty for speeding in the pit lane.

Rosberg began to pull away from Hamilton, opening up a 1.2-second lead over his teammate while Massa was a further one second behind Hamilton. Ricciardo attempted to pass Vettel into the Senna S chicane on the start of the third lap but was not close enough to overtake. Massa was the first driver to have severe blistering on the soft compound tyres and was the first of the leading drivers to make a pit stop at the end of lap five for the change to the medium compound tyres, with Vettel, Bottas and Button making similar stops on the following lap. Rosberg held a one-second lead over Hamilton and made his first pit stop from the lead at the end of lap seven. Hamilton was more conservative on his tyres and went half a second faster in clear air. Massa was imposed a five-second penalty for speeding in the pit lane, and Hamilton made his pit stop from the lead at the conclusion of lap eight and came out narrowly behind teammate Rosberg.

With Hamilton's and Rosberg's pit stops completed, Hülkenberg and Kvyat were first and second, followed by Grosjean. Traffic slowed Rosberg, allowing Hamilton to potentially attack his teammate. Rosberg was protected from Hamilton overtaking on the main straight because he used DRS to defend himself since he was close behind Grosjean. He drew nearer to Kvyat and passed him for second on lap 12. On the same lap, Button overtook Sutil for eighth place. Mercedes instructed Hamilton to manage his right-rear tyre temperatures and lost more time to Rosberg by following Kvyat, who allowed Hamilton past before the Senna S chicane just as Hülkenberg had Rosberg close behind. Hülkenberg reported a blistered front-right tyre to Force India and Rosberg overtook him for the lead into the Senna S chicane at the start of lap 14. Massa passed Grosjean and Bottas overtook Grosjean at the Senna S chicane for sixth place on lap 15. With his front tyres blistered, Hamilton used DRS to pass Hülkenberg into the Senna S chicane on the following lap.

Massa drew closer to Kvyat and passed him into the Senna chicane for fourth place on lap 17 as Alonso overtook Sutil at the same turn for tenth on that lap. At the same time, Hülkenberg made his pit stop and rejoined the track in 15th. Hamilton's right-front tyre was blistered but was not significantly hindered and set a new fastest lap to be 2.1 seconds behind Rosberg at the start of lap 20, after Rosberg became aware of not over stressing his tyres and Hamilton being faster. The two drivers pulled away from Massa. Button drove close behind Bottas and used his DRS to pull away from Magnussen, Vettel, Alonso and Ricciardo. Magnussen steered left to pass Grosjean for sixth on lap 23. Alonso attempted to pass Grosjean on the outside into the Senna chicane on the next lap but Grosjean blocked him. Alonso tried again on the main straight and overtook Grosjean before the Descida do Lago turn for seventh. Vettel also passed Grojean at the same turn. Massa served his penalty on the 26th lap, and after taking it, had new tyres installed on his car.

Rosberg made his second pit stop on the same lap, returning the lead to Hamilton. Bottas also made a pit stop but a delay in fitting his unbuckled seat belt and adjusting it, allowed Button into fourth as Bottas fell to 12th. Hamilton drove faster than any driver to try and take the lead after his pit stop. Mercedes asked Hamilton on lap 28 to make an energy recovery switch to raise the harvesting rate but not a forward brake bias adjustment. When Hamilton braked for the Descida do Lado turn, his rear tyre locked, oversteered and spun onto the run-off area. Hamilton rejoined the track seven seconds later. Hamilton made his pit stop on that lap and emerged in second, 7.4 seconds behind teammate Rosberg. Button closed up to Kvyat and waited until the main straight to pass with DRS into the Senna chicane on lap 30. Hamilton moved to within five seconds of his teammate Rosberg on blistered rear tyres by lap 35. Räikkönen made a pit stop from third on the same lap but lost time after the front jack was lowered before his right-front tyre was installed. He rejoined the track in 13th, behind Grosjean.

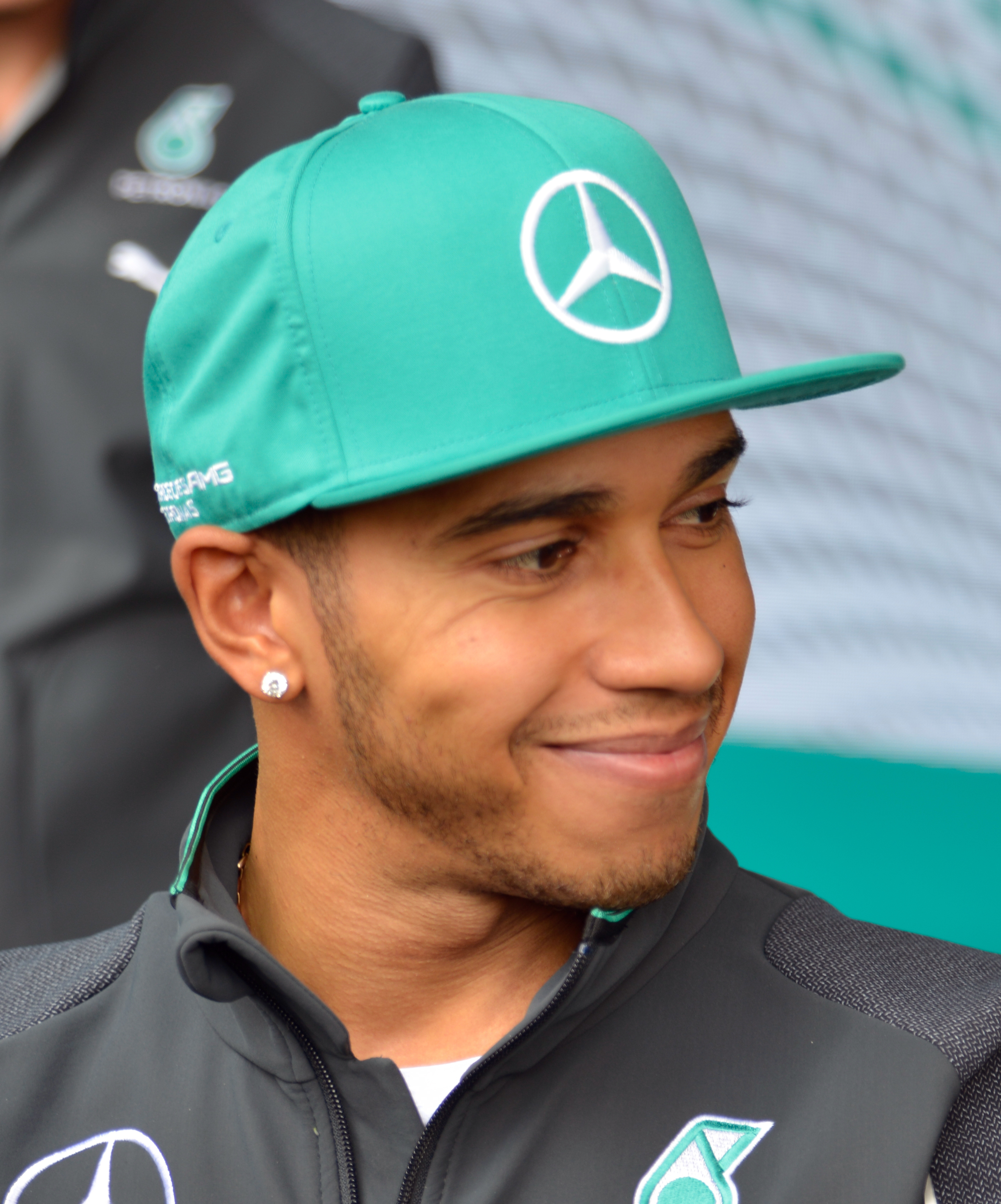
Lewis Hamilton finished second to allow the title to be decided at the season-ending Abu Dhabi Grand Prix.

Vettel overtook Kvyat at the Senna chicane for fifth on lap 37. Ricciardo's front-left suspension began to move unsteadily on the main straight on lap 39, and veered right into the Senna chicane. Ricciardo entered the pit lane to retire, ending a 15-race finishing streak extending back to the Malaysian Grand Prix. Hülkenberg passed Bottas for eighth by putting him onto the run-off area at the Senna chicane on lap 42. Bottas defended from Räikkönen on the outside at Descida do Lago turn before going wide on the exit. Bottas had a problematic pit stop on lap 44: one of his mechanics struggled to adjust the front wing and Bottas fell to 16th. Magnussen had worse tyre degradation than his teammate Button and Alonso could not pass Button on the outside into the Senna S chicane on lap 45. The battle continued through the following corners but Button's defence into Descida do Lago turn compromised his exit and Alonso overtook him on the inside of turn five.

Hamilton closed up to Rosberg by 1.9 seconds by the start of lap 50. Rosberg made his final pit stop from the lead that same lap. Slower traffic delayed Hamilton, who rejoined just behind his teammate after his own pit stop. Massa and Button made pit stops on that lap and they exited the pit lane in fifth and sixth, respectively. Button had closed up to Massa after the latter drove onto the incorrect pit box. Hülkenberg moved to third but Massa passed him into the Senna chicane on lap 54. Hamilton attacked Rosberg, who responded by going faster than his teammate but Hamilton stayed close by with DRS on the straights. The duo pulled away from Massa and Räikkönen. Slower traffic did not affect Rosberg and Hamilton enough to be slowed. On lap 61, Räikkönen—on 25-lap worn tyres—blocked a pass by Button for fourth into the Senna chicane. Button held the racing line and drew alongside Räikkönen on the back straight before passing on the outside at the Descida do Lago turn. Räikkönen lost momentum at the corner and Vettel passed him. Alonso began to battle teammate Räikkönen who defended over the next few laps.

Grosjean stopped on track near a fire marshal with smoke billowing from his engine on lap 65 and retired from the race. Hülkenberg passed Magnussen for eighth on lap 68, while Räikkönen lost traction in his tyres at the bottom of the hill at the Senna S chicane, allowing teammate Alonso into sixth on the same lap. Hamilton moved to within 0.8 seconds of his teammate Rosberg at the start of the final lap, but Hamilton could not get close enough to pass Rosberg, who took his fifth victory of the season and the eighth of his career. Massa finished third, with Button fourth, Vettel fifth, Alonso sixth from teammate Räikkönen, Hülkenberg eighth, and Magnussen ninth. Bottas held off Kvyat in the final laps to claim tenth. Maldonado, Vergne, Gutiérrez, Pérez and Sutil were the final finishers. Mercedes took their 11th one-two finish of the season, breaking McLaren's 1988 record with Alain Prost and Ayrton Senna. It was also the team's 15th victory of 2014, equalling McLaren and Ferrari's joint record. There were seven lead changes in the race: three drivers reached the front of the field. Rosberg led four times for a total of 59 laps, more than any other driver.

=== Post-race ===
At the podium interviews, conducted by three-time World Champion Nelson Piquet, Rosberg declared his happiness over the weekend sweep, having been able to feel comfortable to attack in his Mercedes. Hamilton said despite his turn four spin, it had been "an amazing race" and praised his team for the work they put in and enjoyed his battle with Rosberg. Massa said he was "grateful" for his fast car. In the later press conference, Rosberg said it was important for him to improve after the United States, and was confident that he could control the gap to Hamilton and ensure he did not battle for the win. When asked if his spin prevented him from winning the race, Hamilton said he felt it did and admitted his error. He said he felt the team's record-breaking race was "absolutely incredible" and called it an "unbelievable job" by Mercedes. Massa said he thought his chances of a podium finish were diminished with his five-second time penalty but was unworried about parking in the wrong pit stall.

Vettel explained his poor start triggered memories of his first lap collision with Bruno Senna in 2012, saying he felt Red Bull would be stronger against McLaren at the start but that it was highly competitive and was hoping to possibly finish in a higher position. Williams' Head of Vehicle Performance Rob Smedley was angry with himself for not stopping Massa driving through the McLaren pit stall after the team switched garage positions for the race and exchanged words afterwards. He felt it should have been given more consideration and given advance warning. However he praised Bottas for scoring an extra championship point and described the Williams team's race as a "character building" event, something he was taught at Ferrari by technical director Ross Brawn. Bottas said he had severe left-rear tyre graining on his final stint, causing him to slide massively and lose positions: "I was managing a lot at the beginning and then could just avoid [Daniil] Kvyat from overtaking. At one point there was some debris in the rear wing [as well], a tear off or something. [As I said] it was just not my day."

Following Button's fourth-place finish, which was the fifth time in 2014 he achieved a top four finish, he said he did not compete to attempt to prove anything but was in the sport "to do my job and my job is to do the best job I can for myself and for the team and that's exactly what I did." However, he was delighted to duel the Williams team, saying, "It was a lot of fun. And then the battle with Kimi Raikkonen, going past him was mega – I really enjoyed that. We're not the best of friends but we battle hard but clean." Alonso was not frustrated with his teammate Räikkönen over their late-race battle for sixth: "The most important thing was not the battle with him, it was the battle with the other teams and we got some good points for Ferrari today. Even if I could have overtaken Kimi a little quicker I had to save a lot of fuel in the last couple of laps so a battle with Sebastian was never a possibility." Räikkönen dismissed the battle as "normal racing" and felt it had not hindered his team because it would score the same number of championship points regardless of his finishing position.

The press praised Rosberg. Andrew Benson of BBC Sport said his weekend was "copybook" and it was needed to "re-establish his position as a credible championship contender" to many people. L'Équipe said Rosberg "demonstrated above all that he knew how to let the past, and his recent disappointments, behind him. He is psychologically ready to face his rival and lead the hard life until the last round of the last Grand Prix." The Daily Telegraph's Formula One correspondent Daniel Johnson described Rosberg's performance as "the race of his life under relentless pressure" and called his victory "the finest of his career." Writing for The Independent, David Tremayne wrote Rosberg had "finally avenged himself" on teammate Hamilton by winning and gave him realistic title chances by proving he could resist pressure.

The result reduced Hamilton's World Drivers' Championship lead over Rosberg by seven championship points to 17. Despite his retirement, Ricciardo had secured third place as no other driver could overtake his championship points total with one race remaining. Vettel moved to fourth with 159 championship points, two ahead of fifth-placed Alonso. Mercedes further extended their unassailable lead in the World Constructors' Championship to 278 championship points over Red Bull. Williams and Ferrari remained in third and fourth with 254 and 210 championship points and McLaren were fifth on 161 championship points with one race left in the season. Despite his lead, Hamilton said he would take "zero comfort" for the season's final race: "There are 50 points to gain. The last race, you never know whats going to happen, so I'm going there to win."

=== Race classification ===
Drivers who scored championship points are denoted in bold.

Pos.	No.	Driver	Constructor	Laps	Time/Retired	Grid	Points
1	6	**(Germany) Nico Rosberg**	**Mercedes**	71	1:30:02.555	1	25
2	44	**(United Kingdom) Lewis Hamilton**	**Mercedes**	71	+1.457	2	18
3	19	**(Brazil) Felipe Massa**	**Williams-Mercedes**	71	+41.031	3	15
4	22	**(United Kingdom) Jenson Button**	**McLaren-Mercedes**	71	+48.658	5	12
5	1	**(Germany) Sebastian Vettel**	**Red Bull Racing-Renault**	71	+51.420	6	10
6	14	**(Spain) Fernando Alonso**	**Ferrari**	71	+1:01.906	8	8
7	7	**(Finland) Kimi Räikkönen**	**Ferrari**	71	+1:03.730	10	6
8	27	**(Germany) Nico Hülkenberg**	**Force India-Mercedes**	71	+1:03.934	12	4
9	20	**(Denmark) Kevin Magnussen**	**McLaren-Mercedes**	71	+1:10.085	7	2
10	77	**(Finland) Valtteri Bottas**	**Williams-Mercedes**	70	+1 Lap	4	1
11	26	(Russia) Daniil Kvyat	Toro Rosso-Renault	70	+1 Lap	17	
12	13	(Venezuela) Pastor Maldonado	Lotus-Renault	70	+1 Lap	16	
13	25	(France) Jean-Éric Vergne	Toro Rosso-Renault	70	+1 Lap	15	
14	21	(Mexico) Esteban Gutiérrez	Sauber-Ferrari	70	+1 Lap	11	
15	11	(Mexico) Sergio Pérez	Force India-Mercedes	70	+1 Lap	18	
16	99	(Germany) Adrian Sutil	Sauber-Ferrari	70	+1 Lap	13	
17	8	(France) Romain Grosjean	Lotus-Renault	63	Power unit	14	
Ret	3	(Australia) Daniel Ricciardo	Red Bull Racing-Renault	39	Suspension	9	

== Championship standings after the race ==
Drivers' Championship standings

+/–	Pos.	Driver	Points
	1	(United Kingdom) **Lewis Hamilton***	334
	2	(Germany) **Nico Rosberg***	317
	3	(Australia) Daniel Ricciardo	214
1	4	(Germany) Sebastian Vettel	159
1	5	(Spain) Fernando Alonso	157

Constructors' Championship standings

+/–	Pos.	Constructor	Points
	1	(Germany) **Mercedes**	651
	2	(Austria) Red Bull Racing-Renault	373
	3	(United Kingdom) Williams-Mercedes	254
	4	(Italy) Ferrari	210
	5	(United Kingdom) McLaren-Mercedes	161
Sources:

- Note: Only the top five positions are included for both sets of standings.
- **Bold text** indicates 2014 World Constructors' Champions.
- **Bold text** and an asterisk indicates competitors who still had a theoretical chance of becoming World Champion.

== Explanatory notes and references ==
=== References ===
Previous race: 2014 United States Grand Prix	FIA Formula One World Championship; 2014 season	Next race: 2014 Abu Dhabi Grand Prix
Previous race: 2013 Brazilian Grand Prix	Brazilian Grand Prix	Next race: 2015 Brazilian Grand Prix
