= 2014 United States Grand Prix =

Race 17 of 19 in the 2014 Formula One World Championship
← Previous race	Next race →
- Layout of the Circuit of the Americas

Race details
- Date: November 2, 2014
- Official name: 2014 Formula 1 United States Grand Prix
- Location: Circuit of the Americas, Travis County, Austin, Texas
- Course: Permanent racing facility
- Course length: 5.513 km (3.426 miles)
- Distance: 56 laps, 308.405 (Note: There is a 0.323 km (0.201 mi) offset between the start and finish lines.) km (191.634 miles)
- Weather: Sunny
- Attendance: 107,778

Pole position
Driver	(Germany) Nico Rosberg	Mercedes
- Time: 1:36.067

Fastest lap
Driver	(Germany) Sebastian Vettel	Red Bull Racing-Renault
- Time: 1:41.379 on lap 50

Podium
First	(United Kingdom) Lewis Hamilton	Mercedes
Second	(Germany) Nico Rosberg	Mercedes
Third	(Australia) Daniel Ricciardo	Red Bull Racing-Renault

The 2014 United States Grand Prix (formally the 2014 Formula 1 United States Grand Prix) was a Formula One motor race held on November 2, 2014, at the Circuit of the Americas in Travis County near Austin, Texas. It was the 17th round of the 2014 Formula One World Championship and the 36th United States Grand Prix held as part of the series. Mercedes driver Lewis Hamilton won the 56-lap race starting from second position. His teammate Nico Rosberg finished second and Red Bull driver Daniel Ricciardo was third. It was Hamilton's tenth victory of the season and the 32nd of his career.

Heading into the race, Hamilton led the World Drivers' Championship from Rosberg while their team Mercedes had already won the World Constructors' Championship at the preceding Russian Grand Prix. Rosberg won the pole position by recording the fastest lap in the third qualifying session and kept the lead on the first lap. The race was neutralised by a four-lap safety car period when Sergio Pérez, Adrian Sutil and Kimi Räikkönen made contact. During the first half of the race, Hamilton ran close behind teammate Rosberg to conserve fuel but braked heavily through parts of the track to prevent brake glazing. After the two Mercedes cars made their pit stops for new tyres, Hamilton passed his teammate Rosberg for the lead on lap 24, and pulled away to achieve victory and overtake Nigel Mansell for the most wins by a British driver in Formula One.

In the week before the event, the Caterham and Marussia teams went into administration and were granted dispensation to miss the race, leaving the sport with nine entered teams, the lowest number since the 2005 Monaco Grand Prix. Hamilton's victory, his fifth in a row, moved him further clear from Rosberg atop the World Drivers' Championship, as Ricciardo's third-place finish eliminated him from title contention. Valtteri Bottas moved further ahead of Sebastian Vettel in fifth. Mercedes increased their unassailable lead in the World Constructors' Championship to 245 championship points over Red Bull while Williams moved further away from Ferrari in fourth with two races left in the season.

== Background ==
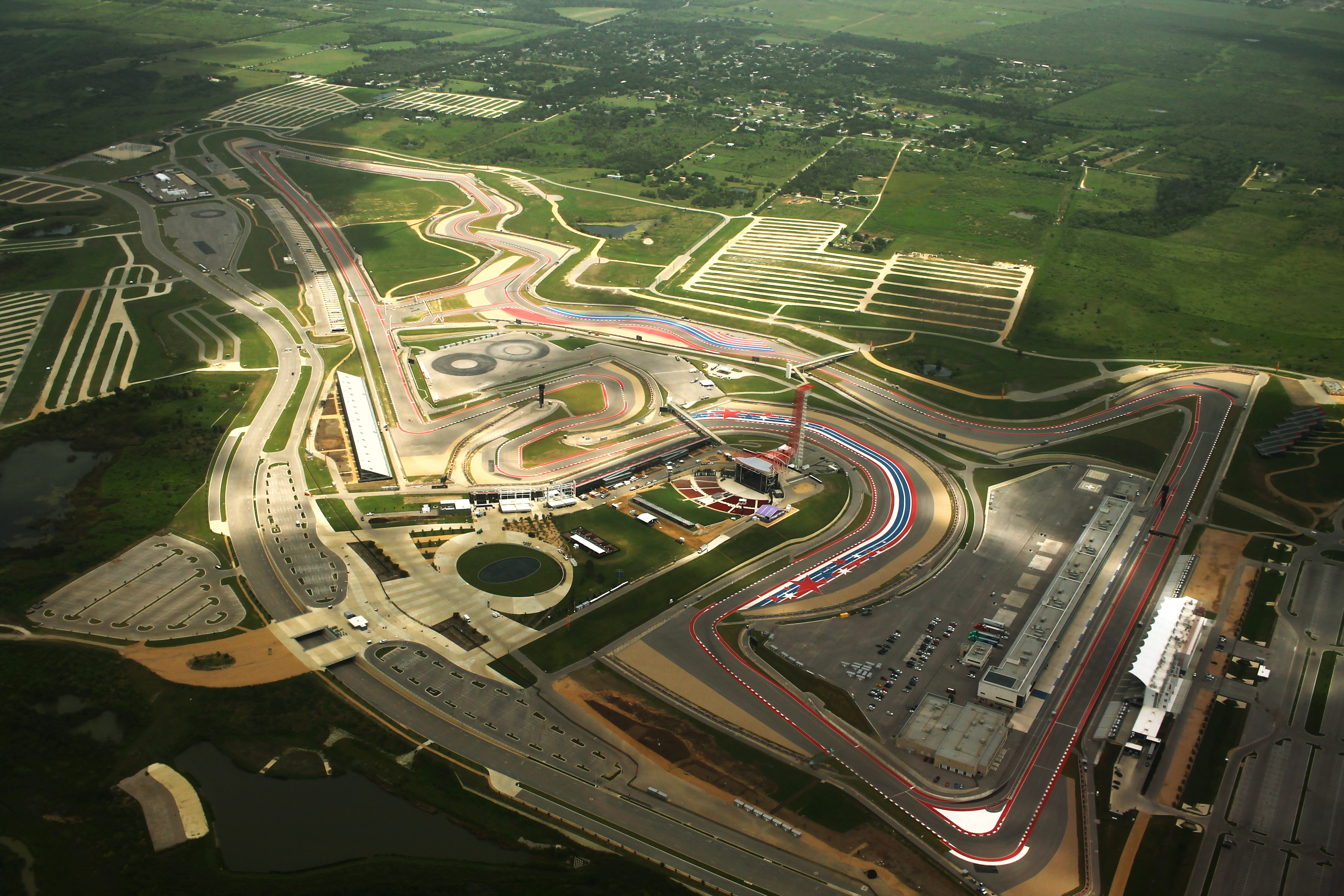
The Circuit of the Americas (pictured in 2015), where the race was held.

The 2014 United States Grand Prix was the 17th of the 19 rounds of the 2014 Formula One World Championship, and the 36th running of the event in Formula One. It was held on 2 November at the 5.513-kilometre (3.426 mi) 20-turn Circuit of the Americas in Travis County, Austin, Texas. (Note: The race was provisionally scheduled for 9 November, however, the date coincided with a University of Texas American football team game, which would have strained Austin's tourism infrastructure.) The sport's governing body, the Fédération Internationale de l'Automobile (FIA), elected to retain two drag reduction system (DRS) activation zones from 2013: one was on the straight between turns 10 and 11, and the second was on the straight linking the final and first corners.

The circuit was changed following the 2013 race. At the request of motorcycling's governing body, the Fédération Internationale de Motocyclisme, some sections of turn ten's asphalt run-off area were replaced by gravel and some light panels were mounted closer to the ground for better visibility. Tyre supplier Pirelli brought the yellow-banded soft and white-banded medium dry compound tyres to the race, as opposed to the Hard and Medium tyres in 2012 and 2013. The event's official name was the 2014 Formula 1 United States Grand Prix.

Before the race, Mercedes driver Lewis Hamilton led the World Drivers' Championship with 291 championship points, ahead of teammate Nico Rosberg in second and Daniel Ricciardo third. Valtteri Bottas was fourth with 145 championship points, with Sebastian Vettel two championship points behind in fifth. While the Drivers' Championship had not been won, Mercedes had taken the World Constructors' Championship in the preceding Russian Grand Prix. Red Bull were in second place on 342 championship points; Williams (216 championship points) and Ferrari (188) were third and fourth and McLaren were fifth with 143 championship points.

After spending most of the season behind Rosberg, Hamilton had won the previous four races, converting a 29-point deficit into a 17-point lead over his teammate. With three races left, Hamilton said he would prioritise not allowing any negative thoughts consume him and would take any opportunities presented to him: "We've just got to do our due diligence and work as hard as we can to make sure we don't have any problems." Hamilton hoped to achieve his fifth consecutive victory of the year: "A lot of the American side of my family come to the race, plus I won the first F1 GP at the circuit back in 2012 – it's a special one for me. I really enjoy going there and I'm looking forward to another great race." Rosberg aimed to improve on his best finish in Austin and lower Hamilton's championship points lead. He said Mercedes targeted "a big finish" to the season, declaring he would not concede defeat until the final round, and hoped to maintain the level of entertainment for the fan base.

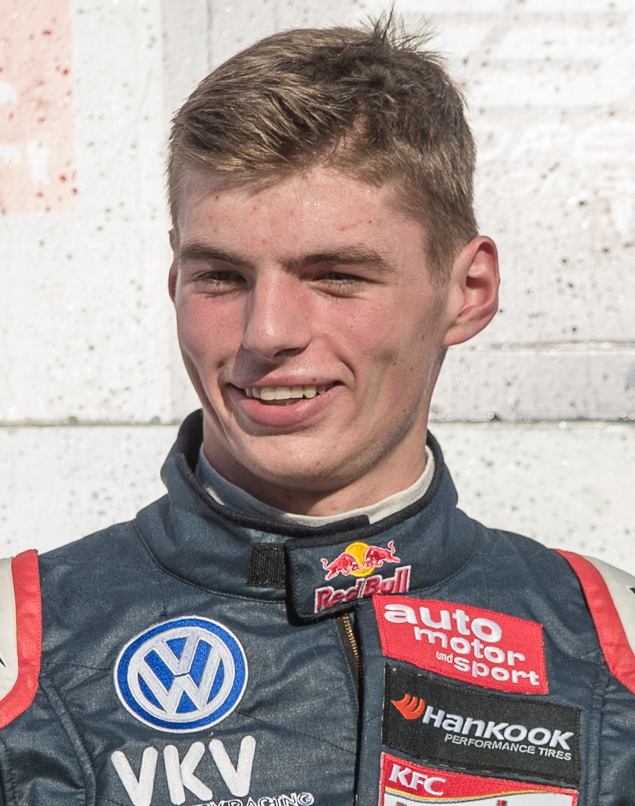
Max Verstappen replaced Jean-Éric Vergne for the first free practice session for the second time in 2014.

After both Friday practice sessions, the FIA tested for the first time a new system called the virtual safety car, which is in response to minimising the risk of serious accidents and injuries, such as those suffered by Jules Bianchi at the Japanese Grand Prix. Its aim is to force drivers to slow by about 35 per cent in an accident zone, with the aid of a dashboard display. Drivers agreed it was a worthwhile system that, however, required refinement for further testing at subsequent races before it was introduced for the 2015 season. Caterham and Marussia were each granted permission by Formula One's commercial rights owner Bernie Ecclestone to miss the race due to their long-term financial problems and entering administration. With 18 entered vehicles, this was the smallest field entered into a Formula One race since the 2005 Monaco Grand Prix. There were driver changes for the first free practice session. European Formula Three Championship third-place finisher Max Verstappen replaced Jean-Éric Vergne at Toro Rosso for the second time in 2014, and Williams reserve driver Felipe Nasr drove Bottas's car.

The press reported that the Sauber, Lotus and Force India teams had considered withdrawing from the race to signal to Formula One's commercial leaders about its financial state following Caterham and Marussia's non-participation in the race. Ecclestone said if two of those squads left the series then "that is what will happen" and teams should only participate if they were competitive. Force India team principal Bob Fernley stated discussions about a boycott were as a final recourse. Lotus owner Gérard López said he had not heard about the proposed boycott and the team insisted that they would race. Vijay Mallya, the owner of Force India, severely criticised suggestions of a boycott six days after the race: "Who said that we wanted to boycott the race? Please tell me. If I am wrong, you educate me. I speak on behalf of Force India. I have never said that we are going to boycott, and I have clarified this in Austin. Why would we? We have come to go racing." (Note: It was noted by several publications that a boycott would have been similar to the 2005 United States Grand Prix at Indianapolis Motor Speedway where six drivers took part after cars equipped with Michelin tyres withdrew on safety grounds and would reverse the positive reputation the sport had established in the country along with further damaging relations with the low-budget teams.)

== Practice ==
Per the regulations for the 2014 season, three practice sessions were held, two 90-minute sessions on Friday and another 60-minute session on Saturday. Hamilton lapped fastest in the first practice session—which took place on a damp track that later dried—at 1:39.941; his session 18 minutes ended early due to a gear shift problem. His teammate Rosberg, Jenson Button, Daniil Kvyat, Kevin Magnussen, Fernando Alonso, Vettel, Nasr, Nico Hülkenberg and Verstappen occupied positions two to ten. Ricciardo was only able to drive the first 45 minutes because his energy recovery system failed and was restricted to five timed laps.

In the second session, where it was difficult for teams to alter their car's race set-ups because of strong crosswinds, Hamilton set the day's fastest lap at 1:39.085 on super-soft compound tyres; Rosberg was three-thousands of a second slower in second and had the fastest time until Hamilton's lap. Both Mercedes cars had reliability concerns with Hamilton reporting another gearbox problem and his session ended early with a minor hydraulic issue. Rosberg had a downshifting concern which he attributed to hitting the clutch pedal after lifting his leg. Alonso was third-fastest, followed by Ricciardo, Felipe Massa—who locked his brakes lightly and later spun his car—and Kimi Räikkönen. Kvyat, Magnussen, Button and Hülkenberg followed in the top ten. Romain Grosjean and his teammate Pastor Maldonado both lost control of their tight-handling Lotus cars and drove onto the run-off area several times.

Hamilton was fastest in the third session, which was held in chilly but bright weather, with a time of 1:37.107; Rosberg had a brake issue until the final minutes and went faster in the first two-thirds of the lap but an untidy final third of the lap caused by a glazed left rear brake disc only allowed him to go quicker by one-thousands of a second and placed second. Massa, Bottas, Alonso, Ricciardo, Hülkenberg, Adrian Sutil, Räikkönen and Button completed the top ten. Upon switching settings on his steering wheel, Hamilton spun under braking at turn 12, and Rosberg ran wide at turns 11 and 12. Vergne's session ended early when his engine cut out.

== Qualifying ==
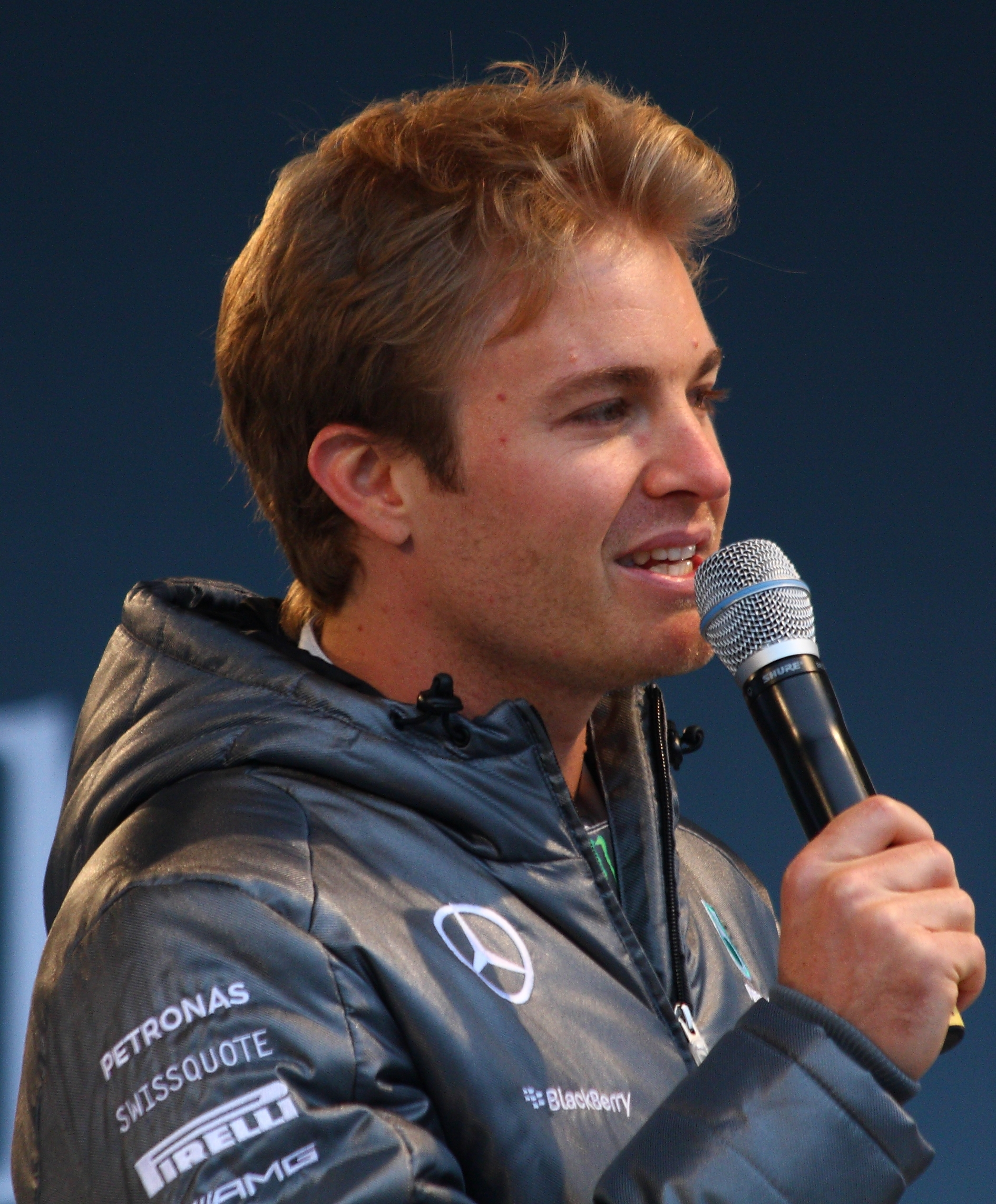
Nico Rosberg had the 13th pole position of his career.

Following the withdrawal of the Caterham and Marussia team's two entries, minor changes were made to Saturday afternoon's three-part qualifying session. The first part ran for 18 minutes, eliminating cars that were 15th or below. The 107% rule was in effect, requiring drivers to reach a time within 107 per cent of the quickest lap to qualify. The second part lasted 15 minutes, eliminating cars in 11th to 14th. The final 12-minute session determined pole position to 10th. Cars who progressed to the final session were not allowed to change tyres for the race's start, using the tyres with which they set their quickest lap times in the second session. Rosberg was fastest in the second and final sessions and achieved his ninth pole position of 2014 and the 13th of his career, with a lap of 1:36.067. He praised the balance of his car but said it was challenging due to track and wind direction changes. Rosberg was joined on the grid's front row by teammate Hamilton, who had a left-front brake 100 °C (212 °F) cooler than the right-front, slowing him. This was observed by him constantly locking the brakes in the second session. Bottas and Massa were third and fourth, and Ricciardo improved greatly on his final timed lap for fifth, ahead Alonso in sixth.

Button qualified seventh, but incurred a five-place grid penalty for changing his gearbox, promoting his teammate Magnussen to seventh. Although Räikkönen in eighth improved his car's balance, he slid multiple times after an unrectifiable frontal problem, creating understeer. Sutil took ninth and Maldonado, who was the fastest driver not to advance into the final session, was 10th, after sliding in turn 19, losing about two-tenths of a second, preventing an improvement. Sergio Pérez, 11th, used two sets of soft tyres in the first session to get into the second. Hülkenberg, 13th, was forecast to qualify in the top ten until a tear-off visor wrapped itself around a front tyre into turn 12, losing grip, ran wide, and lost time. Kvyat complained of tyre temperature issues in slower traffic on his out-lap. However, he incurred a ten-place grid penalty for changing an engine component. His teammate Vergne started 14th and was the fastest driver not to enter the second session, attributing the result to switching to an older, less powerful engine and excess oversteer. Esteban Gutiérrez took 15th ahead of Grosjean. Vettel in 17th opted to do one lap on soft tyres to comply with the 107 per cent rule. He began from the pit lane after changing his engine, his sixth of the season.

=== Qualifying classification ===
The fastest lap in each of the three sessions is denoted in bold.

Pos.	No.	Driver	Constructor	Q1	Q2	Q3	Grid
1	6	(Germany) Nico Rosberg	Mercedes	1:38.303	**1:36.290**	**1:36.067**	1
2	44	(United Kingdom) Lewis Hamilton	Mercedes	**1:37.196**	1:37.287	1:36.443	2
3	77	(Finland) Valtteri Bottas	Williams-Mercedes	1:38.249	1:37.499	1:36.906	3
4	19	(Brazil) Felipe Massa	Williams-Mercedes	1:37.877	1:37.347	1:37.205	4
5	3	(Australia) Daniel Ricciardo	Red Bull Racing-Renault	1:38.814	1:37.873	1:37.244	5
6	14	(Spain) Fernando Alonso	Ferrari	1:38.349	1:38.010	1:37.610	6
7	22	(United Kingdom) Jenson Button	McLaren-Mercedes	1:38.574	1:38.024	1:37.655	12^{1}
8	20	(Denmark) Kevin Magnussen	McLaren-Mercedes	1:38.557	1:38.047	1:37.706	7
9	7	(Finland) Kimi Räikkönen	Ferrari	1:38.669	1:38.263	1:37.804	8
10	99	(Germany) Adrian Sutil	Sauber-Ferrari	1:38.855	1:38.378	1:38.810	9
11	13	(Venezuela) Pastor Maldonado	Lotus-Renault	1:38.608	1:38.467	N/A	10
12	11	(Mexico) Sergio Pérez	Force India-Mercedes	1:39.200	1:38.554	N/A	11
13	27	(Germany) Nico Hülkenberg	Force India-Mercedes	1:38.931	1:38.598	N/A	13
14	26	(Russia) Daniil Kvyat	Toro Rosso-Renault	1:38.936	1:38.699	N/A	17^{2}
15	25	(France) Jean-Éric Vergne	Toro Rosso-Renault	1:39.250	N/A	N/A	14
16	21	(Mexico) Esteban Gutiérrez	Sauber-Ferrari	1:39.555	N/A	N/A	15
17	1	(Germany) Sebastian Vettel	Red Bull Racing-Renault	1:39.621	N/A	N/A	PL^{3}
18	8	(France) Romain Grosjean	Lotus-Renault	1:39.679	N/A	N/A	16
107% time: 1:43.999

Notes

- **^1** – Jenson Button dropped five places on the starting grid due to a gearbox change to his McLaren.
- **^2** – Daniil Kvyat was demoted ten places on the starting grid due to an engine change to his Toro Rosso.
- **^3** – Sebastian Vettel was required to start the race from pit lane after being penalised for exceeding the season limit of five power unit component changes, by changing a sixth on his Red Bull prior to qualifying.

== Race ==
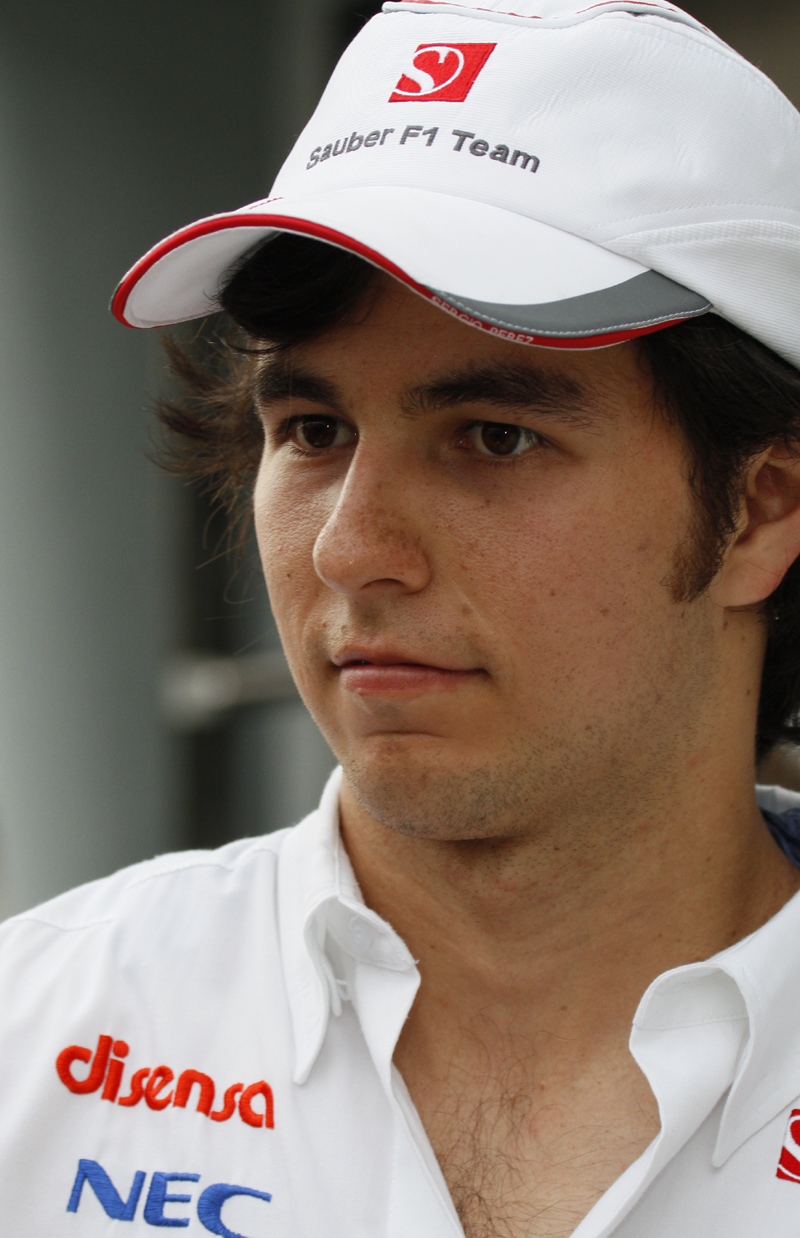
Sergio Pérez (pictured in 2011) retired on the first lap following a collision with Kimi Räikkönen and Adrian Sutil.

The race began before 107,778 people at 14:00 Central Time Zone (UTC−06:00), in dry and sunny weather with an air temperature of 23 °C (73 °F) and a track temperature of between 31 and 34 °C (88 and 93 °F). Every driver, bar Vettel, Kvyat and Hülkenberg, started on the soft compound tyres. The trio began on the medium compound tyres. A strong cross wind cutting through turns three and five caused cars to oversteer. When the race began, Rosberg maintained the lead into the first corner. Hamilton. who put his car at an angle towards Rosberg, stayed in second. Wheelspin dropped Bottas behind his teammate Massa. Alonso attempted to pass Bottas into turn two for fourth but slowed in doing so. Ricciardo also had wheelspin, and fell behind the Ferrari and McLaren cars. He remained on the outside and overtook Button, Räikkönen and Magnussen before turn 12. Pérez glimpsed space to Sutil's left but the extra speed needed to drive alongside caused him to slide into the rear of Räikkönen's car. Räikkonen was able to continue but Pérez ploughed into Sutil. As Sutil spin, he hit Pérez again; both their front wheels interlocked and damaged their suspensions.

Sutil's race was over but Pérez drove his damaged car into the pit lane to retire. The incident necessitated the safety car's deployment to allow track marshals to remove debris. Both McLaren cars, Hülkenberg, Gutiérrez and Vettel made pit stops for the medium tyres. The safety car was withdrawn at the end of lap four and racing resumed with Rosberg leading Hamilton. The duo pulled away from Massa in third who held off his teammate Bottas. Alonso locked his rear wheels, and Ricciardo switched lines to pass him for fifth as he narrowly avoided hitting the rear of Bottas's car. Alonso and Ricciardo were alongside through turn two with Ricciardo keeping fifth by driving onto the artificial grass, causing Alonso to slow through the turn three and four switchback. Räikkönen held off Maldonado's attempts to pass as Vergne unsuccessfully tried to overtake Maldonado into turn one.

On the seventh lap, the stewards placed Vergne, Maldonado, Button and Gutiérrez under investigation for speeding behind the safety car. The Mercedes duo ran close behind each other with Hamilton remaining behind to conserve fuel, and observe the comparison between himself and Rosberg. The tight confines of the second half of the lap gave Hamilton difficulty entering the DRS activation zone before turn 11 and his left-front brake was 100 °C (212 °F) cooler because the safety car was slower. He braked heavily at certain corners to prevent glazing. Grosjean steered right to try and pass Vergne for ninth on the 10th lap but the latter blocked him. It was announced on the following lap no further action would be taken against Button although Vergne, Gutiérrez and Maldonado were imposed five-second stop-and-go penalties to be taken at their next pit stops. Ricciardo ran close behind Bottas but was not fast enough to pass.

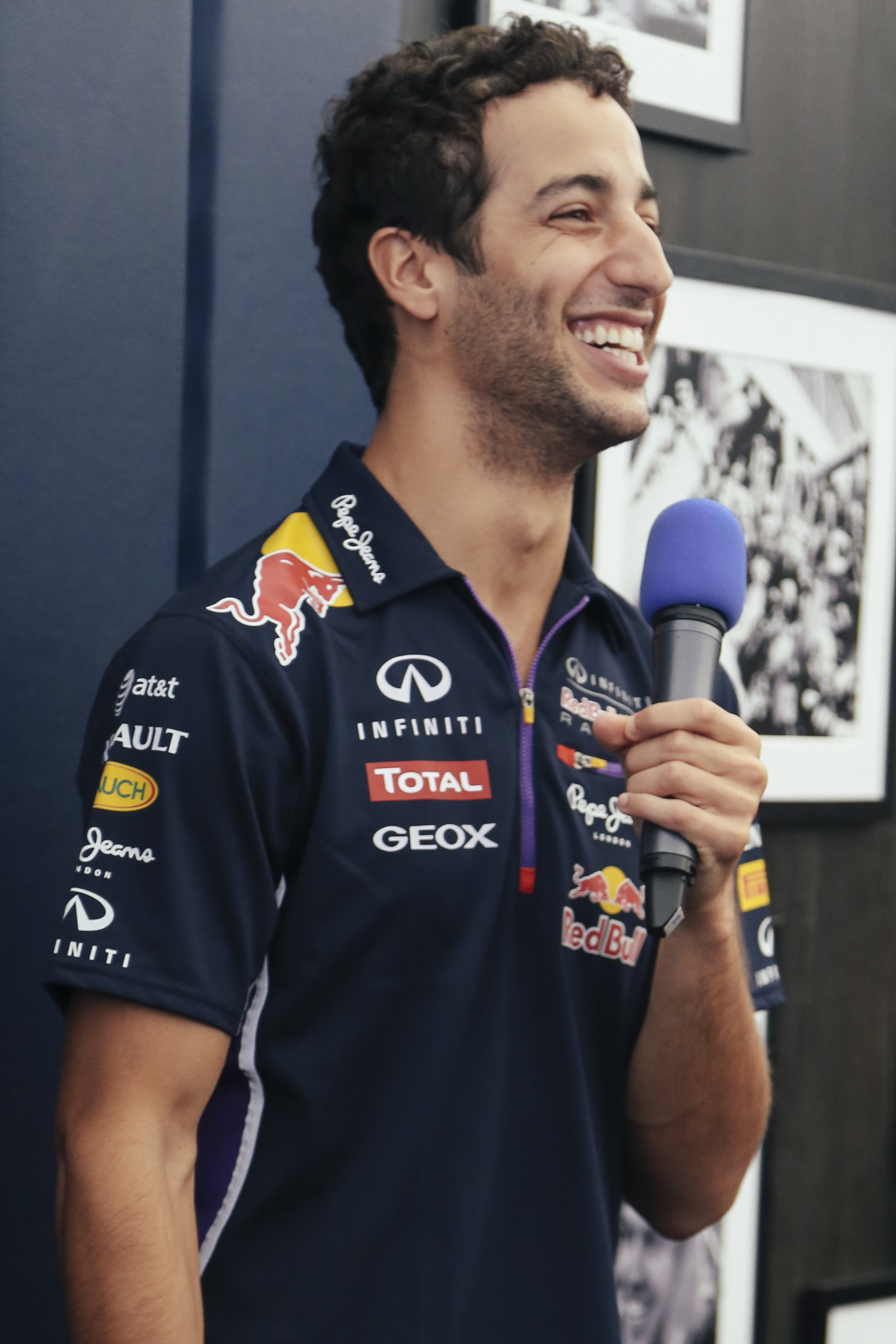
Daniel Ricciardo finished third after getting ahead of both Williams drivers following their pit stops.

Red Bull elected to bring Ricciardo into the pit lane for the medium compound tyres on lap 14. Bottas was vulnerable to Ricciardo passing him and his pace on the lap allowed Ricciardo to draw alongside into turn one after his pit stop. Bottas gained momentum to pass Ricciardo on the outside for fourth place. Rosberg made his pit stop from the lead on lap 15 and fell behind teammate Hamilton. Bottas used DRS to attack Ricciardo into turn 12 but the latter defended. Hamilton was slower than Rosberg and made his pit stop (lap 17) for a front wing adjustment and rejoined with a larger lead over his teammate. Ricciardo continued to hold off the faster Bottas who closed up to him into turn 12. On lap 18, Hülkenberg lost engine power and Sauber instructed him to stop the car at the side of the track on the backstraight to retire. Alonso overtook Vettel for ninth on the next lap.

Hamilton gained on Rosberg enough to use DRS by lap 22. On the following lap Hamilton lined up a pass on his teammate on the back straight but did not get ahead. On lap 24, Rosberg selected a setting intended to give him extra power to defend against Hamilton of which he did not receive. Hamilton slipstreamed Rosberg on the backstraight, used DRS, and drove alongside his teammate going into turn 12. Rosberg attempted to defend his position but Hamilton steered left to overtake him for the lead. Hamilton forced Rosberg onto the run-off area and both drivers narrowly avoided a collision as Hamilton began to pull away from his teammate. Alonso batted Button in the past two laps and overtook him on the outside for seventh place on that lap. Vergne attacked Grosjean on lap 25 after the latter could not overtake the slower Vettel. Grosjean tried again on the next lap and passed Vettel for ninth at the first turn. Alonso overtook Magnussen for sixth with a switchback move at turn one. Over the next two laps, Grosjean and Vergne demoted Button to 10th.

Massa kept reasonably between both Mercedes cars and was 2.4 seconds ahead of Ricciardo. Williams elected to make a pit stop for the medium compound tyres for Bottas at the end of lap 30 and Ricciardo responded by going seven-tenths of a second faster than Bottas in the final third of the lap. Ricciardo made his pit stop on the following lap and emerged ahead of Bottas. He began matching Massa's pace before the latter made a problematic pit stop on lap 32: his mechanics were delayed for one second in the installation of a front tyres, promoting Ricciardo to third. Hamilton entered the pit lane from the lead on the 33rd for his final stop and rejoined in second, behind teammate Rosberg, whom Mercedes told to go faster. Rosberg led lap 34 before making his pit stop, returning the lead to Hamilton. Vettel overtook Grosjean for 10th on lap 37 and drew close to Magnussen soon after. He overtook Magnussen on the outside three laps later but was unable to slow sufficiently and the latter retook ninth.

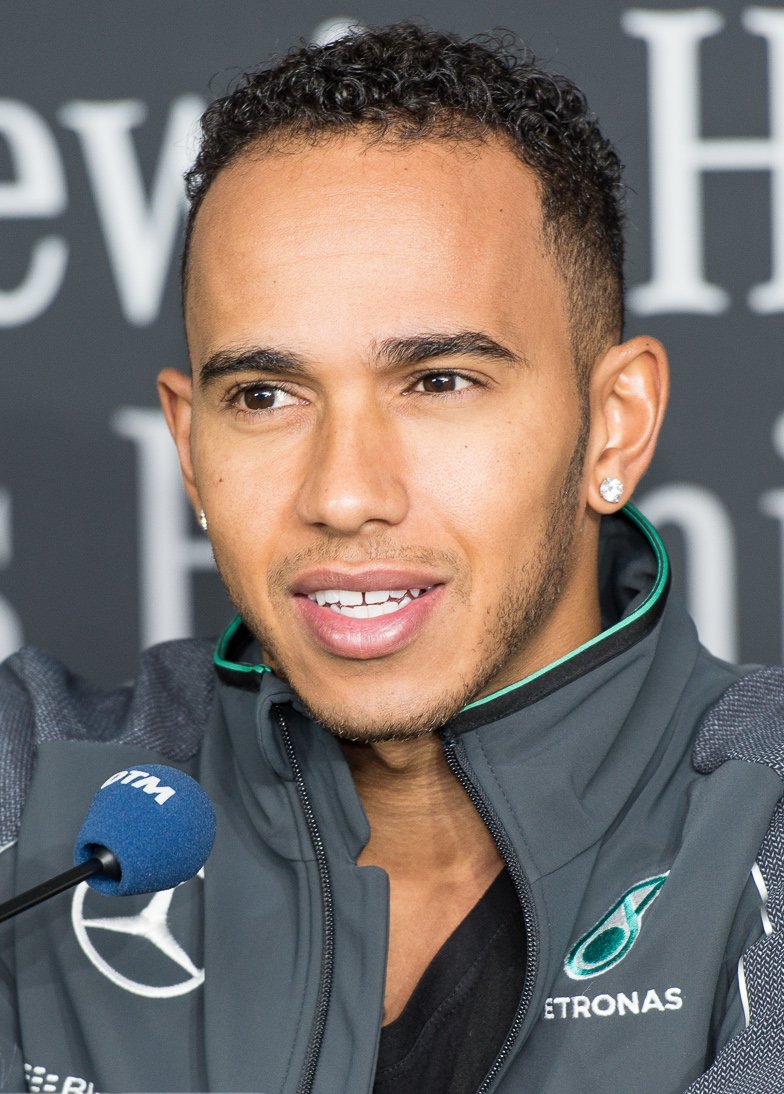
Lewis Hamilton took the 32nd victory of his career, becoming the most successful British driver in Formula One history.

On lap 41, Maldonado incurred a five-second stop-and-go penalty for speeding in the pit lane. Vettel braked later than Magnussen and passed him for ninth on the next lap. Alonso made a pit stop for soft compound tyres on lap 43 and emerged in seventh behind Vettel. He immediately got involved in a three-way battle between Vettel and Magnussen for sixth to eighth. Vettel was unhappy with how his car handled on worn tyres and Alonso passed him with DRS for sixth on lap 46. Rosberg went 1/2 a second quicker than teammate Hamilton to be 1.9 seconds behind at the start of the next lap and Hamilton was radioed to be cautious about tearing up a loose piece of artificial grass exiting turn 19. As Rosberg sought to close up more, Hamilton went quicker to extend his lead by four-tenths of a second. Williams radioed Massa to close up to Ricciardo and went 1/2 a second quicker on lap 49. Vergne and Grosjean made contact at turn one with the former taking ninth on the inside on lap 50, as Maldonado passed his teammate Grosjean for 10th.

On lap 52, an error from Kvyat allowed Räikkönen past. Button lost eighth to Vergne on the same lap and fell behind Vettel on lap 54. Vettel overtook Vergne for ninth on the next lap. Slower traffic delayed Hamilton, reducing his lead to 2.1 seconds when the final lap began, but his teammate Rosberg was also baulked, allowing Hamilton to win by 4.3 seconds. Ricciardo finished third, 1.3 seconds ahead of Massa in fourth. Bottas, Alonso, Vettel, Magnussen, Maldonado finished in positions five to nine. Vergne finished 10th after a five-second time penalty for the collision with Grosjean. Grosjean, Button, Räikkönen, Gutiérrez and Kvyat were the final classified finishers. It was Hamilton's 10th win of 2014 and the 32nd of his career, breaking Nigel Mansell's record for the most race victories by a British driver. (Note: Hamilton had previously won in the United States at Indianapolis Motor Speedway in 2007 while driving for McLaren.) There were five lead changes in the race; two drivers reached the front of the field. Hamilton led three times for a total of 33 laps, more than any other driver.

=== Post-race ===
At the podium interviews, conducted by 1978 World Champion Mario Andretti, Hamilton was grateful to be at the front of the field and said it was "such a privilege" to represent his nation. Rosberg said he found a rhythm he liked when Hamilton passed him. Ricciardo thanked his team for providing him with a podium-contending car and was "really happy" to finish third. In the later press conference, Hamilton said upon passing Rosberg, he controlled the pace by managing tyre wear, and was unhindered by brake locking. Rosberg stated there were no lasting problems after driving over the kerbs but was fully committed to gaining on his teammate. Ricciardo said he felt his team's strategy allowed him to pass the Williams cars and believed he was at fault for his slow start, which he intended to correct before the Brazilian Grand Prix.

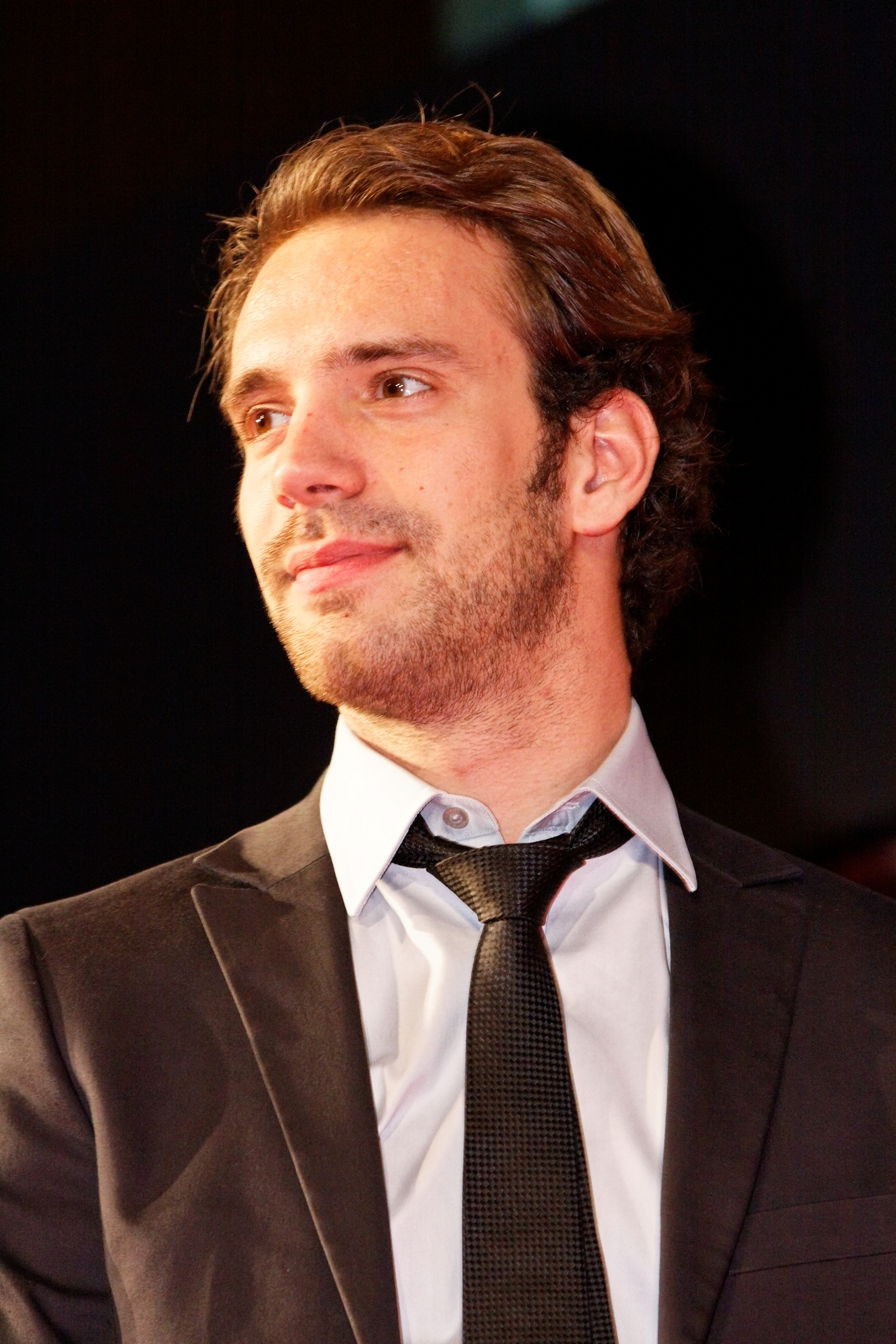
Jean-Éric Vergne (pictured in 2012) was demoted to 10th for colliding with Romain Grosjean and was handed one super licence penalty point.

Along with his five-second time penalty for forcing Grosjean off the track, Vergne incurred one penalty point on his super licence, his third of the season. Vergne said he wanted to move up the field late on, and that the contact with Grosjean as part of motor sport. Grosjean stated it was "really frustrating" not to finish in the top ten, and that the collision with Vergne damaged his front wing and floor, making his car difficult to control for the final laps. For the contact with Sutil and Räikkonen, a seven-place grid penalty was imposed on Pérez for the Brazilian Grand Prix along with two penalty points on his super licence. Pérez described the situation as "unfortunate" and did not anticipate Räikkönen being in the place that he was. Sutil was frustrated over the crash, which prevented him from scoring Sauber's first championship points of 2014, describing it "such a shame and so disappointing" and called the incident "unnecessary": "We were hoping for a great result today and because of a silly action like this we missed everything."

Räikkonen disliked the situation he found himself in during the race by making three pit stops, complaining of heavy front tyre degradation and excess understeer. He said neither he or Ferrari identified the source of the problem but appreciated assistance: "To try and drive slowly in certain places didn't make any difference so I don't understand it really. Wherever we finished it's pretty disappointing. Not being able to solve certain issues is frustrating. Hopefully something comes up and we find what the issues are." Similarly, Alonso complained his car had severe tyre vibrations in the final two laps, reducing his visibility: "I tried to control the pace. I was asking for a gap from behind to cross the line just in front of them. But then Vettel overtook [Kevin] Magnussen and there was no time to save any more so on the last lap I was flat out with huge vibrations." The Williams performance chief Rob Smedley suspected minor issues such as Massa's slow pit stop prevented the team from finishing on the podium. Red Bull team principal Christian Horner said Vettel's first lap pit stop for the medium tyres was done with the intention of not using soft tyres for the rest of the race.

The result increased Hamilton's lead over Rosberg in the World Drivers' Championship to 24 championship points. Ricciardo remained in third but by finishing third was excluded from title contention. Bottas in fourth moved another four championship points clear of Vettel in fifth. Mercedes further extended its unassailable lead in the World Constructors' Championship to 245 championship points over Red Bull in second. Williams and Ferrari remained in third and fourth and McLaren were fifth on 147 championship points with two races left in the season.

=== Race classification ===
Drivers who scored championship points are denoted in bold.

Pos.	No.	Driver	Constructor	Laps	Time/Retired	Grid	Points
1	44	**(United Kingdom) Lewis Hamilton**	**Mercedes**	56	1:40:04.785	2	25
2	6	**(Germany) Nico Rosberg**	**Mercedes**	56	+4.314	1	18
3	3	**(Australia) Daniel Ricciardo**	**Red Bull Racing-Renault**	56	+25.560	5	15
4	19	**(Brazil) Felipe Massa**	**Williams-Mercedes**	56	+26.924	4	12
5	77	**(Finland) Valtteri Bottas**	**Williams-Mercedes**	56	+30.992	3	10
6	14	**(Spain) Fernando Alonso**	**Ferrari**	56	+1:35.231	6	8
7	1	**(Germany) Sebastian Vettel**	**Red Bull Racing-Renault**	56	+1:35.734	PL	6
8	20	**(Denmark) Kevin Magnussen**	**McLaren-Mercedes**	56	+1:40.682	7	4
9	13	**(Venezuela) Pastor Maldonado**	**Lotus-Renault**	56	+1:47.870	10	2
10^{4}	25	**(France) Jean-Éric Vergne**	**Toro Rosso-Renault**	56	+1:48.863	14	1
11	8	(France) Romain Grosjean	Lotus-Renault	55	+1 Lap	16	
12	22	(United Kingdom) Jenson Button	McLaren-Mercedes	55	+1 Lap	12	
13	7	(Finland) Kimi Räikkönen	Ferrari	55	+1 Lap	8	
14	21	(Mexico) Esteban Gutiérrez	Sauber-Ferrari	55	+1 Lap	15	
15	26	(Russia) Daniil Kvyat	Toro Rosso-Renault	55	+1 Lap	17	
Ret	27	(Germany) Nico Hülkenberg	Force India-Mercedes	16	Engine	13	
Ret	11	(Mexico) Sergio Pérez	Force India-Mercedes	1	Collision damage	11	
Ret	99	(Germany) Adrian Sutil	Sauber-Ferrari	0	Collision	9	

Notes:

- **^4** – Jean-Éric Vergne originally finished ninth, but had five seconds added to race time for making contact with Romain Grosjean while overtaking him.

== Championship standings after the race ==
Drivers' Championship standings

+/–	Pos.	Driver	Points
	1	(United Kingdom) **Lewis Hamilton***	316
	2	(Germany) **Nico Rosberg***	292
	3	(Australia) Daniel Ricciardo	214
	4	(Finland) Valtteri Bottas	155
	5	(Germany) Sebastian Vettel	149

Constructors' Championship standings

+/–	Pos.	Driver	Points
	1	(Germany) **Mercedes**	608
	2	(Austria) Red Bull Racing-Renault	363
	3	(United Kingdom) Williams-Mercedes	238
	4	(Italy) Ferrari	196
	5	(United Kingdom) McLaren-Mercedes	147
Sources:

- Note: Only the top five positions are included for both sets of standings.
- **Bold text** indicates 2014 World Constructors' Champions.
- **Bold text** and an asterisk indicates competitors who still had a theoretical chance of becoming World Champion.

== Explanatory notes and references ==
=== References ===
Previous race: 2014 Russian Grand Prix	FIA Formula One World Championship; 2014 season	Next race: 2014 Brazilian Grand Prix
Previous race: 2013 United States Grand Prix	United States Grand Prix	Next race: 2015 United States Grand Prix
