= 2014 Russian Grand Prix =

Formula One motor race held in 2014

Race 16 of 19 in the 2014 Formula One World Championship
| ← Previous race | Next race → |
- Layout of the Sochi Autodrom

Race details
- Date: 12 October 2014
- Official name: 2014 Formula 1 Russian Grand Prix
- Location: Sochi Autodrom, Sochi, Krasnodar Krai, Russia
- Course: Semi-permanent racing facility
- Course length: 5.848 km (3.634 miles)
- Distance: 53 laps, 309.745 km (192.467 miles)
- Weather: Fine and dry; 21 °C (70 °F) ambient temperature, 33 °C (91 °F) track temperature
- Attendance: 65,000

Pole position
| Driver | (United Kingdom) Lewis Hamilton | Mercedes |
- Time: 1:38.513

Fastest lap
| Driver | (Finland) Valtteri Bottas | Williams-Mercedes |
- Time: 1:40.896 on lap 53

Podium
| First | (United Kingdom) Lewis Hamilton | Mercedes |
| Second | (Germany) Nico Rosberg | Mercedes |
| Third | (Finland) Valtteri Bottas | Williams-Mercedes |

The 2014 Russian Grand Prix (formally known as the 2014 Formula 1 Russian Grand Prix; Russian: Гран-при России 2014 года, romanized: Gran-pri Rossii 2014 goda) was a Formula One motor race held on 12 October 2014. The fifty-three lap race was held at the Sochi Autodrom, a brand new circuit built on the site of the 2014 Winter Olympics in the city of Sochi in Krasnodar Krai, Russia.

The race was the sixteenth round of the 2014 season, following on from the Japanese Grand Prix at Suzuka one week previously, and preceding the United States Grand Prix at the Circuit of the Americas. The race marked the first time that the Russian Grand Prix had been held in a century, and was also the first time the Russian Grand Prix was run as a round of the Formula One World Championship since the championship was formed in 1950.

Lewis Hamilton in a Mercedes won the race after starting from pole position and leading every lap. His teammate Nico Rosberg finished second, after working his way up from the back of field after having to make an unscheduled pit stop on the first lap. Williams's Valtteri Bottas completed the podium, having set the fastest lap—and a new lap record—on the final lap of the race. Following Jules Bianchi's serious accident in the Japanese Grand Prix, Marussia entered a single car for Max Chilton, leaving the grid with twenty-one cars. The race ultimately proved to be Marussia's last of the season, as the team went into administration ahead of the next race in the United States. (Note: The Marussia entry and assets were subsequently purchased by Manor Motorsport—the team that had run Marussia's trackside operations since their inception as Virgin Racing in 2010—who contested the 2015 season under the Marussia name.)

The result secured the World Constructors' Championship for Mercedes with three races remaining in the season, while Hamilton extended his World Drivers' Championship lead over Rosberg to seventeen points. Bottas's podium allowed him to overtake Fernando Alonso and Sebastian Vettel in the drivers' standings.

== Background ==
=== Preparations ===
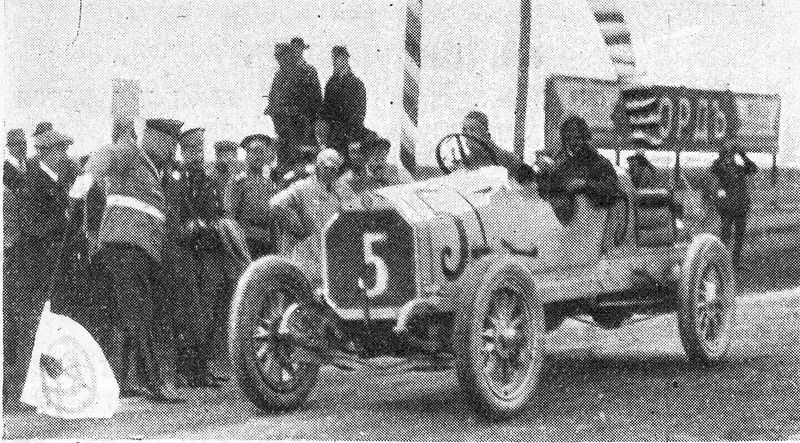
The Russian Grand Prix was first run in 1913 and again in 1914 before the event was discontinued until its revival in 2014. Pictured is Georgy Suvorin, the winner of the 1913 race.

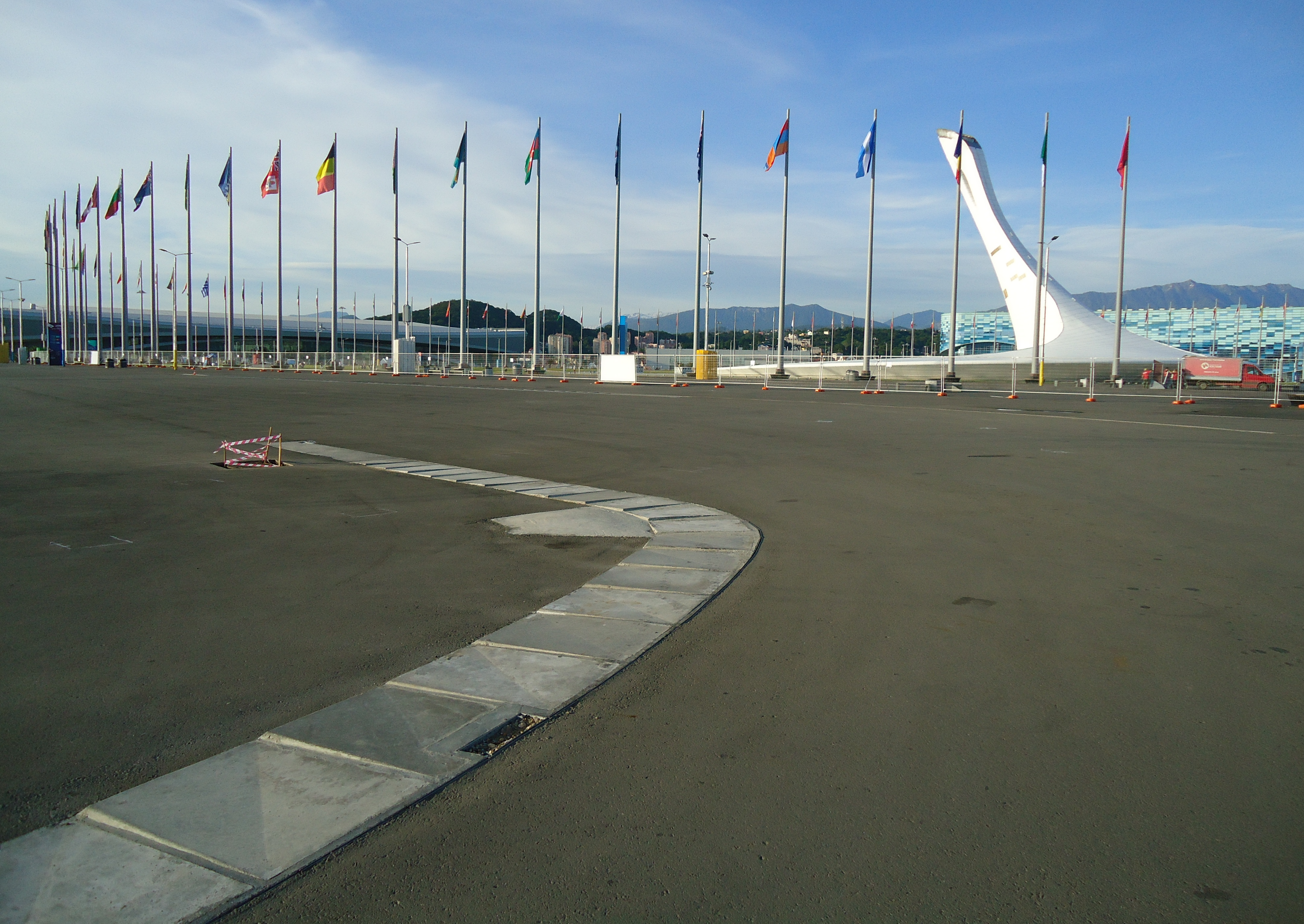
The Sochi Autodrom was built on the site of the 2014 Winter Olympics in the city of Sochi. Seen here is the apex of turn 5 during construction, opposite the Medals Plaza.

With the circuit being built on the site of the 2014 Winter Olympics, the International Olympic Committee voiced concerns that construction would interrupt preparations for the Olympics, and so were given the power to postpone the inaugural Russian Grand Prix until the 2015 season if preparations for the race interfered with the Winter Olympics. However, the Olympic Games started without interruption, and the IOC did not exercise their power. FIA Race Director Charlie Whiting inspected the circuit in the week before the 2014 Belgian Grand Prix and gave it the FIA's final seal of approval, allowing the race to go ahead.

In September 2014, the circuit hosted a round of the Russian Touring Car Championship as preparation for the Grand Prix.

=== Controversy ===
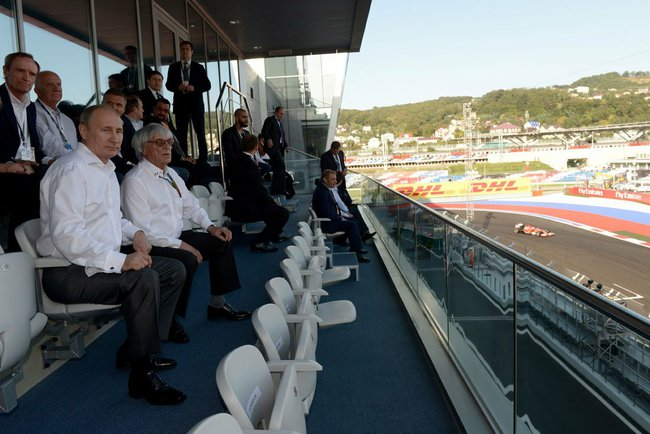
Russian President Vladimir Putin (foreground, left) and Formula One Administration CEO Bernie Ecclestone (foreground, right), spectating during the Grand Prix.

Following the shooting down of Malaysia Airlines Flight 17 over eastern Ukraine in July 2014 and amid allegations of Russian involvement in the incident and the Russian military intervention in the country, there were calls from the British Conservative Party for Formula One to abandon the race as part of sanctions placed on the Russian government, as the race was established with financial support from the government. Similar suggestions were made from British and German parliamentarians over Russia's hosting of the 2018 FIFA World Cup.

When responding to questions about the race—and humanitarian concerns over the revival of the European Grand Prix in Azerbaijan given Azerbaijan's human rights record—Red Bull Racing team principal Christian Horner refused to offer any kind of judgement, pointing out that it was the responsibility of the FIA to monitor the situation and act accordingly; a position supported by Mercedes director Toto Wolff. Bernie Ecclestone, CEO of the sport's commercial rights holder, publicly stated that he had "no doubts" about the race taking place in the wake of the crash, and distanced the sport from ongoing political debates. With Russia facing increased economic sanctions from the European Union and United States, deputy Prime Minister Dmitry Kozak noted that the Grand Prix would not be affected in the event such sanctions were implemented, and the race went ahead as scheduled. Both Vladimir Putin and Dmitry Kozak were in attendance, with Putin presenting the race winner's trophy.

=== Support events ===
The GP2 and GP3 Series—a pair of feeder championships for drivers preparing for Formula One—also made their début at the circuit, racing in support of the Grand Prix as the penultimate round of the 2014 GP2 and GP3 championships.

== Report ==
=== Pre-event ===
==== Marussia entry ====
Marussia driver Jules Bianchi suffered serious head injuries at the Japanese Grand Prix when he crashed into a tractor trying to recover Adrian Sutil's Sauber under yellow-flag conditions, ruling him out of the Russian Grand Prix. Per FIA regulations, the team entered two cars, with Alexander Rossi, their testing and reserve driver, being named as Bianchi's replacement for the event. However, before Friday's practice sessions and with FIA approval, the team opted not to run the second Marussia MR03 car and Max Chilton was their sole representative, leaving the grid with twenty-one cars. As a sign of respect to Bianchi and his family, the team built up and placed his car in his side of the garage and had his livery placed on the walls for the duration of the weekend.

===== Tributes to Jules Bianchi =====
There were several tributes at this Grand Prix to show support for Bianchi:

- Marussia adopted a "#JB17" livery on the cockpit sides of its sole participating car;
- Drivers wore a sticker on their helmets saying "Tous avec Jules #17", and held a one-minute silence just before the race.

==== Penalties ====
Pastor Maldonado incurred a ten-place penalty at the Japanese Grand Prix for exceeding his quota of five engine components for the season. However, as he qualified seventeenth, he was unable to take the full penalty as doing so would move him past twenty-second and last place on the grid. Under new rules introduced for the 2014 season, the remainder of the penalty was carried over to the Russian Grand Prix, automatically giving him a five-place penalty.

==== Tyres ====
Tyre supplier Pirelli announced that they would be providing teams with their medium-compound tyre as a "prime" tyre and the soft-compound as the "option" tyre for the Grand Prix to cope with the brand-new surface and to tolerate the high lateral loads placed on the tyre, particularly through turn 4, an elongated constant-radius corner with estimated speeds of 200 km/h (120 mph) that stands out as the longest corner on the 2014 Formula One calendar.

==== Drag reduction system ====
Two drag reduction system (DRS) zones were introduced for the race. The detection point for the first was located on the entry to turn 1, with the activation zone placed on the apex of the corner. The second detection point was positioned along the circuit's back straight, with the activation zone encompassing turns 12 and 13.

=== Free practice ===
In accordance with the 2014 regulations, three free practice sessions were held. Two one and a half-hour sessions on Friday and another one-hour session on Saturday morning. Per the regulations the teams were allowed to replace one of their regular drivers with a test and reserve driver during the first two sessions. Mercedes's Nico Rosberg set the fastest time in the first free practice session, seven hundredths of a second ahead of teammate Lewis Hamilton, and two tenths of a second faster than McLaren's Jenson Button. Elsewhere, Williams's Valtteri Bottas carried out limited running after the tyre blankets designed to keep his tyres at the optimal operating temperature were found to have failed, damaging his tyres. Russian driver Sergey Sirotkin made his Formula One début, driving for Sauber in the place of Esteban Gutiérrez. He finished the session seventeenth overall, two and a half seconds slower than Rosberg and four tenths of a second behind Sauber teammate Adrian Sutil. Roberto Merhi also took part, driving in the place of Caterham's Kamui Kobayashi in his third appearance of the season for the team.

Hamilton led the way in the second free practice session, finishing eight tenths of a second ahead of Kevin Magnussen and Ferrari's Fernando Alonso. Rosberg finished fourth, though he made a mistake on his final flying lap. Hamilton was again fastest in the third practice session, three tenths of a second quicker than Rosberg, with Bottas in third. Several drivers encountered trouble whilst simulating a qualifying lap, most notably Magnussen, who damaged his suspension after running wide over a kerb; and Hamilton, who spun at the penultimate corner, narrowly avoiding the wall. Pastor Maldonado was unable to set a lap time after his energy recovery system failed. Aided by practice and qualifying sessions from the GP2 and GP3 Series support categories, the track evolved to the point where drivers were setting lap times three and a half seconds quicker ahead of qualifying than they had been at the start of the weekend.

Following the first day's running, officials made several changes to the circuit, including the installation of speed bumps in the turn 2–3 run-off area to discourage drivers from deliberately running wide to carry more speed into turn 4, a practice that had been observed during the free practice and qualifying sessions for the GP2 and GP3 races. The pit lane speed was also revised from 80 km/h (50 mph) to 60 km/h (37 mph) to address concerns over the narrow pit entry and its tight corners.

=== Qualifying ===
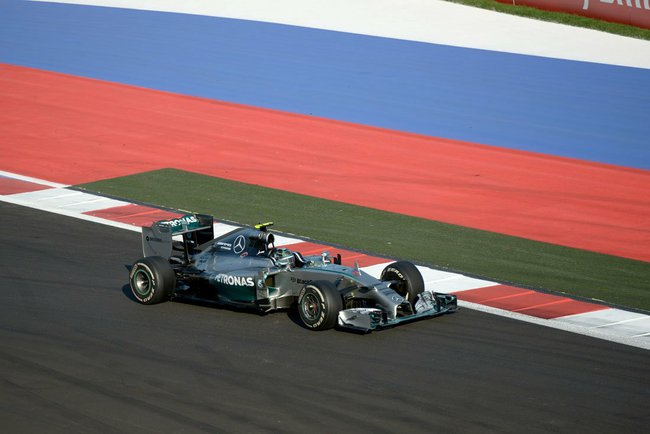
Mercedes secured their fifteenth pole position in sixteen Grands Prix and their eighth front-row lock-out of the season in Sochi.

Normally qualifying consists of three parts, 18, 15 and 12 minutes in length respectively, with six drivers eliminated from competing after each of the first two sessions. However, with Marussia's permission to run a single car for the race, the qualifying procedure was revised, with five drivers—instead of the usual six—eliminated at the end of the first part of qualifying (Q1).

Lewis Hamilton topped the first period, going under 1:39.000 for the first time all weekend. Nico Rosberg was a close second, with Valtteri Bottas the only other driver within a second of Hamilton's lap time. Marcus Ericsson was eliminated in seventeenth place, once again out-qualifying teammate Kamui Kobayashi, who finished nineteenth. After struggling with another engine fault, Pastor Maldonado could only set a time good enough for twentieth, out-qualifying the sole Marussia of Max Chilton. Williams driver Felipe Massa proved to be a shock elimination, struggling with a fuel flow issue that left him down on power; he was recorded going through the speed trap on the approach to turn 2 some 23 km/h (14 mph) slower than Bottas, the fastest driver through the speed trap, and qualified eighteenth for his first Q1 elimination since the British Grand Prix.

Hamilton, Rosberg and Bottas once again led the way in Q2, which saw several drivers in a close fight to avoid elimination. Having struggled with a lack of pace over the course of the weekend, Sebastian Vettel missed out on a Q3 berth by a tenth of a second. He was followed by the Force Indias of Nico Hülkenberg in twelfth and Sergio Pérez in thirteenth, while Esteban Gutiérrez out-qualified Adrian Sutil to give the Saubers fourteenth and fifteenth. Romain Grosjean was the final driver eliminated in Q2 despite having improved upon his Q1 time.

The Mercedes drivers continued to dominate in the final twelve-minute period, but the rapid evolution of the circuit came to an abrupt halt after the first timed laps, and neither Hamilton nor Rosberg were able to improve their times, leaving Hamilton with provisional pole. Despite the lap times dropping off, Valtteri Bottas was able to best Hamilton's time through the first two sectors, and maintained a pace that suggested he could steal a maiden pole position until he made an unforced error in the final corner. Jenson Button finished fourth, with Kevin Magnussen proving McLaren's newfound performance was no accident in sixth. Daniil Kvyat secured a career-best fifth place in his home Grand Prix, while Daniel Ricciardo out-qualified teammate Vettel for the eleventh time in 2014 with seventh. Ferrari endured their most difficult qualifying session since the British Grand Prix, with Fernando Alonso and Kimi Räikkönen closely matched, but over two seconds behind Hamilton. Jean-Éric Vergne finished tenth overall, ensuring two Toro Rossos in the top ten.

==== Post-qualifying ====
Kevin Magnussen and Nico Hülkenberg received five-place grid penalties for gearbox changes, demoting them to eleventh and seventeenth place respectively. Pastor Maldonado qualified in twentieth which became twenty-first once his carry-over penalty was applied. Maldonado and Max Chilton also received a five-place penalty for a gearbox change. (Note: As penalties are applied after qualifying in the order that they are incurred, Pastor Maldonado was considered to have taken his penalty even though the subsequent penalty given to Max Chilton negated it.)

=== Race ===
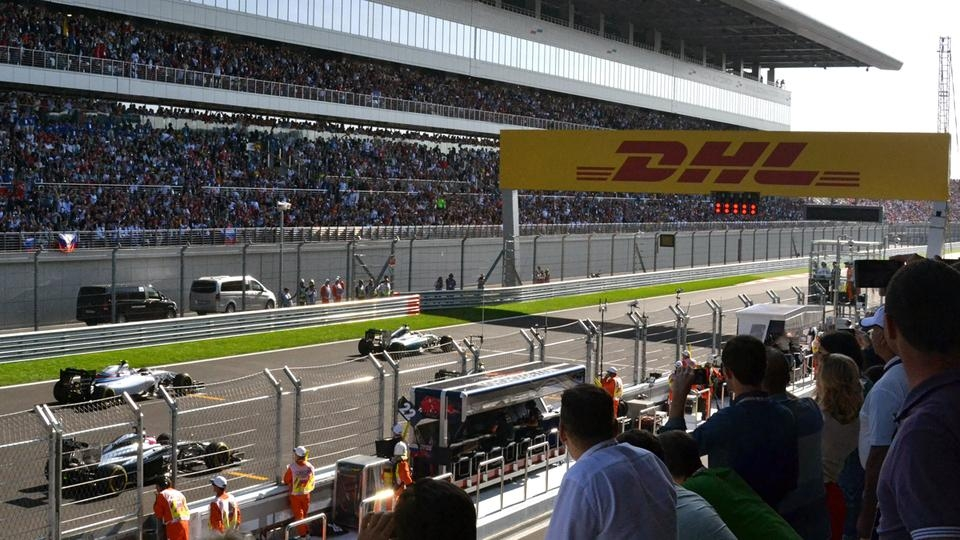
The cars lining up on the starting grid.

At the start of the race, Nico Rosberg attempted to out-brake Lewis Hamilton into turn 2, but locked both of his front wheels, running wide and creating a flat spot on both tyres. After returning the position to Hamilton, he made a pit stop at the end of the lap, as the flat spots would create a vibration in the car given the high speeds and lateral loading on the tyres. He immediately changed to the harder Prime compound, with the team switching to a strategy that called for him to do the next fifty-two laps of the race on a single set of tyres. Rosberg took advantage of the pit strategies of other drivers and the straight-line speed of his car to gradually work his way through the field. Behind him, Felipe Massa attempted to replicate his strategy, also making a pit stop on the first lap, but switching to the softer Option compound. He was less successful than Rosberg, hampered by slower mid-field drivers.

At the front of the field, Valtteri Bottas was able to keep up with Hamilton during the early stages of the race, but Hamilton was able to gradually build up a forty-second lead by the time of the first—and only—round of pit stops, giving him enough of a buffer to pit without losing the lead, even when faced with the lowered speed limit and lengthy pit lane of the Sochi Autodrom. Hamilton was unchallenged throughout the race, ultimately winning by thirteen seconds ahead of Rosberg following his recovery and giving the team their ninth one-two finish of the season. Bottas finished in third, his fifth podium of the season, having been overtaken by Rosberg on track. Despite having fresher tyres and setting a series of laps among the fastest in the race—including the fastest lap and the official lap record—he was unable to catch Rosberg in the final laps.

McLaren drivers Jenson Button and Kevin Magnussen finished fourth and fifth, giving Mercedes-powered cars the top five places in the final standings. McLaren attempted to adjust Button's strategy to place ahead of Rosberg after his pit stop, but were powerless to prevent Rosberg from overtaking. Magnussen spent the early phase of the race in a strategy battle with Fernando Alonso, Daniel Ricciardo and Sebastian Vettel, which he ultimately won. Alonso finished in sixth, the first non-Mercedes-powered driver across the line, having spent most of the race fending off Ricciardo. After spending most of the weekend struggling with an under-powered and under-performing car, Vettel secured four World Championship points with eighth place. Kimi Räikkönen and Sergio Pérez completed the top ten.

Felipe Massa's attempt at replicating Rosberg's strategy failed, leaving him outside the points in eleventh place, ahead of Nico Hülkenberg. Despite qualifying in fifth and tenth, Toro Rosso drivers Daniil Kvyat and Jean-Éric Vergne finished in fourteenth and thirteenth place respectively, having been forced to race conservatively in the face of high fuel consumption and a predicted 12 °C (22 °F) drop in temperature in the final stages of the race, which never eventuated. Esteban Gutiérrez led Sauber teammate Adrian Sutil across the line one lap down with the latter's race having been disrupted by contact with Romain Grosjean at turn 2 for which Grosjean was punished with a five-second stop/go penalty. Grosjean ultimately finished seventeenth ahead of Pastor Maldonado, with Marcus Ericsson the final classified finisher in nineteenth place, two laps behind Hamilton.

The race saw two retirements, with Kamui Kobayashi forced out on lap twenty-one with what the team described as a brake issue, though Kobayashi later suggested that Caterham had deliberately retired the car to avoid damaging its power unit ahead of the next race. He also reported that the team had found damage to a suspension wishbone following free practice 3, and that with no replacement part available, the team had repaired the damage by fusing the wishbone together with carbon, a solution that Kobayashi felt was unsafe. Marussia's difficult race lasted just nine laps, with Max Chilton reporting an unusual vibration in his front-left suspension, and the team elected to retire the car rather than risk a suspension failure.

==== Post-race ====
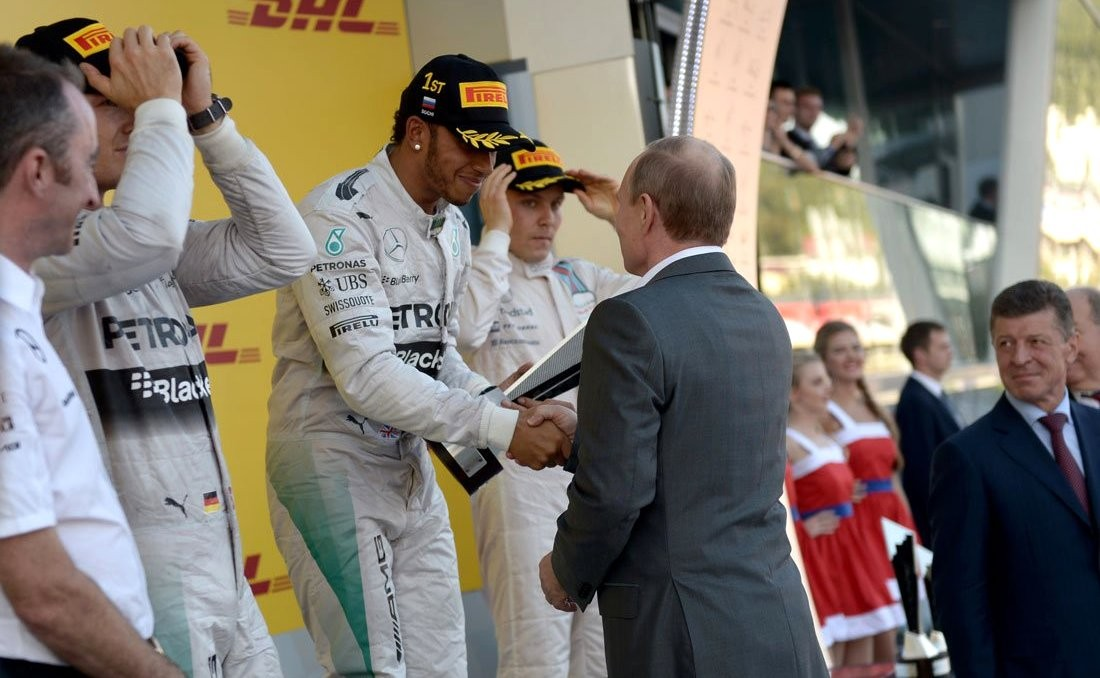
Lewis Hamilton accepting the race winner's trophy from Russian president Vladimir Putin.

With twenty-five points for first place, Lewis Hamilton extended his World Drivers' Championship lead over Nico Rosberg by seven points to carry a seventeen-point margin into the United States Grand Prix. By out-scoring title rivals Red Bull Racing, the result also secured the World Constructors' Championship for Mercedes, their first title as a Formula One constructor. Hamilton dedicated the win to Jules Bianchi.

Valtteri Bottas's podium finish elevated him from sixth to fourth in the drivers' standings, overtaking Sebastian Vettel and Fernando Alonso. The result also allowed Williams to consolidate their hold on third place in the constructors' standings, ahead of Ferrari. Further down the order, fourth and fifth places for McLaren and minor points placings for Force India saw the British team overtake their rivals for fifth place in the standings.

Both Marussia and Caterham went into administration after the race, citing financial difficulties. Although Caterham returned to compete in the Abu Dhabi Grand Prix, the team collapsed shortly thereafter. Marussia faced a similar fate before a last-minute deal with an investor rescued the team, and they returned to the Formula One grid in 2015, albeit registered as a British, rather than Russian competitor.

=== Accolades ===
In December 2014, the race was awarded with the Formula One Promotional Trophy. Dmitry Kozak received the award from Bernie Ecclestone in a special ceremony at the circuit.

== Classification ==
=== Qualifying ===
| Pos. | No. | Driver | Constructor | Q1 | Q2 | Q3 | Grid |
|---|---|---|---|---|---|---|---|
| 1 | 44 | (United Kingdom) Lewis Hamilton | Mercedes | 1:38.759 | 1:38.338 | 1:38.513 | 1 |
| 2 | 6 | (Germany) Nico Rosberg | Mercedes | 1:39.076 | 1:38.606 | 1:38.713 | 2 |
| 3 | 77 | (Finland) Valtteri Bottas | Williams-Mercedes | 1:39.125 | 1:38.971 | 1:38.920 | 3 |
| 4 | 22 | (United Kingdom) Jenson Button | McLaren-Mercedes | 1:39.560 | 1:39.381 | 1:39.121 | 4 |
| 5 | 26 | (Russia) Daniil Kvyat | Toro Rosso-Renault | 1:40.074 | 1:39.296 | 1:39.277 | 5 |
| 6 | 20 | (Denmark) Kevin Magnussen | McLaren-Mercedes | 1:39.735 | 1:39.022 | 1:39.629 | 11^{1} |
| 7 | 3 | (Australia) Daniel Ricciardo | Red Bull Racing-Renault | 1:40.519 | 1:39.666 | 1:39.635 | 6 |
| 8 | 14 | (Spain) Fernando Alonso | Ferrari | 1:40.255 | 1:39.786 | 1:39.709 | 7 |
| 9 | 7 | (Finland) Kimi Räikkönen | Ferrari | 1:40.098 | 1:39.838 | 1:39.771 | 8 |
| 10 | 25 | (France) Jean-Éric Vergne | Toro Rosso-Renault | 1:40.354 | 1:39.929 | 1:40.020 | 9 |
| 11 | 1 | (Germany) Sebastian Vettel | Red Bull Racing-Renault | 1:40.382 | 1:40.052 | | 10 |
| 12 | 27 | (Germany) Nico Hülkenberg | Force India-Mercedes | 1:40.273 | 1:40.058 | | 17^{1} |
| 13 | 11 | (Mexico) Sergio Pérez | Force India-Mercedes | 1:40.723 | 1:40.163 | | 12 |
| 14 | 21 | (Mexico) Esteban Gutiérrez | Sauber-Ferrari | 1:41.159 | 1:40.536 | | 13 |
| 15 | 99 | (Germany) Adrian Sutil | Sauber-Ferrari | 1:40.766 | 1:40.984 | | 14 |
| 16 | 8 | (France) Romain Grosjean | Lotus-Renault | 1:42.526 | 1:41.397 | | 15 |
| 17 | 9 | (Sweden) Marcus Ericsson | Caterham-Renault | 1:42.648 | | | 16 |
| 18 | 19 | (Brazil) Felipe Massa | Williams-Mercedes | 1:43.064 | | | 18 |
| 19 | 10 | (Japan) Kamui Kobayashi | Caterham-Renault | 1:43.166 | | | 19 |
| 20 | 13 | (Venezuela) Pastor Maldonado | Lotus-Renault | 1:43.205 | | | 21^{2} |
| 21 | 4 | (United Kingdom) Max Chilton | Marussia-Ferrari | 1:43.649 | | | 20^{1} |
107% time: 1:45.672

Notes:

- ^1 — Kevin Magnussen, Nico Hülkenberg and Max Chilton all received five-place grid penalties for changing their gearboxes.
- ^2 — Pastor Maldonado received a five-place grid penalty to complete the penalty he received for exceeding his quota of five engine components for the season at the Japanese Grand Prix. He then received a further five-place penalty after qualifying for a gearbox change.

=== Race ===
| Pos. | No. | Driver | Constructor | Laps | Time/Retired | Grid | Points |
|---|---|---|---|---|---|---|---|
| 1 | 44 | (United Kingdom) Lewis Hamilton | Mercedes | 53 | 1:31:50.744 | 1 | 25 |
| 2 | 6 | (Germany) Nico Rosberg | Mercedes | 53 | +13.657 | 2 | 18 |
| 3 | 77 | (Finland) Valtteri Bottas | Williams-Mercedes | 53 | +17.425 | 3 | 15 |
| 4 | 22 | (United Kingdom) Jenson Button | McLaren-Mercedes | 53 | +30.234 | 4 | 12 |
| 5 | 20 | (Denmark) Kevin Magnussen | McLaren-Mercedes | 53 | +53.616 | 11 | 10 |
| 6 | 14 | (Spain) Fernando Alonso | Ferrari | 53 | +1:00.016 | 7 | 8 |
| 7 | 3 | (Australia) Daniel Ricciardo | Red Bull Racing-Renault | 53 | +1:01.812 | 6 | 6 |
| 8 | 1 | (Germany) Sebastian Vettel | Red Bull Racing-Renault | 53 | +1:06.185 | 10 | 4 |
| 9 | 7 | (Finland) Kimi Räikkönen | Ferrari | 53 | +1:18.877 | 8 | 2 |
| 10 | 11 | (Mexico) Sergio Pérez | Force India-Mercedes | 53 | +1:20.067 | 12 | 1 |
| 11 | 19 | (Brazil) Felipe Massa | Williams-Mercedes | 53 | +1:20.877 | 18 | |
| 12 | 27 | (Germany) Nico Hülkenberg | Force India-Mercedes | 53 | +1:21.309 | 17 | |
| 13 | 25 | (France) Jean-Éric Vergne | Toro Rosso-Renault | 53 | +1:37.295 | 9 | |
| 14 | 26 | (Russia) Daniil Kvyat | Toro Rosso-Renault | 52 | +1 Lap | 5 | |
| 15 | 21 | (Mexico) Esteban Gutiérrez | Sauber-Ferrari | 52 | +1 Lap | 13 | |
| 16 | 99 | (Germany) Adrian Sutil | Sauber-Ferrari | 52 | +1 Lap | 14 | |
| 17 | 8 | (France) Romain Grosjean | Lotus-Renault | 52 | +1 Lap | 15 | |
| 18 | 13 | (Venezuela) Pastor Maldonado | Lotus-Renault | 52 | +1 Lap | 21 | |
| 19 | 9 | (Sweden) Marcus Ericsson | Caterham-Renault | 51 | +2 Laps | 16 | |
| Ret | 10 | (Japan) Kamui Kobayashi | Caterham-Renault | 21 | Brakes | 19 | |
| Ret | 4 | (United Kingdom) Max Chilton | Marussia-Ferrari | 9 | Suspension | 20 | |

== Championship standings after the race ==
Drivers' Championship standings

| +/– | Pos. | Driver | Points |
|---|---|---|---|
| | 1 | (United Kingdom) **Lewis Hamilton*** | 291 |
| | 2 | (Germany) **Nico Rosberg*** | 274 |
| | 3 | (Australia) **Daniel Ricciardo*** | 199 |
| 2 | 4 | (Finland) Valtteri Bottas | 145 |
| 1 | 5 | (Germany) Sebastian Vettel | 143 |

Constructors' Championship standings

| +/– | Pos. | Driver | Points |
|---|---|---|---|
| | 1 | (Germany) **Mercedes** | 565 |
| | 2 | (Austria) Red Bull Racing-Renault | 342 |
| | 3 | (United Kingdom) Williams-Mercedes | 216 |
| | 4 | (Italy) Ferrari | 188 |
| 1 | 5 | (United Kingdom) McLaren-Mercedes | 143 |

- Note: Only the top five positions are included for both sets of standings.
- **Bold text** indicates 2014 World Constructors' Champions.
- **Bold text** and an asterisk indicates competitors who still had a theoretical chance of becoming World Champion.

== See also ==
- 2014 Sochi GP2 Series round
- 2014 Sochi GP3 Series round

== Footnotes ==
| Previous race: 2014 Japanese Grand Prix | FIA Formula One World Championship; 2014 season | Next race: 2014 United States Grand Prix |
| Previous race: 1914 Russian Grand Prix | Russian Grand Prix | Next race: 2015 Russian Grand Prix |
Awards
| Preceded by 2013 Brazilian Grand Prix | Formula One Promotional Trophy for Race Promoter; 2014 | Succeeded by 2015 Mexican Grand Prix |
