= 2014 Spanish Grand Prix =

Race 5 of 19 in the 2014 Formula One World Championship
← Previous race	Next race →
- Circuit de Barcelona-Catalunya

Race details
- Date: 11 May 2014
- Official name: Formula 1 Gran Premio de España Pirelli 2014
- Location: Circuit de Barcelona-Catalunya, Montmeló, Catalonia, Spain
- Course: Permanent racing facility
- Course length: 4.655 km (2.892 miles)
- Distance: 66 laps, 307.104 km (190.825 (Note: There is a 0.126 km (0.078 mi) offset between the start and finish lines.) miles)
- Weather: Sunny
- Attendance: 91,480

Pole position
Driver	(United Kingdom) Lewis Hamilton	Mercedes
- Time: 1:25.232

Fastest lap
Driver	(Germany) Sebastian Vettel	Red Bull Racing-Renault
- Time: 1:28.918 on lap 55

Podium
First	(United Kingdom) Lewis Hamilton	Mercedes
Second	(Germany) Nico Rosberg	Mercedes
Third	(Australia) Daniel Ricciardo	Red Bull Racing-Renault

The 2014 Spanish Grand Prix (officially the Formula 1 Gran Premio de España Pirelli 2014) was a Formula One motor race held on 11 May 2014 at the Circuit de Barcelona-Catalunya in Montmeló, Catalonia, Spain. The race was the fifth round of the 2014 Formula One World Championship, the 44th Spanish Grand Prix held as part of the championship, and the 24th in Barcelona. Mercedes driver Lewis Hamilton won the 66-lap race from pole position. His teammate Nico Rosberg finished second and Red Bull's Daniel Ricciardo took third.

Going into the event, Rosberg led the World Drivers' Championship and his team Mercedes led the World Constructors' Championship. Hamilton won the 35th pole position of his career by recording the fastest lap in the third qualifying session. He led the race until his first pit stop at the end of lap 18, promoting Rosberg to first place for the next three laps. Hamilton's Mercedes had oversteer and understeer as Rosberg retook the lead for two laps when Hamilton made a second pit stop on the 43rd lap. He drew to less than a second behind Hamilton by lap 59. Hamilton responded by increasing his speed when he switched to a higher-powered engine setting to keep Rosberg behind for his fourth victory in succession in 2014 and the 26th of his career.

The race result left Hamilton with 100 championship points and the lead of the World Drivers' Championship for the first time since 2012. His teammate Rosberg fell to second and Ferrari's Fernando Alonso remained in third. Sebastian Vettel of Red Bull moved to fourth and Ricciardo advanced from sixth to fifth. Mercedes further increased its advantage over Red Bull atop the World Constructors' Championship to 114 championship points. Ferrari passed Force India for third and Williams moved to fifth with 14 races left in the season.

== Background ==
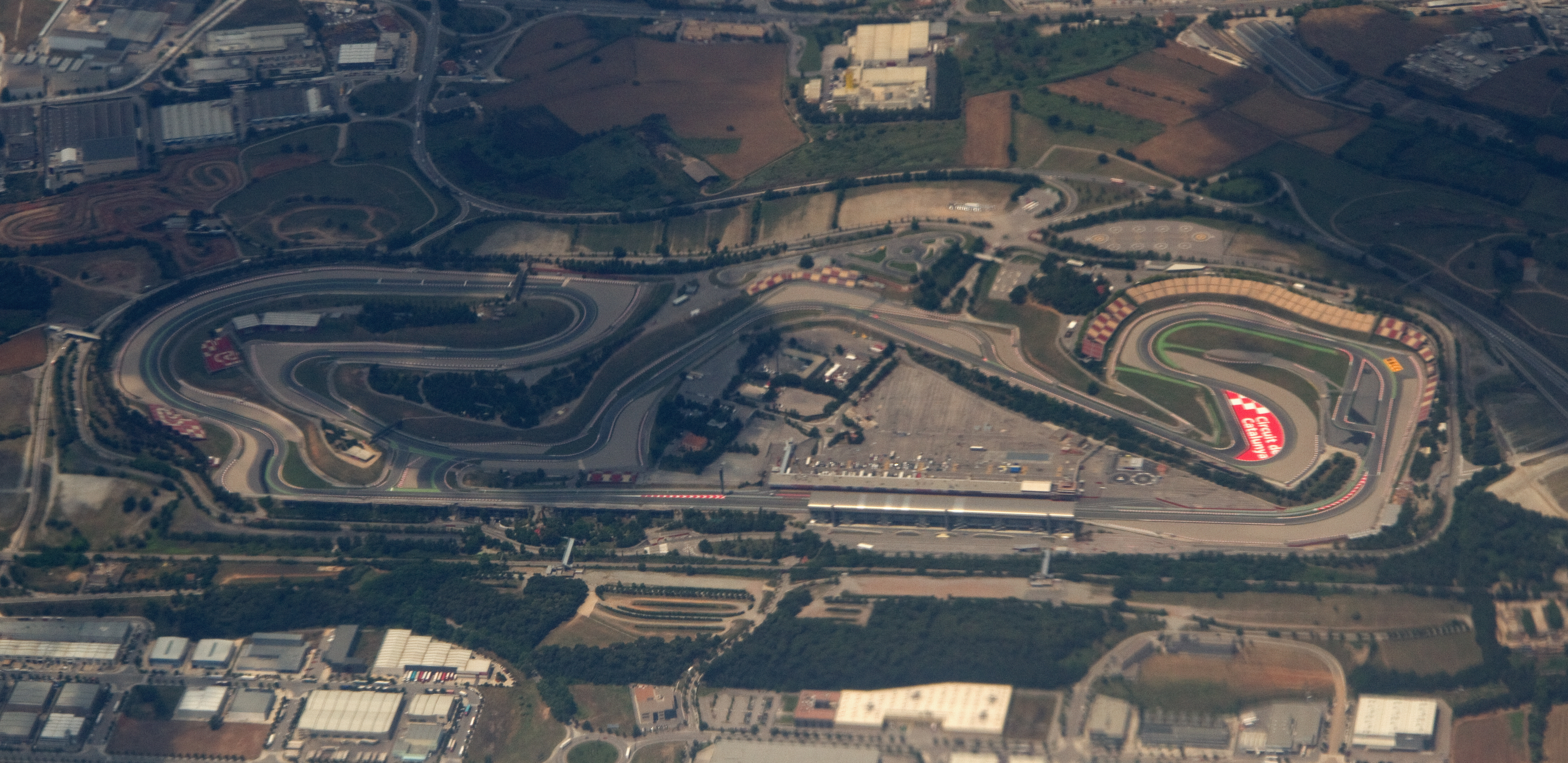
The Circuit de Barcelona-Catalunya (pictured in 2011), where the race was held.

The 2014 Spanish Grand Prix was the fifth of the 19 races of the 2014 Formula One World Championship, the 24th running of the event in Barcelona and the 44th edition since the inception of the series. It was held at the 16-turn 4.655 km (2.892 mi) Circuit de Barcelona-Catalunya in Montmeló, Catalonia on 11 May. The track is heavily dependent on aerodynamic performance due to its number of quick and medium-speed corners. Overtaking is difficult in Barcelona and it required a balanced car setup between the corners and its more technical portions and the circuit is demanding on every car's tyres.

Tyre supplier Pirelli brought the white-banded medium-compound tyres and the orange-banded hard-compound tyres. The drag reduction system (DRS) had two activation zones for the race: one was on the pit lane straight between the final to first corners, and the second was on the straight linking turns nine and ten. After the 2013 round, the kerb on the approach to turn one was renewed and the verge behind it was laid with asphalt. The kerbs leaving turns nine and twelve were replaced and the artificial grass beside it was extended. The 7 m (23 ft) wide gravel trap to the outside of turn eleven was replaced with asphalt.

Entering the event, Mercedes driver Nico Rosberg led the World Drivers' Championship with 79 championship points, four ahead of his teammate Lewis Hamilton in second. Ferrari's Fernando Alonso was third with 41 championship points and Nico Hülkenberg of Force India was fourth with 36 championship points. Red Bull driver Sebastian Vettel was in fifth position with 33 championship points. Mercedes led the World Constructors' Championship with 154 championship points; Red Bull were in second position with 57 championship points and Force India were third with 54 championship points. Ferrari were in fourth place with 52 championship points and McLaren was fifth with 43 championship points.

Mercedes had won every race up to the Spanish Grand Prix with Hamilton winning the previous three races and his teammate Rosberg the season-opening Australian Grand Prix. Despite his recent results, Hamilton spoke of his belief that the momentum would shift between him and Rosberg on different tracks and Hamilton sought to narrow the performance deficit: "My job this year was to try to close the gap a little, which I did – it wasn't [nearly] half a second like it was last year in qualifying – it was [less than] three-tenths. What I'm really trying to focus on is those circuits where I am maybe weaker, or not as close to him." He also said that he anticipated Red Bull and Ferrari to be closer to Mercedes in Barcelona due to his suspicion that their cars were more aerodynamically efficient. Rosberg spoke of his admittance that he needed to regain momentum and sought to win the race and extend his lead in the World Drivers' Championship: "Every weekend is crucial but the results momentum is on his side and I need to try to turn it around."

Several teams made technical changes to their cars. Red Bull introduced a duct near the RB10's rear tyres to redirect airflow and increase its underfloor efficiency. The team also provided Vettel with a new car chassis to improve his performance. Ferrari reverted to using a single pillar rear wing support on the F14 T's centre line, aimed at reducing airflow disturbance and increasing downforce, and therefore grip, produced by the bodywork. Force India debuted a new rear wing mainplane and endplates on the two VJM07s, while McLaren's MP4-29s had their rear bodywork altered to house a revised rear suspension arm and the front wing featured new endplates. Sauber introduced a revised aerodynamic package version of its C33 chassis, which included a modified front wing, new side-pod fins, engine cover and deflectors, reducing the car's overall weight. For both of its E22 cars, Lotus brought a reconfigured engine mapping programme along with a revised cooling system and bodywork package and an updated rear wing.

A total of 11 teams (each representing a different constructor) fielded two race drivers each with two extra participants driving solely in the first free practice session. For the first practice session, Sauber test and reserve driver Giedo van der Garde drove Esteban Gutiérrez's car for the third time in the season, and Valtteri Bottas gave his Williams car to GP2 Series entrant and the team's reserve driver Felipe Nasr for the third race in succession.

== Practice ==
Per the regulations for the 2014 season, three practice sessions were held, two 90-minute sessions on Friday and another 60-minute session on Saturday. In the first session, which took place in clear weather, Hamilton lapped fastest with a time of 1:27.023, 0.868 seconds faster than McLaren's Jenson Button in second who was quickest until Hamilton's lap. Daniel Ricciardo for Red Bull, Alonso, Rosberg, Ferrari's Kimi Räikkönen, McLaren's Kevin Magnussen, Lotus driver Pastor Maldonado, Sergio Pérez of Force India and Williams' Felipe Massa rounded out the top ten. Van Der Garde's brakes failed on the approach to turn one's run-off area; he avoided hitting the left-hand side wall at high speed. Pérez's front-left rearview mirror detached from the mounting although a retaining strap kept it intact. Adrian Sutil in the second Sauber car ran wide at the uphill turn nine and lost control of his car. Vettel stopped at the side of turn six with a damaged wiring loom that forced him to miss the second session while his team rectified it.

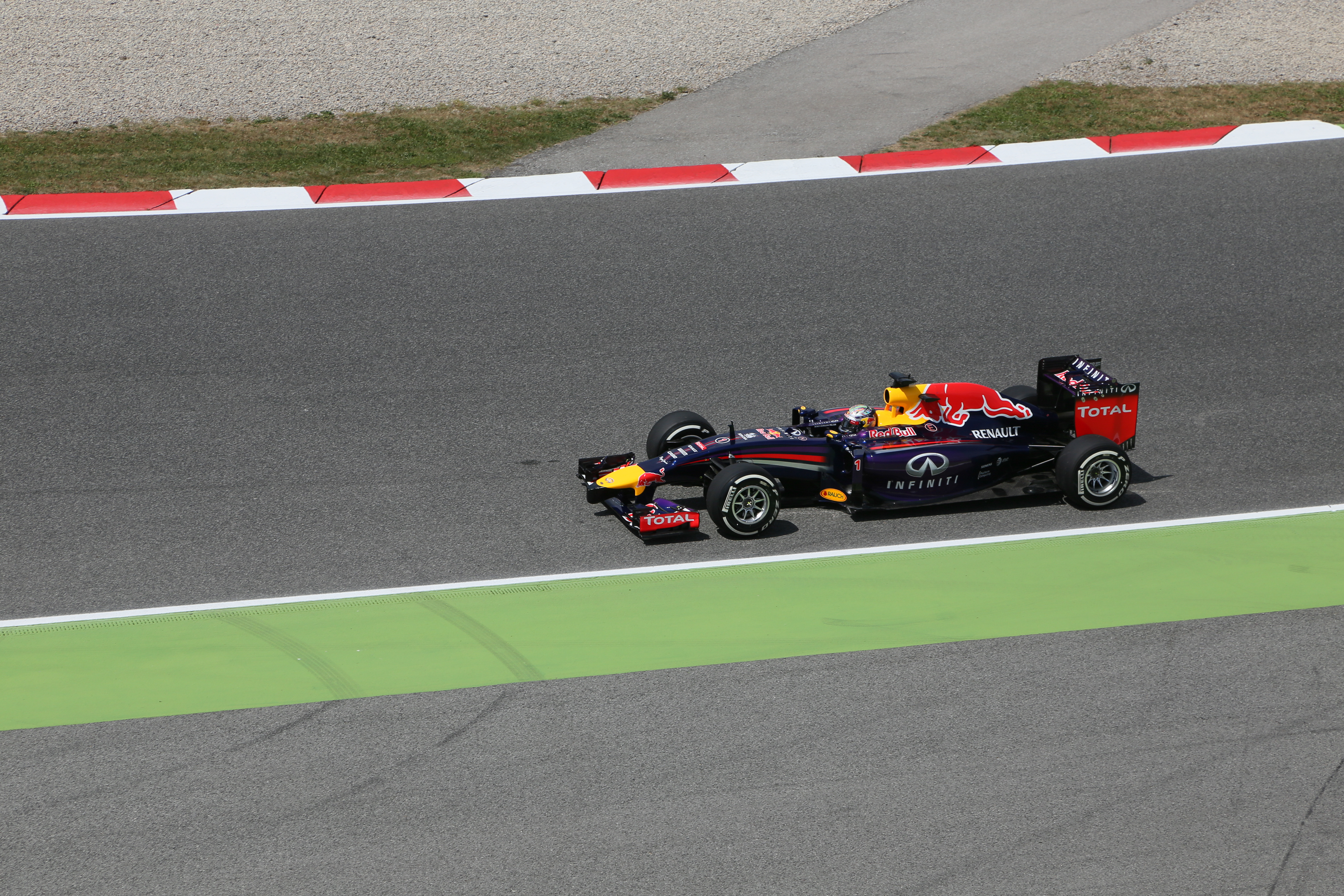
Sebastian Vettel completed minimal running during the Friday practice sessions due to a recurring problem with his Red Bull Racing's wiring loom.

In rising air and track temperatures, Hamilton set the day's fastest lap on the medium compound tyres in the second session at 1:25.524. His teammate Nico Rosberg was second and Ricciardo was third. Alonso and Räikkönen in the two Ferrari cars were fourth and fifth. The McLaren cars of Magnussen and Button, Massa, Maldonado and Toro Rosso's Daniil Kvyat followed in positions six to ten. Engine problems for Max Chilton of Marussia restricted his running early in the session before he completed several laps later on. Yellow flags were waved at the entry to the final corner when a chunk of rear bodywork around the exhaust system of Chilton's car detached, which was retrieved by a track marshal. Chilton later locked his tyres and got stuck in the turn four gravel trap. After the session, Toro Rosso's Jean-Éric Vergne incurred a ten-place grid penalty because the stewards deemed him to have been released from the pit lane with an incorrectly attached right-rear wheel that detached in turn one. The team was fined €30,000.

The third session was held in warm weather and teams analysed how much the hard tyres degraded. Rosberg set the fastest lap of 1:25.887 on the medium compound tyres in clear air. Hamilton, Alonso, Massa, Lotus' Romain Grosjean, Magnussen, Ricciardo, Button, Maldonado and Vettel completed the top ten. During the session, where several drivers had rear grip issues, Chilton locked his front-left wheel and got stuck in the turn five outside gravel trap.

== Qualifying ==
Saturday afternoon's qualifying session was divided into three parts. The first part ran for 18 minutes, eliminating cars that finished the session 17th or below. The 107% rule was in effect, requiring drivers to reach a time within 107 per cent of the quickest lap to qualify. The second session lasted 15 minutes, eliminating cars in 11th to 16th. The final 12-minute session determined pole position to tenth. Cars who progressed to the final session were not allowed to change tyres for the race's start, using the tyres with which they set their quickest lap times in the second session; teams were allowed to switch tyres for the third session before changing them back for the race. Hamilton went fastest in the third session on his final timed lap to earn his fourth pole of 2014 and the 35th of his career with a lap of 1:25.232. He was joined on the grid's front row by his teammate Rosberg who was fastest in the first and second sessions to achieve Mercedes's fourth front row lockout in 2014. Ricciardo qualified third and a set-up change put Bottas fourth. Grosjean started from fifth. An improved car balance, grip and rear stability under braking qualified Räikkönen and his teammate Alonso sixth and seventh. Button in eighth had an overabundance of understeer on his final timed lap. Massa in ninth lost control of the rear of his car braking for the turn 10 hairpin.

Vettel did not set a lap time in the final session because of a gearbox fault that emerged when he exited his garage and stopped at turn three. It prompted a brief stoppage with less than ten minutes remaining while track marshals extricated his car. Vettel later changed his gearbox, and incurred a five-place grid penalty, since gearboxes were required to last a minimum of six consecutive races per series regulations. Hence, Hülkenberg, who changed the setup of his car, began from tenth. His Force India teammate Pérez was 11th after slower traffic compromised his final timed lap, which he aborted to conserve his tyre allocation. Kvyat drove on the hard compound tyres for 12th and Gutiérrez was the faster Sauber driver in 13th. Magnussen's running was curtailed by an engine problem that prevented him from recording a fast lap and he had to start from 14th. Sutil in the second Sauber vehicle had overheated tyres that lost him time and took 16th as Chilton began from 17th. His Marussia teammate Jules Bianchi ran deep at turn 10 on his second timed lap. Marcus Ericsson in 19th qualified ahead of his Caterham teammate Kamui Kobayashi in 20th for the first time in 2014; Kobayashi ran two timed laps on the medium compound tyres but a car imbalance and a delay by Bianchi slowed him. Maldonado failed to set a lap after he lost control of the rear of his car on the artificial grass at the exit of turn three and struck the inside concrete barrier, damaging his front right suspension and stopped the first session for seven minutes.

=== Post-qualifying ===
The stewards allowed Maldonado to start the race after judging him to have lapped within the 107 per cent limit in all three practice sessions. At the pre-race drivers' briefing, the Fédération Internationale de l'Automobile race director Charlie Whiting told drivers that if they did not maintain a consistent and acceptable pace and an improvement in behaviour during the formation lap, then they faced being penalised. Whiting's warning came after several drivers raised concerns about the formation laps going too slowly in past events in 2014.

=== Qualifying classification ===
The fastest lap in each of the three sessions is denoted in bold.

Pos.	No.	Driver	Constructor	Q1	Q2	Q3	Grid
1	44	(United Kingdom) Lewis Hamilton	Mercedes	1:27.238	1:26.210	**1:25.232**	1
2	6	(Germany) Nico Rosberg	Mercedes	**1:26.764**	**1:26.088**	1:25.400	2
3	3	(Australia) Daniel Ricciardo	Red Bull Racing-Renault	1:28.053	1:26.613	1:26.285	3
4	77	(Finland) Valtteri Bottas	Williams-Mercedes	1:28.198	1:27.563	1:26.632	4
5	8	(France) Romain Grosjean	Lotus-Renault	1:28.472	1:27.258	1:26.960	5
6	7	(Finland) Kimi Räikkönen	Ferrari	1:28.308	1:27.335	1:27.104	6
7	14	(Spain) Fernando Alonso	Ferrari	1:28.329	1:27.602	1:27.140	7
8	22	(United Kingdom) Jenson Button	McLaren-Mercedes	1:28.279	1:27.570	1:27.335	8
9	19	(Brazil) Felipe Massa	Williams-Mercedes	1:28.061	1:27.016	1:27.402	9
10	1	(Germany) Sebastian Vettel	Red Bull Racing-Renault	1:27.958	1:27.052	No Time	15^{1}
11	27	(Germany) Nico Hülkenberg	Force India-Mercedes	1:28.155	1:27.685	N/A	10
12	11	(Mexico) Sergio Pérez	Force India-Mercedes	1:28.469	1:28.002	N/A	11
13	26	(Russia) Daniil Kvyat	Toro Rosso-Renault	1:28.074	1:28.039	N/A	12
14	21	(Mexico) Esteban Gutiérrez	Sauber-Ferrari	1:28.374	1:28.280	N/A	13
15	20	(Denmark) Kevin Magnussen	McLaren-Mercedes	1:28.389	No Time	N/A	14
16	25	(France) Jean-Éric Vergne	Toro Rosso-Renault	1:28.194	No Time	N/A	21^{2}
17	99	(Germany) Adrian Sutil	Sauber-Ferrari	1:28.563	N/A	N/A	16
18	4	(United Kingdom) Max Chilton	Marussia-Ferrari	1:29.586	N/A	N/A	17
19	17	(France) Jules Bianchi	Marussia-Ferrari	1:30.177	N/A	N/A	18
20	9	(Sweden) Marcus Ericsson	Caterham-Renault	1:30.312	N/A	N/A	19
21	10	(Japan) Kamui Kobayashi	Caterham-Renault	1:30.375	N/A	N/A	20
107% time: 1:32.837
NC^{3}	13	(Venezuela) Pastor Maldonado	Lotus-Renault	No Time^{3}	N/A	N/A	22

Notes:

- **^1** – Sebastian Vettel was given a five place grid penalty for an unscheduled gearbox change after qualifying.
- **^2** – Jean-Éric Vergne was given a ten place grid penalty for an unsafe pit lane release in the second practice session.
- **^3** – Pastor Maldonado failed to set a lap time during qualifying. He was allowed to participate in the race after a dispensation from the race stewards.

== Race ==
The 66-lap race took place before 91,480 spectators in the afternoon from 14:00 Central European Summer Time (UTC+02:00). Overnight rain made the track damp though it was sunny and warm before the race. The air temperature was between 21 and 23 °C (70 and 73 °F) and the track temperature from 34 to 37 °C (93 to 99 °F); conditions were forecast to remain consistent with no rain. Autosport theorised that making three-stops would be the optimal strategy but drivers stopping twice would give them better track position. Every driver, bar Vergne, began on the medium compound tyre. Hamilton made a clear start to lead the field entering the first corner. Bottas overtook Ricciardo for third and Rosberg then held him off. Grosjean in fifth locked his front wheels but blocked a pass from Räikkönen at the turn four hairpin. At turn 14, Button put his teammate Magnussen wide into a gravel trap but the latter continued after contact with Vettel. At the end of the first lap, Hamilton led Rosberg by 1.1 seconds with Bottas the same deficit adrift in third.

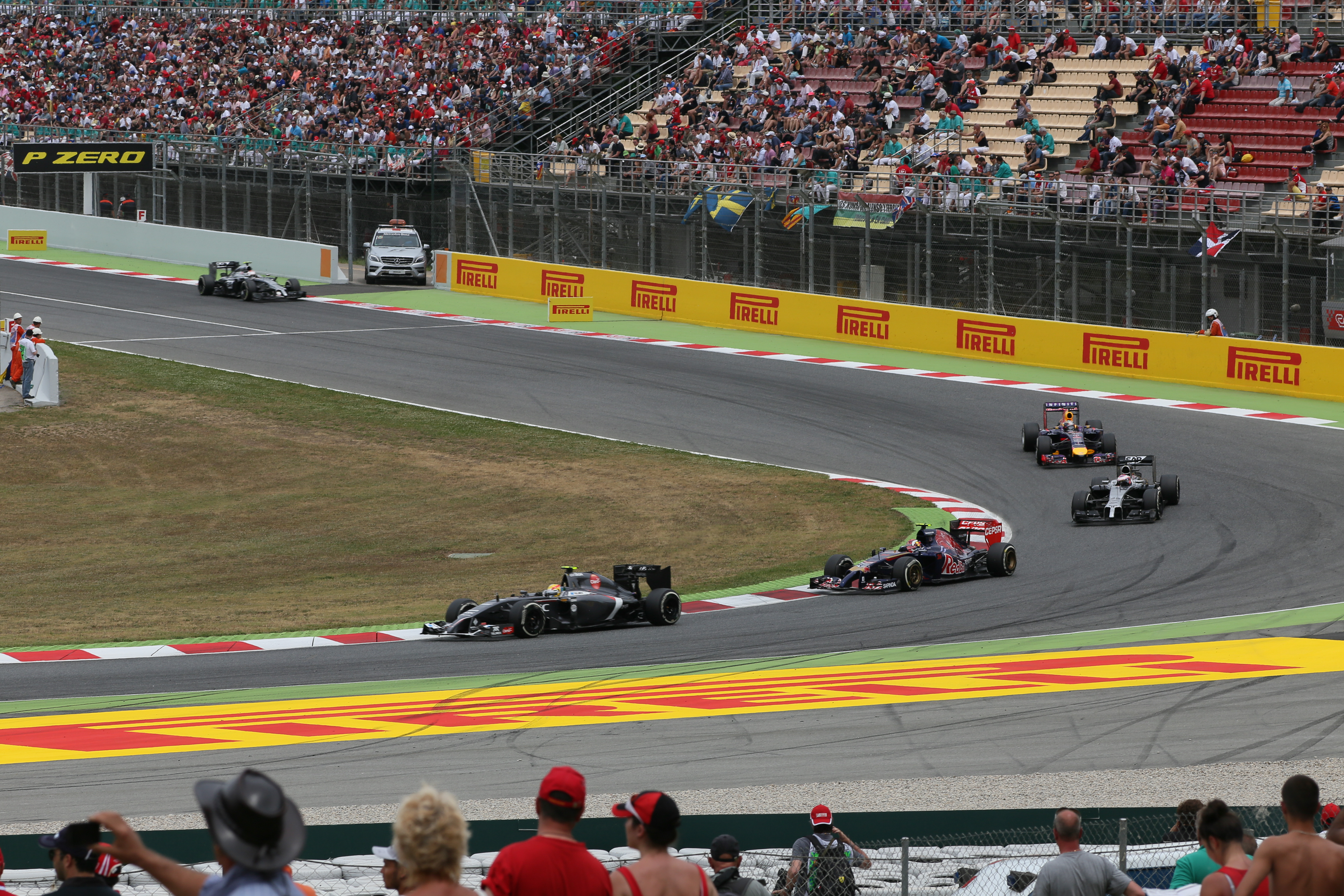
Cars circulating the track during the ffith lap of the event

Hamilton began to pull away from the rest of the field, extending the lead over his teammate Rosberg to two seconds by the start of the fourth lap, with a further five seconds covering Bottas in third and the fourth-placed Ricciardo. In the meantime, Räikkönen defended from his teammate Alonso. Maldonado and Ericsson made contact. On lap six, Red Bull advised Ricciardo to drop back from Bottas so that he did not put additional stress on his tyres by driving in the aerodynamic turbulence created by the airflow of other cars for a long period of time. He used DRS and turned right to attempt to pass Bottas into turn one on the next lap. Bottas had enough momentum to hold third position. Ricciardo radioed Red Bull on lap eight he had decided that their suggestion was correct and fell back from Bottas. On lap nine, the stewards informed the Lotus team that Maldonado incurred a five-second stop-and-go penalty for his contact with Ericsson on lap three and had to serve it at his first pit stop.

Button ran wide on lap 12 and held off Vettel, who was called by Red Bull into the pit lane for the first of three pit stops at the end of the lap. He had the hard compound tyres installed onto his car and emerged in 21st, behind Chilton and ahead of Ericsson with less congestion. Ricciardo entered the pit lane for the medium compound tyres at the conclusion of lap 14 in an attempt to pass Bottas and stay on a two-stop strategy. Williams elected not to bring Bottas into the pit lane in response and kept him on track to keep a consistent pace without sustaining rear tyre degradation. On the 16th lap, Kobayashi blocked Vettel from passing him before turn nine for 19th. Vettel tried again at the following corner and was successful this time round. After Massa had made his pit stop the lap before, Alonso asked Ferrari to bring him into the pit lane as his rear tyres were worn after the battle with his teammate Räikkönen. The team refused until lap 16 since there were no significant gaps in traffic. That meant Räikkönen entered the pit lane a lap later than Alonso and remained narrowly ahead – partly because Alonso was baulked by Sutil.

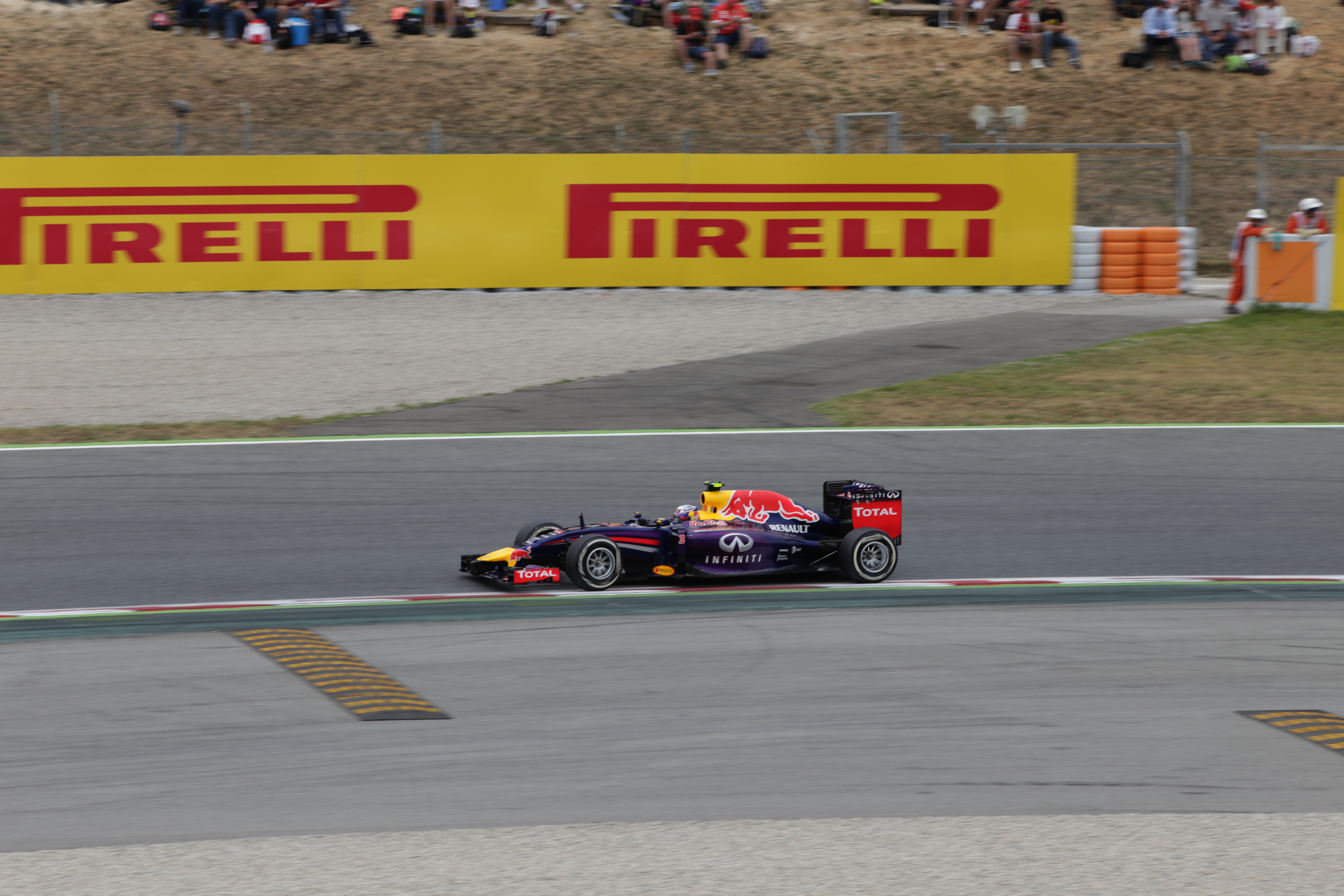
Daniel Ricciardo finished in third to take the first podium of his career.

Rosberg lowered the deficit to Hamilton to 1.6 seconds by the time of his teammate's first pit stop at the end of lap 18 for the medium compound tyres and a minor front wing angle adjustment. Ricciardo drew to within 12 seconds of Bottas, and when the latter made his first stop two laps later, Ricciardo moved past Bottas, who rejoined the track narrowly ahead of Grosjean. Rosberg was confused when his engineer Tony Ross called him into the pit lane at the end of lap 21 for the hard compound tyres because he believed he would have a new set of medium compound tyres. He rejoined almost four seconds behind his teammate Hamilton, who was told by radio to increase the gap over the next 20 laps. On lap 24, Räikkönen attempted to pass Grosjean on the right into the first corner for fifth but he ran deep and Grosjean kept the place. He tried again into the same turn on the next lap and passed Grosjean, whose motor–generator unit kinetic partially failed. On lap 25, Vergne retired in the pit lane with a broken exhaust. During the same lap, Grosjean locked his tyres into turn ten and allowed Alonso to challenge him. Alonso used DRS to pass Grosjean on the inside for sixth before turn one on lap 26.

At the front, Hamilton struggled with first over- then understeer on his car. Massa made his second pit stop for the hard compound tyres on lap 28, meaning Vettel's aerodynamics could not be affected by other's cars negatively. Vettel caught Grosjean by lap 32 but entered the pit lane for his second pit stop to switch onto the medium compound tyres because he believed he could not pass the latter on the track. He rejoined the race in 14th. Two laps later, a front-left brake failure put Kobayashi onto the turn one run-off area but avoided hitting the wall. He entered the pit lane to retire from the race. Ferrari brought Alonso into the pit lane on the 35th lap in response to Vettel's earlier pit stop. He emerged in tenth, just ahead of Massa. Alonso overtook Magnussen into turn one with DRS for ninth on lap 36 and Vettel passed Massa for 11th on the next lap. On lap 40, Massa used DRS to pass Magnussen for tenth before the first turn.

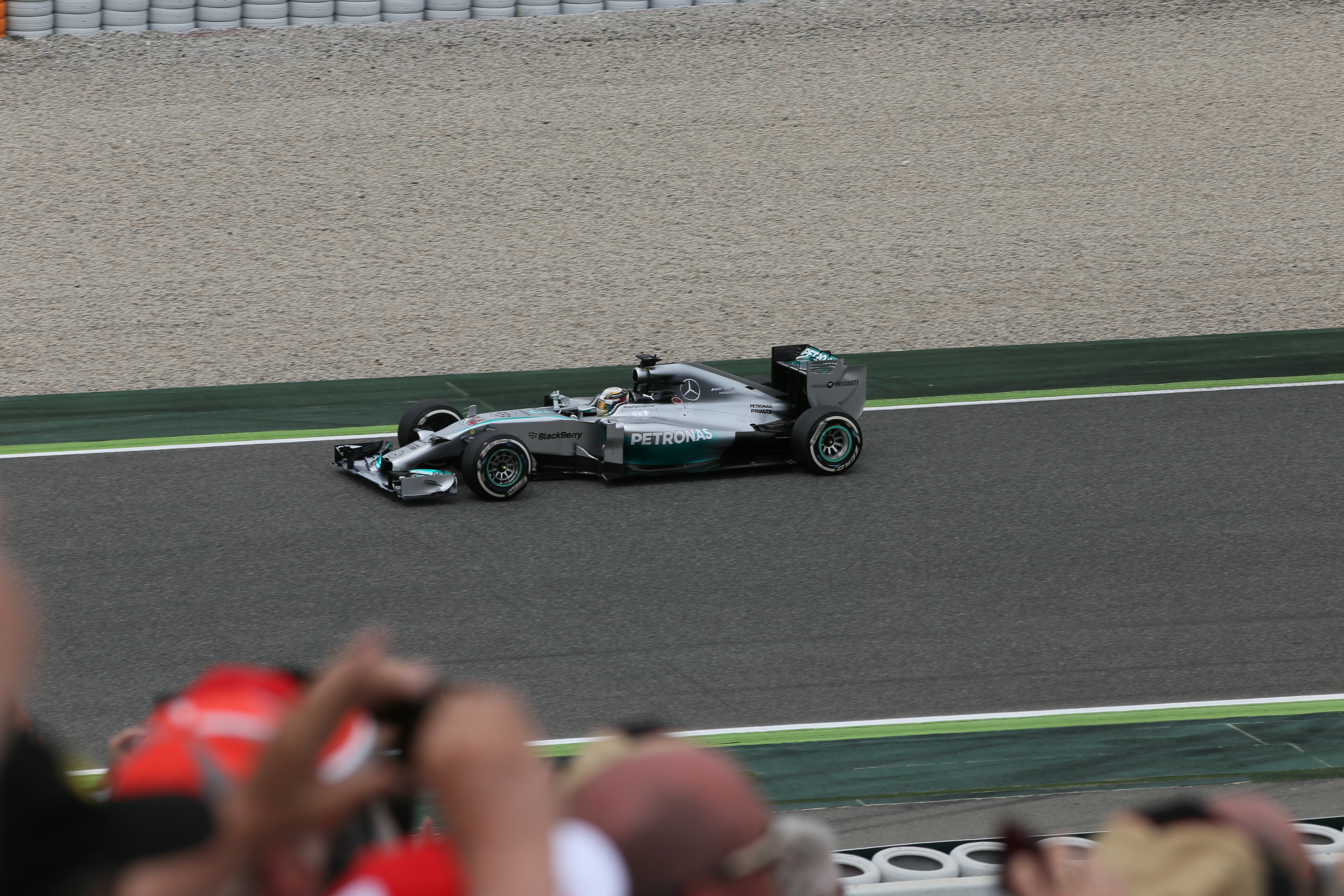
Lewis Hamilton started from pole position and held off his teammate Nico Rosberg to claim his fourth successive win of the season and the 26th of his career.

At the end of lap 42, Hamilton ignored an instruction from Mercedes to enter the pit lane and asked for further adjustments to his front wing to counter a possible oversteer with a new set of tyres. He entered the pit lane on the following lap for the hard compound tyres but the stop was problematic: Hamilton's pit crew had difficulty installing the right-rear wheel and he was stationary for 4.3 seconds. Rosberg led for two laps before his second pit stop for the medium compound tyres on the 45th lap. He began gaining on his teammate Hamilton, who questioned the decision to bring him into the pit lane before Rosberg. On lap 49, Pérez passed his teammate Hülkenberg for ninth. Three laps later, Vettel entered the pit lane for his second pit stop. Alonso responded by making a pit stop for the medium-compound tyres a lap later. As Alonso exited the pit lane, Vettel overtook him on the outside for sixth into turn one. An oversteer for Räikkönen leaving turn nine slowed him on the back straight and allowed Vettel to pass him braking at the turn ten hairpin for fifth.

Rosberg was less than a second behind his teammate Hamilton by lap 59 and used DRS. However, Hamilton was within a second of Button entering the final corner and used DRS to cancel out Rosberg's pace. It was around this point Hamilton switched to higher-powered engine mode forbidden for use by Mercedes to improve his performance and keep Rosberg behind. As Rosberg returned to DRS range on lap 62, Alonso overtook his teammate Räikkönen between turns three and four for sixth after a short duel. Later that lap, Vettel passed Bottas on the outside for fourth at the turn ten hairpin. Hamilton locked his wheels braking for turn ten and ran wide on lap 65, allowing his teammate Rosberg to attempt an unsuccessful pass. He led Rosberg by six-tenths of a second on the final lap, who attempted a pass with DRS but locked his tyres at turn ten, allowing Hamilton to take his fourth win in succession in 2014 and the 26th of his career. Ricciardo came third for his first career podium finish and his teammate Vettel was fourth. (Note: Ricciardo finished second at the season-opening Australian Grand Prix but he was later disqualified for a fuel infringement.) Bottas came fifth and Alonso and Räikkönen were sixth and seventh. Grosjean earned Lotus' first championship points of the season in eighth. Pérez and Hülkenberg completed the top ten. The final finishers were Button, Magnussen, Massa, Kvyat, Maldonado, Gutiérrez, Sutil, Bianchi, Chilton and Ericsson.

=== Post-race ===
At the podium interviews, conducted by former team owner Eddie Jordan, Hamilton was delighted to win for the first time in Spain and said he had not envisioned Mercedes having a large speed advantage over the Red Bull team. Rosberg believed he need one more lap to pass Hamilton and was slightly disappointed to finish second, saying "I wasn't close enough to give it a go there but next lap I would have. But unfortunately that was it." Third-placed Ricciardo stated Red Bull were aware they could not equal Mercedes' performance and that the team focused on tyre conservation. In the subsequent press conference, Hamilton said Mercedes' form of five victories in succession meant the team appeared stronger for the foreseeable future and was certain the journalists who criticised his move to the manufacturer in 2013 had changed their views. Rosberg said there was a large amount of positive aspects to take forward from the race and was motivated to extract additional pace to beat Hamilton. Ricciardo said that a loss of traction at the start dropped him behind Bottas but was satisfied to finish third.

Bernie Ecclestone, the owner of Formula One's commercial rights, was visited by race promoters from 17 different countries in Barcelona. They voiced their concerns over declining attendance figures because of Mercedes' five successive victories and "maintaining the unique feeling of Formula One". Red Bull team principal Christian Horner said of the situation, "We have a choice – we either pack up and go home or we fight. Obviously, maximum points every weekend is putting [Mercedes] in a very strong position, but we are going to push like hell all the way to the last race." In response, Mercedes team principal Toto Wolff said the marque was aware of potential criticism for a dominant team and stated his belief that an intra-team battle would help maintain interest in Formula One, "We owe this to the fans, we owe to the sport and what we owe to the brand Mercedes. This is our philosophy straight from the beginning with all the risks you have by letting them race."

For switching to an engine mode not allowed for use by Mercedes, Hamilton was required by senior personnel to apologise to the team. It was the second time in the season that a Mercedes driver used a forbidden engine setting after Rosberg did so at the Bahrain Grand Prix two races earlier. Wolff banned both drivers from selecting their own engine settings starting from the Monaco Grand Prix. Bottas said his fifth-place finish was "a step forward" with the updates to his car and believed Williams had to be satisfied with the result and felt they were the third fastest team, "So I really feel that we need to be happy, you always want more and will look to see if there is anything we can do better in the future, but from my side I think the race was one of my best – good start, in the beginning I kept Ricciardo behind even though he was quicker and the Mercedes engine helped with that and yeah, no mistakes on my side." Button said his 11th-place finish, which resulted in McLaren failing to score any points in three races for the first time since 2009 and the first for him since 2008, was down to a slow start, an incorrect pit stop strategy and a speed disadvantage preventing the team from scoring a point.

Räikkönen questioned over the radio the decision to change his strategy on the way back to the pit lane after the race due to his belief Alonso was being prioritised over him. He said his choice of wording was to clarify the situation and attempted to make the problem appear less important, "Obviously there was not much between it. We still finished far away from the others. It did not make much difference to the result." Alonso spoke of his insistence that Ferrari sought to finish ahead of Vettel and not win against his teammate, "They said Vettel was on three so if we stopped now, we covered him. And I said 'we do it'. I tried to protect the position from Vettel and it was not possible. The intention was just to keep Vettel behind once we'd changed strategy. We didn't manage it and it was a shame." For the collision between Maldonado and Ericsson, Maldonado incurred one penalty point on his super licence, his fourth of the season.

The race result left Hamilton with 100 championship points and the World Drivers' Championship lead for the first time in his career since 2012. His teammate Rosberg fell to second and Alonso remained in third. Vettel moved to fourth and his teammate Ricciardo advanced from sixth to fifth. In the World Constructors' Championship, Mercedes increased their lead over the second-placed Red Bull to 114 championship points. Ferrari passed Force India for third and Williams progressed to fifth with 14 races left in the season.

=== Race classification ===
Drivers who scored championship points are denoted in bold.

Pos.	No.	Driver	Constructor	Laps	Time/Retired	Grid	Points
1	44	(United Kingdom) **Lewis Hamilton**	**Mercedes**	66	1:41:05.155	1	25
2	6	(Germany) **Nico Rosberg**	**Mercedes**	66	+0.636	2	18
3	3	(Australia) **Daniel Ricciardo**	**Red Bull Racing-Renault**	66	+49.014	3	15
4	1	(Germany) **Sebastian Vettel**	**Red Bull Racing-Renault**	66	+1:16.702	15	12
5	77	(Finland) **Valtteri Bottas**	**Williams-Mercedes**	66	+1:19.293	4	10
6	14	(Spain) **Fernando Alonso**	**Ferrari**	66	+1:27.743	7	8
7	7	(Finland) **Kimi Räikkönen**	**Ferrari**	65	+1 Lap	6	6
8	8	(France) **Romain Grosjean**	**Lotus-Renault**	65	+1 Lap	5	4
9	11	(Mexico) **Sergio Pérez**	**Force India-Mercedes**	65	+1 Lap	11	2
10	27	(Germany) **Nico Hülkenberg**	**Force India-Mercedes**	65	+1 Lap	10	1
11	22	(United Kingdom) Jenson Button	McLaren-Mercedes	65	+1 Lap	8	
12	20	(Denmark) Kevin Magnussen	McLaren-Mercedes	65	+1 Lap	14	
13	19	(Brazil) Felipe Massa	Williams-Mercedes	65	+1 Lap	9	
14	26	(Russia) Daniil Kvyat	Toro Rosso-Renault	65	+1 Lap	12	
15	13	(Venezuela) Pastor Maldonado	Lotus-Renault	65	+1 Lap	22	
16	21	(Mexico) Esteban Gutiérrez	Sauber-Ferrari	65	+1 Lap	13	
17	99	(Germany) Adrian Sutil	Sauber-Ferrari	65	+1 Lap	16	
18	17	(France) Jules Bianchi	Marussia-Ferrari	64	+2 Laps	18	
19	4	(United Kingdom) Max Chilton	Marussia-Ferrari	64	+2 Laps	17	
20	9	(Sweden) Marcus Ericsson	Caterham-Renault	64	+2 Laps	19	
Ret	10	(Japan) Kamui Kobayashi	Caterham-Renault	34	Brakes	20	
Ret	25	(France) Jean-Éric Vergne	Toro Rosso-Renault	24	Exhaust	21	

== Championship standings after the race ==
Drivers' Championship standings

+/–	Pos.	Driver	Points
1	1	(United Kingdom) Lewis Hamilton	100
1	2	(Germany) Nico Rosberg	97
	3	(Spain) Fernando Alonso	49
1	4	(Germany) Sebastian Vettel	45
1	5	(Australia) Daniel Ricciardo	39

Constructors' Championship standings

+/–	Pos.	Constructor	Points
	1	(Germany) Mercedes	197
	2	(Austria) Red Bull Racing-Renault	84
1	3	(Italy) Ferrari	66
1	4	Force India-Mercedes	57
1	5	(United Kingdom) Williams-Mercedes	46
Sources:

- Note: Only the top five positions are included for both sets of standings.

== See also ==
- 2014 Catalunya GP2 Series round
- 2014 Catalunya GP3 Series round

== Footnotes and references ==
=== References ===
Previous race: 2014 Chinese Grand Prix	FIA Formula One World Championship; 2014 season	Next race: 2014 Monaco Grand Prix
Previous race: 2013 Spanish Grand Prix	Spanish Grand Prix	Next race: 2015 Spanish Grand Prix
