= Sauber C33 =

2014 Formula One racing car

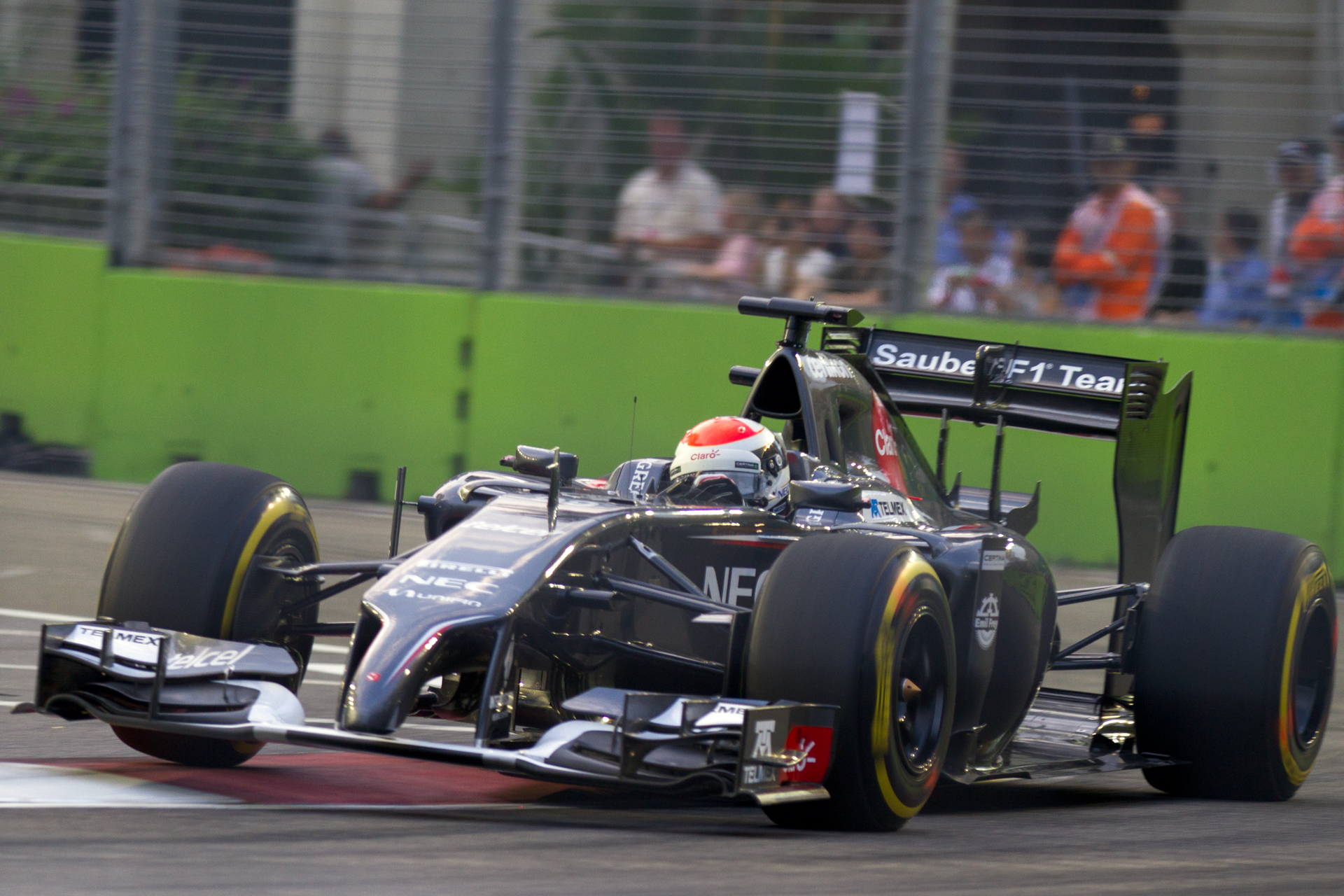
- Adrian Sutil driving the C33 at the Singapore Grand Prix
- Category: Formula One
- Constructor: Sauber
- Designers: Eric Gandelin (Chief Designer); Ben Waterhouse (Head of Vehicle Performance); Willem Toet (Head of Aerodynamics); Seamus Mullarkey (Head of Aerodynamic Research); Mariano Alperin (Head of Aerodynamic Development)
- Predecessor: Sauber C32
- Successor: Sauber C34

Technical specifications
- Chassis: Carbon-fibre monocoque
- Suspension (front): Upper and lower wishbones, inboard springs and dampers activated by pushrods
- Suspension (rear): Upper and lower wishbones, inboard springs and dampers activated by pullrods
- Engine: Ferrari 059/3 1.6 L (98 cu in) V6, turbo
- Transmission: Ferrari 8-speed gearbox quick-shift carbon gearbox, longitudinally mounted, carbon-fibre clutch
- Weight: 691 kg (1,523.4 lb)
- Tyres: Pirelli P Zero (dry), Cinturato (wet)

Competition history
- Notable entrants: Sauber F1 Team
- Notable drivers: 21. (Mexico) Esteban Gutiérrez; 99. (Germany) Adrian Sutil
- Debut: 2014 Australian Grand Prix
- Last event: 2014 Abu Dhabi Grand Prix
Races	Wins	Podiums	Poles	F/Laps
19	0	0	0	0

The Sauber C33 is a Formula One racing car designed by Sauber to compete in the 2014 Formula One season. It was driven by Esteban Gutiérrez and Adrian Sutil, who joined the team after Nico Hülkenberg returned to Force India. The C33 was designed to use Ferrari's new 1.6-litre V6 turbocharged engine, the 059/3.

The chassis was designed by Eric Gandelin, Ben Waterhouse and Willem Toet with the car being powered with a customer Ferrari powertrain.

== Season summary ==
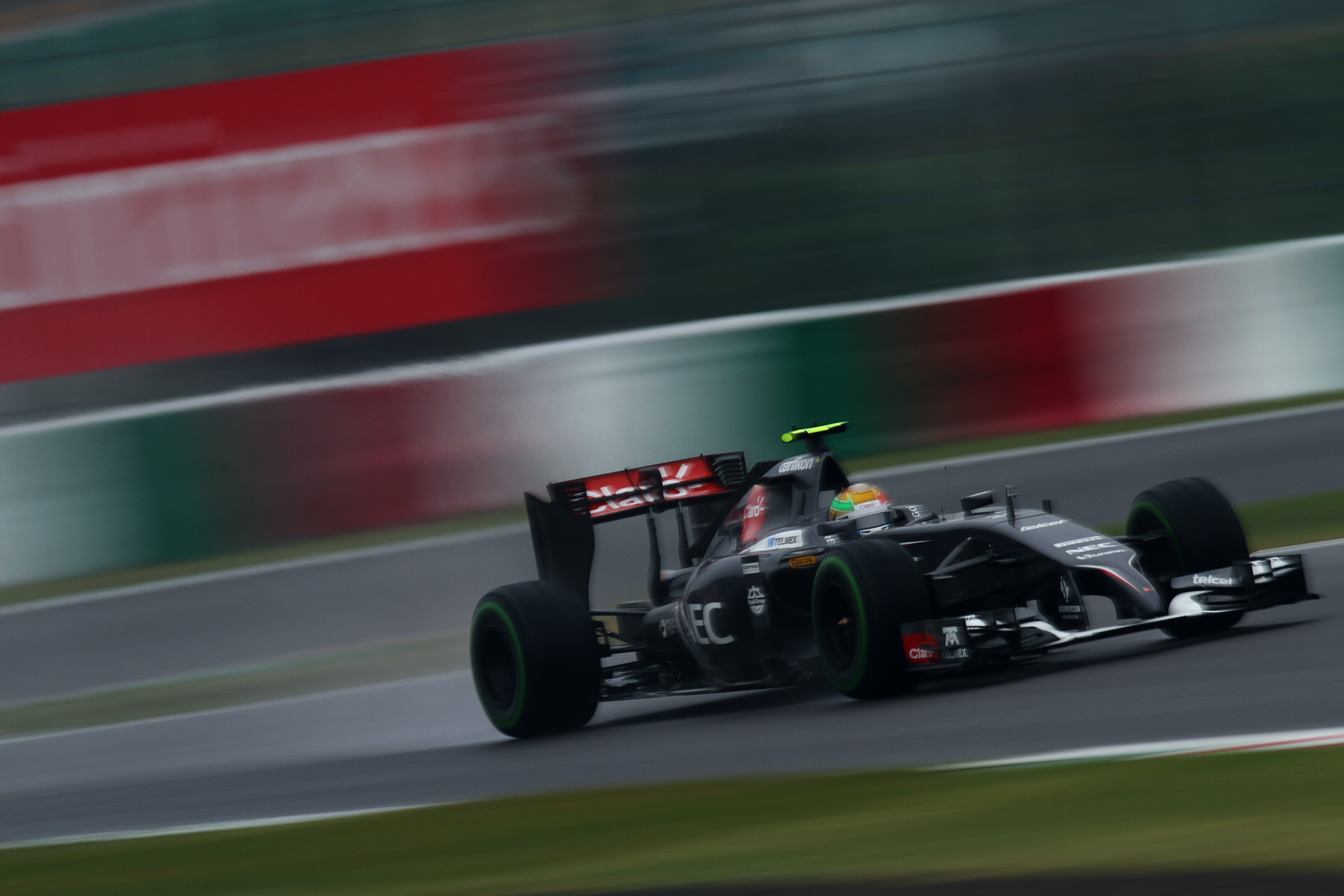
Esteban Gutiérrez driving the C33 during the Japanese Grand Prix

The car was plagued by weight issues early in the season, to the point that, to compensate for this, a tall Sutil (who, relatively speaking, was one of the heaviest drivers in the field) did not eat for two days in a desperate attempt to remain competitive.

From the very first part of the season, the car proved uncompetitive, leaving Sutil and Gutiérrez at the back of the field. In the opening race in Australia, both drivers managed to reach the finish line, though outside the points and ahead only of Max Chilton’s Marussia. The five Grands Prix that followed were even worse: only in Spain did both C33s take the chequered flag, while in the other races, Sutil and Gutiérrez were forced to retire several times due to both mechanical issues and accidents. In Monaco, Gutiérrez had a chance to score points, climbing as high as eighth place before crashing out 19 laps from the end. In that same race, Jules Bianchi scored points for his Marussia team, pushing Sauber down to tenth place in the Constructors' Championship.

For the remainder of the season, neither Sutil nor Gutiérrez was able to contend for points. Their best result was an eleventh-place finish for Sutil in Hungary a repeat of the result the German driver had achieved in the season opener. At the United States Grand Prix, Sutil managed to qualify in the top ten for the first time, but he was forced to retire just a few corners into the race following a collision with Sergio Pérez.

Ultimately, the C33 had the unfortunate distinction of being the least competitive Sauber ever built, as Sauber failed to score points for the first time in their history in 2014. In addition, due to the financial status of the team, both drivers were dropped at the end of the season to make way for a new line up of Marcus Ericsson and Felipe Nasr.

== Sponsorship and livery ==
The C33 was painted dark gray. Red colour accents were provided by the sponsor Claro a brand name used in several Latin American countries for mobile networks operated by América Móvil. In addition, the logos of NEC, Telmex, and Oerlikon appeared on the C33.

The José Cuervo ad was for Cuervo Tequila except for Bahrain and Abu Dhabi, where their Cholula Hot Sauce replaced the drink because of prohibitions on alcohol advertising.

== Complete Formula One results ==
(key)

Year	Entrant	Engine	Tyres	Drivers	1	2	3	4	5	6	7	8	9	10	11	12	13	14	15	16	17	18	19	Pts	WCC
2014	Sauber F1 Team	Ferrari 059/3	P		AUS	MAL	BHR	CHN	ESP	MON	CAN	AUT	GBR	GER	HUN	BEL	ITA	SIN	JPN	RUS	USA	BRA	ABU‡	0	10th
2014	Sauber F1 Team	Ferrari 059/3	P	(Mexico) Esteban Gutiérrez	12	Ret	Ret	16	16	Ret	14†	19	Ret	14	Ret	15	20	Ret	13	15	14	14	15	0	10th
2014	Sauber F1 Team	Ferrari 059/3	P	(Germany) Adrian Sutil	11	Ret	Ret	Ret	17	Ret	13	13	13	Ret	11	14	15	Ret	21†	16	Ret	16	16	0	10th

† — Driver failed to finish the race, but was classified as they had completed greater than 90% of the race distance.
‡ — Teams and drivers scored double points at the Abu Dhabi Grand Prix.
