= Tony Ross (engineer) =

British motorsports engineer

- Born: Anthony Ross; 19 May 1966 (age 59)
- Citizenship: British
- Occupation: Formula One race engineer
- Employer(s): Williams Racing, Mercedes-AMG Petronas F1

Anthony Ross (born 19 May 1966) is a former British Formula One engineer. He served as a race engineer for more than two decades and is best known for his partnership with Nico Rosberg which culminated in winning the 2016 world championship.

== Career ==
Ross graduated from the University of Bristol with a masters in mechanical engineering. He began his motorsport career in 1988 as a design and development engineer at Rover and Land Rover, working on powertrain systems and special engineering programmes. In 1995, he moved into touring car racing as a Design and Liaison Engineer with Nissan Motorsports Europe.

He joined Williams Racing in 1997 to work on the team's sportscar partnership with BMW as a Design & Test Engineer, contributing to the development programme that ultimately won the 1999 24 Hours of Le Mans. Ross moved into Williams’ Formula One team in 1999 as a test engineer before progressing to trackside engineering roles.

Ross became Race Engineer to Juan Pablo Montoya from 2002 to 2004, supporting the Colombian across multiple race wins and a close title fight in 2003. He then engineered Nick Heidfeld in 2005, before working with rookie Nico Rosberg for 2006. He worked with the German in his entire stint with Williams, from 2006 to 2009, before engineering Rubens Barrichello after the German departed for 2010.

Ross joined Mercedes in 2011, reuniting with Nico Rosberg as his race engineer. He remained in the role throughout the team's rise to dominance in the hybrid era, culminating in supporting Rosberg with winning the 2016 Formula One World Championship. In 2017 and 2018, Ross served as race engineer to Valtteri Bottas, supporting the Finn's first two seasons with Mercedes.

In 2018, Ross transitioned to Mercedes-EQ Formula E Team as Chief Engineer, leading race operations, simulator programmes, and trackside performance engineering. During this time, the team won back-to-back Drivers’ and Teams’ Championships in 2020–21 and 2021–22.
