= 2014 Monaco Grand Prix =

6th round of the 2014 Formula One World Championship

Race 6 of 19 in the 2014 Formula One World Championship
← Previous race	Next race →
- Circuit de Monaco

Race details
- Date: 25 May 2014
- Official name: Formula 1 Grand Prix de Monaco 2014
- Location: Circuit de Monaco, Monte Carlo, Monaco
- Course: Street circuit
- Course length: 3.340 km (2.075 miles)
- Distance: 78 laps, 260.520 km (161.880 miles)
- Weather: Overcast, Air: 20 to 21 °C (68 to 70 °F), Track: 28 to 30 °C (82 to 86 °F).

Pole position
Driver	(Germany) Nico Rosberg	Mercedes
- Time: 1:15.989

Fastest lap
Driver	(Finland) Kimi Räikkönen	Ferrari
- Time: 1:18.479 on lap 75

Podium
First	(Germany) Nico Rosberg	Mercedes
Second	(United Kingdom) Lewis Hamilton	Mercedes
Third	(Australia) Daniel Ricciardo	Red Bull Racing-Renault

The 2014 Monaco Grand Prix (formally the Formula 1 Grand Prix de Monaco 2014) was a Formula One motor race held on 25 May at the Circuit de Monaco in Monte Carlo. It was the sixth race of the 2014 Formula One World Championship and the 61st Monaco Grand Prix as part of the series. Mercedes driver Nico Rosberg won the 78-lap race from pole position. His teammate Lewis Hamilton finished second and Red Bull Racing driver Daniel Ricciardo was third. It was Rosberg's second victory of the season and the fifth of his career.

Before the race, Hamilton led the World Drivers' Championship and Mercedes led the World Constructors' Championship. Rosberg won the pole position by posting the fastest lap in qualifying under controversial circumstances and maintained the lead at the start. The race was neutralised on the first lap with the safety car following an accident between Force India's Sergio Pérez and McLaren's Jenson Button, and when it was restarted Rosberg kept the lead. Adrian Sutil further caused disruption when he crashed his Sauber car on lap 24 and Rosberg kept the lead after the field made pit stops. He maintained a varying advantage over Hamilton as the two pulled away from other drivers. Rosberg was instructed to conserve fuel while Hamilton was told he did not need to do so. Hamilton later got dirt in his eye in the final laps, allowing Rosberg to pull away and win the race.

The result saw Rosberg regain the lead of the World Drivers' Championship by four championship points over Hamilton. Fernando Alonso remained in third while Ricciardo's third-place finish moved him past teammate Sebastian Vettel. Mercedes further increased their lead in the World Constructors' Championship to 141 championship points ahead of Red Bull while Ferrari maintained third position. Force India kept fourth and McLaren overtook Williams for fifth with 13 races left in the season.

== Background ==
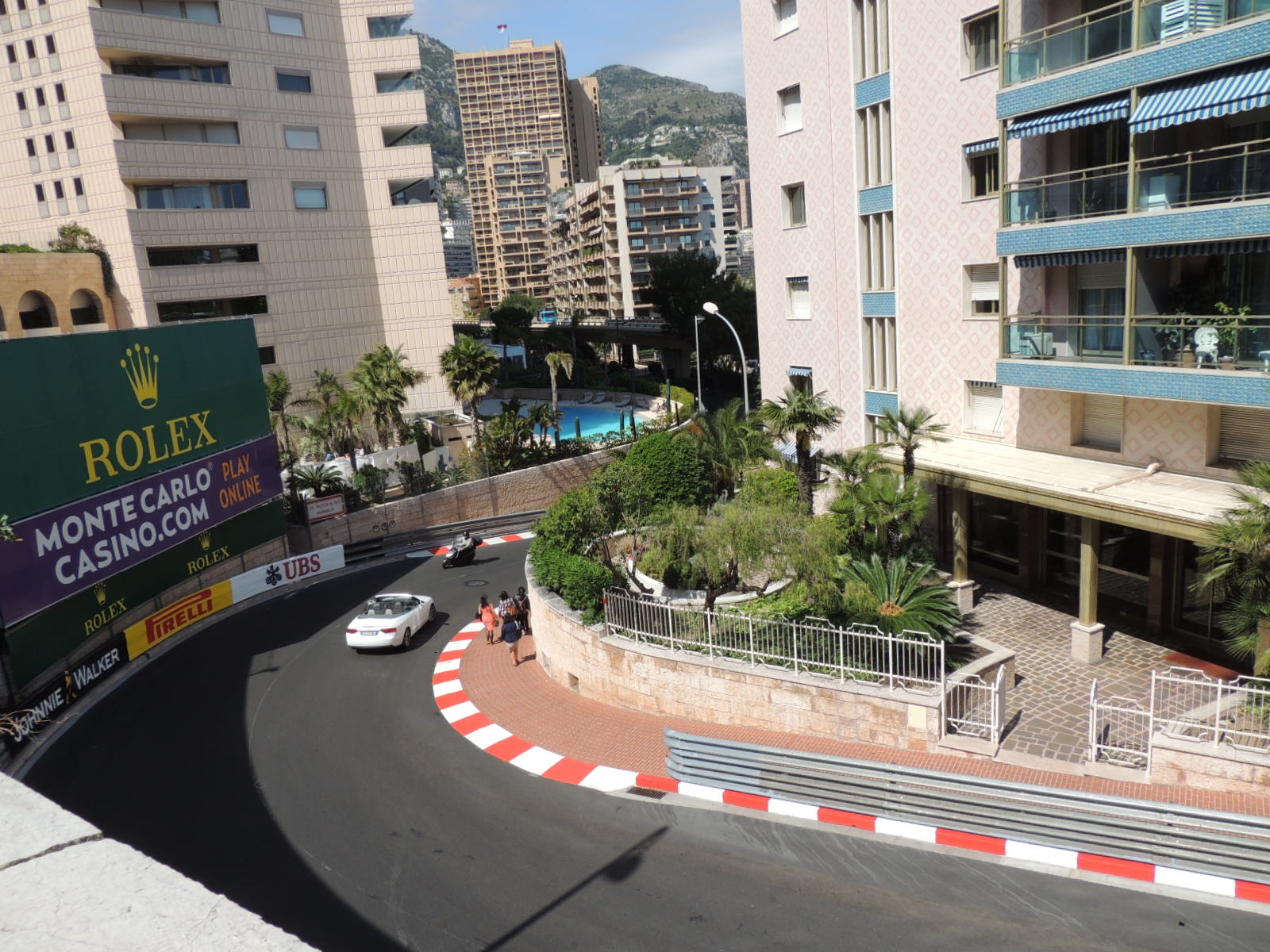
The Circuit de Monaco being prepared for the race

The 2014 Monaco Grand Prix was the sixth of the 19 rounds in the 2014 Formula One World Championship, and the 61st running of the race as part of the series. It was held on 25 May 2014 at the 3.340 km (2.075 mi) 19-turn Circuit de Monaco in Monte Carlo. It was officially called the Formula 1 Grand Prix de Monaco 2014. Tyre supplier Pirelli brought the red-banded super soft and yellow-banded soft dry compound tyres to the race. The drag reduction system (DRS) had one activation zone for the race which was on the straight linking the final and first turns. For the Grand Prix, a total of 11 teams (each representing a different constructor) entered two race drivers each.

Before the race Mercedes driver Lewis Hamilton led the World Drivers' Championship with 100 championship points, ahead of teammate Nico Rosberg in second and Fernando Alonso in third. Sebastian Vettel was fourth on 45 championship points, seven ahead of teammate Daniel Ricciardo in fifth. Mercedes led the World Constructors' Championship with 197 championship points, and Red Bull were second on 84 championship points. Ferrari (66 championship points) and Force India (57) were third and fourth and Williams were fifth on 46 championship points.

The tension between the two Mercedes teammates was high before the weekend when Hamilton was found to have altered his car settings in the final laps of the Spanish Grand Prix, using a forbidden higher-powered engine setting to keep Rosberg behind. Rosberg was found to have done the same while battling Hamilton at the end of the Bahrain Grand Prix. Despite losing the lead of the Drivers' Championship to teammate Hamilton in Spain, Rosberg stated he would not be changing his approach and was not heavily focused on the title but expected it to remain tight. Hamilton reckoned his increased comfort with the F1 W05 Hybrid car would put Rosberg under pressure in Monaco, saying it was a track where he performed well and wanted Ferrari and Red Bull to battle him for the victory.

The circuit was altered following the 2013 race. The track was resurfaced from the exit of Casino corner until the entry to the tunnel with small areas before the Novelle chicane and Tabac undergoing a similar change. The pit lane barrier and the debris fencing was renewed and the turn 12 TecPro energy absorbing barrier was made more efficiently constrained. Work on the track was carried out at night to minimise roadside traffic disruption. Jenson Button for McLaren predicted the changes would create a situation similar to the 2012 United States Grand Prix where grip was low and felt the soft compound tyres would be difficult to get working properly. Pérez said the experience around Monaco would be "difficult" but that "It will be a new Monaco – very, very interesting". Alonso stated the event would be "a question mark for everybody" and that Formula One needed to see the team that would adapt their car better for Monaco.

== Practice ==
There were three practice sessions held before the race on Sunday, two 90-minute practice sessions on Thursday and a third one-hour session on Saturday. Hamilton was fastest in the first practice session, which took place in dry weather, with a lap of 1:18.271, 0.032 seconds faster than teammate Rosberg in second. The two Red Bull cars were third and fifth with Ricciardo ahead of Vettel; they were separated by Alonso's Ferrari. Ricciardo was set to go faster but slower traffic delayed him. Kimi Räikkönen, Valtteri Bottas, Sergio Pérez, Kevin Magnussen and Nico Hülkenberg rounded out the session's top-ten drivers. Max Chilton stranded his Marussia after spinning at Mirabeau corner early in the session, ending his session early. Esteban Gutiérrez went straight on at Sainte Dévote corner. Alonso locked his left front tyre at Mirabeau corner but avoided damaging his car. His teammate Räikkönen spun at Sainte Dévote corner but continued.

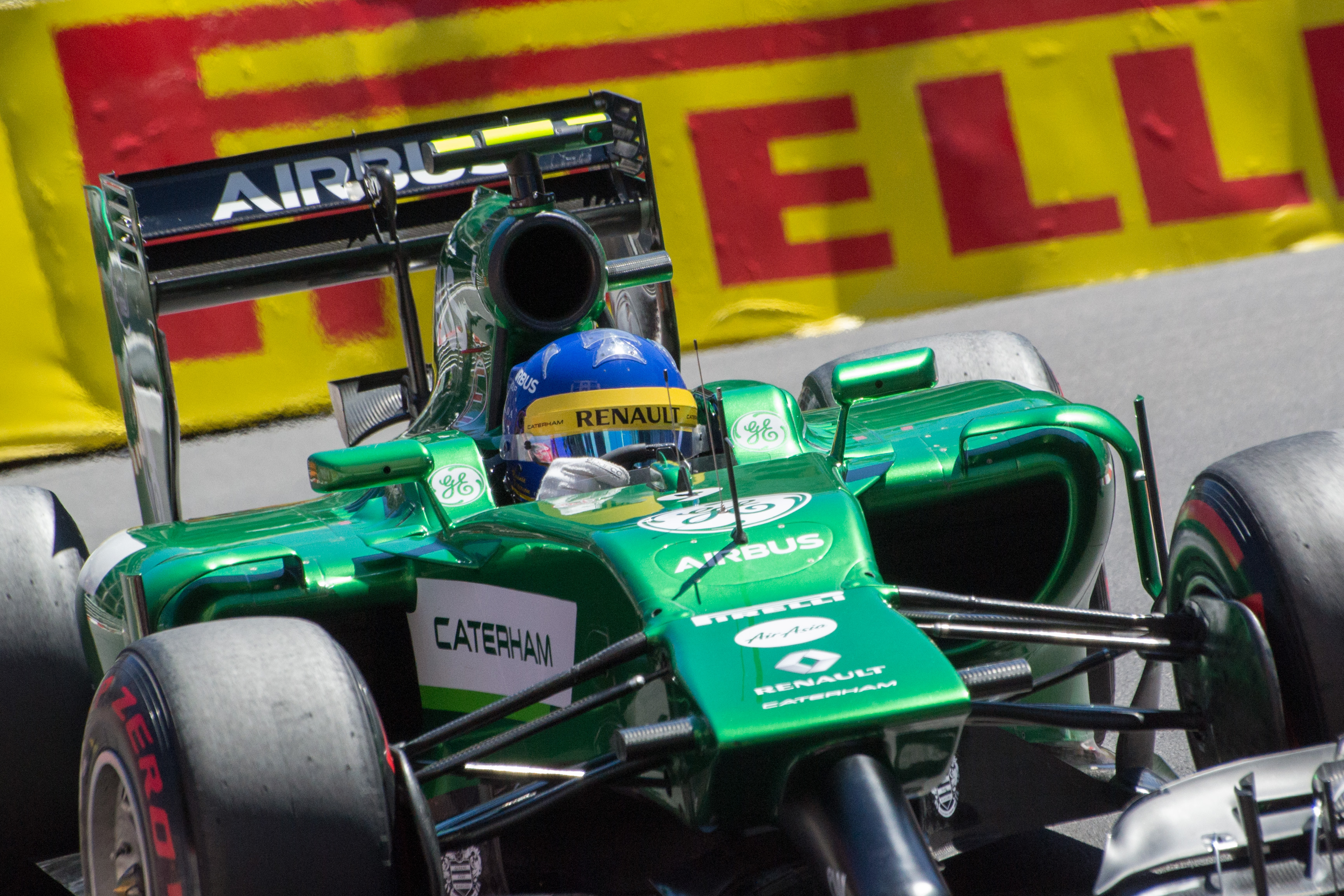
Marcus Ericsson twice went off the track in practice and was penalised for colliding with Felipe Massa in qualifying.

Clouds moved into Monaco in the first session and a heavy hailstorm fell but ended before the second session began. The track was saturated with water and teams opted to keep their drivers in their garages for 45 minutes. Drivers first drove on the intermediate tyres although the surface dried quickly. They used dry slick tyres in the final ten minutes which saw Alonso lap fastest with at 1:18.482, keeping Hamilton fastest overall for Thursday. Alonso was four-tenths of a second quicker than Hamilton in second. Vettel, Jean-Éric Vergne. Bottas, Pérez, Hülkenberg, Button, Ricciardo and Felipe Massa followed in the top ten. Marcus Ericsson hit the barriers leaving Portier corner but reversed away from the area and drove his damaged car to the pit lane.

After taking Friday off—a feature unique to the Monaco Grand Prix— (Note: The Friday of the Monaco Grand Prix is designated as a rest day as the event was traditionally linked to Ascension Day and the roads could re-open for the day.) the drivers returned to action on Saturday in clear weather. All of the leading drivers had trouble getting clear air as they fought for clear space around the narrow circuit which had been made worse by them taking longer than usual to get optimum tyre temperature. Despite Hamilton having difficulties with his car's handling and narrowly avoiding an accident at Tabac corner, he set the fastest lap of the weekend so far of 1:16.758, 1/2 a tenth of a second quicker than Ricciardo in second. Rosberg, Vettel, Alonso, Räikkönen, Pérez, Hülkenberg, Vergne and Daniil Kvyat were third through tenth. Vergne ran off the track at Sainte Dévote and Mirabeau corners. Ericsson went onto the Dévote run-off area and reversed to rejoin the track.

== Qualifying ==
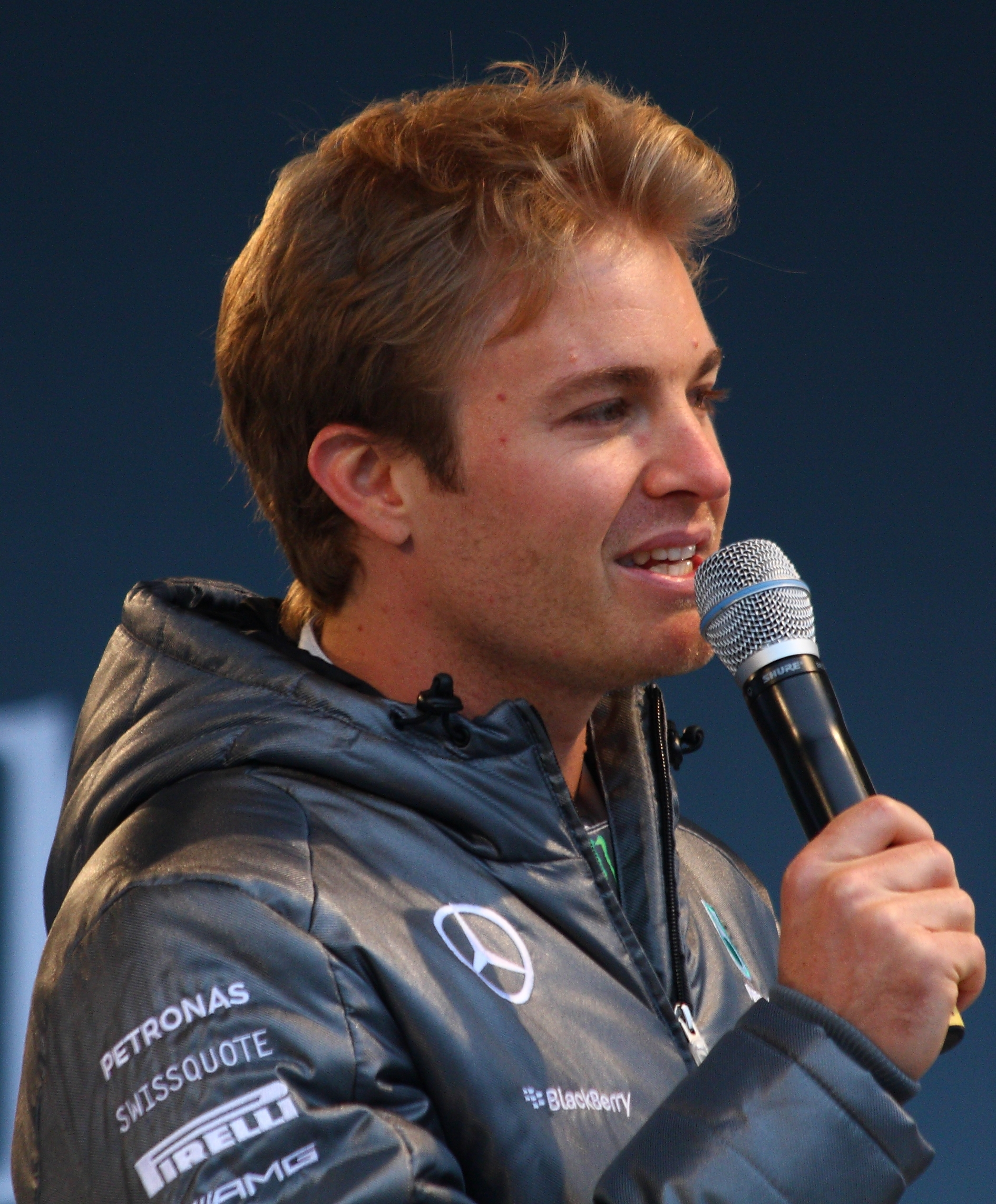
Nico Rosberg had the sixth pole position of his career despite being investigated for potentially impeding teammate Lewis Hamilton's lap.

Saturday afternoon's qualifying session was divided into three parts. The first part ran for 18 minutes, eliminating cars that finished 17th or below. The 107% rule was in effect, requiring drivers to reach a time within 107 per cent of the quickest lap to qualify. The second session lasted 15 minutes, eliminating cars that finished 11th to 16th. The final part lasted 12 minutes and determined pole position to tenth. Cars who progressed to the final session were not allowed to change tyres for the race's start, using the tyres with which they set their quickest lap times in the second session. After the final session's first runs, Rosberg had provisional pole position with a lap of 1:15.989, 0.039 seconds faster than Hamilton. During his second and final quick lap, Rosberg locked his tyres, ran deep at Mirabeau corner and had to abort his lap, before reversing back onto the track. The resulting yellow flags forced Hamilton to slow, ruining his final qualifying lap (after he had set a personal best first sector), and stopped him from challenging Rosberg's earlier time. After qualifying, the stewards investigated Rosberg under suspicion of deliberately spoiling Hamilton's lap. The stewards examined video evidence and telemetry data from Mercedes, and racing governing body, the Fédération Internationale de l'Automobile (FIA), concluded there was no evidence of wrongdoing by Rosberg. (Note: The incident drew comparisons with Michael Schumacher's blocking of Rascasse corner in qualifying for the 2006 race which prevented Alonso from improving his time.) It was Rosberg's second pole position of 2014 and the sixth of his career.

Ricciardo qualified third; he could not improve his fastest time after sliding on his final timed lap. His teammate Vettel lost the use of his energy recovery system in the first session; he ran in a different mode and the yellow flags left him fourth. The Ferrari duo of Alonso and Räikkönen were fifth and sixth; both had tyre warming problems. Although the yellow flags affected Vergne's final lap, he took seventh and his teammate Kvyat ninth after struggling with rear control and hit a barrier. He drove to the pit lane for a replacement nose cone. They were separated by Magnussen in eighth and Pérez was tenth after locking his tyres into the Novelle chicane. Hülkenberg in 11th was the fastest driver not to qualify for the final session. A Toro Rosso car delayed Button in 12th on his final lap at the Swimming Pool complex. Front tyre heating problems put Bottas 13th. Romain Grosjean and Pastor Maldonado in the two Lotus cars took 14th and 15th with Massa unable to record a lap time. Ericsson locked his rear tyres going into Mirabeau corner and glanced Massa's car heading into the turn, causing both drivers to hit the barriers. The stewards investigated the incident and Ericsson incurred two penalty points on his super licence and was required to start from the pit lane. Gutiérrez failed to progress beyond the first session, and was followed by Sauber teammate Adrian Sutil. Jules Bianchi, 19th, lost 1/2 a second in slower traffic and yellow flags. He received a five-place grid penalty, because his team changed a problematic gearbox overnight. Hence, his Marussia teammate Chilton began 19th. Kamui Kobayashi in 20th used super soft compound tyres on his first two timed laps and adjusted his front wing but could not improve.

=== Qualifying classification ===
The fastest lap in each of the three sessions is denoted in bold .

Pos.	No.	Driver	Constructor	Q1	Q2	Q3	Grid
1	6	(Germany) Nico Rosberg	Mercedes	1:17.678	1:16.465	**1:15.989**	1
2	44	(United Kingdom) Lewis Hamilton	Mercedes	1:17.823	**1:16.354**	1:16.048	2
3	3	(Australia) Daniel Ricciardo	Red Bull Racing-Renault	1:17.900	1:17.233	1:16.384	3
4	1	(Germany) Sebastian Vettel	Red Bull Racing-Renault	1:18.383	1:17.074	1:16.547	4
5	14	(Spain) Fernando Alonso	Ferrari	1:17.853	1:17.200	1:16.686	5
6	7	(Finland) Kimi Räikkönen	Ferrari	1:17.902	1:17.398	1:17.389	6
7	25	(France) Jean-Éric Vergne	Toro Rosso-Renault	**1:17.557**	1:17.657	1:17.540	7
8	20	(Denmark) Kevin Magnussen	McLaren-Mercedes	1:17.978	1:17.609	1:17.555	8
9	26	(Russia) Daniil Kvyat	Toro Rosso-Renault	1:18.616	1:17.594	1:18.090	9
10	11	(Mexico) Sergio Pérez	Force India-Mercedes	1:18.108	1:17.755	1:18.327	10
11	27	(Germany) Nico Hülkenberg	Force India-Mercedes	1:18.432	1:17.846	N/A	11
12	22	(United Kingdom) Jenson Button	McLaren-Mercedes	1:17.890	1:17.988	N/A	12
13	77	(Finland) Valtteri Bottas	Williams-Mercedes	1:18.407	1:18.082	N/A	13
14	8	(France) Romain Grosjean	Lotus-Renault	1:18.335	1:18.196	N/A	14
15	13	(Venezuela) Pastor Maldonado	Lotus-Renault	1:18.585	1:18.356	N/A	15
16	19	(Brazil) Felipe Massa	Williams-Mercedes	1:18.209	No Time^{2}	N/A	16
17	21	(Mexico) Esteban Gutiérrez	Sauber-Ferrari	1:18.741	N/A	N/A	17
18	99	(Germany) Adrian Sutil	Sauber-Ferrari	1:18.745	N/A	N/A	18
19	17	(France) Jules Bianchi	Marussia-Ferrari	1:19.332	N/A	N/A	21^{1}
20	4	(United Kingdom) Max Chilton	Marussia-Ferrari	1:19.928	N/A	N/A	19
21	10	(Japan) Kamui Kobayashi	Caterham-Renault	1:20.133	N/A	N/A	20
22	9	(Sweden) Marcus Ericsson	Caterham-Renault	1:21.732	N/A	N/A	PL^{2}
107% time: 1:22.985

Notes

- **^1** – Jules Bianchi was given a five-place grid penalty, for an unscheduled gearbox change.
- **^2** – Marcus Ericsson started from the pit lane after causing a collision with Felipe Massa in the first part of qualifying, preventing Massa from participating in the second session.

== Race ==
The weather at the start was dry and overcast with an air temperature between 20 and 21 °C (68 and 70 °F) and a track temperature ranging from 28 to 30 °C (82 to 86 °F). A 20 percent chance of rain was forecast. Rosberg's hand clutch was replaced when the one he used in qualifying burned out following his error at Mirabeau corner. After the problems with his car in qualifying, Red Bull changed parts of Vettel's energy recovery system. He did not incur a penalty but was not allowed to use the parts again until the Abu Dhabi Grand Prix. Maldonado was unable to take the start because of a fuel pump failure on the grid. When the race began at 14:00 Central European Summer Time (UTC+2), Rosberg led the field into the first corner with teammate Hamilton in second. Vettel remained in third while Räikkönen moved from sixth to fourth, ahead of Ricciardo and Alonso who had been boxed in by Ricciardo. After hitting Button, Pérez spun leaving Mirabeau corner, and his car's suspension was damaged, and had further contact with Sutil, ending his race. The incident blocked the track and forced drivers to slow to allow them to pass Pérez's stranded car.

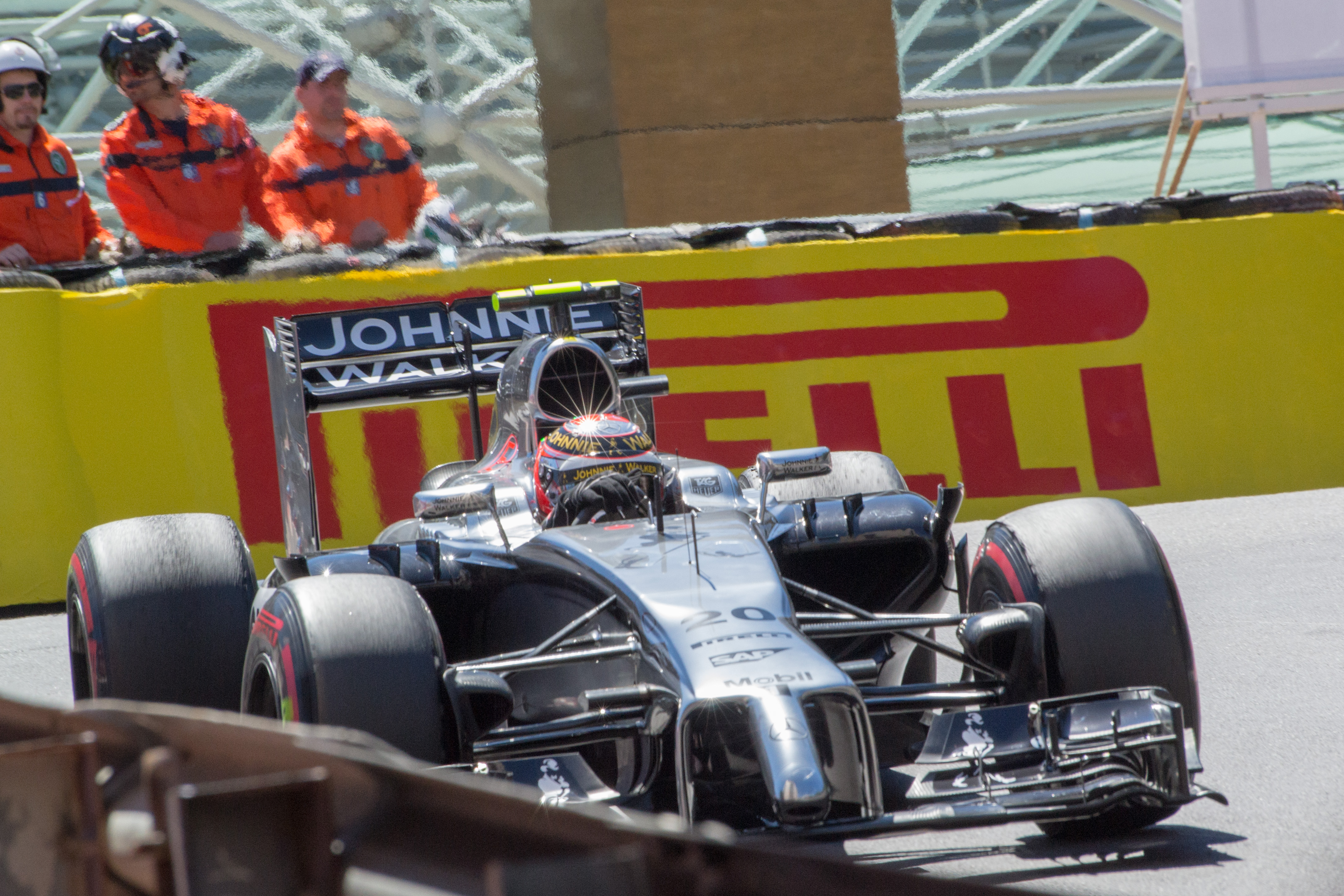
Kevin Magnussen scored one championship point in tenth place.

The safety car was deployed to allow marshals to move Pérez's car onto the run-off area. Grosjean's tyre was punctured from contact by Sutil and both drivers made pit stops. Swift work from the marshals allowed the safety car to be withdrawn at the end of the third lap and Rosberg led. A mechanical problem stopped Vettel's turbocharger and the rest of the field overtook him. He made a pit stop and emerged among the leaders and complained he was stuck in first gear. Both Mercedes drivers pulled away from the rest of the field, and Hamilton was six-tenths of a second behind Rosberg by being faster. Vettel's turbocharger restarted on lap six but Red Bull instructed him to retire on the following lap. The stewards investigated the first lap incident between Pérez and Button. An exhaust issue forced Kvyat to retire in the pit lane on lap 11.

As drivers struggled to keep heat in their tyres, the time deficit between Rosberg and Hamilton varied but held a larger lead over the rest of the field. Rosberg locked his tyres into Mirabeau corner but avoided driving onto the turn's escape road on lap 18. Soon after, the stewards imposed five-second stop-and-go penalties on Chilton, Ericsson and Gutiérrez for being out of position on the grid. Hamilton began to lap faster than teammate Rosberg before the latter responded by going two-tenths of a second quicker than Hamilton to extend his lead. Ricciardo closed to within 1.1 seconds of Räikkönen by lap 22 by going one second faster than Räikkönen. Cresting a rise leaving the tunnel on lap 24, Sutil's car became light braking from 170 mph (270 km/h), speared into the inside wall, and slid down the escape road at the Novelle chicane. A marshal ducked under the barrier to avoid debris hitting him. Sutil was unhurt but the safety car was deployed for debris removal.

Every driver, except for Massa, elected to make pit stops for new tyres. Hamilton radioed his team on whether he should make a pit stop to which they responded no. He was annoyed, asking why he could not make a pit stop the lap before and fell back from Rosberg to avoid waiting behind his teammate. Vergne was released directly in front of Magnussen, causing him to swerve to prevent contact, prompting the stewards to investigate Vergne. On lap 28, Räikkönen had to make a second pit stop for a punctured tyre after Chilton's front wing hit his left-rear wheel at Mirabeau corner. Ricciardo and Alonso took over third and fourth. The safety car entered the pit lane at the end of lap 30 and racing resumed with Rosberg leading Hamilton. As the race restarted, Magnussen passed Vergne into Rasacasse corner but returned it because he had done it before the second safety car line. Hülkenberg aggressively overtook Magnussen on the inside at Portier corner for seventh.

Räikkönen passed Kobayashi at the Novelle chicane for 12th place on lap 33 but ran wide and gave the position back to Kobayashi. Vergne was imposed a drive-through penalty for his unsafe pit stop release on the following lap and served it four laps later. After Räikkönen passed Kobayashi, Bianchi and Kobayashi made contact three times and Bianchi overtook on the outside at Rasacasse corner for 13th on lap 36. At the front, Rosberg continued to lead Hamilton and the duo pulled away from the rest of the field. Mercedes instructed Rosberg by radio to use longer gears at Sainte Dévote and Casino Square corners as a fuel-saving measure, causing him to defend from Hamilton over the following laps after slowing. Hamilton closed up to Rosberg but was unable to pass his teammate who was faster into the tunnel. Massa made his only pit stop of the race on lap 45 and emerged in 11th place behind Räikkönen but ahead of Bianchi.

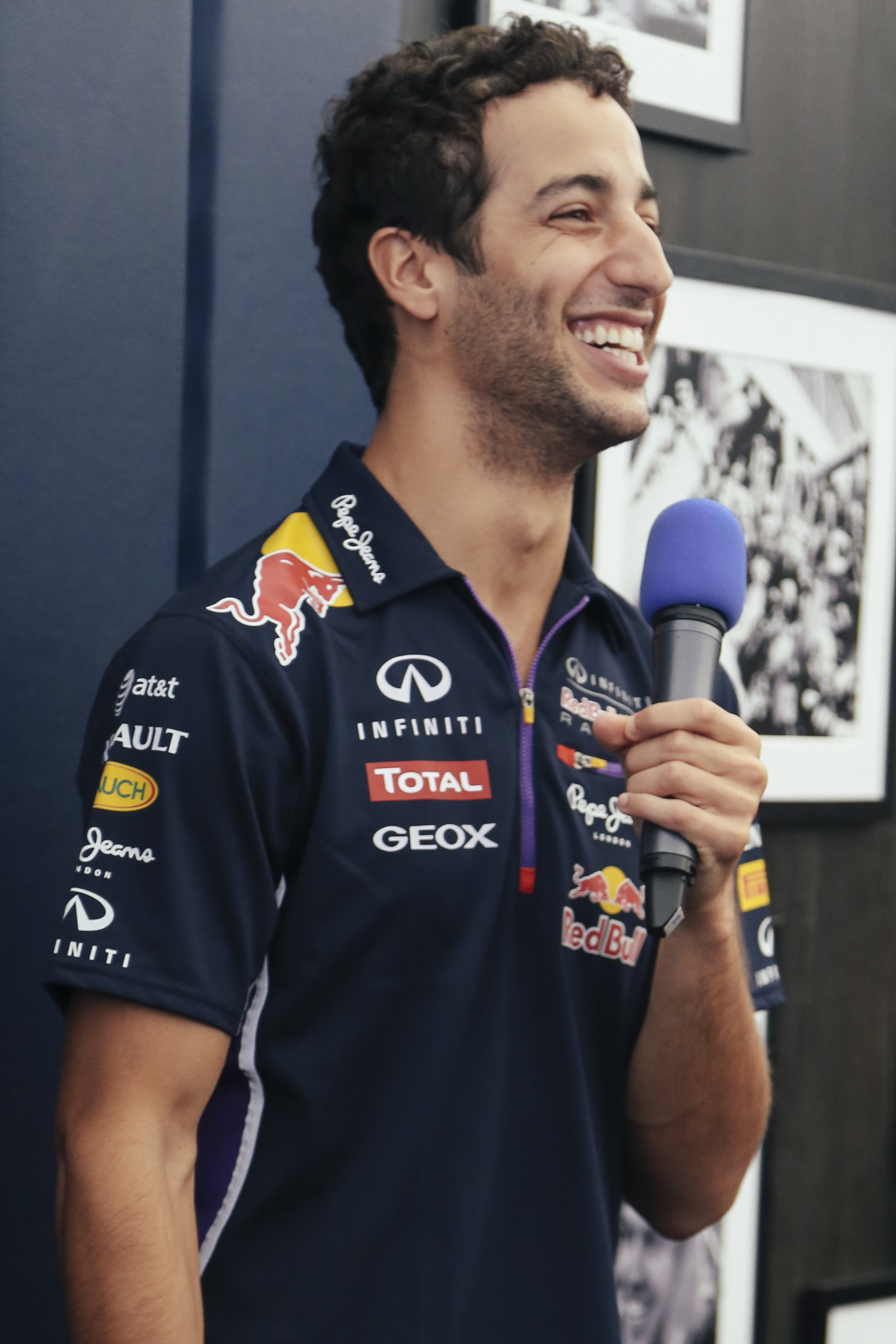
Daniel Ricciardo finished in third position.

While Rosberg was instructed to continue conserving fuel, Hamilton was told by radio that he did not need to do so. Rosberg was reassured that his fuel consumption levels were back on target and began to lap faster than Hamilton. Vergne caught Bianchi and the two made minor contact at the Loews hairpin. Leaving the tunnel, smoke billowed from the rear of Vergne's car but he was able to enter the pit lane and retire on lap 52. Gutiérrez caught Bottas along with, Räikkönen and Massa – who was on new tyres – and Gutiérrez attacked Bottas at the Novelle chicane but Bottas kept eighth by cutting the corner. With smoke billowing from his car on lap 55, Bottas drove to the side of the track at the Loews hairpin to retire. The need for a safety car was avoided when a crane removed his car from the track and yellow flags were waved in the area. Gutiérrez in eighth was on course to score points when he hit the inside guardrail at La Rascasse on lap 59, damaging his car's rear suspension and necessitating his retirement. This promoted Bianchi into tenth, which put him in position to score Marussia's first championship points in Formula One, but he also had a five-second time penalty for illegally taking his earlier, five-second time penalty under the safety car.

After running closely behind teammate Rosberg and feeling the wind penetrating his visor, Hamilton got some dirt in his left eye on lap 66 and slowed in the circuit's low-speed turns as a result, allowing Ricciardo to close up to him. Hülkenberg had heavily worn rear super soft tyres, and by the 69th lap, was caught by McLaren drivers Button and Magnussen. Bianchi was told that he needed to be five seconds ahead of Grosjean to cancel out the time penalty. Five laps later, Button overtook teammate Magnussen on the main straight for sixth. Räikkönen ran too deep in doing the same on the inside at the Loews hairpin on lap 74, putting himself and Magnussen in the barrier. Both Räikkönen and Magnussen reversed out of the barrier but lost a large amount of time, promoting Bianchi to eighth and Grosjean to ninth. Räikkönen had to make a third pit stop for a new front wing and the super soft tyres.

Rosberg opened the gap to 8.8 seconds, and won the 78-lap race. Hamilton finished second, 9.2 seconds behind and held off the hard-charging Ricciardo at the start/finish line. Alonso took fourth, Hülkenberg fifth and Button sixth. He was followed by Massa in seventh, Grosjean eighth, Bianchi was ninth after his five-second time penalty was applied and Magnussen tenth. Ericsson missed out on scoring Caterham's first points in 11th, and Räikkönen, Kobayashi and Chilton were the final classified finishers. Rosberg's victory was his second of the season and the fifth of his career. The Mercedes team continued their dominance of the season with their fifth consecutive one-two finish. Rosberg led every lap from pole position but was denied his first career Grand Slam when Räikkönen set the race's fastest lap of 1:18.479 on lap 75. There were 14 out of the 22 qualifiers that finished the race.

=== Post-race ===
At the podium interviews, conducted by actor Benedict Cumberbatch, Rosberg described the day as "very, very special" and praised his car and team. Hamilton said that despite the eye problem it was "a good day" and "really good" Mercedes finished first and second. Ricciardo stated it was "really nice" to stand on the podium in Monaco and third was the best result his team could achieve. In the subsequent press conference, Rosberg said the victory was more "special" because Hamilton had pre-race momentum and was unsurprised he was not called into the pit lane following Sutil's crash. Hamilton said he remained in a particular engine mode and was certain the battle with his teammate Rosberg would continue until later in the season. When asked if Red Bull would have the pace to challenge Mercedes, Ricciardo replied he felt the team closed slightly in Monaco and the circuit favoured the car slightly better than at other tracks.

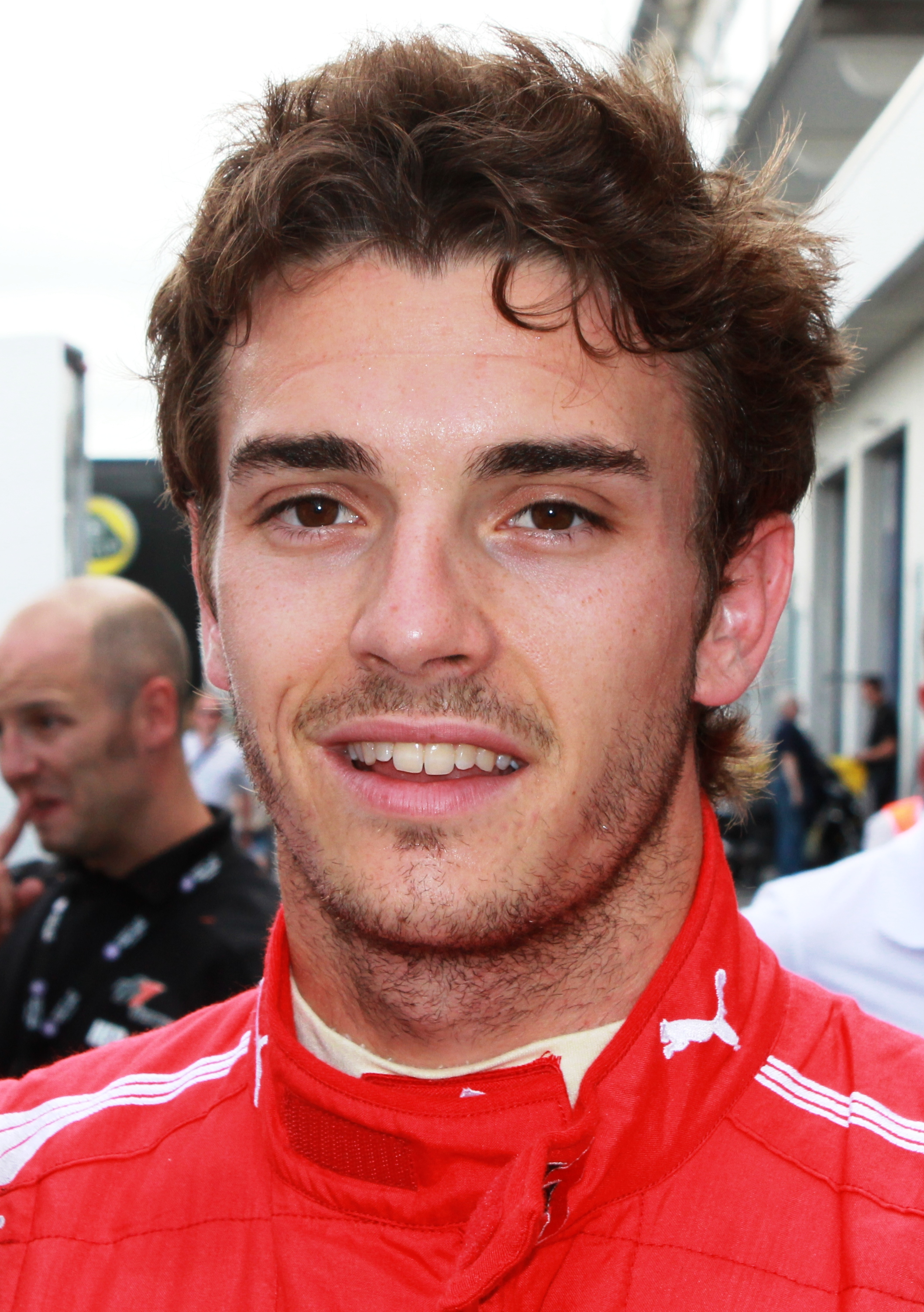
Jules Bianchi (pictured in 2012) scored his and Marussia's first points in Formula One.

Bianchi's ninth-place finish earned him and Marussia's first career points since the team entered Formula One as Virgin Racing in 2010. He told Sky Sports F1 that Marussia had been awaiting a long time for the result and was "so proud" for his team, saying: "They did a really good job and I am really happy to give them the result." Marussia team principal John Booth was delighted at Bianchi's overtake on Kobayashi, describing it as "stunning", and despite the five-second time penalty, his team were "absolutely over the moon" with the achievement. Graeme Lowdon, Marussia chief executive officer, was pleased at the sign of progress, saying: "It is tough and I would be lying if I didn't reflect that", and the result was a "direct reward for people who have worked very hard." Alonso said of Bianchi: "I am extremely happy for him, [and] very proud for what this result will mean for his career. I have no doubts it will be a good career, but hopefully with this result he can have a more competitive car next year and show his talents even more." Former driver Allan McNish wrote in his BBC F1 column the result was like "a Grand Prix victory" for Marussia and called it "a deserved reward for their dogged determination and never-say-die attitude." Following Bianchi's death from severe head injuries at the 2014 Japanese Grand Prix, Will Dale of Fox Sports Australia wrote: "Monaco 2014 will be remembered as his day in the sun, the high watermark of a career — a life — ended far too soon."

Tensions at Mercedes increased following qualifying in which Hamilton felt Rosberg had deliberately driven off the track in a bid to stop him taking pole position, which strained their relationship. Hamilton refused to accept Rosberg's apology for the incident and the two did not communicate with each other on the podium. Mercedes' non-executive chairman Niki Lauda, upset over the incident, said he disliked the lack of communication between the two drivers on the podium and that he would talk to them before Canada. Toto Wolff, the Mercedes team principal, said the incident between Rosberg and Hamilton would not be allowed to reoccur in the future and that the drivers would be given autonomy as long as they did nothing deceitfully. Hamilton said he had no answer and was surprised on how quickly the situation escalated. After Hamilton spoke with Rosberg, he posted a picture on Twitter with him and Rosberg in their youth to ease anxiety over their relationship, saying: "We've been friends a long time, and as friends we have our ups and downs. Today we spoke and we're cool, still friends, no problem." FIA race director Charlie Whiting suggested that qualifying be extended by one minute to give drivers affected by yellow flags another attempt at a timed lap to prevent similar incidents from happening again.

The stewards reprimanded Räikkönen for his late race contact with Magnussen but took no action on the first lap incident between Button and Pérez. Magnussen argued that Räikkönen was to blame for the incident, saying that he drove defensively, while Räikkönen admitted following his contact with Chilton earlier in the race, he was willing to attempt aggressive manoeuvres. Pérez blamed Button for his retirement, saying that he did not expect Button to be there because of a lack of space for another car. Button did not comment on the crash. Red Bull team principal Christian Horner opined that Vettel would not allow his frustrations to get the better of him after his turbocharger problem, and said Ricciardo's challenge on Hamilton in the final laps was an indication that the team's approach was correct but noted a realistic overtake was not possible unless there was an error.

The result saw Rosberg retake the Drivers' Championship lead with 122 championship points, four ahead of Hamilton. Alonso maintained third position on 61 championship points, while Ricciardo's third-place finish moved him seven championship points clear of Hülkenberg in fifth. Mercedes's one-two finish further increased their advantage at the top of the Constructors' Championship to 141 championship points ahead of second-placed Red Bull. Ferrari remained in third place with 78 championship points. Force India likewise kept fourth and McLaren passed Williams for fifth with 13 races left in the season.

=== Race classification ===
Drivers who scored championship points are denoted in bold.

Pos.	No.	Driver	Constructor	Laps	Time/Retired	Grid	Points
1	6	(Germany) **Nico Rosberg**	**Mercedes**	78	1:49:27.661	1	25
2	44	(United Kingdom) **Lewis Hamilton**	**Mercedes**	78	+9.210	2	18
3	3	(Australia) **Daniel Ricciardo**	**Red Bull Racing-Renault**	78	+9.614	3	15
4	14	(Spain) **Fernando Alonso**	**Ferrari**	78	+32.452	5	12
5	27	(Germany) **Nico Hülkenberg**	**Force India-Mercedes**	77	+1 Lap	11	10
6	22	(United Kingdom) **Jenson Button**	**McLaren-Mercedes**	77	+1 Lap	12	8
7	19	(Brazil) **Felipe Massa**	**Williams-Mercedes**	77	+1 Lap	16	6
8	8	(France) **Romain Grosjean**	**Lotus-Renault**	77	+1 Lap	14	4
9^{3}	17	(France) **Jules Bianchi**	**Marussia-Ferrari**	77	+1 Lap	21	2
10	20	(Denmark) **Kevin Magnussen**	**McLaren-Mercedes**	77	+1 Lap	8	1
11	9	(Sweden) Marcus Ericsson	Caterham-Renault	77	+1 Lap	PL	
12	7	(Finland) Kimi Räikkönen	Ferrari	77	+1 Lap	6	
13	10	(Japan) Kamui Kobayashi	Caterham-Renault	75	+3 Laps	20	
14	4	(United Kingdom) Max Chilton	Marussia-Ferrari	75	+3 Laps	19	
Ret	21	(Mexico) Esteban Gutiérrez	Sauber-Ferrari	59	Accident	17	
Ret	77	(Finland) Valtteri Bottas	Williams-Mercedes	55	Engine	13	
Ret	25	(France) Jean-Éric Vergne	Toro Rosso-Renault	50	Exhaust	7	
Ret	99	(Germany) Adrian Sutil	Sauber-Ferrari	23	Accident	18	
Ret	26	(Russia) Daniil Kvyat	Toro Rosso-Renault	10	Exhaust	9	
Ret	1	(Germany) Sebastian Vettel	Red Bull Racing-Renault	5	Turbocharger	4	
Ret	11	(Mexico) Sergio Pérez	Force India-Mercedes	0	Collision	10	
DNS	13	(Venezuela) Pastor Maldonado	Lotus-Renault	0	Fuel pump	15	

Notes

^3 – Jules Bianchi had five seconds added to his race time for taking a penalty under the safety car, and he dropped from eighth to ninth.

== Championship standings after the race ==
Drivers' Championship standings

+/–	Pos.	Driver	Points
1	1	(Germany) Nico Rosberg	122
1	2	(United Kingdom) Lewis Hamilton	118
	3	(Spain) Fernando Alonso	61
1	4	(Australia) Daniel Ricciardo	54
1	5	(Germany) Nico Hülkenberg	47

Constructors' Championship standings

+/–	Pos.	Driver	Points
	1	(Germany) Mercedes	240
	2	(Austria) Red Bull Racing-Renault	99
	3	(Italy) Ferrari	78
	4	Force India-Mercedes	67
1	5	(United Kingdom) McLaren-Mercedes	52
Sources:

- Note: Only the top five positions are included for both sets of standings.

== See also ==
- 2014 Monaco GP2 Series round

== Notes and references ==
=== References ===
Previous race: 2014 Spanish Grand Prix	FIA Formula One World Championship; 2014 season	Next race: 2014 Canadian Grand Prix
Previous race: 2013 Monaco Grand Prix	Monaco Grand Prix	Next race: 2015 Monaco Grand Prix
